= Fokker E.IV =

Fighter aircraft

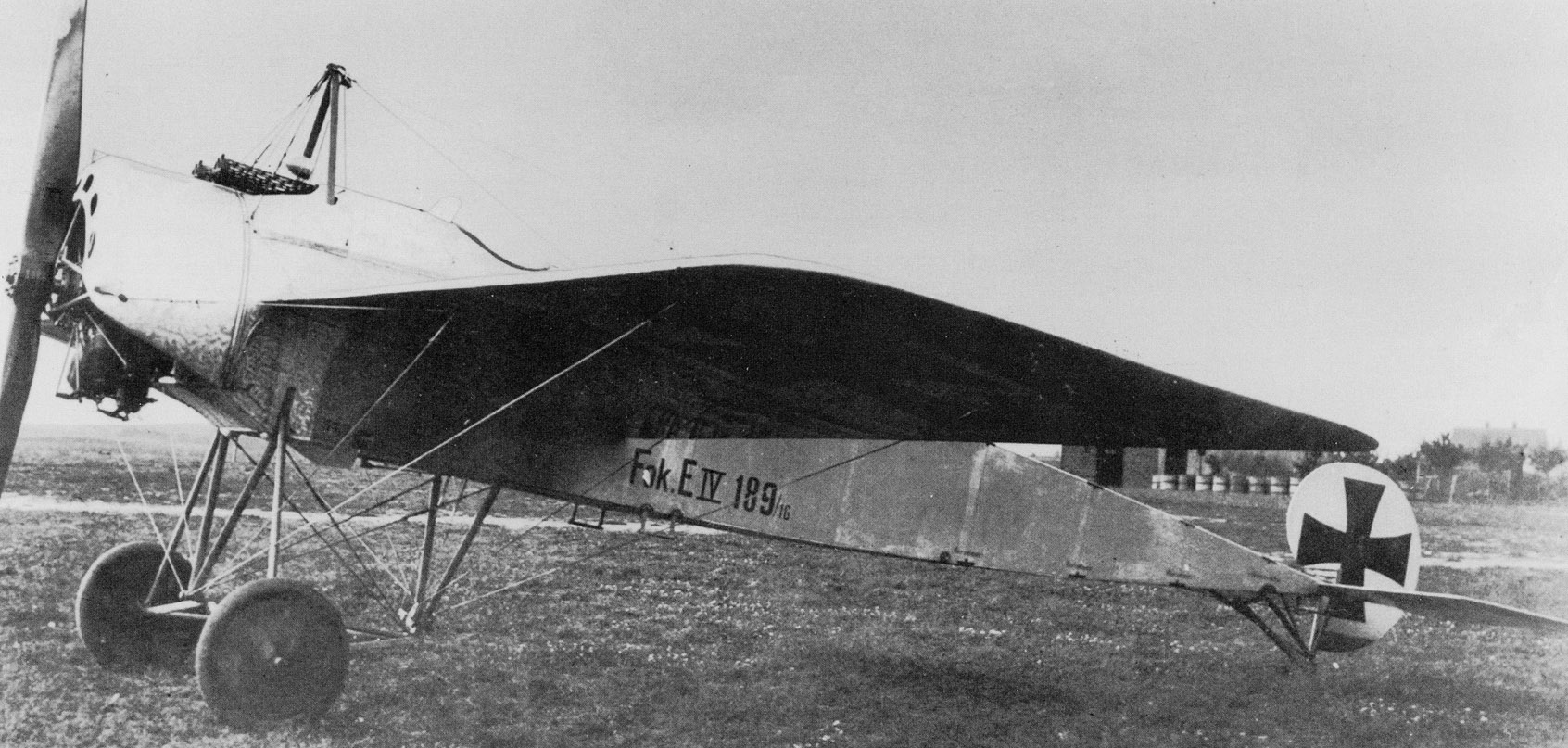

General information
- Type: Fighter
- Manufacturer: Fokker-Flugzeugwerke
- Designer: Anthony Fokker
- Primary user: Luftstreitkräfte
- Number built: 49

History
- Manufactured: 1915-1916
- Introduction date: October 1915
- First flight: September 1915
- Variants: E.I - E.II - E.III

The Fokker E.IV was the final variant of the Eindecker fighter aircraft that was operated by Germany during World War I.

== Design and development ==
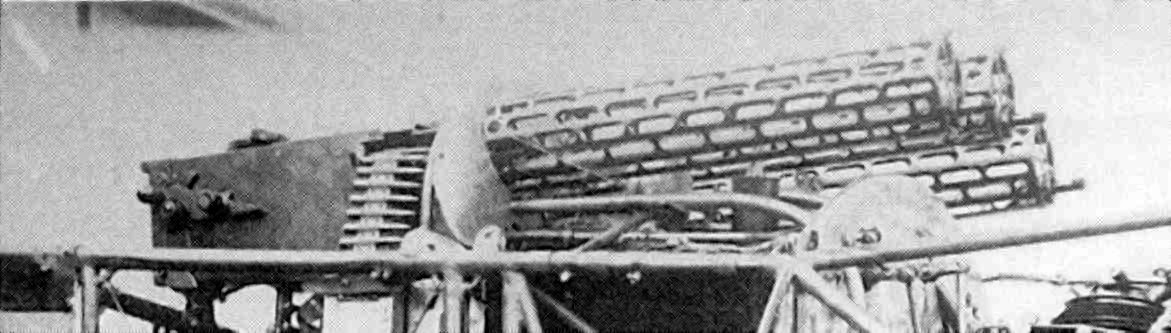
Trio of lMG 08 Machine guns reportedly on Kurt Wintgens' E.IV

Given the Fokker designation of M.15, the E.IV was essentially a lengthened E.III powered by the 119 kW (160 hp) Oberursel U.III two-row, 14-cylinder rotary engine, a copy of the Gnome Double Lambda. The more powerful engine was intended to enable the Eindecker to carry two or three 7.92 mm (.312 in) machine guns, thereby increasing its firepower and providing redundancy if one gun jammed - a common occurrence at the time. However, the E.IV was a troubled design that never achieved the success of its predecessor and was soon outclassed by French and British fighters.

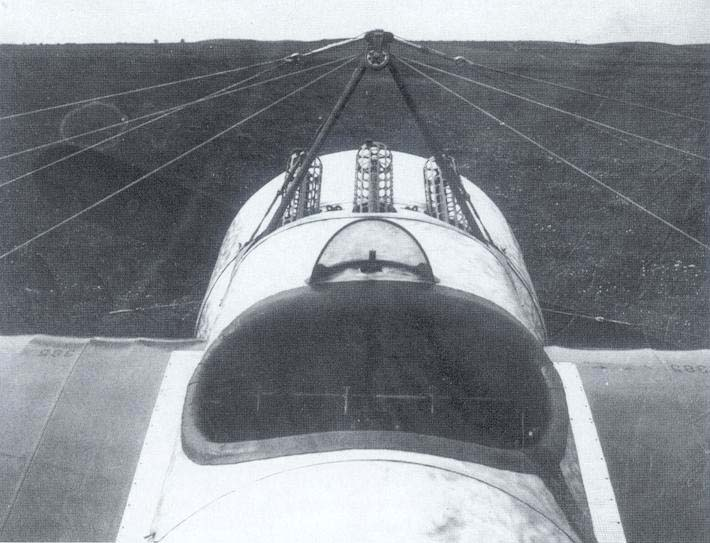
The Fokker E.IV's original "three-Spandau" armament, before the portside gun was removed.

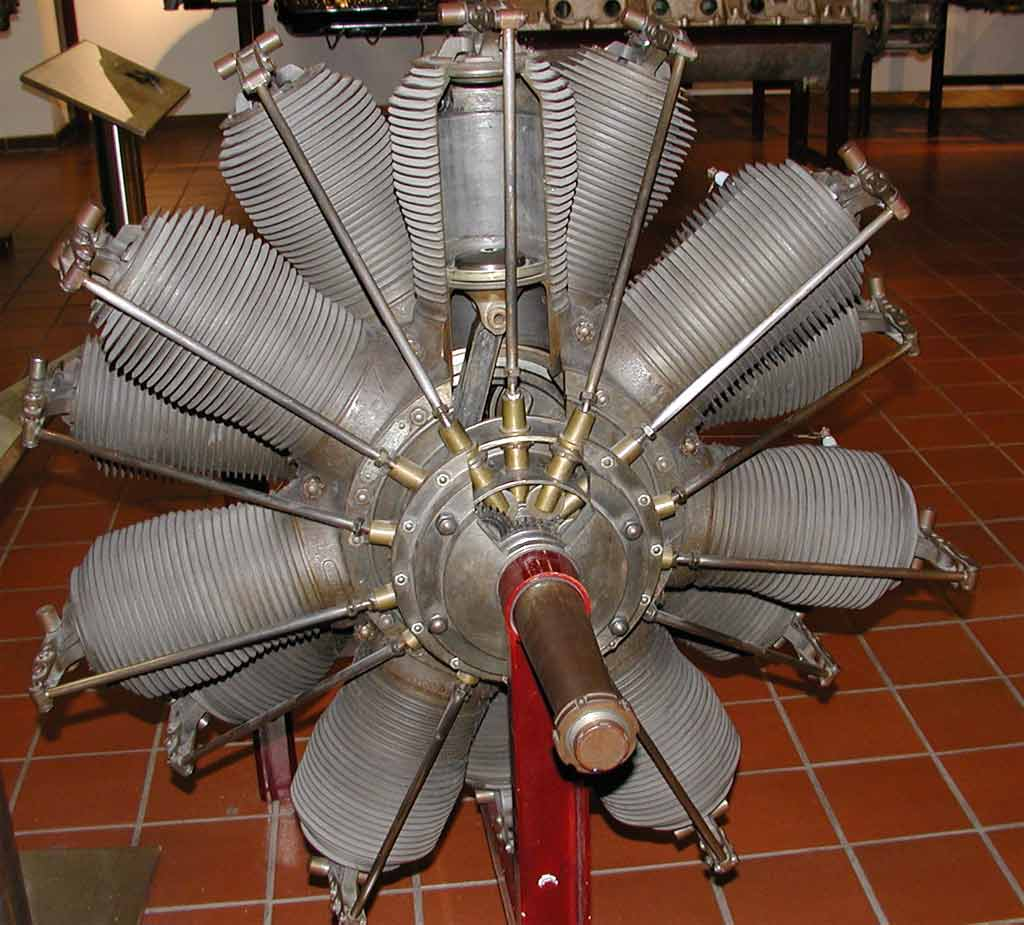
German Oberursel U.III engine in museum

The prototype E.IV was accepted for testing by the German Inspektion der Fliegertruppen in September 1915. It was fitted with three forward-firing 7.92 mm (.312 in) lMG 08 "Spandau" machine guns, mounted to fire upwards at 15°. Anthony Fokker demonstrated the E.IV at Essen but the complicated triple-synchronization gear failed and the propeller was damaged. The removal of the left-side gun is believed to have been pioneered on Oswald Boelcke's E.IV, believed to have borne IdFlieg serial 123/15, with a simpler double-synchronisation system used on the retained center-line and right side MG 08 Spandau guns. The fitment of dual MG 08 "Spandau" forward-firing synchronized machine guns became the standard armament for production E.IVs, and indeed for all subsequent German D-type biplane fighters. The angling of the guns was also abandoned.

== Operational history ==
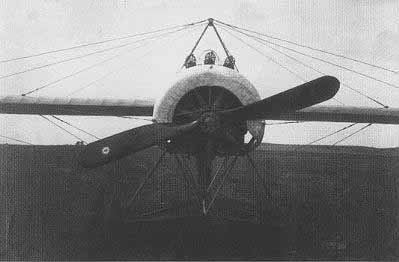
Fokker E.IV's three gun installation, seen "nose-on".

The modified prototype underwent combat evaluation on the Western Front by Oberleutnant Otto Parschau in October 1915, making it the first twin-gun fighter in service. Leading German ace Oswald Boelcke evaluated the E.IV at Fokker's Schwerin factory in November. The pilots discovered that mounting the much heavier Oberursel U.III onto the Eindecker airframe did not produce a better aircraft - one pilot described it as "practically a flying engine." The inertial and gyroscopic forces of the spinning mass made the E.IV less manoeuvrable than the E.III and any loss of efficiency from the notoriously unreliable engine made the aircraft virtually uncontrollable, requiring the engine to be switched off. Turning under such conditions was exceedingly difficult because the E.IV still used wing warping instead of ailerons. Furthermore, the engine worked well when new, but lost power after only a few hours of operation.

Only 49 E.IVs were built out of the total Eindecker production run of 416 aircraft. Over half of the E.IVs entered service in June 1916 and the last were delivered in December 1916 by which time they were obsolete.

== Operators ==
German Empire

- Luftstreitkräfte operated 48 aircraft.
- Kaiserliche Marine received one aircraft.

== Specifications (E.IV) ==
General characteristics

- Crew: 1
- Length: 7.5 m (24 ft 7 in)
- Wingspan: 10 m (32 ft 10 in)
- Height: 2.7 m (8 ft 10 in)
- Wing area: 15.9 m^{2} (171 sq ft)
- Empty weight: 466 kg (1,027 lb)
- Max takeoff weight: 724 kg (1,596 lb)
- Powerplant: 1 × Oberursel U.III 14-cyl. two-row air-cooled rotary piston engine, 119 kW (160 hp)

Performance

- Maximum speed: 170 km/h (110 mph, 92 kn)
- Range: 240 km (150 mi, 130 nmi)
- Service ceiling: 3,960 m (12,990 ft)
- Rate of climb: 4.167 m/s (820.3 ft/min)

Armament

- Guns: 2 × forward-firing 7.92 mm (.312 in) LMG 08 "Spandau" machine guns

or 3 x forward-firing 7.92 mm (.312 in) LMG 08 "Spandau" machine guns

== See also ==
Related development Fokker E.III Related lists List of military aircraft of Germany -

== Bibliography ==
- Gray, Peter & Thetford, Owen (1987) [1970]. German Aircraft of the First World War (2nd ed.). London: Putnam. ISBN 0-85177-809-7.
- Green, William & Swanborough, Gordon (2001) [1994]. The Complete Book of Fighters: An Illustrated Encyclopedia of Every Fighter Built and Flown (Revised and Updated ed.). London: Salamander Books. ISBN 1-84065-269-1.
