= Heinrich Lübbe =

German engineer

Heinrich Lübbe (German pronunciation: [ˈhaɪnʁɪç ˈlʏbə]; 12 January 1884 in Nienburg, Province of Hanover – 14 March 1940 in Berlin) was a German engineer working for Dutch aircraft designer Anthony Fokker during the First World War. He devised the pioneering Stangensteuerung gun synchronizer which enabled a machine gun to fire through the arc of a fighter aircraft's propeller without the bullets striking the propeller's blades. It was first fitted to Leutnant Otto Parschau's Fokker A.III bearing IdFlieg military serial number A.16/15 in the late spring of 1915, to create the prototype of the entire line of Fokker Eindecker single-seat fighters to come.

In late 1925 Lübbe invested 135,000 Reichmarks in the Rostock branch of the wartime Flugzeugbau Friedrichshafen company which had been renamed Arado Flugzeugwerke earlier that year. Historian Volker Koos believes that Lübbe or some of the other investors probably served as straw men for the Reich Ministry of Transport which kept the company alive with small orders until 1933. His refusal to join the Nazi Party in 1936 led to his removal when Arado was nationalized.

== Bibliography ==
- Koos, Volker (2021). Arado Flugzeugwerke: Aircraft and Development History. n.p.: Fonthill. ISBN 978-1-78155-671-9.
