= Fokker A.I =

A.I
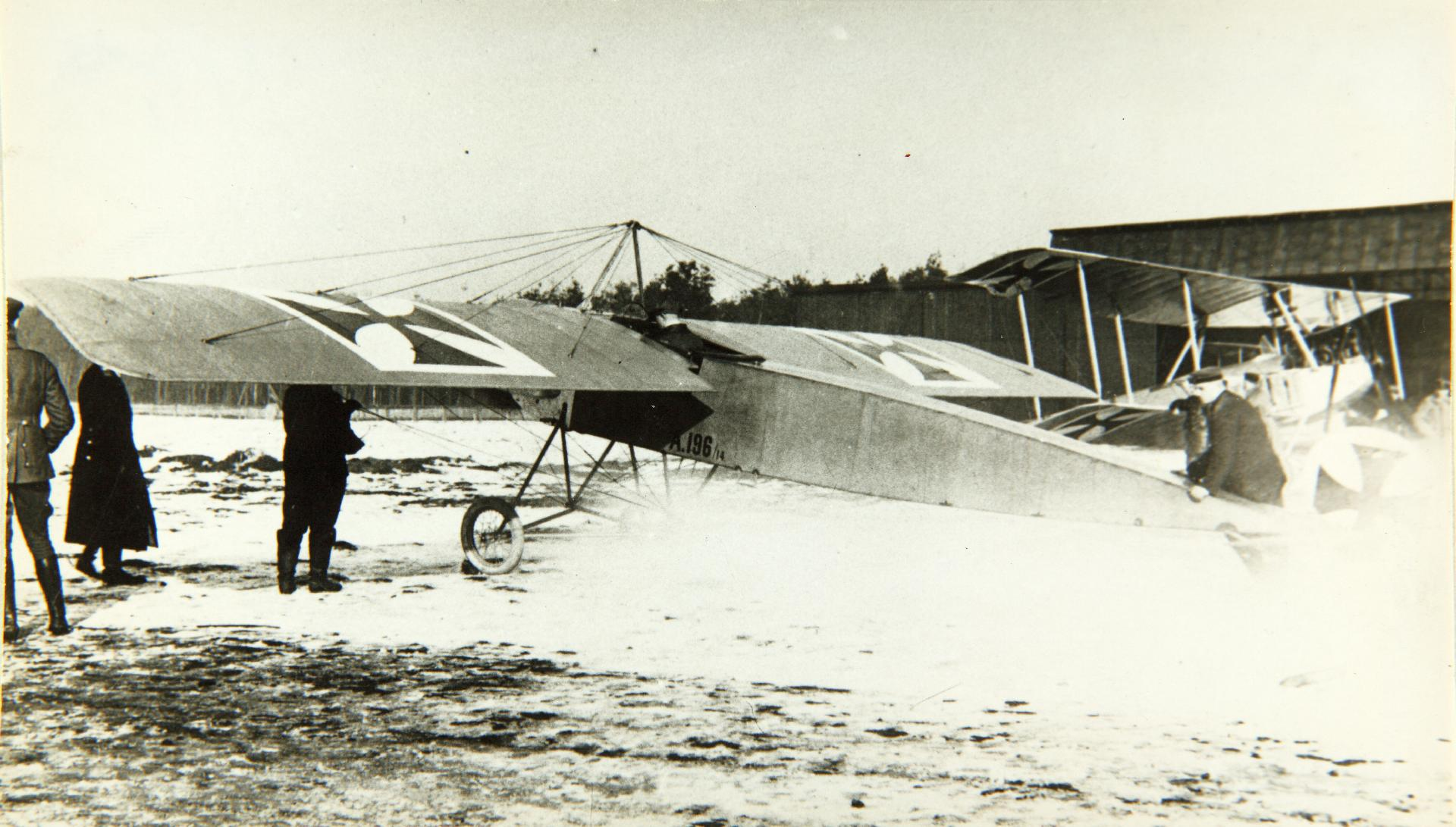

General information
- Type: Reconnaissance aircraft
- Manufacturer: Fokker
- Designer: Martin Kreutzer
- Status: retired
- Primary users: Fliegertruppe Kaiserliche Marine's; Marine-Fliegerabteilung; Austro-Hungarian; K.u.K. Luftfahrtruppen
- Number built: from 63–85

History
- Manufactured: 1914–15
- Retired: early 1915

The Fokker A.I (Fokker designation M.8) was an "A-class" unarmed two-seat monoplane observation aircraft of the 1914-15 era early in World War I, powered as the earlier Fokker M.5 was, by a 58.8 kW (80 PS) Oberursel U.0 seven cylinder rotary engine, or umlaufmotor, a near-clone of the Gnome Lambda rotary engine of the same power output level — the same U.0 seven cylinder rotary engine version was used on all Fokker military monoplanes before the Fokker E.II Eindecker fighter's debut in 1915-16. The A.I aircraft resembled a substantially enlarged Fokker M.5, with a tall dorsal cabane structure to handle the triple sets of stationary flying and landing wires anchored to the wing panels' forward spar, each panel having fourteen wing ribs, and the similarly triple sets of wing warping cables attached to the rear spar. The A.I and earlier A.IIs were both built by Fokker and license-built by Halberstadt. The origins of the A.I, A.II and A.III were in a Morane-Saulnier Type H purchased from France. This led to the initial Fokker M.5 airframe designed by Martin Kreutzer, from which the larger A.I was derived. Fokker gave many aerobatic demonstrations in the M.5 on the eve of World War I. The M.8, was ordered as the A.I by the Fliegertruppe (Imperial German Army Air Service) and between Fokker and Halberstadt, about 63 were produced.

== Specifications ==
Data from Scott, Josef (2012). Fokker Eindecker Compendium, Volume 1. Berkhampstead, Hertfordshire UK: Albatros Publications, Ltd. p. 18. ISBN 978-1-906798-22-2.
General characteristics

- Crew: 2, pilot and observer
- Length: 7.54 m (24 ft 9 in)
- Wingspan: 12.12 m (39 ft 9 in)
- Height: 2.75 m (9 ft 0 in)
- Wing area: 16.0 m^{2} (172 sq ft)
- Powerplant: 1 × Oberursel U.0 , 58.8 kW (80 hp)

Performance

- Maximum speed: 135 km/h (84 mph, 73 kn)
- Range: 400 km (249 mi, 216 nmi)
- Service ceiling: 3,000 m (9,840 ft)

Armament

- nil (intended to be unarmed)

== Bibliography ==
- Herris, Jack (2020). Fokker Aircraft of WWI: Volume 1: Spinne–M.10 & Watercraft: A Centennial Perspective on Great War Airplanes. Great War Aviation Centennial Series. Vol. 51. n.p.: Aeronaut Books. ISBN 978-1-953201-05-8.
- Klaauw, Bart van der (March–April 1999). "Unexpected Windfalls: Accidentally or Deliberately, More than 100 Aircraft 'arrived' in Dutch Territory During the Great War". Air Enthusiast (80): 54–59. ISSN 0143-5450.
- Leaman, Paul (2001). Fokker Aircraft of World War One. Marlborough, UK: Crowood Press. ISBN 1-86126-353-8.
- Scott, Josef (2012). Fokker Eindecker Compendium, Volume 1. Berkhampstead, Hertfordshire UK: Albatros Publications, Ltd. p. 32. ISBN 978-1-906798-22-2.
- Taylor, Michael J. H. (1989). Jane's Encyclopedia of Aviation. London: Studio Editions. p. 398.
