= Fokker E.III =

Fighter aircraft used in World War I

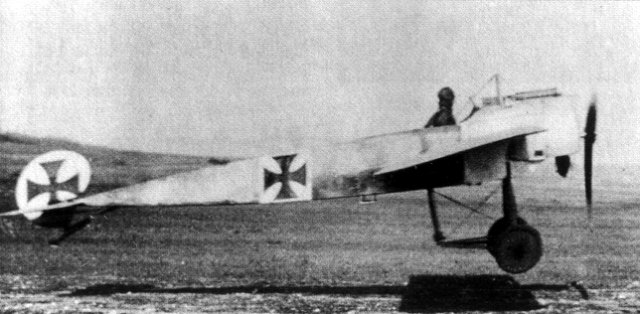
- Fokker E.III taking off

General information
- Type: Fighter
- Manufacturer: Fokker-Flugzeugwerke
- Designer: Anthony Fokker
- Primary user: Luftstreitkräfte
- Number built: 249

History
- Manufactured: 1915-1916
- Introduction date: December 1915
- First flight: 1915
- Variant: Fokker E.I - Fokker E.II

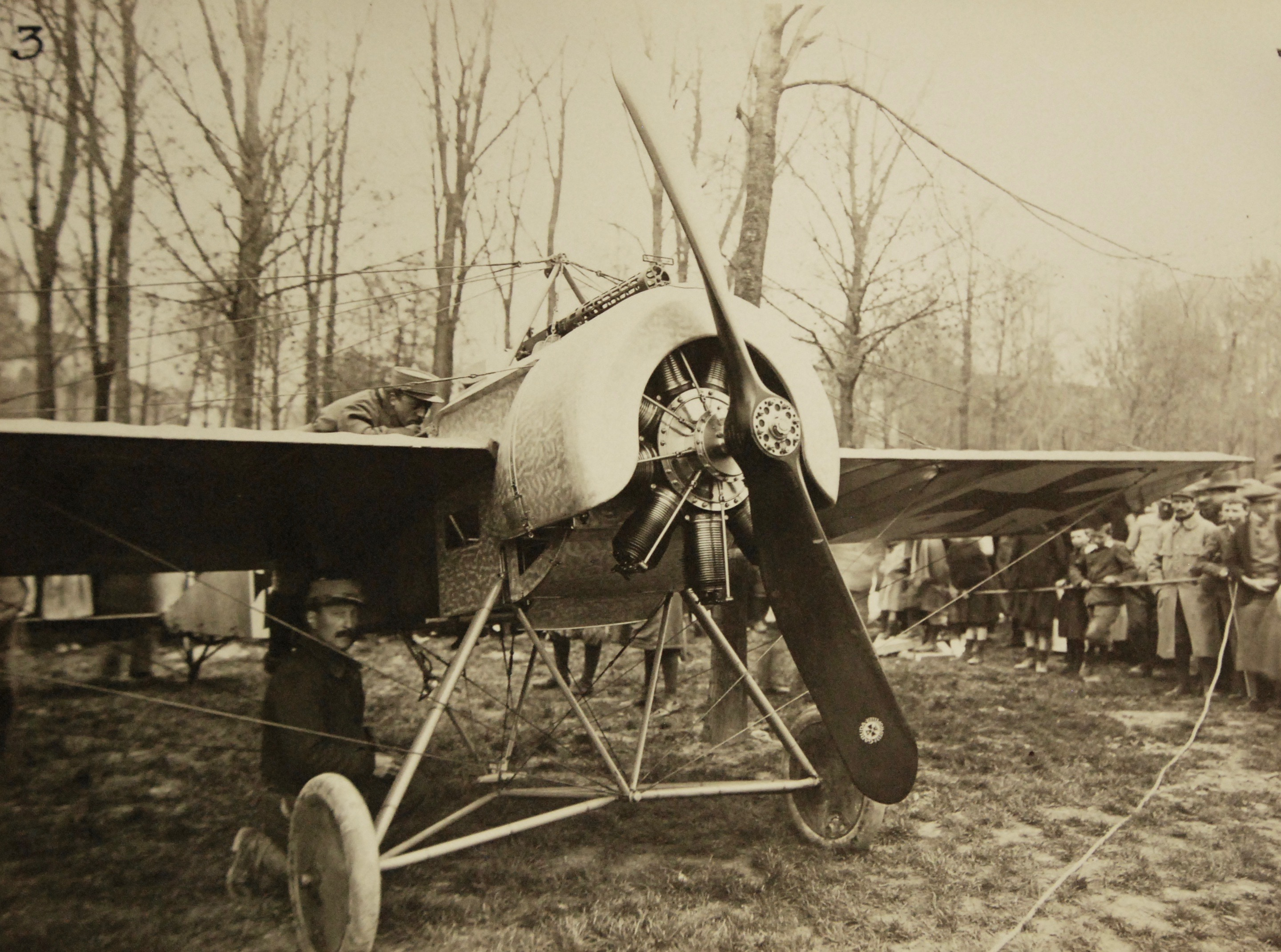
Fokker E.III (M.14V) downed in France during WWI

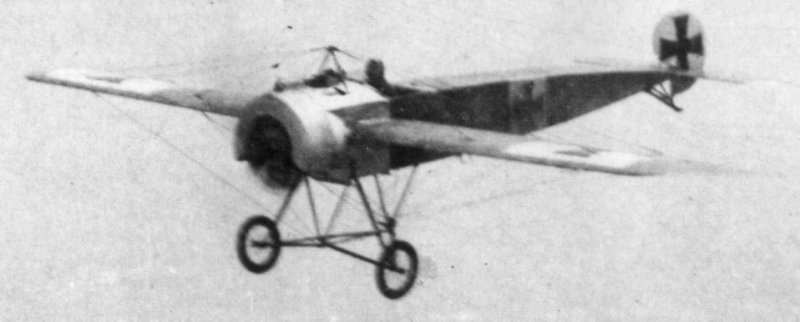
Captured E.III 210/16 in flight at Upavon, Wiltshire, in 1916.

The Fokker E.III is the main variant of the Eindecker (literally meaning "one wing") fighter aircraft of World War I. It entered service on the Western Front in December 1915 and was also supplied to Austria-Hungary and Turkey.

== Design and development ==
The E.III was basically an E.II fitted with larger, newly designed wings that had a slightly narrower chord of 1.80 meters (70 7/8 in), compared to 1.88 meters (74 in) on the earlier Eindeckers, going back to Fokker's original M.5 monoplane aircraft. The E.III retained the same 75 kW (100 hp) Oberursel U.I engine, and therefore also used the larger-diameter "horseshoe" pattern cowling that also mandated the inclusion of the E.II's soffit-like extensions to the sides of the upper nose sheet metalwork, but had a larger 81 L (21.5 gal) drum-shaped main fuel tank just behind the cockpit, which increased the Eindecker's endurance to about 2 1/2 hours, an hour more than the E.II. Most E.IIIs were armed with a single 7.92 mm (.312 in) Spandau LMG 08 machine gun with 500 rounds of ammunition; however, after the failure of the twin-gun Fokker E.IV as a viable successor, some E.IIIs were fitted with twin guns.

Fokker production figures state that 249 E.IIIs were manufactured; however, a number of the 49 E.IIs were upgraded to E.III standard when they were returned to Fokker's Schwerin factory for repairs.

== Operational history ==
The E.III was the first type to arrive in sufficient numbers to form small specialist fighter units, Kampfeinsitzer Kommandos (KEK) in early 1916. Previously, Eindeckers had been allocated singly, just as the E.I and E.II had been, to the front-line Feldflieger Abteilungen that carried out reconnaissance duties. On 10 August 1916, the first German Jagdstaffeln (single-seat fighter squadrons) were formed, initially equipped with various early fighter types, including a few E.IIIs, which were by then outmoded and being replaced by more modern fighters. Standardisation in the Jagdstaffeln (and any real success) had to wait for the availability in numbers of the Albatros D.I and Albatros D.II in early 1917.

Turkish E.IIIs were based at Beersheba in Palestine while others operated in Mesopotamia during the Siege of Kut-al-Amara.

== Surviving aircraft ==
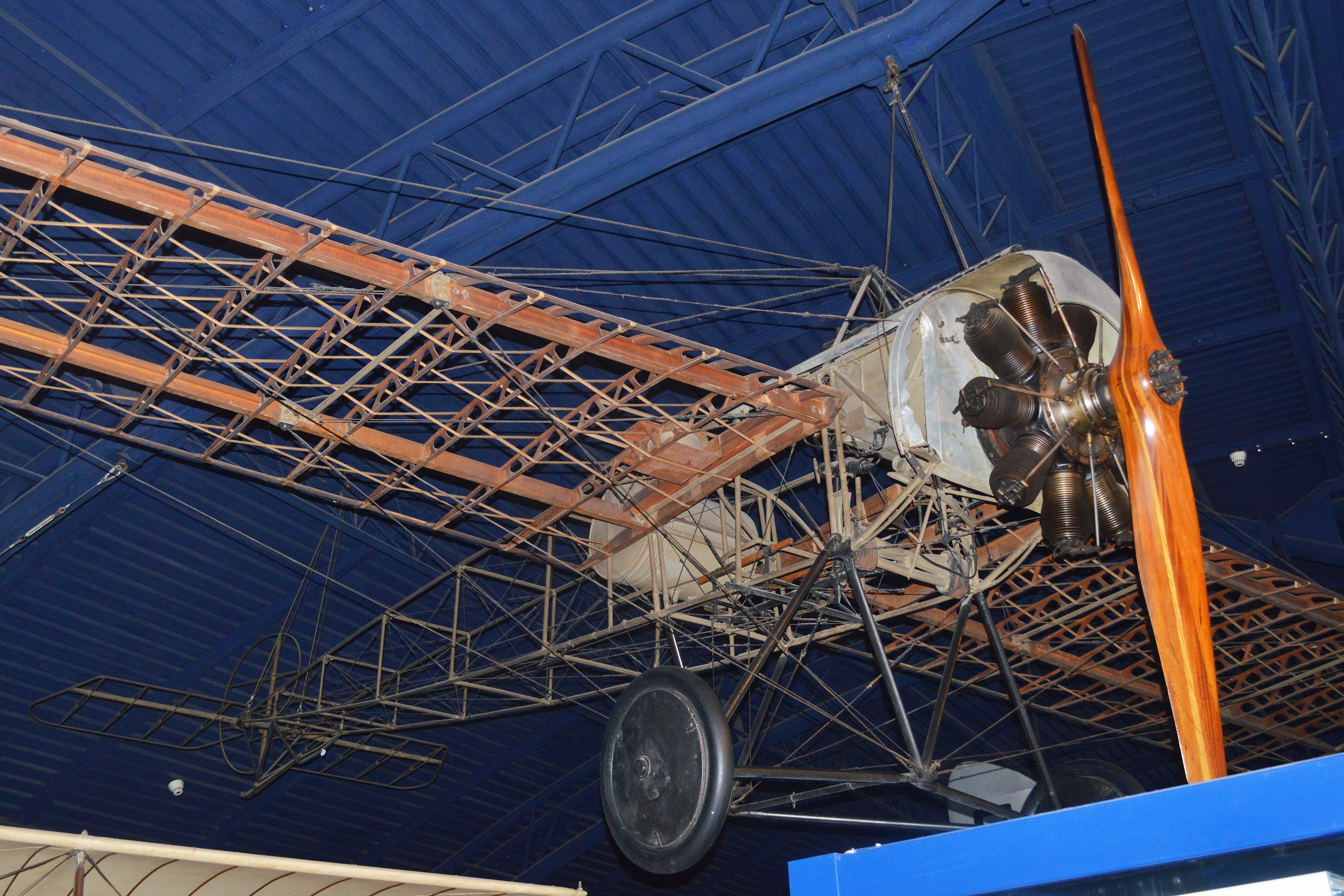
Eindecker 210/16, in the Science Museum, London (2015)

The only known surviving original Eindecker, bearing IdFlieg serial number 210/16, was brought down in the Somme area in 1916 by the British and then evaluated by the War Office until it was transferred to the London Science Museum in 1918. It is currently on display fully assembled, but with its fabric covering removed to illustrate its internal construction.

== Operators ==
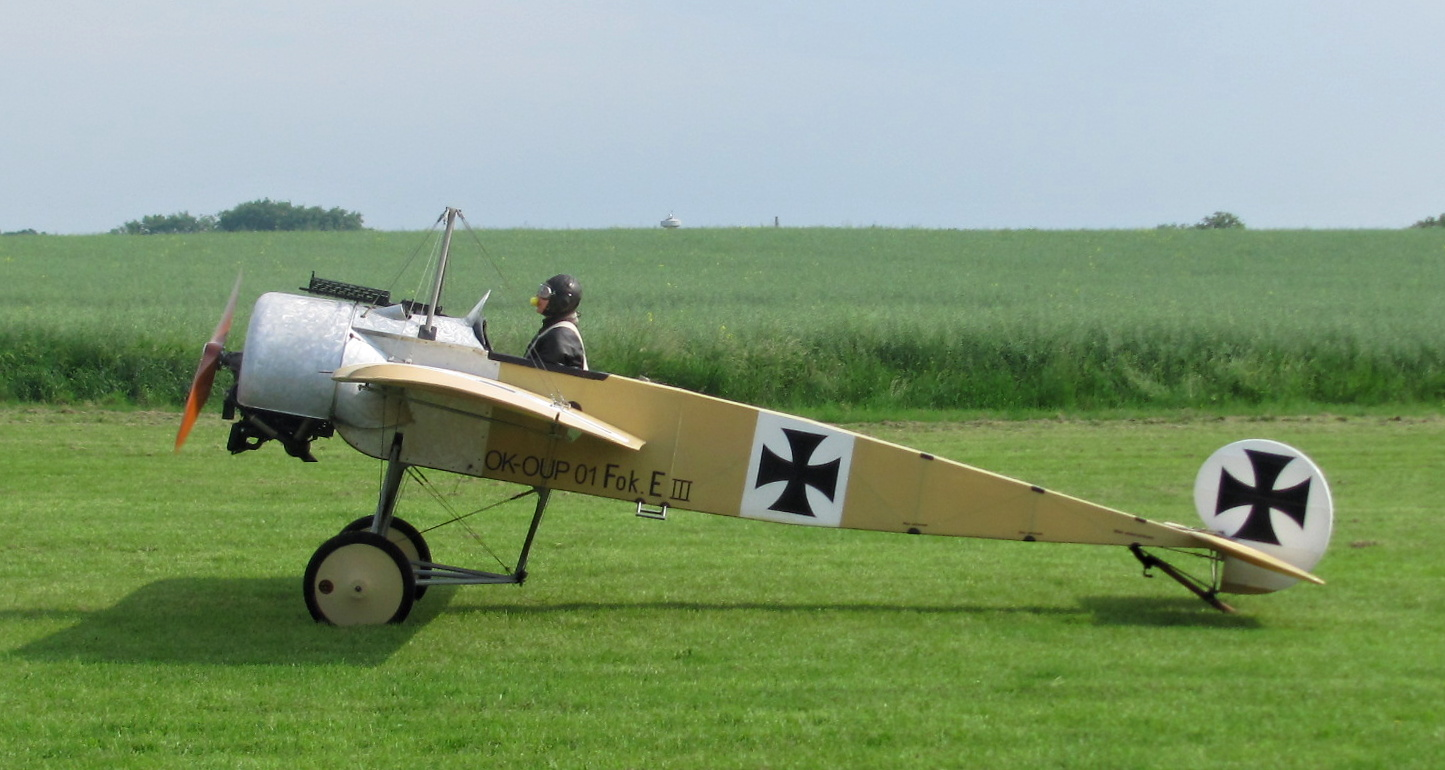
Fokker E.III replica

Austria-Hungary

- Kaiserliche und Königliche Luftfahrtruppen
- Kaiserliche und Königliche Kriegsmarine

Bulgaria

- Bulgarian Air Force

German Empire

- Luftstreitkräfte
- Kaiserliche Marine
  - Marine-Fliegerabteilung

Ottoman Empire

- Ottoman aviation squadrons were supplied with 22 E.III aircraft.

== Specifications (E.III) ==
Data from German Aircraft of the First World War

General characteristics

- Crew: 1
- Length: 7.2 m (23 ft 7 in)
- Wingspan: 9.52 m (31 ft 3 in)
- Height: 2.4 m (7 ft 10 in)
- Wing area: 16 m^{2} (170 sq ft)
- Empty weight: 399 kg (880 lb)
- Gross weight: 610 kg (1,345 lb)
- Powerplant: 1 × Oberursel U.I 9-cyl. rotary engine, 75 kW (100 hp)

Performance

- Maximum speed: 140 km/h (87 mph, 76 kn)
- Endurance: 1.5 hours
- Service ceiling: 3,600 m (11,810 ft)
- Rate of climb: 3.3 m/s (650 ft/min)
- Time to altitude:
  - 1,000 m (3,281 ft) in 5 minutes
  - 3,000 m (9,843 ft) in 30 minutes

Armament

- Guns: 1 × 7.92 mm (0.312 in) LMG 08/15 machine gun offset to starboard, synchronised to fire through the propeller.

== See also ==
- Airdrome Eindecker E-III - replica of the E.III

Related development

- Fokker E.II
- Fokker E.IV

Aircraft of comparable role, configuration, and era

- Morane-Saulnier Type N

Related lists

- List of military aircraft of Germany
- List of fighter aircraft

== Bibliography ==
- Winchester, Jim (2006). Fighter: The World's Finest Combat Aircraft—1913 to the Present Day. Barnes & Noble Publishing, Inc. and Parragon Publishing. ISBN 0-7607-7957-0.
