= Klöckner-Humboldt-Deutz DZ 710 =

16-cylinder, horizontally-opposed, two-cycle diesel engine

DZ 710
- Type: 16-cylinder horizontally-opposed, two cycle diesel engine
- National origin: Germany
- Manufacturer: Klöckner-Humboldt-Deutz / Motorenfabrik Oberursel A.G.
- Developed into: Klöckner-Humboldt-Deutz DZ 720

The Klöckner-Humboldt-Deutz DZ 710 was a German aircraft engine manufactured by Motorenfabrik Oberursel A.G. in the early 1940s. It was a 16-cylinder horizontally-opposed, two cycle diesel engine. A larger 32-cylinder variant, the Klöckner-Humboldt-Deutz DZ 720 was basically two DZ 710's 'bolted' together to make an H engine configuration.

Neither design saw operational use before the end of the war and work on them was halted in late 1945 after the factories were captured by the Allies and turned into makeshift tank repair depots.

== Specifications (DZ 710) ==
=== General characteristics ===
- Type: 16-cylinder liquid-cooled two-bank horizontally-opposed diesel engine
- Bore: 6.3 in (160 mm)
- Stroke: 6.3 in (160 mm)
- Displacement: 3,140 in³ (51.5 L)
- Length: 94.5 in (2400 mm)
- Width: 53.1 in (1350 mm)
- Dry weight: 3,197 lb (1,450 kg)

=== Components ===
- Fuel type: Diesel Fuel
- Cooling system: Liquid-cooled

=== Performance ===
- Power output: 2,700 hp (2,013 kW)
- Compression ratio: 15:1
- Fuel consumption: SFC: 0.33 lb/hp/hr
- Power-to-weight ratio: 0.84 hp/lb (1.39 kW/kg)
