= Fokker Eindecker fighters =

German WWI monoplane aircraft line

Fokker Eindecker III
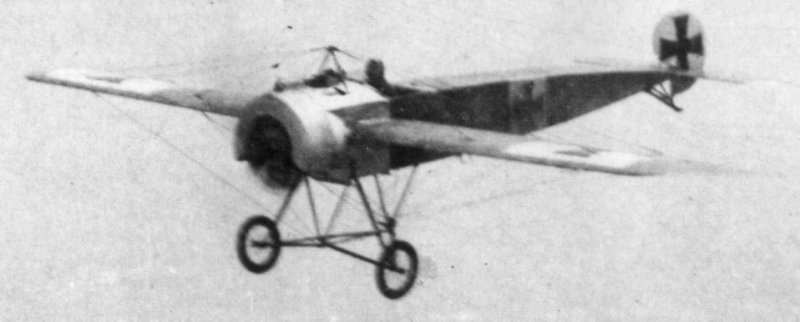
- Captured Fokker E.III 210/16 in flight at Upavon, Wiltshire in 1916.

General information
- Type: Fighter
- Manufacturer: Fokker
- Designer: Martin Kreutzer
- Number built: 416

History
- First flight: 23 May 1915 (modified M.5 A.16/15 serving as a E.I prototype, flown by Otto Parschau)

The Fokker Eindecker fighters were a series of German World War I monoplane single-seat fighter aircraft designed by Dutch engineer Anthony Fokker. Developed in April 1915, the first Eindecker ("Monoplane") was the first purpose-built German fighter aircraft and the first aircraft to be fitted with a synchronization gear, enabling the pilot to fire a machine gun through the arc of the propeller without striking the blades. The Eindecker gave the German Army's Air Service (then the Fliegertruppen des deutschen Kaiserreiches) a degree of air superiority from July 1915 until early 1916. This period, during which Allied aviators regarded their poorly armed aircraft as "Fokker Fodder", became known as the "Fokker Scourge".

== Design and development ==
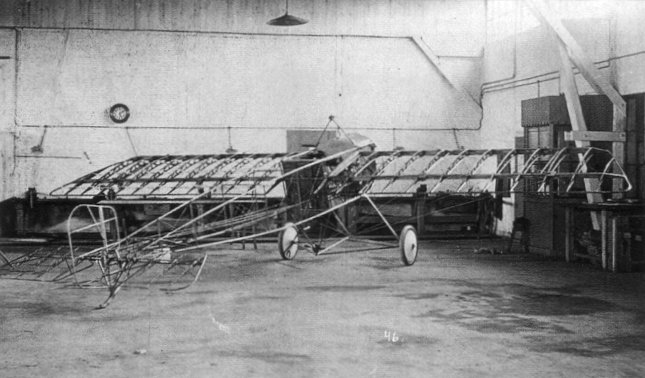
Fokker M. 5K

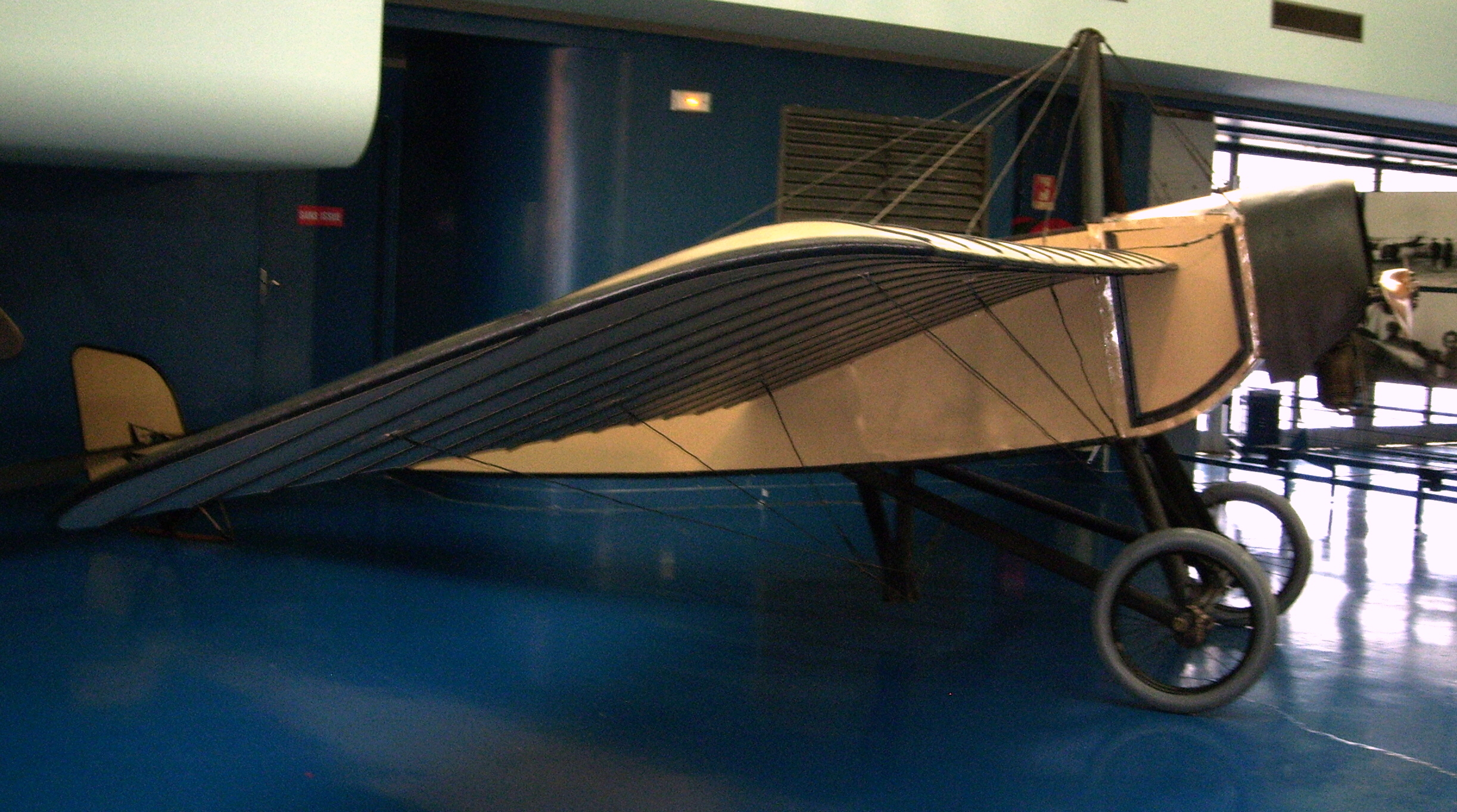
Morane-Saulnier H

The Eindecker was based on Fokker's unarmed Fokker M.5K scout (military designation Fokker A.III) which in turn was based on the design of the French Morane-Saulnier H shoulder-wing monoplane, although it differed in using chrome-molybdenum steel tubing for the fuselage structure instead of wood. It was fitted with an early version of the Fokker gun synchronizer which controlled a single Parabellum MG 14 machine gun. Anthony Fokker personally demonstrated the system on 23 May 1915, having towed the prototype aircraft behind his touring car to a military airfield near Berlin.

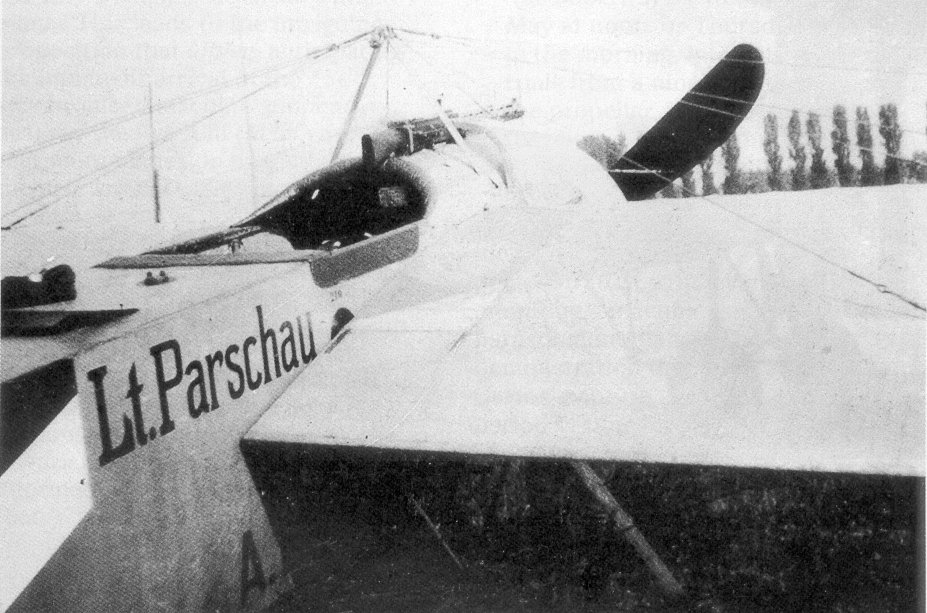
A close-up photo of Otto Parschau's first Fokker monoplane, armed with a synchronized Parabellum MG14 machine gun in May 1915, which essentially became the "prototype" Fokker Eindecker.

=== Leutnant Parschau and the Green Machine (A.16/15) ===
The history of the first Eindecker aircraft (Fokker factory number 216), which was used for Fokker's initial synchronizer trials, is closely associated with Leutnant Otto Parschau, who was allotted this aircraft, then a Fokker A-series unarmed scout with the serial number A.16/15, at the beginning of World War I. This aircraft had been bought in 1913 by Oberleutnant Waldemar von Buttlar, and requisitioned by the Fliegertruppe along with his commissioning as an officer in the Prussian Army at the outbreak of hostilities, and had been painted a shade of green, the color of von Buttlar's previous Jäger regiment. Parschau had served with the same surreptitiously named Brieftauben-Abteilung Ostende (BAO), in Belgium as Oberleutnant von Buttlar in November 1914, where the two German officers could have first made contact. Parschau eventually spent most of the first year of the war with this aircraft, flying it on both the Eastern and Western fronts. At some stage he had the words "Lt. Parschau" painted on the right upper side (and possibly both sides) of the fuselage behind the cockpit. This aircraft had its main fuel tank located behind the cockpit.

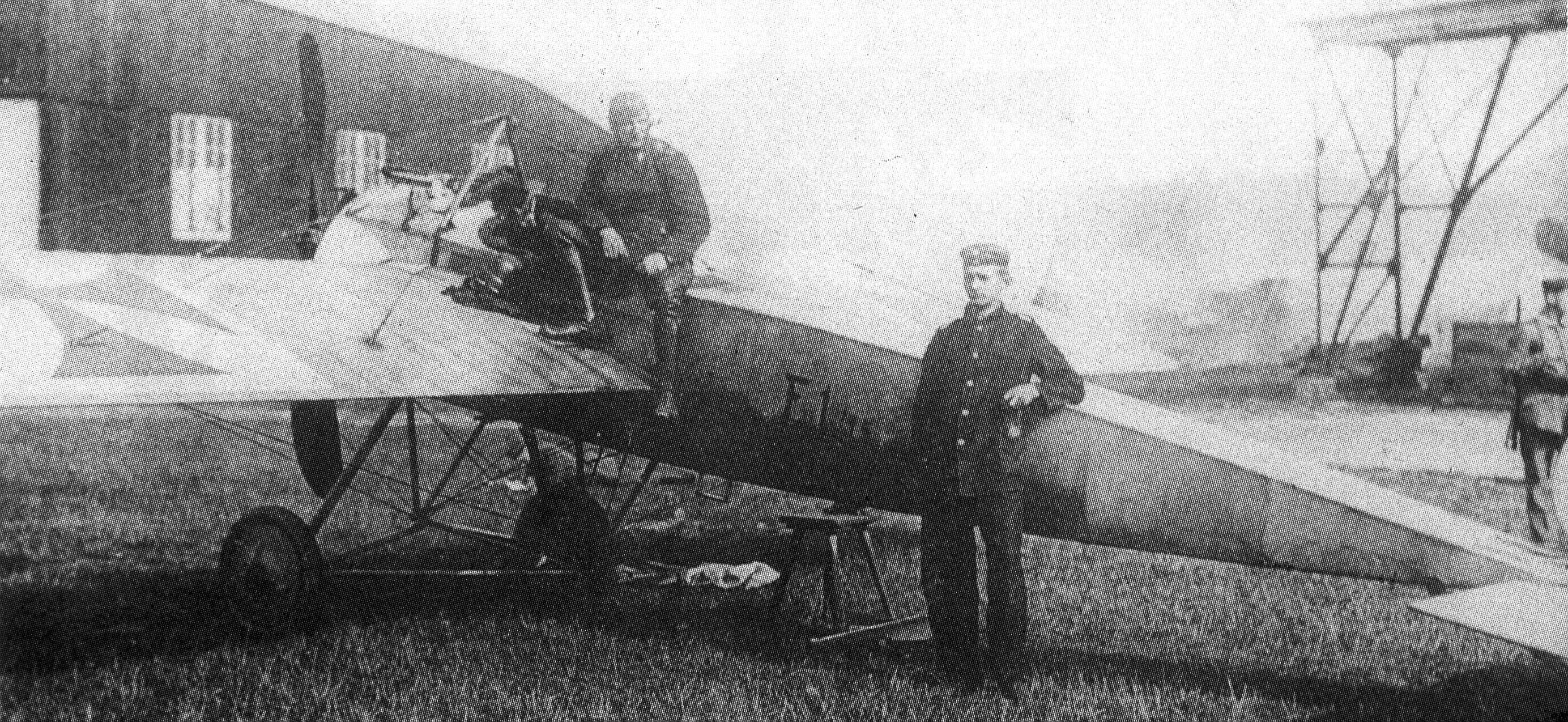
Parschau's second Eindecker, an M.5K/MG Eindecker bearing serial E.1/15 with unique, lowered mid-fuselage wing mount modification

Near the end of May 1915, while it was based at Douai with Feldflieger Abteilung 62, the Fokker factory fitted Parschau's aircraft with the first trial version of the Fokker Stangensteuerung synchronizer and a Parabellum MG14 light machine gun, leaving the wing panels in the stock A.III airframe's shoulder-winged location while armed and in Parschau's use in May and June 1915. Parschau made several attempts at aerial combat during June 1915, but at this stage the gear proved very unreliable, the Parabellum gun repeatedly jamming. As no photos exist verifying any change in wing-panel anchorage location for Parschau's A.16/15 aircraft before its return to the Fokker factory a second time to serve as the "prototype" Eindecker airframe, the belief that it had been modified to have the standard mid-fuselage location used on the later production E.I airframes before its second return to the Fokker factory has not yet been proven, as it was lowered some time after the Fokker factory had received it back to be retained there, following Parschau's final use of it. The mid-fuselage wing mount modification was not fitted to the initial batch of five M.5K/MG production prototypes as originally built, with Otto Parschau's second Eindecker, the first M.5K/MG built bearing IdFlieg serial E.1/15 (bearing Fokker factory airframe number 191, accepted by IdFlieg on 26 May 1915 with shipping date of 15 June 1915) uniquely getting it sometime later, while in service. Production E.Is, and all further Fokker Eindeckers, were also fitted with the definitive version of the Stangensteuerung gear, with a large cam wheel replacing the early drive taken from the oil pump drive shaft.

=== Sheet metal parts finish on the Eindeckers ===
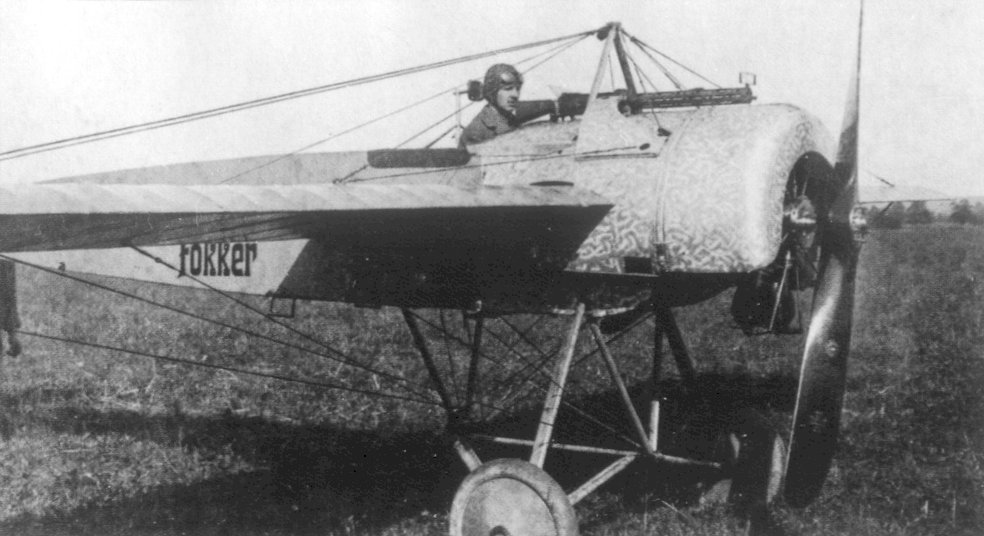
A Fokker E.II of late 1915, with the "dragged" engine turning visible on the engine cowl and associated sheet metal.

One distinctive feature of the appearance of all the sheet metal panelling on the Eindeckers was a special form of "dragged" engine turning performed on all their surfaces, both exposed and internal parts. This distinctive appearance on the sheet metal components of the Eindecker fuselage was also used on the earliest Fokker biplane fighters, like the Fokker D.I but had ceased to be used by the Fokker factory on its designs by the end of 1916.

=== Fuel system details and flight characteristics ===
All the E.I to E.IV Eindeckers used a gravity fuel tank which had to be constantly filled by hand-pumping from the main fuel tank, which, starting with the Fokker E.II, was mounted behind the pilot; this had to be done up to eight times an hour. Both the rudder and elevator were aerodynamically balanced; there were no fixed tail surfaces. This combination rendered the Eindecker very responsive to pitch and yaw. For an inexperienced pilot, the extreme sensitivity of the elevators made level flight difficult; German ace Leutnant Kurt Wintgens, who along with Leutnant Parschau was the primary Fliegertruppe pilot responsible for bringing the first armed Fokker monoplanes into active service during the spring and summer of 1915, once stated "lightning is a straight line compared with the barogram of the first solo". However roll response was poor.

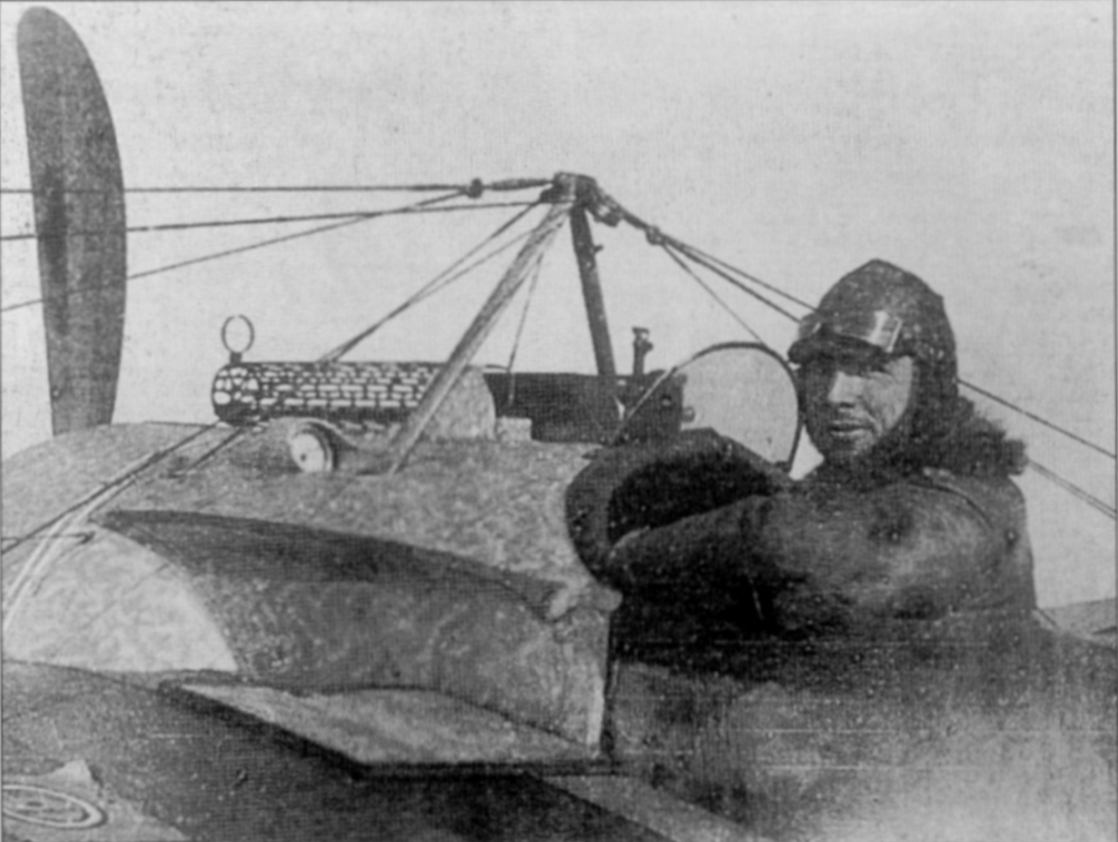
Immelmann's later Fokker E.II with the "soffit" surfaces fitted.

=== Engine installations and associated changes ===
The main difference between the E.I and E.II was the engine, the former having the seven-cylinder 60 kW (80 hp) Oberursel U.0 rotary engine and the latter with the nine-cylinder 75 kW (100 hp) Oberursel U I. The larger diameter of the E.II's nine-cylinder rotary necessitated raising the upper nose paneling to match the larger-diameter cowl the U.I needed, which also caused the outer edges of the upper nose paneling to overhang the fuselage's upper longerons, making it necessary to extend the cowl. Production of the types, built in parallel, depended on engine availability. Many E.IIs were either completed as E.IIIs or upgraded to E.III standard when returned for repair.

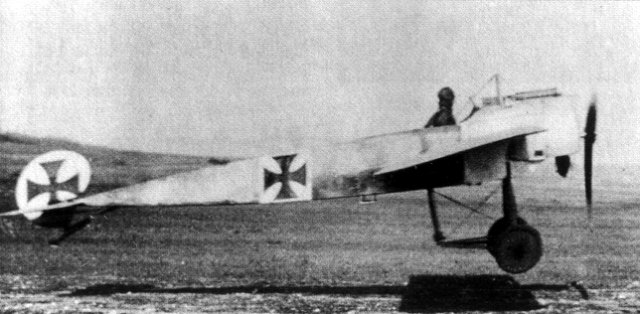
Profile view of an Eindecker at takeoff.

The definitive version of the Eindecker was the Fokker E.III, which used a slightly narrower-chord (1.80 meter, or 71 inch) wing than earlier versions. Boelcke's Feldflieger Abteilung 62 began operating the E.III towards the end of 1915. A few E.IIIs were experimentally armed with two 7.92 mm (.312 in) calibre lMG 08 "Spandau" machine guns, while most E.IIIs and the production E.I through E.III Eindecker models used only one of the same model. The final variant was the Fokker E.IV which received a 119 kW (160 hp) Oberursel U.III, 14 cylinder twin-row rotary engine (a copy of the Gnome Double Lambda rotary) and was fitted with twin machine guns as standard, after repeated failure of an experimental triple-gun installation, which was initially intended be standard for the E.IV.

Total production for the entire Fokker E.I through E.IV series was 416 aircraft (the exact breakdown by type is not clear, although the E.III was the most important model).

== Operational history ==
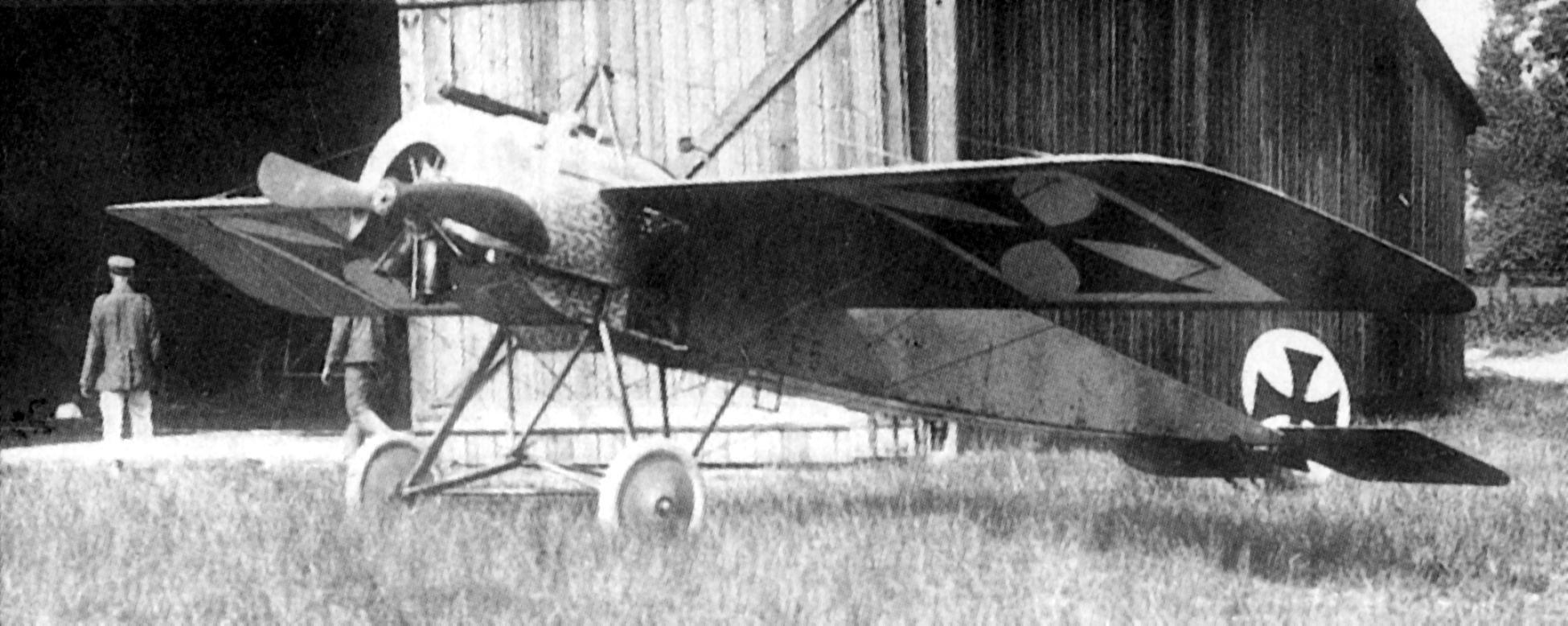
The actual Fokker M.5K/MG aircraft used by Leutnant Kurt Wintgens, in his pioneering aerial engagement on 1 July 1915

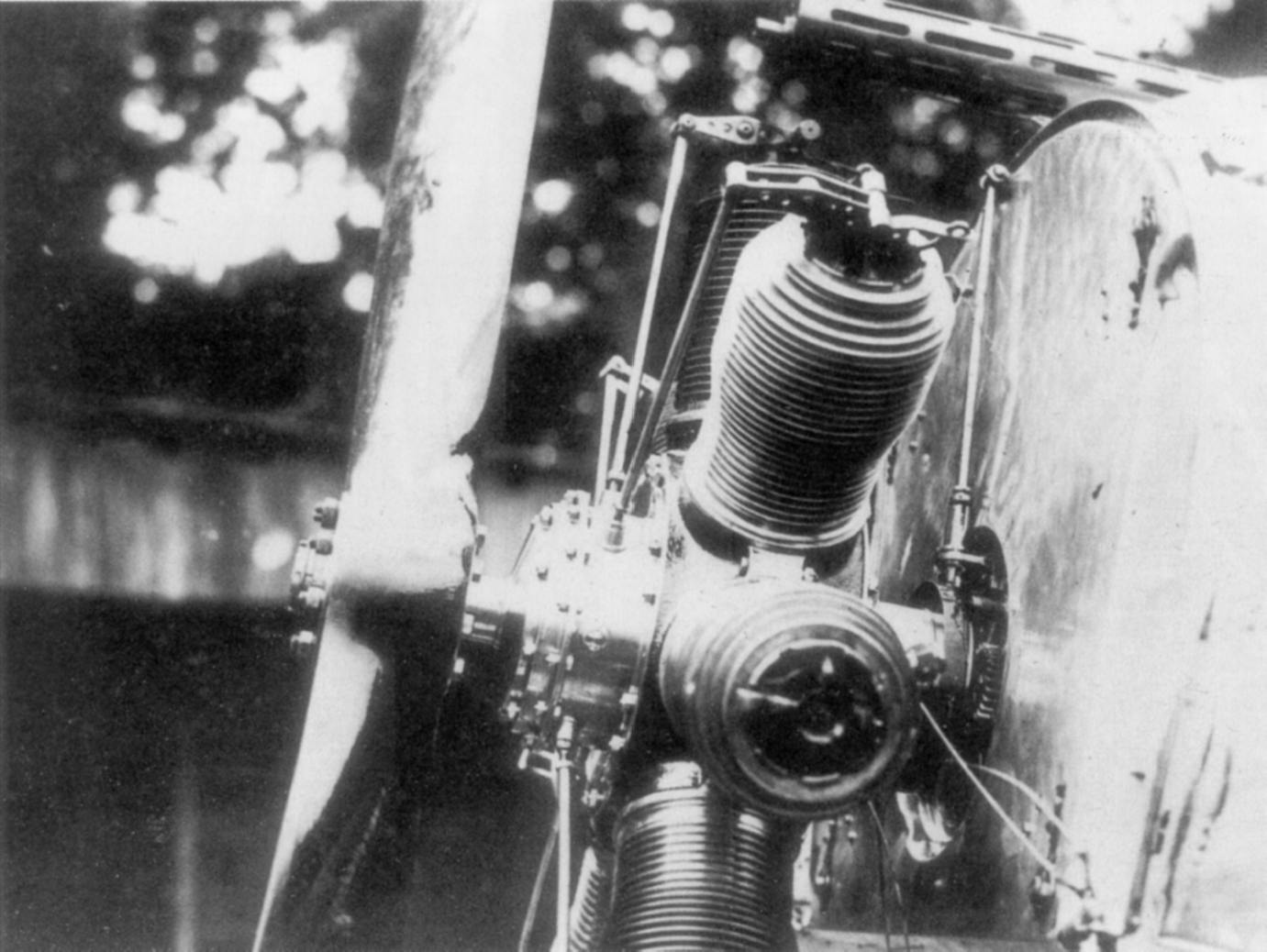
The cowl of an early E.I removed, showing the first version of the Fokker synchronization gear

The first Eindecker victory, though unconfirmed, was achieved by Leutnant Wintgens in the late afternoon of 1 July 1915 when, while flying one of the five M.5K/MG production prototype/"service test" aircraft, numbered 'E.5/15' near Lunéville, he forced down a French Morane-Saulnier L two seat "parasol" monoplane. By this time the first E.Is were arriving as supplementary equipment, one per unit as "attached" aircraft, for the ordinary Feldflieger Abteilung - initially to provide escort protection for their usual quantity of six two-seat reconnaissance biplanes per unit.

Three days after his unconfirmed"victory, Wintgens downed another "Morane Parasol" with the same aircraft, and a fortnight after his initial engagement, on 15 July 1915, he became the first Eindecker pilot to be credited with an official victory.

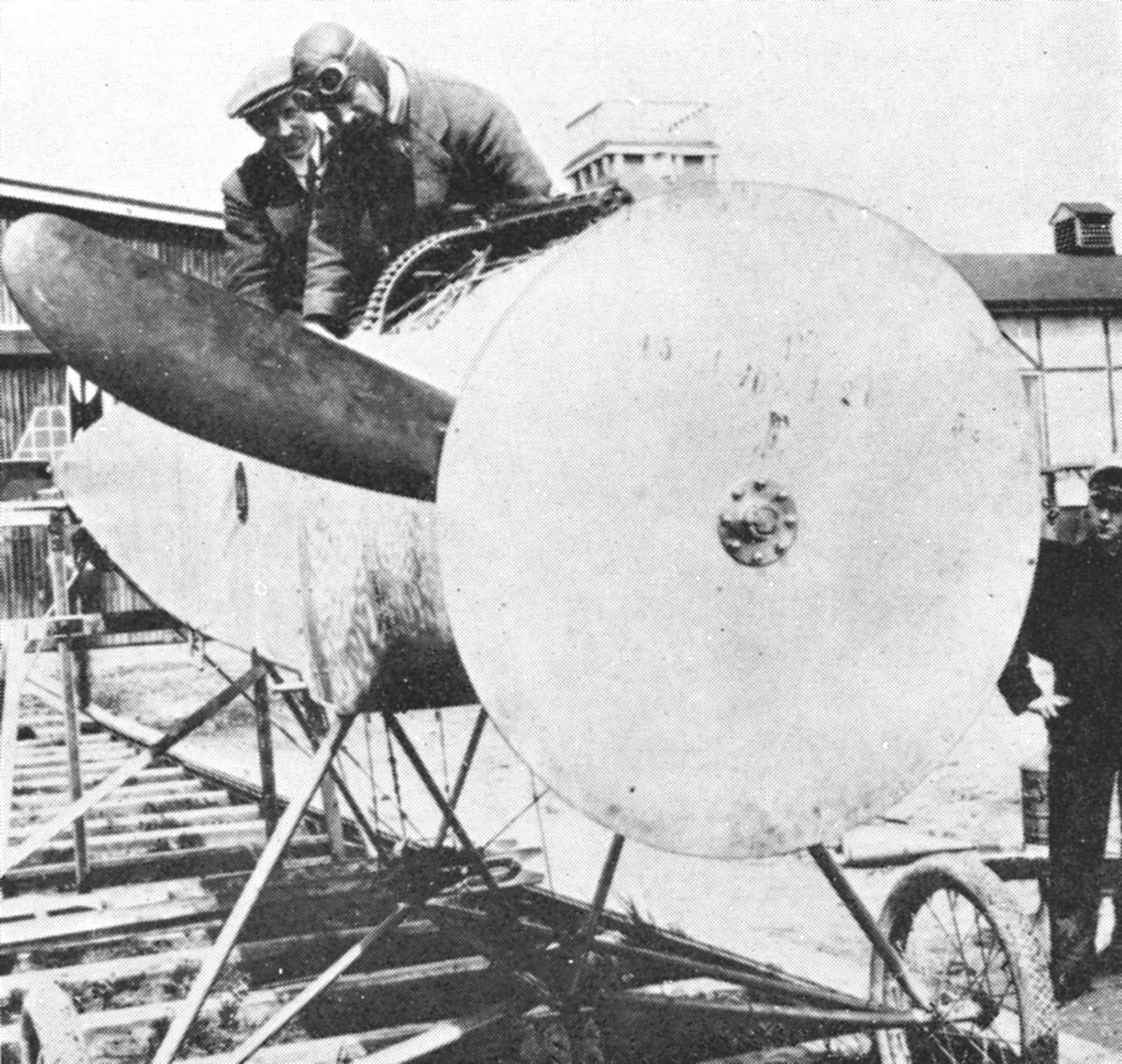
An Eindecker getting its gun synchronizer adjusted

The two most famous Eindecker pilots, both of Feldflieger Abteilung 62, were Oswald Boelcke (initially flying M.5K/MG service test aircraft E.3/15) and Max Immelmann, - who received his first production E.I Eindecker (serial number E.13/15)( just before July 1915's end. Both scored their first kills in E.Is in August 1915, just after Boelcke became the sole pilot flying the E.3/15 service test aircraft. Leutnant Otto Parschau, flew the M.5K/MG aircraft numbered E.1/15 after the Fokker factory took back his now worn-out A.16/15 aircraft a second time, Immelmann's first Eindecker survived the war.

Oswald Boelcke scored the most Eindecker victories - 19 out of his final tally of 40. His last victory in an Eindecker occurred on 27 June 1916. Max Immelmann had the second-highest Eindecker score. He achieved all of his 15 victories in the type before being killed when his E.III broke up in June 1916, possibly after the synchronisation mechanism failed during an attack on British F.E.2bs, causing at least 7 bullets to shoot through one propeller blade, which subsequently broke off. This likely resulted in vibrations so severe that the loads exceeded the structural limits of the aircraft. (Allied accounts credit Corporal J. H. Waller, gunner/observer of a RFC F.E.2b piloted by 2nd Lt G. R. McCubbin, with firing the fatal shots at Immelmann during his attack on their aircraft and was credited by the British with shooting him down.) Eleven pilots scored five or more victories in the Eindecker. Boelcke, Immelmann, Parschau, Hans Berr, and Wintgens each passed eight victories while flying the Eindecker, and so received Germany's highest military decoration, the Pour le Mérite or "Blue Max".

The arrival in early 1916 of the French Nieuport 11 and the British Airco DH.2 brought the dominance of the Eindecker to an end, and with it, the "Fokker Scourge". Wintgens flew the E.IV version of the Eindecker long enough to have been confronted by the much more advanced SPAD S.VII fighter of French flying ace Alfred Heurteaux on 25 September 1916, which resulted in Heurteaux fatally bringing down Wintgens, as Huerteaux's victory number eight.

== Variants ==
Fokker M.5
Fokker's first monoplane unarmed scout, in effect the prototype of all the early Fokker Eindeckers.
Fokker M.5K
K for Kurz; short span wings
Fokker M.5L
L for Lange - long span wings
Fokker M.5K/MG
Pre-production batch, with /MG suffix for maschinengewehr (machine gun); five built. (see A.III above).
Fokker A.II
Military designation for the M.5L unarmed scouting aircraft with three bracing cables per wing and powered by an 80hp Oberursel U.0 rotary engine; at least one was built.
Fokker A.III
Military designation for the M.5K unarmed scouting aircraft powered by an 80hp Oberursel U.0 rotary engine; 5 built (see M.5K/MG).
Fokker E.I
Production armed scout aircraft powered by an 80hp Oberursel U.0 rotary engine; 68 built
Fokker E.II
Improved production armed scout aircraft powered by a 100hp Oberursel U.I rotary engine; 49 built
Fokker E.III
The major production variant also powered by a 100hp Oberursel U.I rotary engine with improved structure and equipment; 249 built
Fokker E.IV
The final version of the early Eindeckers, the E.IV was slightly enlarged, powered by a 14-cyl. Oberursel U.III engine and armed with two machine guns above the forward fuselage; 49 built

Note: The Reinhold Platz-designed Fokker E.V bore no direct relation to the earlier Eindeckers (all designed by Martin Kreutzer), being a parasol aircraft, only built in small numbers before Germany decided to focus their production on the Fokker D.VIII.

== Survivors ==
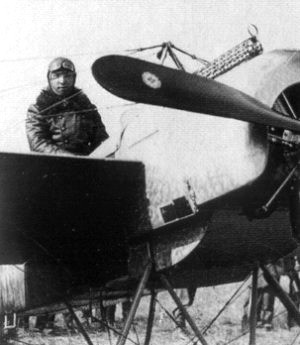
Max Immelman's Fokker E.I, E.13/15

Only one original Eindecker remains. On 8 April 1916, a novice German pilot took off from Valenciennes with a new E.III (IdFlieg serial number 210/16) bound for Wasquehal but became lost in haze and landed at a British aerodrome east of St. Omer. He was forced to surrender before he realised his error and could destroy the aircraft. The aircraft was test-flown against the Morane-Saulnier N and other Allied types at St. Omer before being sent to Upavon in Wiltshire for evaluation. It is now on display, without the fabric covering, at the Science Museum in London. Immelmann's original E.I, serial number E.13/15, also survived the war and went on display in Dresden, where it was destroyed by Allied bombing during World War II.

== Specifications (E.III) ==
Data from German Aircraft of the First World War

General characteristics

- Crew: 1
- Length: 7.2 m (23 ft 7 in)
- Wingspan: 9.52 m (31 ft 3 in)
- Height: 2.4 m (7 ft 10 in)
- Wing area: 16 m^{2} (170 sq ft)
- Empty weight: 399 kg (880 lb)
- Gross weight: 610 kg (1,345 lb)
- Powerplant: 1 × Oberursel U.I 9-cyl.air-cooled rotary piston engine, 75 kW (100 hp)

Performance

- Maximum speed: 140 km/h (87 mph, 76 kn)
- Range: 198 km (123 mi, 107 nmi)
- Endurance: 1.5 hours
- Service ceiling: 3,600 m (11,810 ft)
- Rate of climb: 3.333 m/s (656.1 ft/min)
- Time to altitude:
  - 1,000 m (3,281 ft) in 5 minutes
  - 3,000 m (9,843 ft) in 30 minutes
- Wing loading: 38 kg/m^{2} (7.8 lb/sq ft)

Armament

- Guns: 1 × 7.92 mm (0.312 in) lMG 08 Spandau machine gun offset to starboard, synchronised to fire through the propeller.
