= Fokker E.I =

German fighter aircraft during WWI

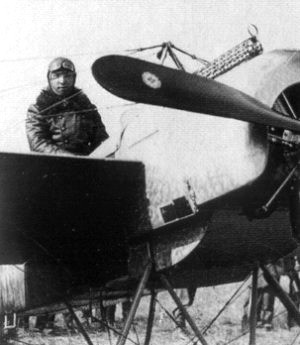
- Max Immelmann of Feldflieger Abteilung 62 in the cockpit of his Fokker E.I., bearing IdFlieg serial E.13/15

General information
- Type: Fighter
- Manufacturer: Fokker-Flugzeugwerke
- Designer: Anthony Fokker & Martin Kreutzer
- Primary user: Luftstreitkräfte
- Number built: 54

History
- Manufactured: 1915–1916
- Introduction date: June 1915
- First flight: Early 1915

The Fokker E.I was the first fighter aircraft to enter service with the Fliegertruppe of the Deutsches Heer in World War I. Its arrival at the front in mid-1915 marked the start of a period known as the "Fokker Scourge" during which the E.I and its successors achieved a measure of air superiority over the Western Front.

== Design and development ==
The E.I was essentially an armed version of the Fokker M.5K single-seat reconnaissance aircraft (military designation A.III), which was in turn very closely based on the design of the 1913 French Morane-Saulnier Type H. Like the Morane, the Fokker was an externally braced mid-winged monoplane with a vertically tapered box section fuselage, with fully movable horizontal and vertical stabilizing surfaces, also known as "flying" surfaces, giving the pilot the usual tail control functions; roll control was achieved through controlled wing warping, as was conventional in contemporary monoplanes. Wing warping was achieved through external cables attached to the wing's rear spar, and running through a king post located in the front of the cockpit. The fuselage structure was fabric covered welded chromium-molybdenum steel tubing, the biggest difference between the Fokker and the Morane, which had an entirely wooden framework. Welded "cromoly" steel tube provided the basis for the structure of all Fokker fuselages for many years.

This unremarkable and derivative design was, however, transformed into a formidable fighter when it was fitted with the newly developed synchronizer gear, the Fokker Stangensteuerung system, firing a single 7.92 mm (.312 in) Parabellum LMG 14 or Spandau lMG 08 machine gun through the spinning propeller. Indeed, the five production prototype airframes for the E.I design had been ordered and were under construction as A.IIIs but were completed as M.5K/MG aircraft, retaining the earlier "shoulder-wing" placement of the A.III type. Subsequent production E.Is had their wings lowered slightly – as Leutnant Otto Parschau's E.1/15 had later in its career during 1915 – from the M.5's shoulder configuration, which improved pilot visibility. (These were designated by Fokker as the M.14, which was also used for the following two Eindecker variants.)

All Fokker E.I aircraft had a 68.5 L (18.1 US gal) capacity, single gravity fuel tank, located forward of the cockpit, with a fuel gauge protruding from the sheet metal upper nose paneling, usually offset slightly to port.

== Operational history ==
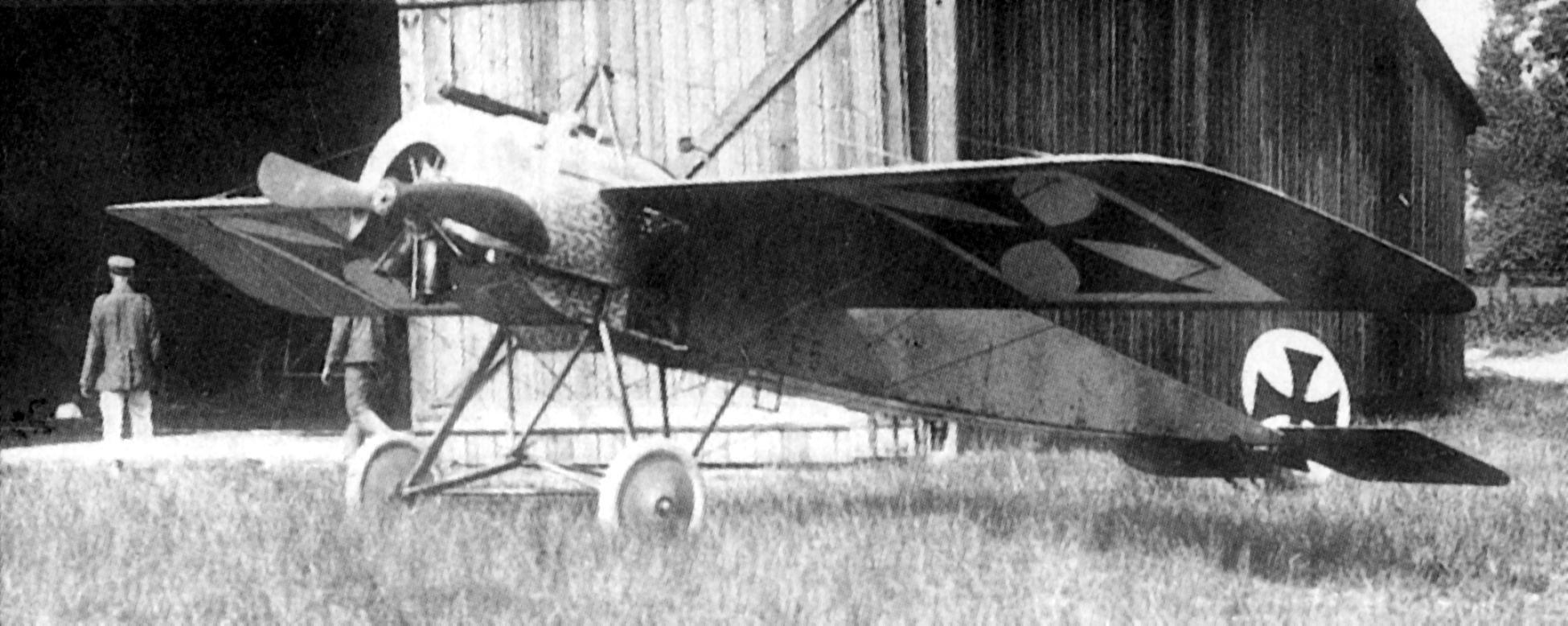
Leutnant Kurt Wintgens' "E.5/15" Eindecker, the first fighter aircraft to use a synchronized machine gun to shoot down an opposing aircraft, as it appeared for the 1 July engagement

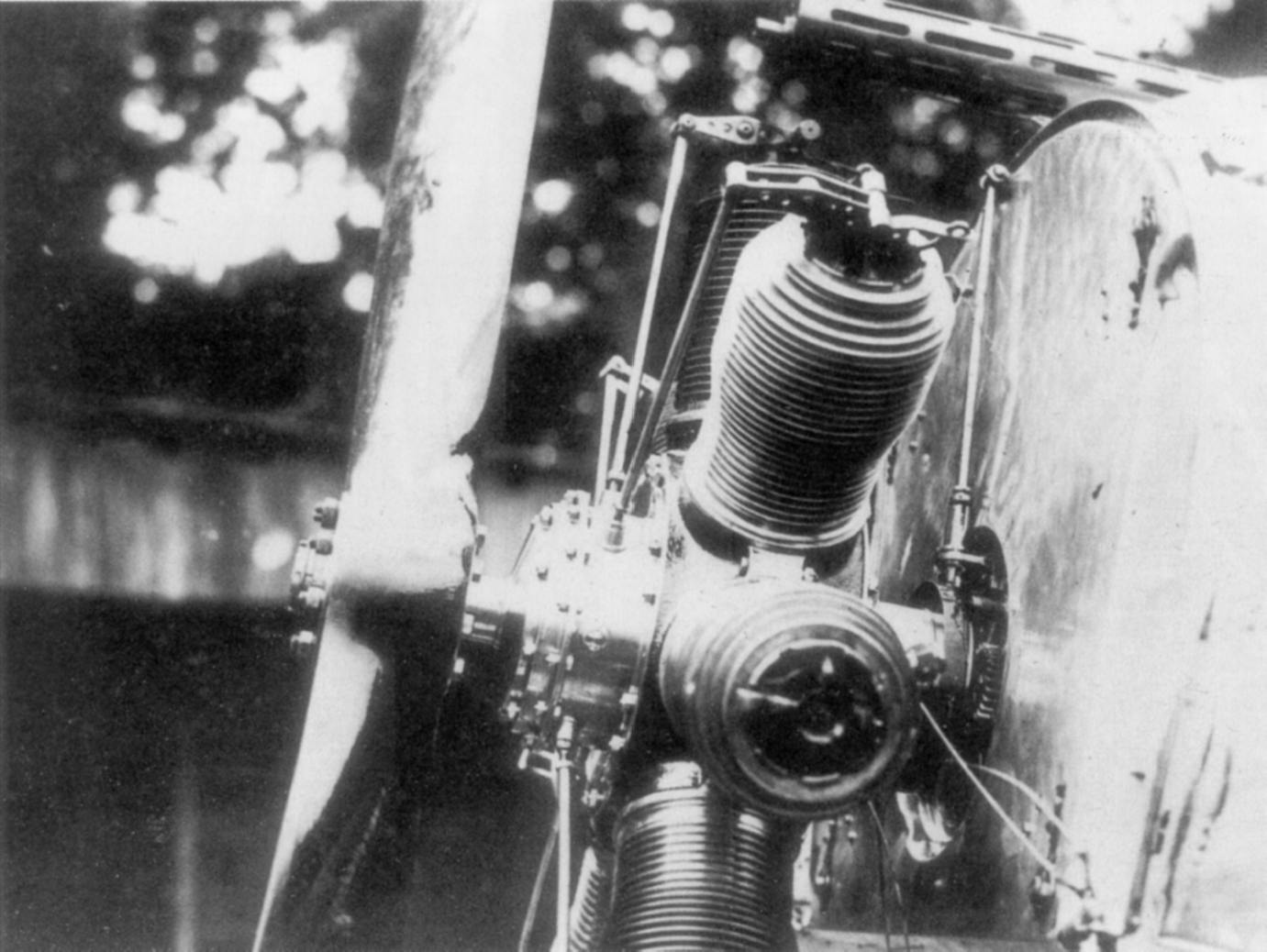
E.I with cowl removed, showing the Oberursel U.0 rotary engine and Stangensteuerung synchronizer's initial drive components

Two German pilots, Leutnants Otto Parschau and Kurt Wintgens, worked closely with Anthony Fokker in early 1915 during evaluation of the M.5K/MG. Wintgens is known to have downed a two-seat Morane-Saulnier Type L parasol monoplane on 1 July 1915 while flying his M.5K/MG, but as the victory occurred in the airspace behind Allied lines, over the Forêt de Parroy near Lunéville, this could not be confirmed at the time. A similar victory over another Morane "Parasol" two-seater, again unconfirmed, was scored by Wintgens three days later. On the 15th, Wintgens scored his first confirmed victory over a third Morane Parasol, the earliest known confirmed aerial victory for anyone flying a Fokker E-series monoplane in combat.

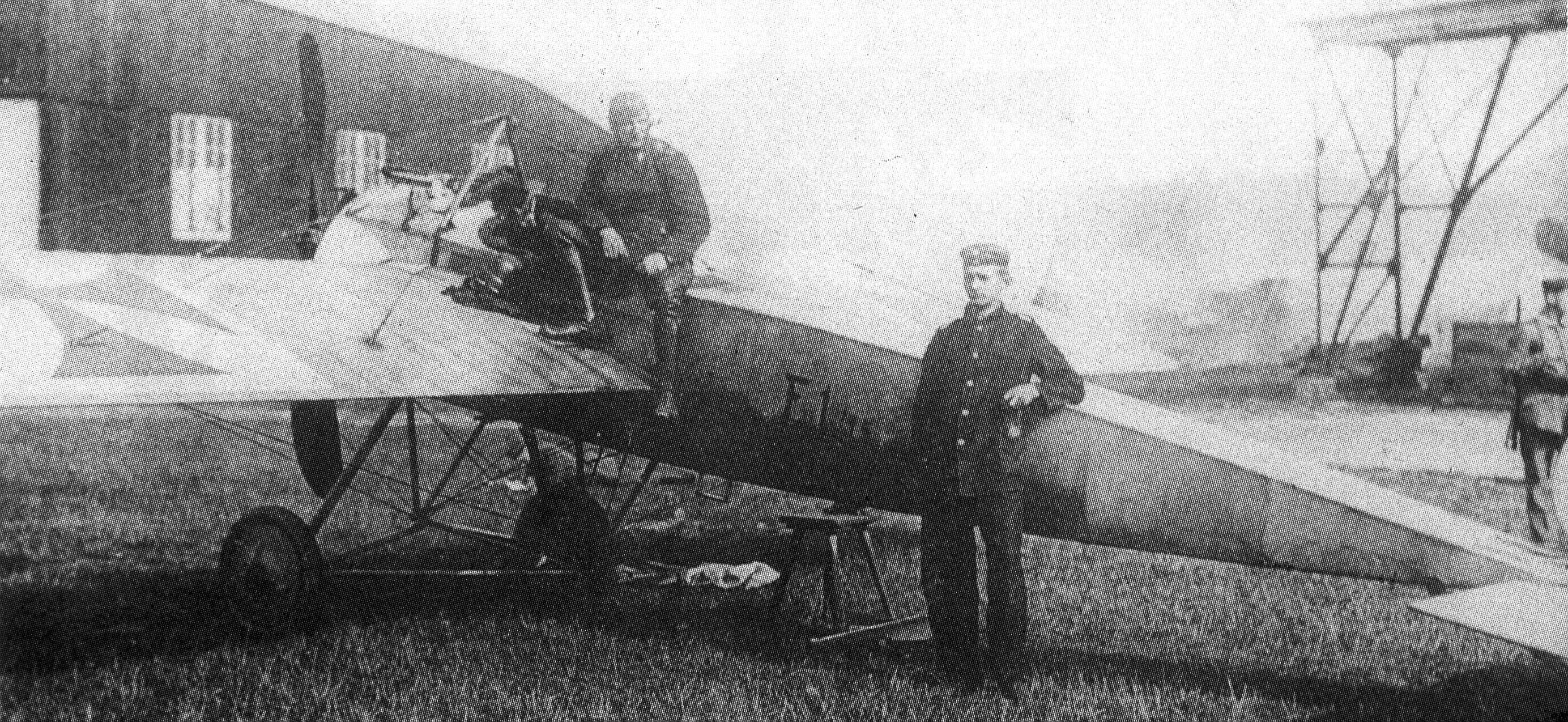
Otto Parschau's E.1/15 Eindecker, the first to have the lowered wing location

The M.5K/MG usually used the Parabellum MG14 machine gun for the synchronized armament, which could prove to be a troublesome arrangement, and the five M.5K/MGs built by the Fokker factory in Schwerin/Gorries retained the "shoulder-wing" position of the M.5k for the monoplane wing. Parschau's E.1/15 later had its wing lowered to the "mid-wing" position of the production E.Is, while the remaining four were not known to have been changed. Oswald Boelcke, future German aerial tactician, was issued the third production M.5K/MG, which he flew during July 1915 with Feldfliegerabteilung 62, based at La Brayelle Airfield near Douai and shared flying time with Max Immelmann After Boelcke achieved his own first aerial victory on 4 July with an Albatros C.I armed two-seat observation aircraft, Boelcke would score his first single-seater victory with E.3/15, over a B.E.2c British two-seater near Arras on 19 August 1915. Immelmann would very soon receive his own lMG 08-armed, early production-line E.I, serialed E.13/15 for his own use.

E.Is were mainly flown by regular pilots of the Fliegertruppen des deutschen Kaiserreiches, with one Eindecker attached to each six-aircraft Feldflieger Abteilung aerial observation/reconnaissance unit. The first step towards specialist fighter-only aviation units within the German military was the establishment of the so-called Kampfeinsitzer Kommando (single-seat battle unit, abbreviated as "KEK") formations by Inspektor-Major Friedrich Stempel in February 1916, as the E.Is started to leave front-line service.

Following the era of the "KEK" units through the summer of 1916, the Fliegertruppen forces were renamed the Luftstreitkräfte in October 1916, with both units directly serving the German Army; the formation of specialised Jastas (fighter squadrons) in the German air service was still to come. Two E.Is were supplied to the Austro-Hungarian air force and five to the Kaiserliche Marine in April 1916. The E.I was soon joined by the improved Fokker E.II and, as the first E.Is were entering service in June 1915, the first of the E.II type was being demonstrated by Anthony Fokker. Nevertheless, E.I production continued in parallel with the E.II, depending on the availability of the Oberursel engines. By 1916, a total of 54 had been manufactured and delivered to the German Army, Navy and the Austro-Hungarian army.

== Operators ==
Austria-Hungary

- Kaiserliche und Königliche Luftfahrtruppen

German Empire

- Luftstreitkräfte
- Imperial German Navy

Turkey

- Ottoman Air Force

== Specifications (E.I.) ==
Data from

General characteristics

- Crew: 1
- Length: 7.22 m (23 ft 8 in)
- Wingspan: 8.85 m (29 ft 0 in)
- Height: 2.9 m (9 ft 6 in)
- Wing area: 15.9 m^{2} (171 sq ft)
- Empty weight: 360 kg (794 lb)
- Gross weight: 563 kg (1,241 lb)
- Powerplant: 1 × Motorenfabrik Oberursel U.0 7-cylinder air-cooled rotary engine (clone of Gnome Lambda engine), 60 kW (80 hp)
- Propellers: 2-bladed wooden fixed-pitch propeller, 2.3–2.5 m (7 ft 7 in – 8 ft 2 in) diameter

Performance

- Maximum speed: 130 km/h (81 mph, 70 kn)
- Cruise speed: 110 km/h (68 mph, 59 kn)
- Range: 198 km (123 mi, 107 nmi)
- Service ceiling: 3,000 m (9,800 ft)
- Time to altitude: 2,000 m (6,600 ft) in 20 minutes

Armament

- Guns: 1 × forward-firing 7.92 mm (.312 in) Spandau lMG 08 machine gun (one Parabellum MG14 M/G on prototypes)

== See also ==
Related development

- Fokker E.II
- Fokker M.5

Related lists

- List of military aircraft of Germany
