= Morane-Saulnier H =

Type of aircraft

Type H
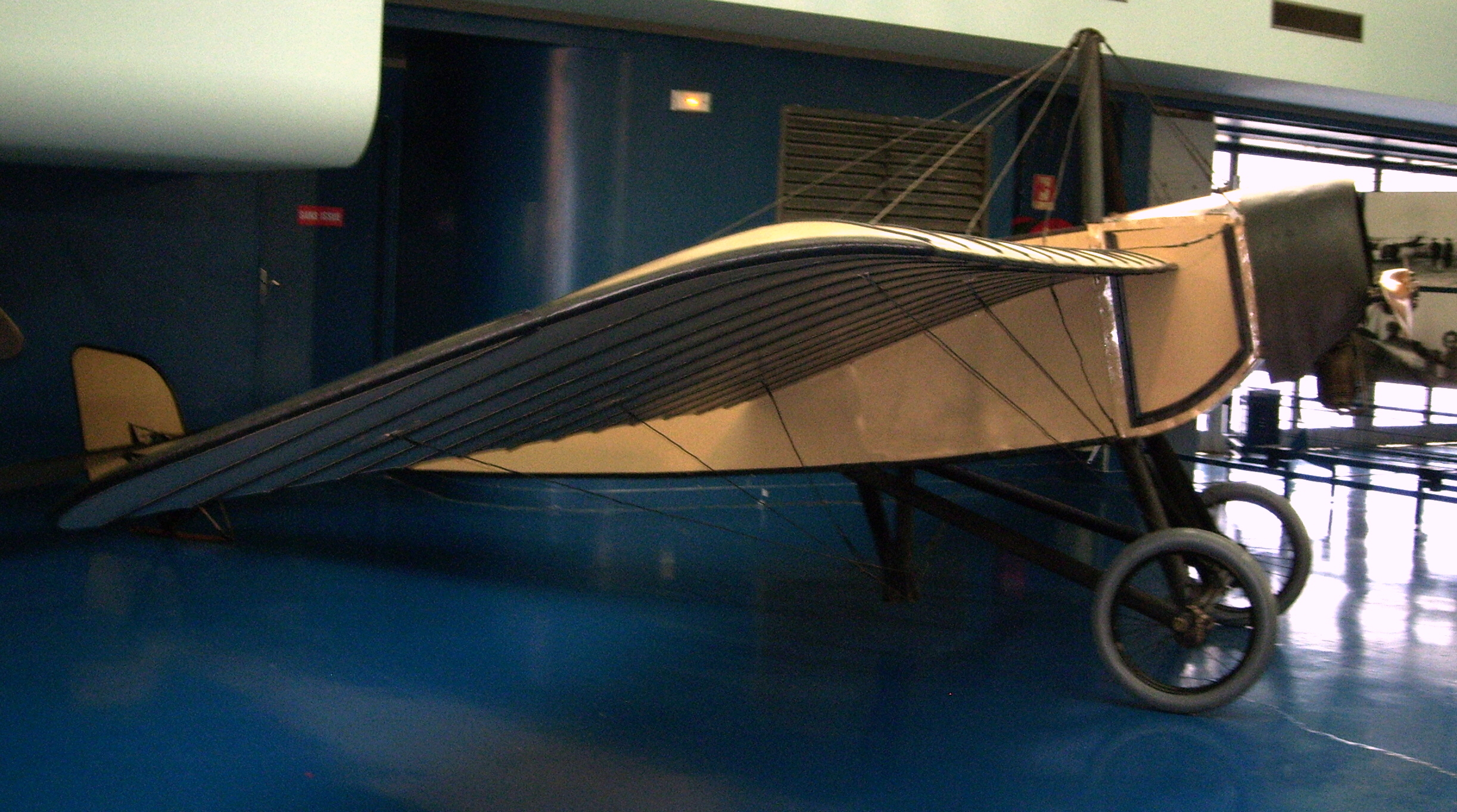
- Morane Saulnier Type H on display at the Musée de l'Air et de l'Espace at Paris Le Bourget airport

General information
- Type: Sport aircraft
- Manufacturer: Morane-Saulnier

History
- First flight: 1913
- Developed from: Morane-Saulnier G
- Variant: Morane-Saulnier L

The Morane-Saulnier H was an early aircraft first flown in France in the months immediately preceding the First World War; it was a single-seat derivative of the successful Morane-Saulnier G with a slightly reduced wingspan Like the Type G, it was a successful sporting and racing aircraft: examples serving with the French army were used in the opening phases of the war.

German versions, the Fokker Eindecker fighters, were armed with forward-firing machine guns and became the first single-seat fighter aircraft so armed.

== Service use ==
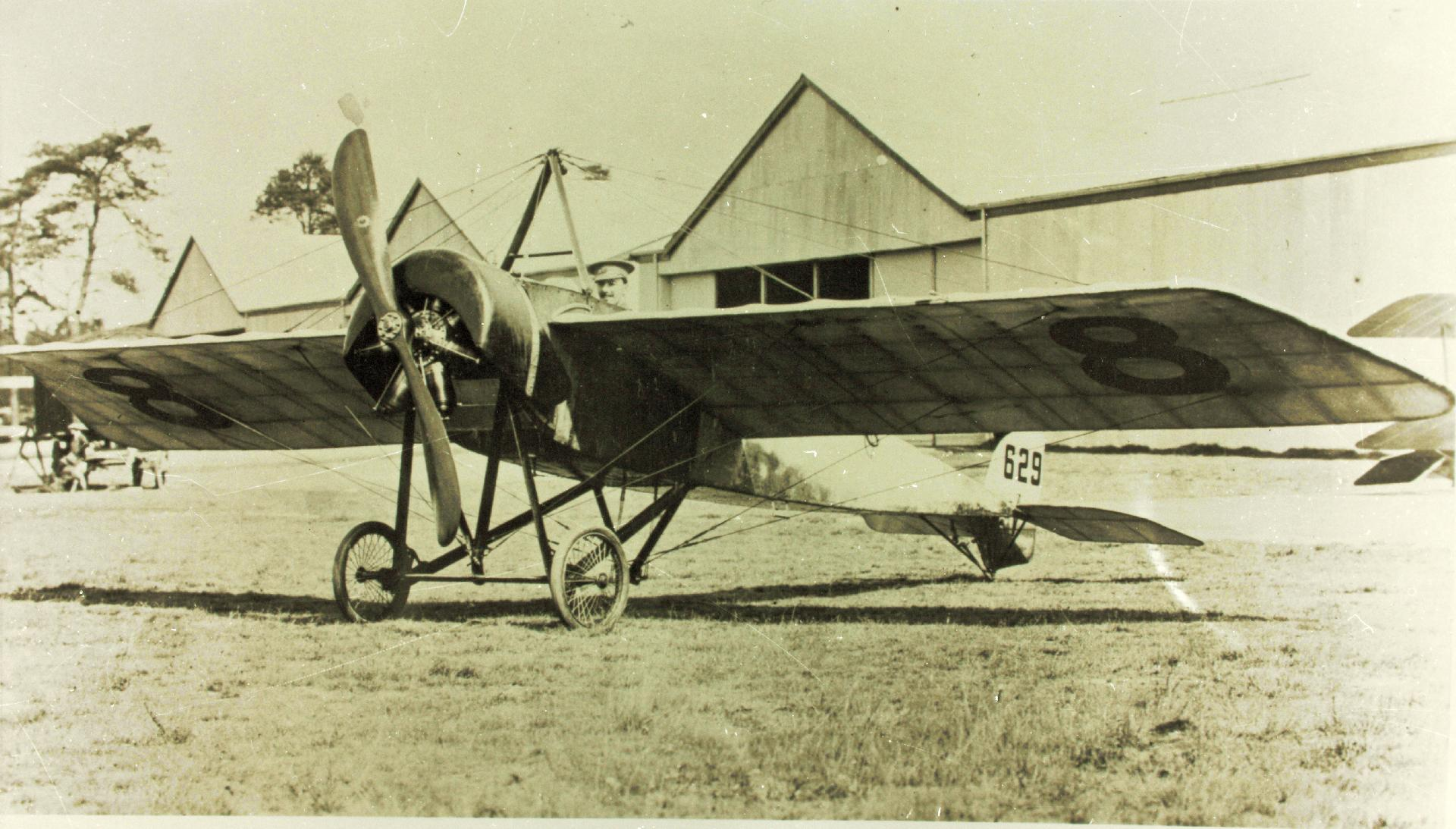
Royal Flying Corps Morane-Saulnier H built by Grahame-White

During the second international aero meet, held at Wiener Neustadt in June 1913, Roland Garros won the precision landing prize in a Type H. Later that same year, a Morane-Saulnier H was used to complete the first non-stop flight across the Mediterranean, from Fréjus in the south of France to Bizerte in Tunisia.

The French Army ordered a batch of 26 aircraft under the designation MoS.1. French-built machines saw limited service in the opening stages of World War I, with pilots carrying out reconnaissance missions and occasionally engaging in aerial combat using revolvers and carbines. The British Royal Flying Corps also acquired a small number, impressing three civilian-owned aircraft on the outbreak of the war, and ordering 36 machines Grahame-White, who was manufacturing the type in the UK under licence in two batches. The RFC mainly used the Type Hs for training, with only one example seeing service with operational squadrons (4 and 12 Squadrons).

== German copies ==
A German-built copy entered production as the Fokker M.5 in 1913: it featured a slightly longer fuselage, framed in steel tube rather than wood, a comma shaped rudder, and a redesigned undercarriage integrated with the under-wing bracing pylons. When armed in 1915 with a synchronised machine gun it became the first of the Fokker "Eindecker" monoplane fighters.

The type was also produced under licence in Germany by the Pfalz Flugzeugwerke: during the war the company built armed versions as the E.I, E.II, E.IV, E.V, and E.VI, with increasingly powerful engines. Like the better known Fokkers, with which they were often confused by Allied airmen, these were armed with a single, synchronised lMG 08 machine gun.

== Surviving aircraft ==
A Type H is preserved at the Musée de l'Air et de l'Espace in Le Bourget and another at the Fantasy of Flight in Florida. Several replicas are in museums or flying.

== Variants ==
=== Morane-Saulnier versions ===
- Type G two seater
- Type H single seater
- Type L parasol monoplane
- Type M armoured single seater
- Type O racing monoplane developed from H, two built including one for Roland Garros that was fitted with wheels and floats
- MoS.1 Official designation for Type H
- MoS.2 Official designation for Type G
- MoS.3 Official designation for Type L
- MoS.13 Official designation for Type M

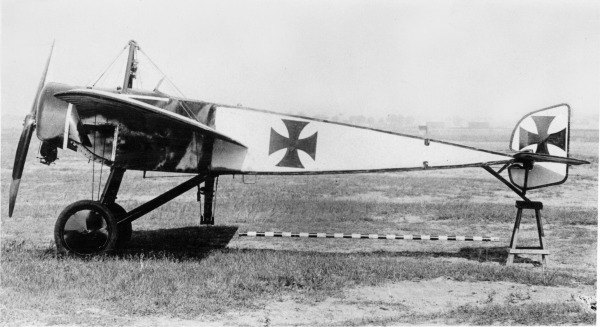
Pfalz E.I side view

=== Pfalz versions ===
- E.I - with Oberursel U.0 rotary engine (45 built)
- E.II - with Oberursel U.I rotary engine (130 built)
- E.IV - with Oberursel U.III rotary engine (46 built)
- E.V - with Mercedes D.I water-cooled, inline engine (20 built)
- E.VI - with Oberursel U.I engine, lengthened fuselage, enlarged tail fin and reduced bracing (20 built as trainers)

== Operators ==
Swiss Morane-Saulnier H

France

- Aéronautique Militaire

Austria-Hungary

- Austro-Hungarian Navy - (Pfalz-built versions)

Belgium

- Belgian Air Force

Denmark

- Army Flying Service - 2 examples.

Germany

- Luftstreitkräfte - (Pfalz-built versions)

Portugal

- Portuguese Air Force - one aircraft.

United Kingdom

- Royal Flying Corps

Russia

- Imperial Russian Air Service

Switzerland

- Swiss Air Force - one aircraft

== Specifications ==
General characteristics

- Crew: One pilot
- Length: 5.84 m (19 ft 2 in)
- Wingspan: 9.12 m (29 ft 11 in)
- Height: 2.26 m (7 ft 5 in)
- Empty weight: 188 kg (415 lb)
- Gross weight: 444 kg (979 lb)
- Powerplant: 1 × Le Rhône 9C , 60 kW (80 hp)

Performance

- Maximum speed: 120 km/h (75 mph, 65 kn)
- Range: 177 km (111 mi, 96 nmi)
- Service ceiling: 1,000 m (3,280 ft)
