= Fokker E.II =

Airplane

E.II
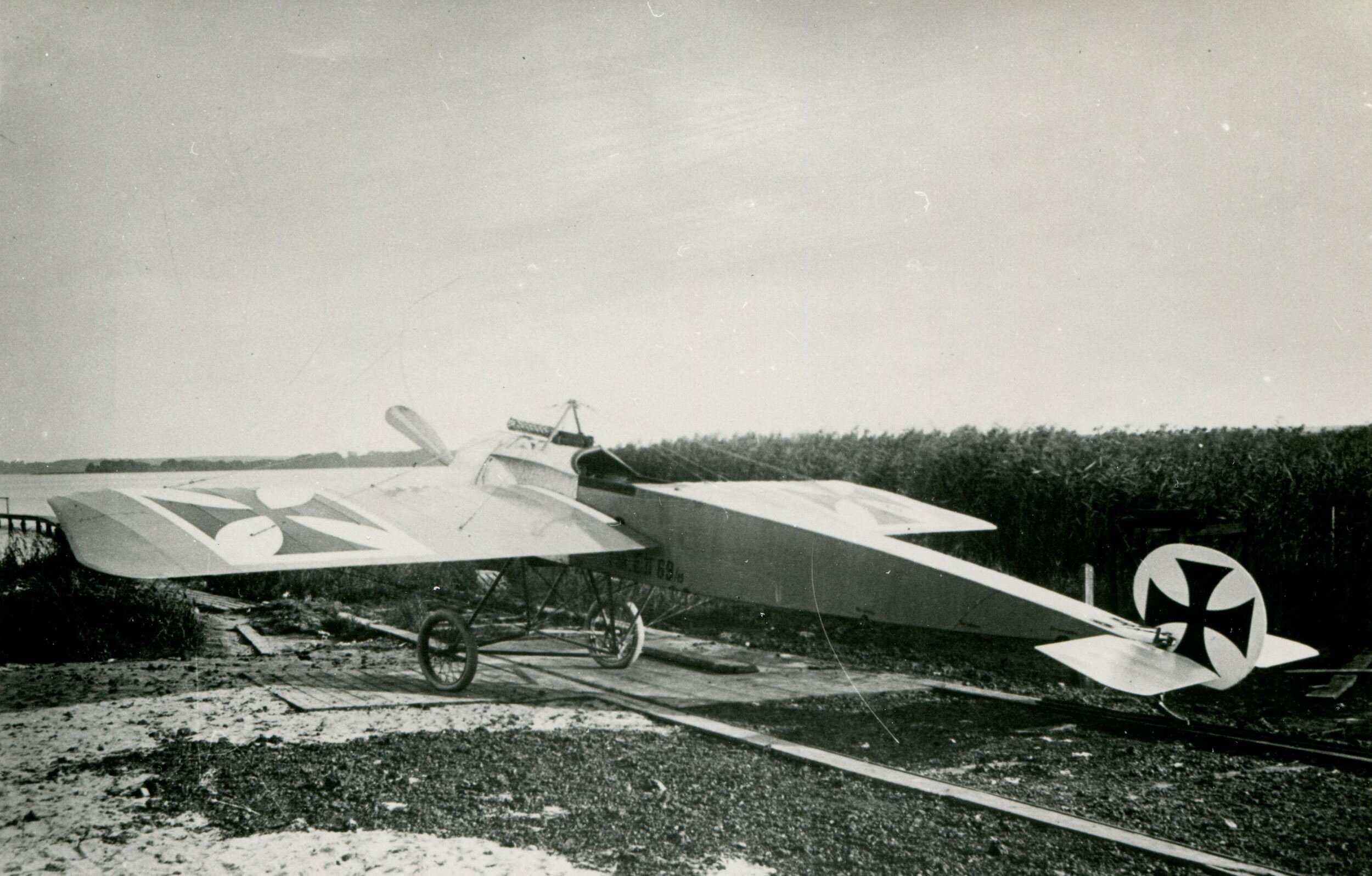

General information
- Type: Fighter
- Manufacturer: Fokker-Flugzeugwerke
- Designer: Anthony Fokker
- Primary user: Luftstreitkräfte
- Number built: 49

History
- Manufactured: 1915
- Introduction date: June 1915
- First flight: 13 June 1915
- Variants: Fokker E.I, Fokker E.III

The Fokker E.II was the second variant of the German Fokker Eindecker single-seat monoplane fighter aircraft of World War I. The E.II was essentially a Fokker E.I with the 75 kW (100 hp) Oberursel U.I 9-cylinder rotary engine, a close copy of the French Gnôme Monosoupape rotary of the same power output, in place of the E.I's 60 kW (80 hp) Oberursel U.0, but whereas the E.I was simply a M.5K with a 7.92 mm (.312 in) machine gun bolted to it, the E.II was designed with the weapon system integrated with its airframe.

== Design and development ==
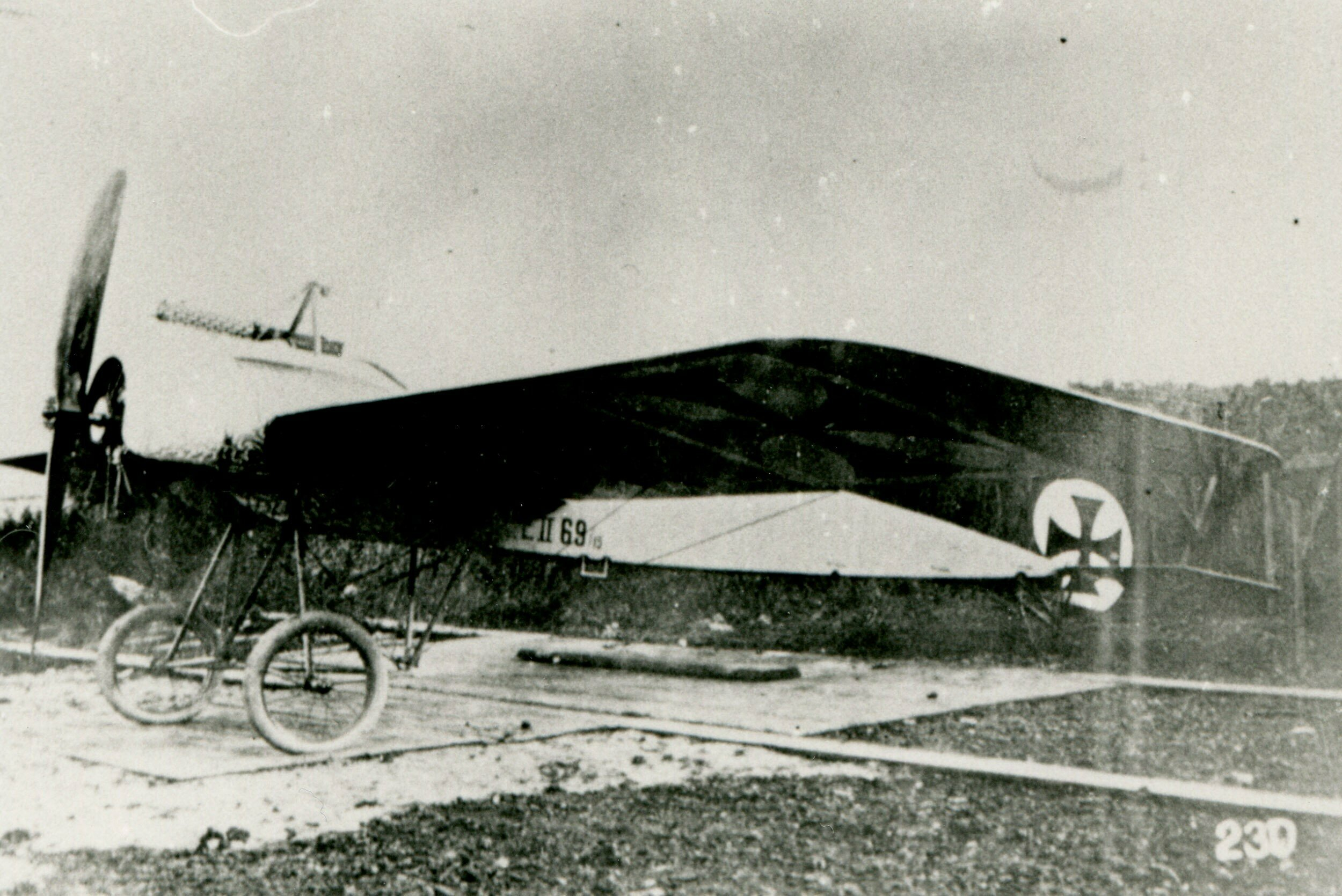

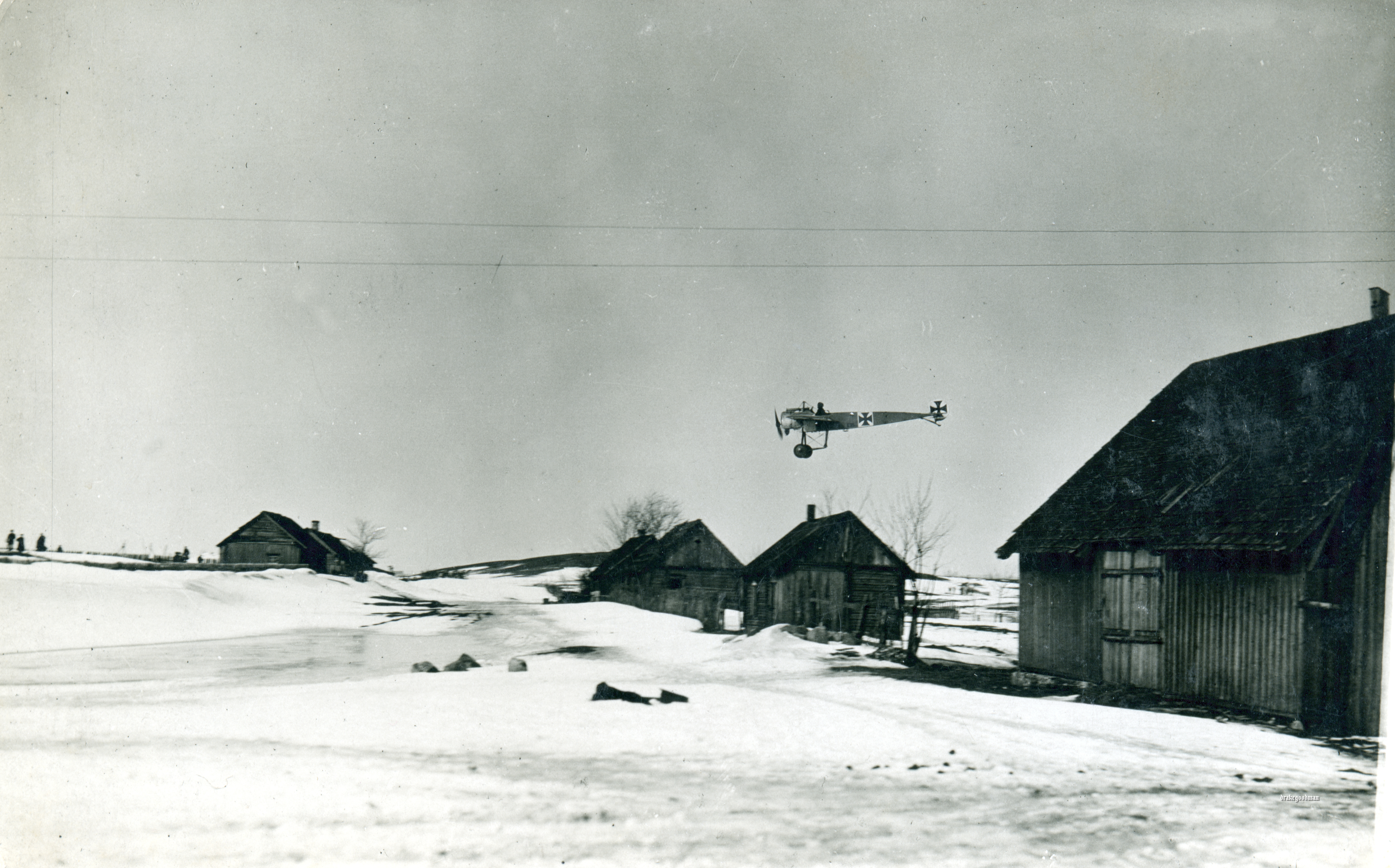
Fokker E.II/35 from Feldflieger Abteilung 14 preparing to land on the Eastern Front.

On 13 June 1915, Anthony Fokker demonstrated the first E.II to an audience of German commanders, including Crown Prince Wilhelm of Germany, at a German Fifth Army airfield. On 23 and 24 June he demonstrated the aircraft at Douai to the German Sixth Army. It was during these demonstrations, only one week before any kills would be achieved in the Eindecker type, that Fokker himself attempted to engage an enemy aircraft but he was unable to find a target.

The major difference between the types was a reduced wingspan on the E.II, intended to increase speed, but handling and climbing performance suffered. The type was therefore quickly superseded by the E.III. The E.II also had a larger fuel capacity of 90 litres (23.75 US gallons) to supply the Oberursel U.I's 54 litres/hour fuel consumption, as compared to the E.I's 69 litres (18.2 US gallons) capacity to feed its earlier U.0 rotary, which used 37 litres/hour of fuel. As with the M.5K/MG quintet of production prototype Eindeckers, the pilot was provided with a head support to help him resist the airstream when he had to raise his head to use the gun sights.

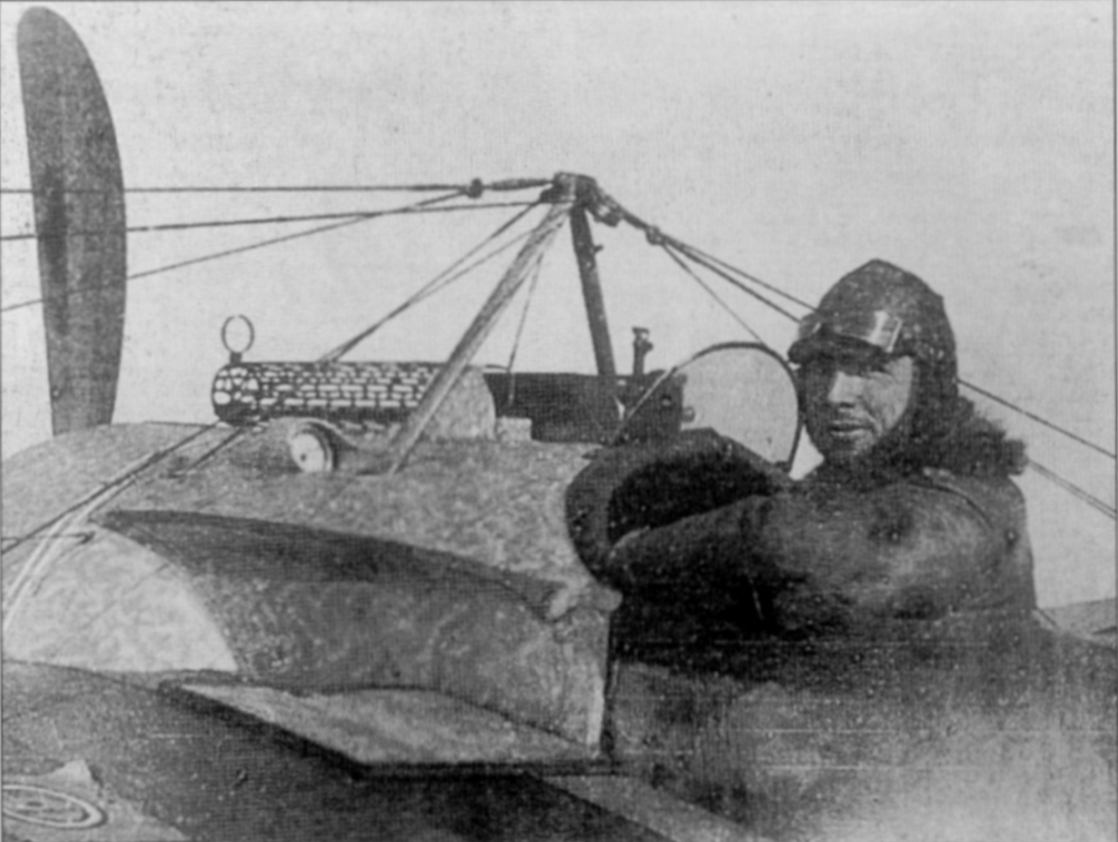
Max Immelmann's Fokker E.II in late October 1915, showing the initial form of soffit surface that the larger Oberursel U.I nine-cylinder rotary engine and larger diameter cowl required.

The heavier weight of the 75 kW (100 hp) Oberursel U.I rotary engine used to power the E.II necessitated both a somewhat lengthened rear fuselage structure, in comparison to the E.I version to achieve proper balance, with the U.I engine's larger diameter requiring a larger radius "horseshoe" pattern cowl to enclose it, and the aluminum upper deck of the nose was raised along with it - resulting in metal soffits having to be fitted where the upper deck met the upper longerons, with additional structural metal tubing additions to the forward ends of the upper longerons immediately behind the firewall to support the "soffits" and sides of the raised upper nose panel. This format was continued with the E.III.

The E.II was built in parallel with the E.I and the choice of whether an airframe became an E.I or E.II depended on the availability of engines. In total, Fokker production figures state that 49 E.IIs were built and 45 of these had been delivered to the Western Front Fliegertruppe by December 1915 (Luftstreitkräfte from October 1916 onwards) at which time production switched to the main Eindecker variant, the Fokker E.III, which used the same 75 kW (100 hp) Oberursel U.I engine. Some E.IIs under production were completed as E.IIIs and numerous E.IIs returned to Fokker's factory for repair were upgraded to E.III specification.

== Operators ==
- German Empire

== Specifications (E.II) ==
General characteristics

- Crew: 1
- Length: 7.2 m (23 ft 7 in)
- Wingspan: 9.7 m (31 ft 10 in)
- Height: 2.8 m (9 ft 2 in)
- Wing area: 16 m^{2} (170 sq ft)
- Empty weight: 340 kg (750 lb)
- Gross weight: 500 kg (1,102 lb)
- Powerplant: 1 × Oberursel U.I 9-cyl. air-cooled rotary engine, 75 kW (101 hp)

Performance

- Maximum speed: 140 km/h (87 mph, 76 kn)

Armament

- Guns: 1 × forward-firing 7.92 mm (.312 in) Maschinengewehr 08 machine gun

== See also ==
Related development Fokker E.I - Fokker E.III Related lists

- List of military aircraft of Germany

== Bibliography ==
- Boyne, Walter J. The Smithsonian Book of Flight for Young People. Washington, DC: Smithsonian Institution, 1988. ISBN 0-689-31422-1.
- Dierikx, Marc. Fokker: A Transatlantic Biography. Washington, DC: Smithsonian Institution Press, 1997. ISBN 1-56098-735-9.
- Grosz, Peter M. Fokker E I/II (Windsock Datafile No. 91). Berkhamsted, Herts, UK: Albatros Publications, 2002. ISBN 1-902207-46-7.
- Jarrett, Philip. "Database: The Fokker Eindeckers". Aeroplane Monthly, December 2004.
- vanWyngarden, Greg. Early German Aces of World War I (Osprey Aircraft of the Aces 73). Botley, Oxfordshire, UK: Osprey, 2006. ISBN 978-1-84176-997-4.
- Winchester, Jim. Fighter: The World's Finest Combat Aircraft - 1913 to the Present Day. New York: Barnes & Noble Publishing, Inc. and Parragon Publishing, 2006. ISBN 0-7607-7957-0.
