= Fokker M.5 =

1913 reconnaissance aircraft model

M.5
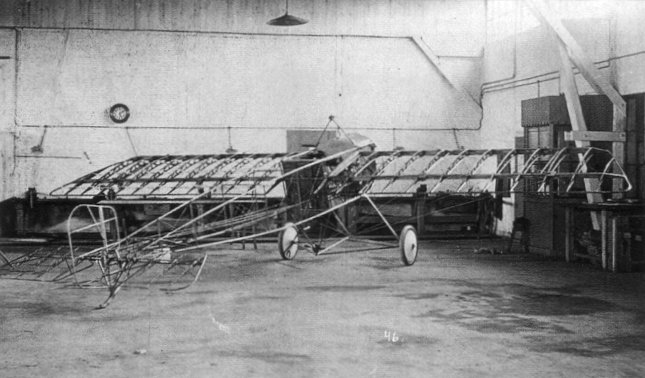
- The prototype – picture probably taken in 1913

General information
- Type: Monoplane
- Manufacturer: Anthony Fokker
- Designer: Anthony Fokker
- Status: Retired

History
- Introduction date: 1913
- Variants: Fokker E.I

The Fokker M.5 was an unarmed single-seat monoplane aircraft designed and built by Anthony Fokker in 1913. It served as a light reconnaissance aircraft with the German army at the outbreak of World War I and was the basis for the first successful fighter aircraft in German service, the Fokker E.I.

== Design ==
Fokker's design for the M.5 was very closely based on that of the French Morane-Saulnier H shoulder-wing monoplane although the fuselage had a welded steel tube frame in place of the wooden structure of the Type H.

The power-plant was a 60 kW (80 hp) Oberursel U.0 7-cylinder rotary engine (Gnome Lambda licence-built by Motorenfabrik Oberursel). As in the Morane original, the tail and elevators were all-moving, having no fixed sections. There were two versions of the M.5: the long-span 'M.5L' and the short-span 'M.5K' ("K" for kurz meaning "short" in German). The M.5 was light, strong and manoeuvrable, capable of aerobatics (although, like all aircraft relying on the early style of Morane balanced elevators, it had very sensitive pitch control). Fokker himself flew the M.5 at Johannisthal in May and June 1914, winning a number of awards.

== German army adoption ==
The German army adopted the militarised long-span M.5L, manufactured by Halberstadt, designated the 'A.II'. A two-seat version, known as the 'M.8' also entered service as the 'A.I' which was built by Fokker. These aircraft were used on the Western and Eastern Fronts in the early stages of the war. In early 1915, 10 M.5Ks were ordered, designated the 'A.III', but before delivery five were modified, being equipped with a single 7.92 mm (.312 in) Parabellum MG14 machine gun, becoming the five Fokker 'M.5K/MG' production prototypes of the Fokker E.I.

== Variants ==
M.5K
(K- Kurz – short) Short span version, retrospectively designated Fokker A.III after entering service with the Imperial German Army as scouting aircraft.
M.5L
(L – Lange – long) Long span version, retrospectively designated Fokker A.I after entering service with the Imperial German Army as scouting aircraft.
M.5K/MG
Five M.5K aircraft armed with a single 7.9 mm (0.311 in) Parabellum MG14 machine gun as the production prototypes of the Fokker E.I
M.6
A tandem two-seat version of the M.5. The sole aircraft was destroyed during testing in a forced landing after pilot-induced engine failure.
M.7
Based closely on the M.5, the M.7 had sesquiplane wings. Twenty M.7s were produced for the Imperial German Navy.
M.8
Production side-by-side two-seater scout entering service as the Fokker A.II.
Fokker A.I
Service designation of the M.5L
Fokker A.II
Service designation of the M.8
Fokker A.III
Service designation of the M.5K
Fokker E.I
The armed production aircraft in service with the Imperial German Army, popularly known as the Fokker Eindekker, responsible for the Fokker Scourge.
W.3 / W.4
An M.7 fitted with floats.

== Operators ==
Austria-Hungary

- Austro-Hungarian Imperial and Royal Aviation Troops
- Austro-Hungarian Navy

German Empire

- Luftstreitkräfte

== Specifications (M.5K) ==
Data from

General characteristics

- Crew: 1
- Length: 7.2 m (23 ft 7 in)
- Wingspan: 9.5 m (31 ft 2 in)
- Powerplant: 1 × Oberursel U.0 7-cylinder rotary piston engine, 60 kW (80 hp)
- Propellers: 2-bladed wooden fixed pitch propeller

Performance

- Maximum speed: 130 km/h (81 mph, 70 kn)
- Service ceiling: 3,000 m (9,800 ft)

== See also ==
Related development

- Fokker E.I

Aircraft of comparable role, configuration, and era

- Morane-Saulnier H

== Bibliography ==
- Herris, Jack (2020). Fokker Aircraft of WWI: Volume 1: Spinne–M.10 & Watercraft: A Centennial Perspective on Great War Airplanes. Great War Aviation Centennial Series. Vol. 51. n.p.: Aeronaut Books. ISBN 978-1-953201-05-8.
- Leaman, Paul (2001). Fokker Aircraft of World War One. Marlborough, UK: Crowood Press. ISBN 1-86126-353-8.
