= Motorenfabrik Oberursel =

German engine manufacturer (1892–1930)

Coordinates: 50°12′41″N 8°33′55″E

Motorenfabrik Oberursel A.G. was a German manufacturer of automobile, locomotive and aircraft engines situated in Oberursel (Taunus), near Frankfurt (Main), Germany. During World War I it supplied a major 100 hp-class rotary engine that was used in a number of early-war fighter aircraft designs. In 1921 the company merged with Deutz AG, and then again in 1930 with Humboldt-Deutz Motoren, and finally in 1938 with Klöcknerwerke AG. From this point on they were known as the Klöckner-Humboldt-Deutz Oberursel factory, known primarily for their locomotive engines. Today they are part of Rolls-Royce Deutschland, and produce one family of their jet engines.

The factory in Oberursel is claimed to be the oldest surviving aircraft engine factory in the world.

== Early years ==
The company had its origins in 1891, when Willy Seck invented a new gasoline fuel injection system and produced a small one-cylinder stationary engine of about 4 hp, which he called the Gnom. The following year he founded Willy Seck & Co. to sell the design, which became famous around the world. The engine was improved to achieve more power, but in 1897 the shareholders refused to allow Seck to develop a Gnom-powered car and he left the company. The company was reorganized as Motorenfabrik Oberursel the next year, and by 1900 had built 2,000 engines.

The same year the company granted a license to the Seguin brothers in Lyon to produce the Gnom in France. Sold under the French name Gnome, the engine became so successful that they renamed their company to the same name. In 1908 they developed a rotary version of the basic Gnome system as the Gnome Omega aircraft engine, and from there a series of larger versions of the same basic design. The new Gnome engines were wildly successful, powering many of the early record breaking aircraft.

In 1913 Motorenfabrik Oberursel took out a license on the French Gnome engine design and the similar Le Rhône 9C. They produced both, the Gnomes as the U-series, and the Le Rhônes as the UR-series.

The Gnome Lambda seven-cylinder 80 hp rotary engine was also produced by the Oberursel firm as the Oberursel U.0 Umlaufmotor (the generic German term for a rotary engine) as their first-ever powerplant for German military aircraft, and was used on the initial versions of the famous Fokker Eindecker fighter, the Fokker E.I.

== World War I ==
When World War I started the following year the Oberursel U.I of 100 hp, a licensed copy of the Gnome Delta 100 hp (75 kW) rotary, had the best power-to-weight ratio of any German engine. It went on to power most of the early German fighters, such as the Fokker and Pfalz E-series monoplanes.

Oberursel also built a licensed copy of Gnome's 14-cylinder Double Lambda two-row rotary. This 160 hp (120 kW) engine, designated U.III in Germany, was difficult to build and quickly wore out in service. It was used on the Fokker E.IV and D.III designs.

The 110 hp Oberursel UR.II, the licensed copy of the Le Rhône 9J of the same power output, was the next major success. Fokker bought the company in 1916 in order to guarantee supplies of the UR.II. This acquisition proved advantageous because Fokker was partial to rotary powered designs, and because supplies of the Mercedes D.III engine were limited. The UR.II was used in the Fokker Dr.I and Fokker D.VI.

By 1917, the UR.II had been rendered obsolete by its relatively low power and poor performance at altitude. An 11-cylinder development, the UR.III, was not used operationally. Indeed, by 1918, rotary engines had largely fallen from favor with the Idflieg and with pilots. The lack of castor oil and the poor quality of the mineral oil substitute "Voltol" severely reduced engine life and reliability. Nevertheless, in the summer of 1918, the UR.II was installed in the Fokker D.VIII. The light weight and aerodynamic cleanliness of the D.VIII allowed it to achieve excellent performance even with the outdated UR.II.

After the war the company was purchased in 1921 by Gasmotorenfabrik Deutz, another gasoline engine manufacturer, who moved their two-stroke diesel manufacturing to the Oberursel factories. In 1930 they merged with Humboldt-Deutz, but with only one product line. The factory was eventually closed in 1932 during the Great Depression, reopening in 1934 for small-scale production.

== World War II ==
In 1940 during World War II all diesel research was relocated to Oberursel, where Dr. Ing. Adolf Schnürle led the development of much larger and more advanced engines for aircraft use. This led to the Klöckner-Humboldt-Deutz DZ 700 8-cylinder radial engine, the DZ 710 16-cylinder boxer engine, and the DZ 720 32-cylinder H-block made from twinned 710's. The firm was also responsible for manufacturing the largest number (at some 12,500 units) of the German Wehrmacht military's Raupenschlepper Ost fully tracked artillery tractor design. None of the firm's engine designs reached operational use by the end of the war, when the factory was occupied by US troops.

== Post-World War II ==
For a short period in 1946 the factories were used as a tanks and trucks repair depot by the US army.

In 1956 the factories were returned to Klöckner-Humboldt-Deutz, and from then on have been used primarily for gas turbine development and production. For the next twenty years they produced a variety of designs, typically under license from other companies. In 1980 they were renamed KHD Luftfahrttechnik GmbH.

In 1990 the company was sold to what was then BMW Rolls-Royce. The new owners decided to use the Oberursel plants to produce an entirely modern engine for the "small end" of the aviation market, and started development of the Rolls-Royce BR700 family in 1991. The engines have since gone on to power a number of aircraft including Bombardier, Gulfstream V and the Boeing 717.

== Engines ==
Oberursel U.0
licensed Gnome 7 Lambda, 68/80 hp (51/59 kW) seven cylinder rotary.
Oberursel U.I
100 hp (75 kW), nine cylinder, and total displacement to 16.3 litres (990 cu in) 124 mm × 150 mm (4.9 in × 5.9 in)::
Oberursel U.III
Gnome Double Lambda 14-cylinder, two-row rotary engine copy, 160 hp (120 kW) and total displacement to 23.67 litres (1,444 cu in) with 140 mm (5.5 in) stroke.
Oberursel Ur.II
Clone of the Le Rhone 9J 110 hp (82 kW) nine cylinder rotary.
Oberursel Ur.III
11-cylinder development of the Ur.II. 145 hp (108 kW) and total displacement to 18.42 litres (1,124 cu in)
Oberursel 200 hp 18-cyl rotary
124 mm × 150 mm (4.9 in × 5.9 in)
Oberursel 240 hp V-8
