= Otto Parschau =

German World War I flying ace (1890-1916)

- Photo of Leutnant Otto Parschau just after earning the Pour le Mérite
- Born: 11 November 1890; Klutznick, Allenstein, East Prussia
- Died: 21 July 1916 (aged 25); Grévillers, France
- Military career
- Allegiance: German Empire
- Branch: Luftstreitkräfte
- Service years: 1910-1916
- Rank: Leutnant
- Units: Flieger-Abteilung (Artillerie) 42; Flieger-Abteilung (Artillerie) 261; Flieger-Abteilung 32
- Commands: Abwehrkommando Nord
- Awards: Pour le Mérite; Royal House Order of Hohenzollern; Iron Cross 1st Class

Leutnant Otto Parschau (11 November 1890 – 21 July 1916) was a German World War I flying ace and recipient of the Pour le Mérite, Royal House Order of Hohenzollern, and Iron Cross, First Class. He was noted as one of the pre-eminent aces on the Fokker Eindecker. He was one of the world's first flying aces. Parschau and Leutnant Kurt Wintgens were the pilots chosen to fly the prototype of the revolutionary Fokker Eindecker fighter plane with a machine gun synchronized to fire safely through its propeller arc via use of a gun synchronizer.

== Background ==
Parschau was born in Klausen (now Klutznick, Poland), in the Allenstein district of East Prussia. He became a commissioned officer a year after having joined the Infanterie-Regiment Nr. 151 in 1910. Parschau was trained as a pilot in Johannisthal, Darmstadt, and in Hanover and received his licence on 4 July 1913.

== World War I ==
Upon the outbreak of hostilities in August 1914 Parschau was already serving with the Luftstreitkräfte, and soon found himself flying two-seaters in operations on the Champagne front and then in Flanders and Alsace-Lorraine before being posted to West Prussia and Galicia, on the Eastern Front.

=== The Green Machine (A.16/15) ===
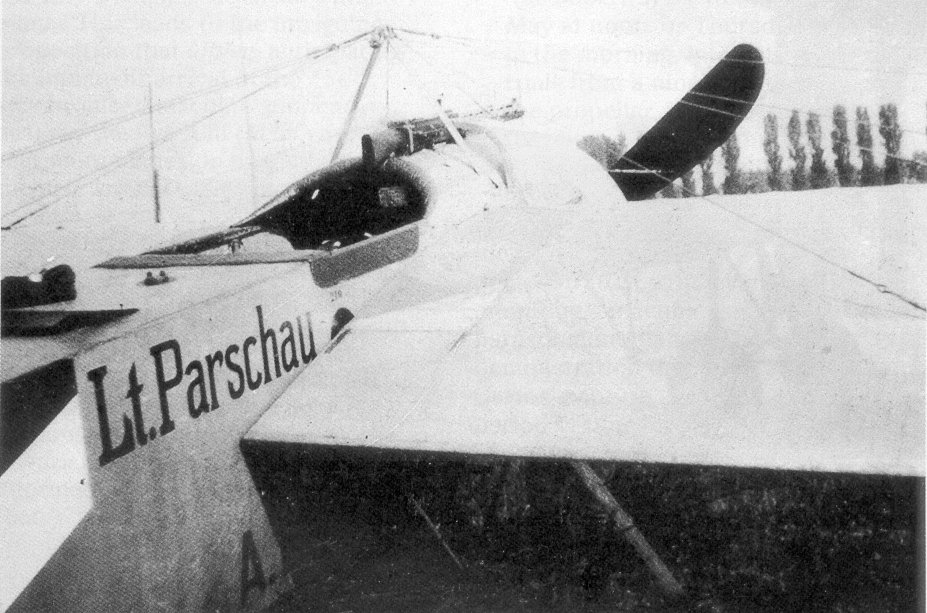
Close-up photo of Otto Parschau's "green machine", armed with a synchronized Parabellum MG14 machine gun in May 1915, essentially the Fokker Eindecker "prototype".

Parschau was assigned the Fokker A.III aircraft bearing both the Fokker factory serial number 216 and the IdFlieg military serial number of A.16/15. This airplane had previously been flown by Oberleutnant Waldemar von Buttlar. This unarmed monoplane had been privately purchased in 1913 by von Buttlar. It was requisitioned by the Fliegertruppe and von Buttlar was commissioned as an officer in the German Army at the outbreak of hostilities. The airplane was painted in a shade of green that was the same as that used by von Buttlar's previous Marburg-based Jäger Regiment 11. Parschau had served with the same, Brieftauben-Abteilung Ostende unit, abbreviated as BAO in German military communications of the time, in Belgium as Oberleutnant von Buttlar did in November 1914, where the two German officers could have first made contact. As A.16/15 still bore the green color of von Buttlar's old unit, the aircraft became distinctive as Parschau's 'Green Machine', right from the outbreak of World War I. Parschau flew this machine on a roving commission for nearly a year, serving with FFAs 22 and 42 and the aforementioned "BAO" unit, which was actually a group of four FFA units operating as one for the Oberste Heeresleitung (OHL), the World War I German Army's High Command office. In this period, Parschau flew his distinctive machine on the Champagne front during October and November 1914. Following this were periods in Flanders and Alsace-Lorraine before Parschau was posted first to West Prussia and then on to Galicia on the Eastern Front. His travels were marked on the Fokker's fuselage. In late May 1915, this airplane was the first one to be fitted with a workable synchronization gear: the Fokker Stangensteuerung synchronizer, along with a Parabellum MG 14 machine gun for its armament. This airplane functioned as the prototype Fokker Eindecker for Parschau's use and combat evaluation.

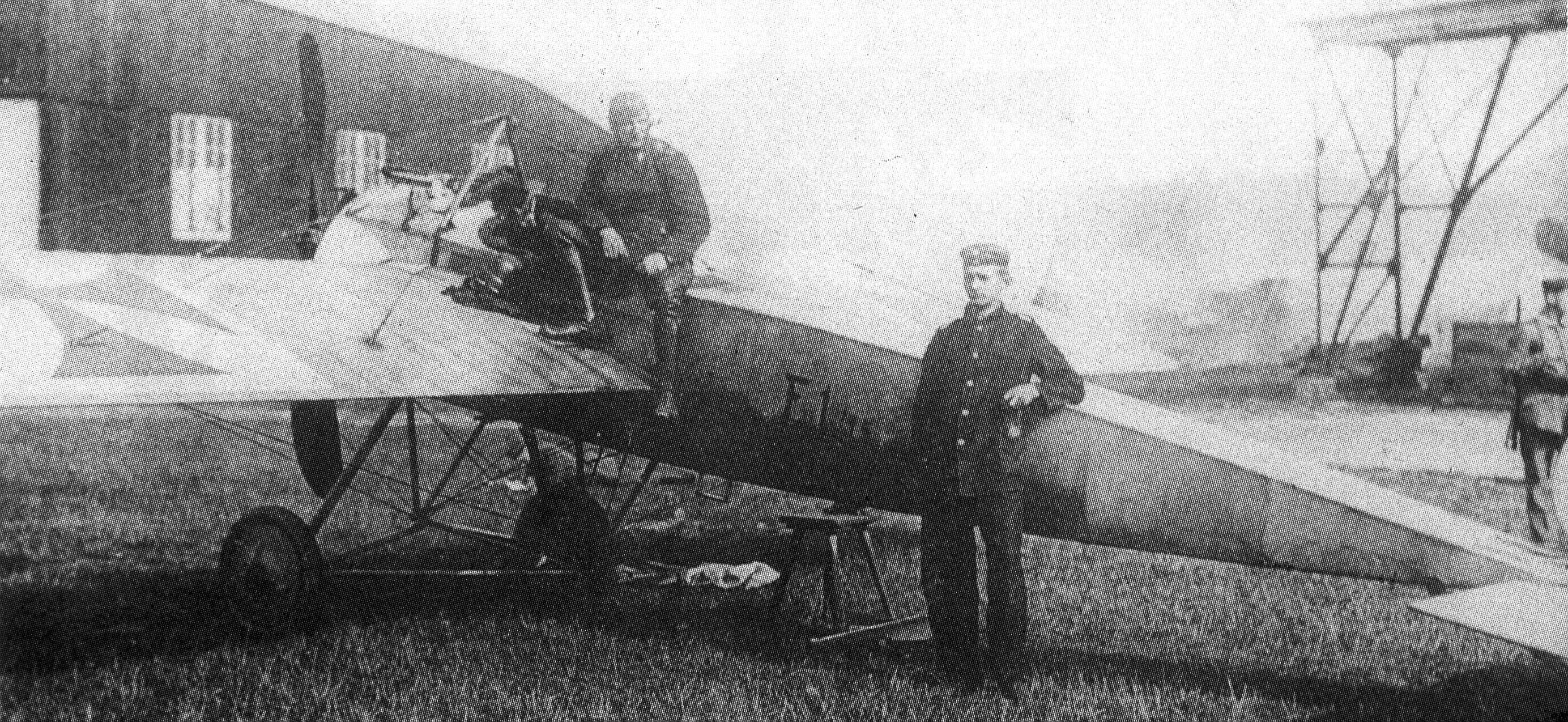
Otto Parschau's Fokker M.5K/MG (Fokker factory no. "191") with IdFlieg serial E.1/15, the very first series-built Fokker Eindecker ever produced, shown with "lowered" wing mount location.

=== Later war service ===
Because Parschau was recognised as an experienced and proficient pilot, he was selected to go to Feldflieger Abteilung 62 (FFA 62) at Douai as an instructor on monoplanes. Feldflieger Abteilung ("Field Flying Company") was the title of the pioneering German field aviation units. The FFAs were organized under the Fliegertruppe. By October 1916, the Fliegertruppe had evolved into the Luftstreitkräfte, the air service of the German army. (The German navy had their own air service, the Marine-Fliegerabteilung.) Amongst Parschau's students at FFA 62 were the notable pioneer German flying aces, Max Immelmann and Oswald Boelcke. Despite his earlier complaints of his Parabellum machine gun jamming, he managed to reel off a string of six victories over enemy airplanes between 11 October 1915 and 2 July 1916 as part of the Fokker Scourge. On 3 July 1916, he shot down an enemy observation balloon. In July 1916 he transferred to FFA 32, gaining his 8th victory on 9 July 1916. He was awarded the Pour le Merite the following day. On the 14th, AKN was severed from FFA 32 and Parschau was appointed to its command.

On 21 July 1916 Parschau was mortally wounded during combat with Royal Flying Corps aircraft over Grévillers. The fatal wound was to the chest; he also suffered a glancing bullet wound to the head, possibly from rounds fired by John Oliver Andrews. He retained enough control to land his plane behind German lines. He was rushed to a field hospital but died on the operating table.

== Notes ==
=== References ===
- van Wyngarden, G. Early German Aces of World War 1. Oxford: Osprey Publishing, 2006. ISBN 1-84176-997-5.
- Grosz, Peter M., Windsock Datafile No. 91, Fokker E.I/II, Albatros Publications, Ltd. 2002. ISBN No. 1-902207-46-7.
- Franks, Norman; Bailey, Frank W.; Guest, Russell (1993), Above the Lines: The Aces and Fighter Units of the German Air Service, Naval Air Service and Flanders Marine Corps 1914 - 1918 Grub Street, 1993. ISBN 0-948817-73-9.
