= 1913 in aviation =

This is a list of aviation-related events from 1913:

== Events ==
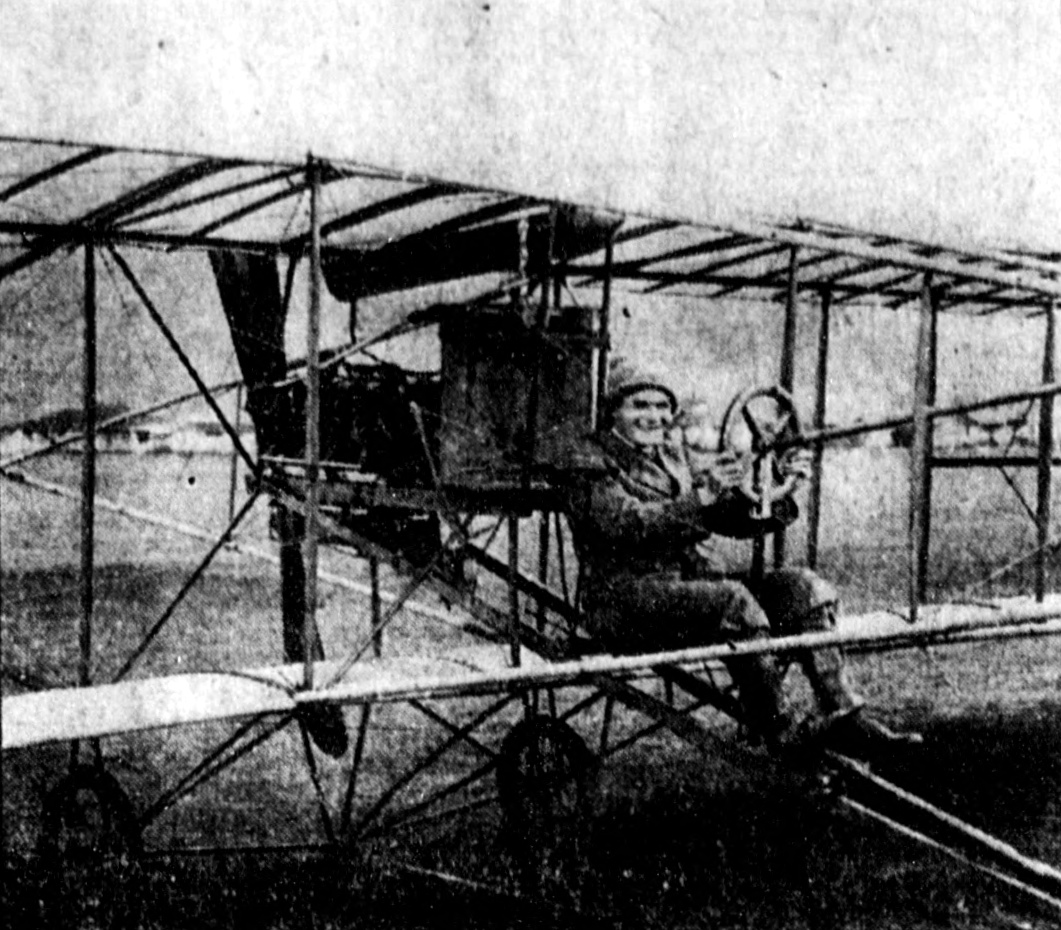
Didier Masson, 1913

- The Serbian air force is established as an army air service. Six officers receive pilot training in France.
- Mexican pilot Gustavo Salinas Camilla and Frenchman Didier Masson, flying for rebel forces led by Pancho Villa during the Mexican Revolution, attack Mexican federal ground and naval forces.
- The Imperial Japanese Navy places its first aviation ship, the naval auxiliary Wakamiya, in service to operate naval floatplanes.
- The Imperial Russian Navy experiments with shipboard airplane operations for the first time, embarking a Curtiss floatplane aboard the protected cruiser Kagul in the Black Sea. It is its only such experiment prior to World War I.
- The Royal Swedish Navy acquires its first seaplane.
- In the United Kingdom, a Sopwith Type C floatplane succeeds in lifting a 14-inch (356-mm), 900-lb (408-kg) torpedo into the air.
- Short Brothers patents the first folding wing mechanism.
- Pierre Levasseur's manufacturing firm, Société Pierre Levasseur Aéronautique, which previously made propellers, begins to manufacture aircraft.
- Franco-British Aviation (FBA) is founded. The company is headquartered in London, and its French subsidiary operates its manufacturing facilities in Argenteuil, France.

=== January–June ===
- 8 February – Russian pilot N. de Sackoff becomes the first pilot shot down in combat when his biplane is hit by ground fire following a bombing run on the walls of Fort Bezhani during the First Balkan War. Flying for Greece, he comes down near Preveza, on the coast north of the Ionian island of Lefkada, secures local Greek assistance, repairs his airplane, and flies back to base.
- 11 February – The Chilean Army establishes a Military Aviation School at Lo Espejo (now El Bosque).
- 13 February – The Kingdom of Serbia adopts regulations governing the operation of aircraft, making it the fifth country to do so after Germany, the United Kingdom, France, and Austria-Hungary.
- 28 February – A Royal Decree of the Kingdom of Spain establishes the Aeronáutica Militar, the aviation service of the Spanish Army.
- March – The Republic of China obtains twelve military aircraft from France.
- 15 March – The United States Army forms the 1st Aero Squadron under Capt Charles Chandler at Texas City to scout for Mexican incursions along the border.
- 1 April – The Romanian Military Aeronautics Service is established. Will become the Romanian Air Corps in 1915.
- April – Austro-Hungarian Navy battleships transport flying boats from Pola to the Gulf of Cattaro as part of an international peacekeeping force sent to the region toward the end of the First Balkan War.
- 16 April – The inaugural 1913 Schneider Trophy race is won by Maurice Prévost in a Deperdussin monoplane, who completes 28 circuits of the 10 km (6.2 mi) course with an average speed of 73.63 km/h (45.75 mph).
- 24 April – The French aviator Eugene Gilbert makes a record non-stop cross-country flight of 826 km (523 miles), flying from Villacoublay, France, to Vitoria-Gasteiz, Spain. The flight takes 8 hours 23 minutes.
- 27 April – Flying a Gage biplane, Robert G. Fowler makes the first nonstop flight across the Isthmus of Panama, covering 83 km (52 miles) in 1 hour 45 minutes Technically, this is the first nonstop flight across North America from the Atlantic to the Pacific.
- 7 May – HMS Hermes, formerly a protected cruiser, recommissions as the Royal Navy's first experimental seaplane carrier.
- 13 May – The Cuban aviator Domingo Rosillo makes the first flight across the Florida Strait, flying 90 miles (145 km) from Key West, Florida, to Havana, Cuba, in 2 hours 8 minutes in a Morane-Saulnier monoplane, aided by a naval escort to ensure that he keeps on course.
- 15 May – Cuban-born pilot Austin Parlá flies across the Florida Strait without surface support, relying only on a compass, the first person to do so.
- 26 May (13 May O.S.) – Igor Sikorsky flies the world's first four-engine fixed-wing aircraft as he takes his Bolshoi Baltisky biplane (original version of the Russky Vityaz) Ilya Mourometz into the sky for the Imperial Russian Air Service near Saint Petersburg (following test hops flown since three days earlier). Powered by 220 horsepower (164 kW) engines, the bomber can carry up to 700 kilograms (1,543 lb) of bombs and has room for four machine guns and a crew of five. It is also the first plane fitted with a lavatory.
- 9 June – A German Zeppelin flies from Baden-Baden, Germany, to Vienna, Austria-Hungary, in only half the time required by the fastest train.
- 21 June – Over Los Angeles, California, Georgia "Tiny" Broadwick becomes the first woman to parachute from an airplane. Dropping from an altitude of 2,000 feet (610 m) from a trapeze-like swing mounted under the airplane behind its wing, she lands safely in Griffith Park. The airplane's pilot is Glenn L. Martin.

=== July–December ===
- 1 July – The Royal Netherlands Army forms its Aviation Division (Luchtvaart Afdeling)
- 5 July – A seaplane carrier participates in the British Royal Navy's annual maneuvers for the first time, as HMS Hermes embarks two seaplanes, the Short Folder S.64 biplane and a Caudron G.3 amphibian. The Short aircraft is the first with folding wings to be used aboard a ship. The maneuvers, which conclude on October 6, demonstrate both the feasibility of extended operations by aircraft at sea and the value of folding wings.
- 17 July – The Royal Navy introduces the term "seaplane"; previously, seaplanes had been known as "hydro-aeroplanes." The term "seaplane" comes into general use during the year.
- 28 July – A Caudron G.3 amphibian takes off from a platform aboard the Hermes while she is underway and lands at Great Yarmouth. It is the first time an aircraft launches from the deck of a ship and lands ashore.
- 7 August – American-born aviation pioneer Samuel Franklin Cody is killed with his passenger (English cricketer William Evans) when his Cody Floatplane breaks up in flight over Hampshire in England.
- 20 August – The French aviator Adolphe Pegoud becomes the first person in Europe to jump from an airplane and land safely when he parachutes from 700 feet (213 m) above Buc, Yvelines, France.
- 1 September – Adolphe Pégoud makes the first inverted flight, flying upside down for 0.4 km (0.25 mile).
- 3 September – During the Imperial German Navy′s autumn 1913 maneuvers, an Avro 503 flown by Leutnant W. Langfeld becomes the first airplane to fly the 40 miles across the North Sea from Wilhelmshaven to Heligoland. It flies back to the German mainland on 15 September, landing at Cuxhaven.
- 9 September
  - Imperial Russian Army pilot Pyotr Nesterov becomes the first person to loop an airplane, flying a Nieuport IV monoplane over Syretzk Aerodrome near Kiev.
  - Maurice Prevost reaches 204 km/h (127 mph) in a Deperdussin racing aeroplane.
  - Helgoland Island air disaster: The first fatalities aboard a German airship occur when the Imperial German Navy Zeppelin dirigible LZ 14 (naval designation L 1) is forced down into the North Sea off Heligoland during a thunderstorm, killing 16 of the 22 men on board. Among the dead are the commanding officer of the Naval Airship Division, Kapitänleutnant Matzing.
- 13 September – Aurel Vlaicu, Romanian engineer and inventor, dies near Câmpina, Romania, while attempting to fly across the Carpathian Mountains in his Vlaicu II airplane.
- 20 September – The second annual Aerial Derby takes place, sponsored by the Daily Mail newspaper. Nine participants fly a single circuit of a 94-mile (151-kilometer) course, starting and finishing at Hendon Aerodrome in London, with control points at Kempton Park, Esher, Purley, and Purfleet. Gustav Hamel is the overall winner in a Morane-Saulnier airplane with a time of 1 hour 15 minutes 49 seconds and receives a gold trophy and £200 prize. Shell awards prizes of £100, £70, and £50 for the handicap competition, which Bentfield Hucks wins in a Blériot airplane.
- 21 September – Adolphe Pégoud loops a Blériot XI over France, believing it to be the first loop in history. The feat is widely publicized as the world's first loop until word of Pyotr Nesterov's loop over Russia of 12 days before spreads.
- 23 September – Roland Garros makes the first flight across the Mediterranean Sea, 729 km (453 mi) from Saint-Raphaël, Var, France, to Bizerte, Tunisia, in 7 hours 53 minutes.
- October – The Imperial Japanese Navy includes an aviation ship, the naval auxiliary Wakamiya, in its annual naval exercises for the first time. Wakamiya operates one or two Farman floatplanes during the exercise, which lasts into November.
- 17 October – Johannisthal Air Disaster: Imperial German Navy Zeppelin LZ 18 (naval designation L 2) burns in mid-air near Johannisthal Air Field in Germany and crashes, killing all 28 on board.
- November
  - The first air-to-air combat in history takes place over Mexico when aircraft exchange pistol shots during the Mexican Revolution, apparently scoring no hits.
  - The second Cody V biplane, having flown for around 2 1/2 hours only between January and March, is presented to the Science Museum in London.
- 29 November
  - Raymonde de Laroche flies 200 miles (322 km) solo in four hours to win her the 1913 Fémina Cup for the longest solo flight by a woman that year.
  - Flying a Nieuport monoplane, Emmanuel Helen completes a winning performance in competition for the 1913 International Michelin Cup, awarded for the greatest distance flown during 1913 on a series of consecutive days, flying over a 100 km (62.1 mi) course, with a compulsory landing after each circuit. Since 22 October, he has covered a total distance of 16,096.6 km (10,002.0 mi) in qualifying flights.
- December
- The United States Army makes its 1st Aero Squadron, previously a provisional organization, into its first official aviation squadron.
- 13–14 December – German balloonist Hugo Kaulen stays aloft for 87 hours. This record lasts until 1935.

== First flights ==
- Avro 511 (probable first flight)
- FBA Type A, prototype of the FBA Type A, FBA Type B, and FBA Type C
- Caudron Type G
- Caudron Type J
- Caudron Type K
- Nieuport-Macchi Parasol
- ca. 1913 – Caudron Type L
- early 1913 – Caudron Type F
- autumn 1913 – Grigorovich M-1
- late 1913 – Caudron G.2
- late 1913 – Caudron G.3

=== January ===
- Avro 501

=== May ===
- 26 May – Sikorsky Russky Vityaz (see Events above)

=== August ===
- 12 August – Bristol T.B.8

=== September ===
- 18 September – Avro 504

=== November ===
- Sopwith Tabloid

=== December ===
- 11 December – Sikorsky Ilya Muromets
