= Gnome Monosoupape =

Type of aircraft rotary engine

Monosoupape
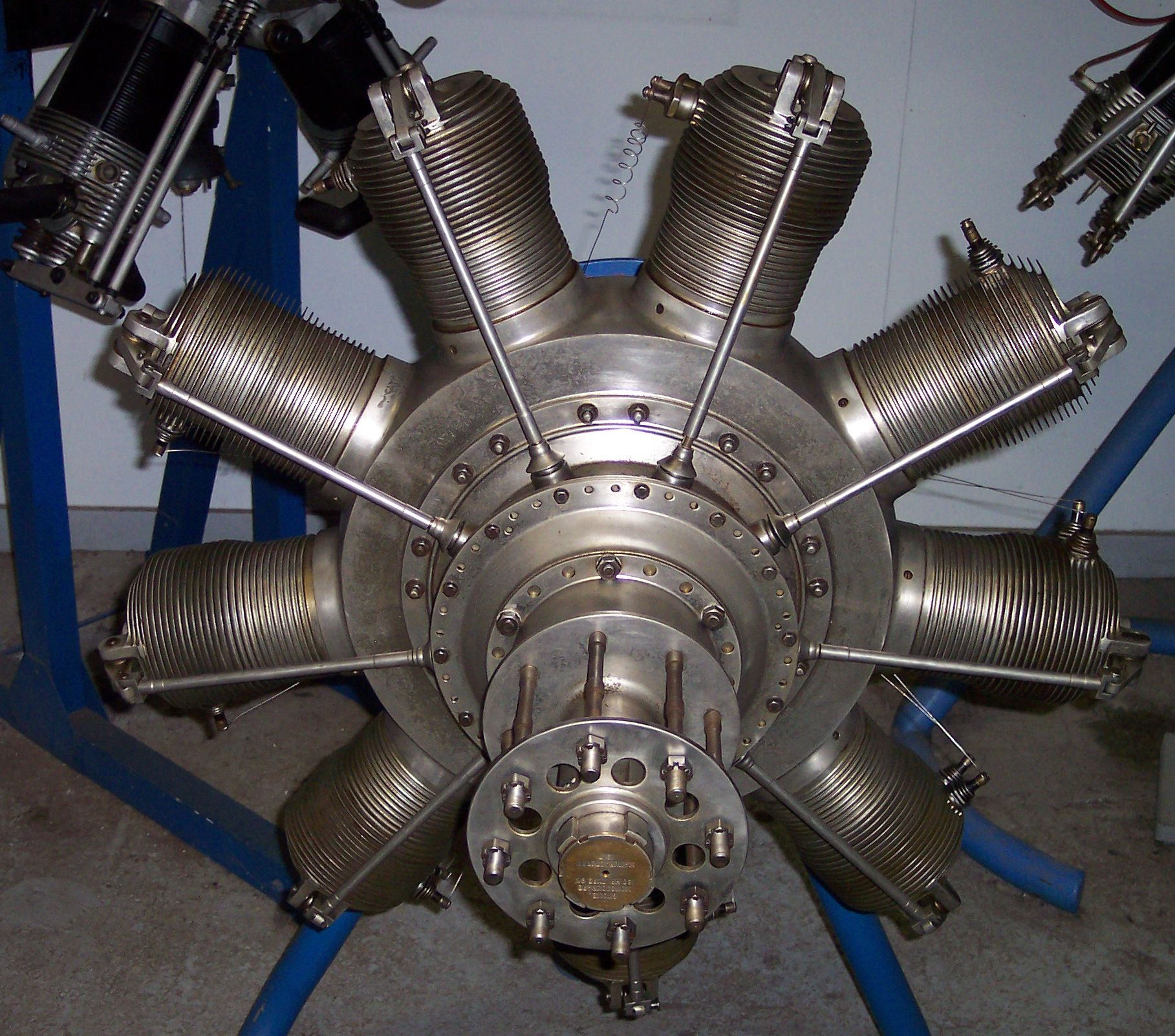
- A 1917 Gnome 9N 160 hp Monosoupape rotary engine, with dual ignition provision. Diameter is 95cm (37.4 in)
- Type: Rotary aero engine
- National origin: France
- Manufacturer: Gnome et Rhône
- First run: 1913
- Major applications: Airco DH.2; Nieuport 28

The Monosoupape (French for single-valve), is a rotary engine design first introduced in 1913 by the Gnome Engine Company (renamed Gnome et Rhône in 1915). It uses an arrangement of internal transfer ports to replace the automatic centre-piston inlet valve found on earlier Gnome engines. The elimination of the inlet valve removed a common source of engine failure but also resulted in increased fuel consumption.

French aircraft manufacturers ordered relatively few Monosoupape engines preferring other types including Gnome et Rhône's own Le Rhône series. 2,188 Monosoupape engines were manufactured in Britain, with additional licensed production taking place in Italy and the United States.

British aircraft designer Thomas Sopwith described the Monosoupape as "one of the greatest single advances in aviation". However the type was also criticised for its poor reliability with Royal Flying Corps commander Hugh Trenchard describing it as a "beast of an engine".

== Background ==
Early Gnome rotary engines like the Gnome Omega, Lambda and Delta used an arrangement of valves in order to eliminate pushrods that operated during the inlet phase of the combustion cycle on more conventional engines. Instead, a single exhaust valve on the cylinder head was operated by a pushrod that opened the valve when the pressure dropped at the end of the power stroke. A pressure-operated inlet valve, which was balanced by a counterweight to equalize the centrifugal forces, was placed in the centre of the piston crown, where it opened to allow the fuel–air charge to enter from the engine's central crankcase.

The use of automatic intake valves in the piston crown had several drawbacks. The engine's volumetric efficiency was low because the inlet valve opened later and closed sooner than the ideal timing that could have been achieved with actuated valves. The inlet valves were also a source of poor reliability and high maintenance, as they easily became unbalanced and gummed up. The valves also performed poorly at higher altitudes.

== Design ==
In 1913, the Gnome motor company introduced the new Monosoupape series, which eliminated the troublesome inlet valve, replacing it with piston-controlled transfer ports similar to those found in a two-stroke engine. Beginning with the power stroke, the four-stroke engine operated normally until the piston had traveled half way to the bottom of its stroke (bottom dead center, or BDC), when the exhaust valve was opened "early". This let the still-hot burnt combustion gases "pop" out of the engine while the piston was still moving down, relieving exhaust pressure and preventing exhaust gases from entering the crankcase. After a small additional amount of travel, the piston uncovered 36 small ports around the base of the cylinder, leading to the crankcase which held additional fuel–air mixture (the charge). No transfer took place at this point since there was no pressure differential; the cylinder was still open to the air and thus at ambient pressure. The overhead valve exhausted directly into the slipstream since no exhaust manifold could be practically fitted to the spinning crankcase and cylinders.

During the exhaust stroke, scavenging occurred as the air moving past the cylinder exterior lowered the pressure inside due to the direct exposure of the exhaust port to the slipstream. The piston continued its exhaust stroke until top dead center (TDC) was reached, but the valve remained open. The piston began to move down on its intake stroke with the valve still open, pulling new air into the cylinder. It remained open until it was three quarters of the way down, at which point the valve closed and the remainder of the intake stroke greatly reduced the air pressure. When the piston uncovered the transfer ports again, the low pressure in the cylinder drew in the balance of the charge.

The charge was an overly rich fuel-air mixture, which was acquired through the hollow crankshaft. Air entered through scoops at the back of the crankshaft. Fuel was continuously injected by a fuel nozzle on the end of a fuel line, also entering the crankcase through the hollow crankshaft. The nozzle was in the proximity of, and aimed at, the inside base of the cylinder where the transfer ports were located. The fuel nozzle was stationary with the crankshaft, and the cylinders rotated into position in turn. The compression stroke was conventional.

The spark plug was installed horizontally into the rear of the cylinder at the top but had no connecting high-voltage wire. An internal-tooth ring gear mounted on the engine drove a stationary magneto mounted on the firewall, whose high-voltage output terminal was in close proximity to the spark plug terminals as they passed by. This arrangement eliminated the need for distributor and high-voltage wiring found in conventional mechanically timed ignition systems. This ring gear also drove the oil pump, which supplied oil to all bearings, and through hollow pushrods to the rockers and valves. The ring gear could also be used to drive a petrol pump or and air compressor to pressurize the fuel tank. The later 160 hp (120 kW) Gnome 9N model had an ignition system with two spark plugs per cylinder and two magnetos.

=== Control ===
Monosoupapes had a single petrol regulating control used for a limited degree of speed regulation. In early examples, engine speed could be controlled by varying the opening time and extent of the exhaust valves using levers acting on the valve tappet rollers, but this was later abandoned due to causing burning of the valves. Instead, a "blip", also known as a "coupe", switch was used, which cut out the ignition when pressed. This was used sparingly to avoid fouling the spark plugs, since it was only safe to be used when the fuel supply was also cut. The later 160 hp (120 kW) output 9N subtype also featured an unusual method of functioning with its integral dual-ignition setup, that allowed output values of one-half, one-quarter and one-eighth power levels to be achieved through use of the coupe-switch and a special five-position rotary switch that selected which of the trio of alternate power levels would be selected when the coupe-switch was depressed, allowing it to cut out all spark voltage to all nine cylinders, at evenly spaced intervals to achieve the multiple levels of power reduction. (Note: In order to keep the engine running smoothly on reduced power settings, it was necessary for the selector switch to cut out all cylinders at evenly spaced intervals. It was also beneficial to have all cylinders firing periodically to keep them warm and to prevent the spark plugs from fouling with oil. The selector switch has five positions, zero for off and four running positions, one through four. The Gnôme 9N had two magnetos (and two spark plugs per cylinder) and the selector switch was wired to the right magneto only, so it was necessary for the pilot to turn off the left magneto if he wanted to change the speed of the engine.)

=== Lubrication ===
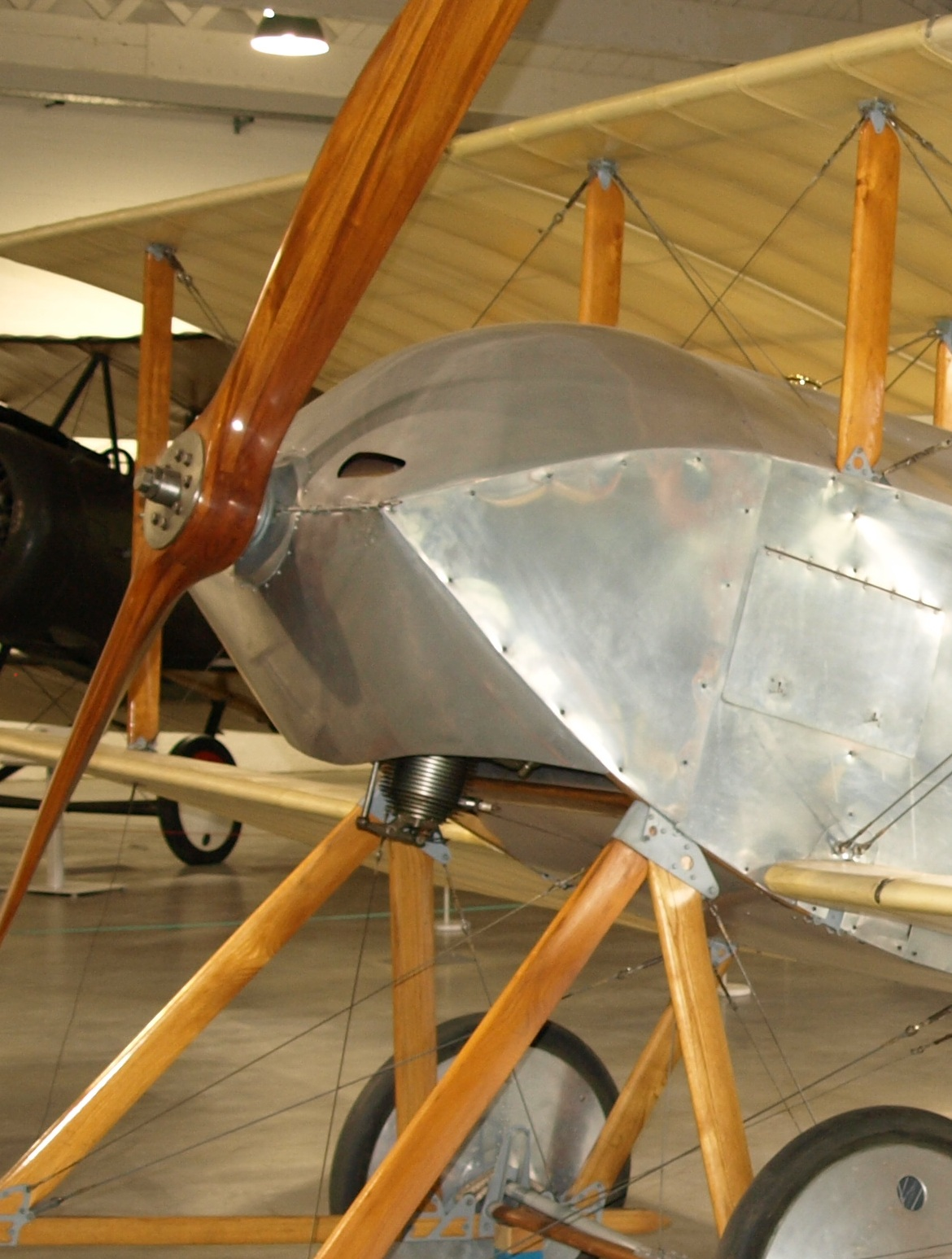
The Sopwith Tabloid reproduction shows the sheet-metal cowling used to redirect the oil sprayed by the rotating engine.

The lubrication system, as with all rotary engines, was a total-loss type in which castor oil was pumped into the fuel–air mix. Castor oil was used because it did not readily dissolve into the fuel, and because it offered lubrication qualities superior to other available oils. Over two gallons of castor oil were sprayed into the air during each hour of engine operation. This explains why most rotaries were fitted with cowls, with the lowermost quarter omitted to direct the spray of castor oil away from the pilot. Unburnt castor oil from the engine had a laxative effect on the pilot if ingested. However, Monosoupape engines used less lubricating oil, and weighed slightly less, than earlier Gnome series engines with intake valves in the piston crown.

== Variants ==
Gnome Monosoupape 7 Type A
Seven-cylinder rotary engine, 80 hp (60 kW). Bore and stroke: 110 mm × 150 mm (4.3 in × 5.9 in) .
Gnome Monosoupape 9 Type B-2
Nine-cylinder rotary engine, 100 hp (75 kW). Bore and stroke: 110 mm × 150 mm (4.3 in × 5.9 in). This variant was produced under licence in the United Kingdom and the United States.
Gnome Monosoupape 11 Type C
An 11-cylinder version, 200 hp (150 kW).
Gnome Monosoupape 18 Type C
An 18-cylinder version, 240 hp (180 kW).
Gnome Monosoupape 9 Type N
(1917) nine-cylinder rotary engine, larger diameter crankcase than the B-2, 150 or 160 hp (112 or 119 kW), increasing capacity to 15.8 L (960 cu in). Bore and stroke: 115 mm × 170 mm (4.5 in × 6.7 in).
Gnome Monosoupape 9 Type R
180 hp nine-cylinder rotary engine, development of 9N with same 170 mm (6.7 in) stroke.

== Applications ==
=== Monosoupape 7 Type A ===
- Avro 504
- Avro 511
- Bristol-Coanda G.B.75
- Sopwith Pup
- Voisin L

=== Monosoupape 9 Type B ===
- Avro 504
- Airco DH.2
- Airco DH.5
- Blackburn Scout
- Blackburn Twin Blackburn
- Blackburn Triplane
- Bristol-Coanda T.B.8
- Bristol Scout
- FBA Type B Flying boat
- Nieuport IV
- Royal Aircraft Factory B.E.8
- Royal Aircraft Factory F.E.8
- Short S.80
- Short Type C
- Sopwith Sociable
- Sopwith Type 807 Folder Seaplane
- Sopwith Two-Seat Scout
- Sopwith Schneider
- Sopwith Pup
- Sopwith F.1 Camel
- Thomas-Morse S-4
- Vickers Gunbus (FB.2, 3, 5, 6 and 7)
- Vickers F.B.12
- Vickers F.B 19 Bullet

=== Monosoupape 9 Type N ===
- Morane-Saulnier AI
- Nieuport 28
- Orenco B
- Sopwith Camel

== Engines on display ==
- A nine-cylinder Monosoupape engine is on public display at the Royal Air Force Museum London.
- A nine-cylinder Monosoupape engine is on public display at the Aerospace Museum of California.
- A seven-cylinder Monosoupape engine is on display at Solent Sky.
- One Monosoupape built by Peter Hooker - England is on display at the Museo Nacional de Aeronáutica - Morón, Argentina. It is used during exhibitions to explain the rotary engines systems as it shows its operative internal parts.
- There is a restored B-2 Monosoupape on display at the New England Air Museum, Bradley Int'l Airport, Windsor Locks, CT, USA.
- TAVAS in Australia have two Monosoupape 9 Type Ns
- An original (unrestored) running nine-cylinder Monosoupape engine is on public display at the South Australian Aviation Museum.
- A nine-cylinder Monosoupape engine is on public display at the Musée aéronautique et spatial Safran.
- The Imperial War Museum has a Gnome Monosoupape B-2.
- The Shuttleworth Collection has a Gnome Monosoupape B-2 which is used at airshow events.

== Specifications (Monosoupape 9 Type B-2) ==
Data from Lumsden

=== General characteristics ===
- Type: 9-cylinder, single-row, rotary engine
- Bore: 110 mm (4.3 in)
- Stroke: 150 mm (5.9 in)
- Displacement: 12.8 L (780 cu in)
- Length: 107.4 cm (42.3 in)
- Diameter: 95 cm (37 in)
- Dry weight: 137.4 kg (303 lb)

=== Components ===
- Valvetrain: Single overhead valve with cylinder ports
- Fuel type: 40-50 Octane petrol
- Oil system: Total loss, castor oil
- Cooling system: Air-cooled
- Reduction gear: Direct drive, right-hand tractor, left-hand pusher

=== Performance ===
- Power output: 86 kW (115 hp) at 1,300 rpm (Maximum power)
- Compression ratio: 4.85:1

== See also ==
- Gnome Omega, Delta and Lambda (earlier seven-cylinder Gnome designs with inlet valve in piston crown)

Comparable engines

- Bentley BR1
- Clerget 7Z
- Clerget 9B
- Le Rhône 9J
- Oberursel U.I

Related lists

- List of aircraft engines
