= Aleksandr Dokuchayev =

Aleksandr Yakovlevich Dokuchayev was an aircraft designer and builder in Russia prior to and during World War I.

== Aircraft ==
Most aircraft built by Dokuchayev were modified Farman designs, each unique. His first aircraft, completed in 1910, was an Anzani-powered biplane of pusher configuration. With 50 hp, the aircraft was tested, but may never have flown. In 1912, he completed a sesquiplane version of a Farman IV, and in 1914 he flew another modified Farman type, this time a trainer aircraft with equal span wings and producing 80 hp with its Gnome-Rhone engine. His fourth model was a return to the sesquiplane configuration, producing a trainer with three rudders operated on skis. Number 5 was a simple monoplane of his own design, but his final design was another Farman modification.

Summary of aircraft built by Aviatsionnaya Ispitatelnaya Stantsiya
Model name	First flight	Number built	Type
Dokuchayev No.1	1910	1	Experimental aircraft
Dokuchayev No.2	1912	1	Experimental aircraft
Dokuchayev No.3	1914	1	Trainer aircraft
Dokuchayev No.4	1915	1	Trainer aircraft
Dokuchayev No.5	1916	1	Experimental aircraft
Dokuchayev No.6		1	Experimental aircraft

== See also ==
- List of aircraft (C-D)
- Vasily Dokuchaev
