= Alvear (airplane) =

Brazilian aircraft

General information
- Type: Experimental aircraft
- National origin: Brazil
- Designer: J. d'Alvear
- Number built: 1

History
- First flight: November 1914

The Alvear was a Brazilian single-engine, single-seat aircraft.

== Design and development ==
Her structure was made of wood paraná pine wing ribs and beech stringers, and externally covered with varnished linho. The engine was a 7-cylinder 60HP Gnome rotary type, with wooden Chauvier propellers. The landing gear was fixed, with front wheels and rear fixed metal skid.

It was built by J. d'Alvear with his own resources and completed in October 1914. The aircraft was registered by letter patent 8563. The first flight occurred in November 1914 piloted by Ambrósio Caragiolla, who fatally crashed in February 1915 with this same aircraft.

It was the second aircraft built in Brazil and, with the exception of the French engine and propellers, employed domestic materials and components in its manufacture.

== Specifications ==
Data from Pereira 1986, p. 5

General characteristics

- Crew: One
- Length: 6.80 m (22 ft 4 in)
- Upper wingspan: 8 m (26 ft 3 in)
- Height: 1.60 m (5 ft 3 in)
- Wing area: 16 m^{2} (170 sq ft)
- Empty weight: 200 kg (441 lb)
- Powerplant: 1 × Gnome Σ60 Sigma 7-cylinder rotary engine, 45 kW (60 hp)
- Propellers: 2-bladed Chauvier, 2.40 m (7 ft 10 in) diameter

Performance

- Maximum speed: 120 km/h (75 mph, 65 kn)
