= Caudron Type K =

General information
- Type: Two-seat floatplane
- National origin: France
- Manufacturer: Caudron
- Number built: 1

History
- First flight: 1913

The Caudron Type K was a French floatplane with a very powerful, twenty-cylinder radial engine in pusher configuration. It took part in a French seaplane competition in 1913, but was lost in a take-off accident during the competition.

== Design ==
Before the Type K, Caudron built two pusher floatplanes, the single-seat Hydroaéroplane Caudron-Fabre amphibian and a two-seat version of it for Claude Graham-White. The two-seat Type K was a significantly larger aircraft with three-bay wings, rather than two, and a much more powerful Anzani engine than before. Nonetheless it had shared many of the characteristics of early Caudron designs, with unequal span, two-spar wings, and open-frame fuselages bearing twin fins and rudders.

The Type K had rectangular-plan wings with slightly angled tips. The upper wing span was 45% greater than that of the lower; on each side the upper and lower wings were joined by three sets of vertical, parallel interplane struts and another parallel pair leaning outwards and upwards to brace the outer parts of the upper wing. A 149 kW (200 hp), twenty-cylinder, four-row air-cooled Anzani 20 radial engine was mounted in pusher configuration centrally between the wings, driving a propeller between the twin tailbooms. A cylindrical petrol (gasoline) tank was mounted laterally ahead of the engine and over the wing leading edge, at the back of a short fuselage pod in which the crew of two sat side-by-side in an open cockpit. This was a flat-sided structure, with its upper surface curving sharply downwards.

The rear part of the Type K's fuselage was an open structure with two girders, each vertically cross-braced and converging in profile, parallel to each other in plan and cross-linked horizontally at the tail. This was fairly standard on the Caudron airplanes of the period but was elaborated on the Type K by another long pair of members from the lower wing upwards; these secured the posts of a tall, narrow pair of constant-chord rudders with quadrantal tips. The tailplane, approximately rectangular in plan but cut away for rudder movement, was placed on the upper tail girders.

The Type K was a pure floatplane, with no permanent land wheels. The floats were 5.20 m (17 ft 1 in) long (more than half the fuselage length), single-stepped and rectangular in section, 500 mm (19.7 in) wide, and 800 mm (31.5 in) deep.

== Operational history ==
In 1913 the French Aero Club organised a seaplane contest. This was held between 24 and 31 August in Deauville and attracted aircraft from ten different French manufacturers. Some sent more than one model, for example, the Caudron Types J and K. René Caudron piloted the latter and his engineer, Alessandro Anzani, was the designer of its very new engine. Though not an amphibian, the Type K, classified as an avion de bord, could take-off from a wooden runway using a pair of discardable bogies and it won a prize of 6,000 francs by getting aloft after a 35 m (115 ft) run. Whilst taking off on 26 August, a float attachment failed when the Type K hit a large wave, causing the aircraft to capsize. Gaston Caudron, flying the Type J, successfully put down on the water to rescue the crew.

== Specifications ==
Data from Hauet (2001) p.51

General characteristics

- Crew: Two pilots
- Length: 10.0 m (32 ft 10 in)
- Upper wingspan: 18.15 m (59 ft 7 in)
- Lower wingspan: 12.15 m (39 ft 10 in)
- Wing area: 46 m^{2} (500 sq ft)
- Empty weight: 800 kg (1,764 lb)
- Gross weight: 1,400 kg (3,086 lb)
- Powerplant: 1 × Anzani 20 4-row, 20 cylinder air-cooled radial engine, 150 kW (200 hp)
- Propellers: 2-bladed Chauvrière, 3.10 m (10 ft 2 in) diameter)

Performance

- Maximum speed: 110 km/h (68 mph, 59 kn)
- Time to altitude: 10 min to 500 m (1,600 ft)
