= Vickers Hydravion =

Hydravion

General information
- Type: Flying boat
- National origin: United Kingdom
- Manufacturer: Vickers-Armstrongs
- Number built: 1

History
- First flight: 1912

The Vickers Hydravion (No.14) was a British seaplane built by Vickers in the early 1910s.

== Design ==
The Hydravion was a large seaplane of biplane configuration, which relied on the design philosophy of Henri Farman by utilizing a pusher engine and the tail being supported on outrigger booms. Only one seaplane version was built, and it crashed at Dartford during early tests.

A later version of the Hydravion, the Vickers No. 14B, would have had two 100 hp (75 kW) Gnome 9 Delta engines in tandem configuration buried in the fuselage, driving tractor propellers as well as a nose-mounted 37 mm (1.457 in) semi-automatic cannon.

== Specifications ==
Data from British Aircraft 1809-1914

General characteristics

- Crew: 1
- Capacity: 3 passengers
- Length: 43 ft (13 m)
- Wingspan: 72 ft 8 in (22.15 m)
- Height: 12 ft 2 in (3.71 m)
- Wing area: 819 sq ft (76.1 m^{2})
- Gross weight: 2,400 lb (1,089 kg)
- Powerplant: 1 × Gnome 9 Delta 9-cylinder air-cooled rotary piston engines, 100 hp (75 kW)
- Propellers: 2-bladed fixed-pitch pusher propeller

Performance

- Maximum speed: 51.5 mph (82.9 km/h, 44.8 kn)
- Stall speed: 32 mph (51 km/h, 28 kn)
