= Fokker D.V =

German biplane fighter of World War I

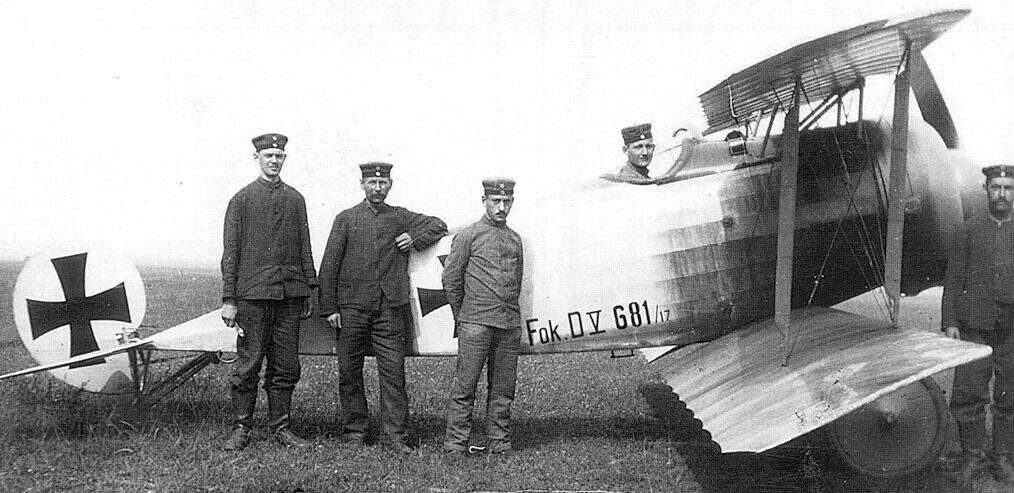

General information
- Type: Fighter
- Manufacturer: Fokker-Flugzeugwerke
- Designer: Martin Kreutzer
- Primary user: Luftstreitkräfte
- Number built: 300

History
- Introduction date: January 1917
- First flight: 1916

The Fokker D.V (Fokker designation M.22) was a biplane fighter designed by the Fokker Aircraft Company (Fokker-Flugzeugwerke) during the First World War for the Imperial German Army's (Deutsches Heer) Imperial German Air Service (Luftstreitkräfte) and the Imperial German Navy's (Kaiserliche Marine) Naval Air Service (Marine-Fliegerabteilung). Developed from the Fokker D.II, the aircraft was designed as a fighter trainer in 1916, although it also saw service in the fighter role in rear areas.

== Design and development ==
After the disappointing performance of his D.I through D.IV, Fokker resolved to produce a smaller, lighter rotary-powered design. The new prototype, designated M.22, was a development of the earlier single-bay D.II prototype with a 80-horsepower (60 kW) Oberursel U.0 rotary engine which Fokker had produced for the Austro-Hungarian Air Service as the B.II.

The prototype featured a swept-back upper wing to improve pilot view and it was fitted with ailerons rather than the wing warping used by the earlier aircraft. To reduce the M.22's drag, a circular cowling completely enclosed the 100 hp (75 kW) Oberursel U.I engine and the propeller was fitted with a spinner. To smooth the transition between the circular cowling and the straight sides of the fuselage, stringers were added to the forward fuselage. The aircraft proved to be highly maneuverable and it was ordered the M.22 into production as the D.V in three batches totaling 300 aircraft in October 1916.

== Operational history ==
Deliveries commenced in January 1917. Due to the low-compression Oberursel U.I, the D.V offered poor performance compared to the Albatros fighters. Most aircraft were assigned to fighter training schools. Seventy-two of these were used by the Naval Air Service to defend its airfields. When the Fokker Dr.I triplane entered service in late 1917, small numbers of D.V aircraft were issued to squadrons for use as conversion trainers for pilots unfamiliar with the characteristics of rotary-engined aircraft like the Dr.I.

== Specifications ==
General characteristics

- Crew: one
- Length: 6.05 m (19 ft 10 in)
- Wingspan: 8.75 m (28 ft 9 in)
- Height: 2.30 m (7 ft 6 in)
- Wing area: 15.5 m^{2} (167 sq ft)
- Empty weight: 363 kg (800 lb)
- Gross weight: 566 kg (1,248 lb)
- Powerplant: 1 × Oberursel U.I rotary , 82 kW (110 hp)

Performance

- Maximum speed: 170 km/h (106 mph, 92 kn)
- Range: 240 km (149 mi, 129 nmi)
- Service ceiling: 3,900 m (12,795 ft)
- Rate of climb: 2.6 m/s (520 ft/min)

Armament

- 1 × 7.92 mm (.312 in) LMG 08/15 machine gun

== Bibliography ==
- Gray, Peter & Thetford, Owen (1987) [1970]. German Aircraft of the First World War (2nd ed.). London: Putnam. ISBN 0-85177-809-7.
- Green, William & Swanborough, Gordon (2001) [1994]. The Complete Book of Fighters: An Illustrated Encyclopedia of Every Fighter Built and Flown (Revised and Updated ed.). London: Salamander Books. ISBN 1-84065-269-1.
- Grosz, Peter Michael; Haddow, George & Schiemer, Peter (1993). Austro-Hungarian Army Aircraft of World War One. Mountain View, California: Flying Machines Press. ISBN 0-9637110-0-8.
- Herris, Jack & Leckscheid, Jörn (2021). Fokker Aircraft of WWI: Volume 3: Early Biplane Fighters: A Centennial Perspective on Great War Airplanes. Great War Aviation Centennial Series. Vol. 53. n.p.: Aeronaut Books. ISBN 978-1-953201-05-8.
- Leaman, Paul (2001). Fokker Aircraft of World War One. Marlborough, UK: Crowood Press. ISBN 1-86126-353-8.
