= Feiro I =

Hungarian aircraft

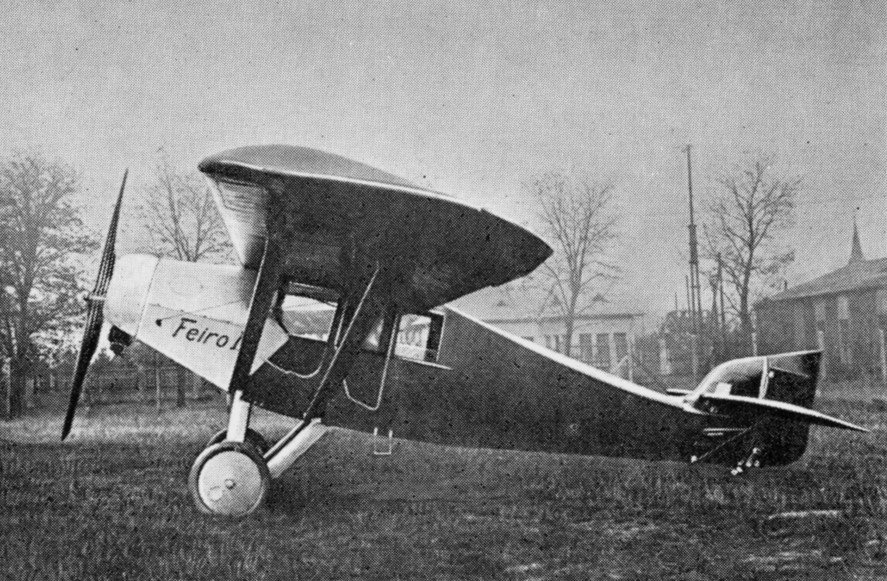

General information
- Type: Four seat civil transport
- National origin: Hungary
- Manufacturer: Feigl and Rotter
- Designer: Lajos Rotter
- Number built: 1

History
- First flight: late 1923-early 1924
- Developed into: Feiro Daru

The 1923 Feiro I was the first Hungarian designed and built civil transport aircraft, modified in 1925 by an engine change into the Feiru Daru (Crane). Neither was a commercial success.

== Design and development ==
The Feiro I was the first design of Lajos Rotter in his collaboration with the brothers Gyula and László Feigl. It was also the first civil transport to be designed in Hungary, flying in the winter of 1923-4. It had four seats and was powered by a 120 hp (89 kW) Le Rhone 9J rotary engine, though it was intended that this would be replaced by Haake or Siemens-Halske radial engines of similar power in production aircraft.

It was a high wing monoplane, with an aerodynamically thick (thickness/chord ratio 14%) Joukowski-Göttingen "tadpole shaped" airfoil over the whole span. The two piece, 3-ply covered wing was built around twin spruce flanged box spars with 3-ply webs. In plan it had constant chord and was unswept; the wingtips were angled and the short ailerons tapered slightly outboard. Each wing was braced to the fuselage with a parallel pair of airfoil section struts from the wing spars to the lower fuselage longerons.

Behind the engine the fuselage was rectangular in cross-section, with four longerons and 3-ply covered. The Le Rhone rotary was partially enclosed within an open-bottomed engine cowling and was mounted on steel tube bearings. Aluminium sheet, rounded on the upper surface, covered the fuselage rearwards to the cabin. There were two firewalls between engine and cabin and the carburetter, gravity-fed fuel from a tank in the central wing, was placed in the ventilated space between them.

The deep cabin of the Feiro I had two rows side-by-side seats; the front pair could both be equipped with flight controls or one of then could serve as a third passenger seat. Because the high engine fairing reached the underside of the wing leading edge, there was no central forward view from the controls; instead, there were deep openings on either side. Access to the cabin was via a port side door. Behind the cabin the fuselage tapered to the tail where a short, broad fin carried a deep rudder. The tailplane was also mounted on the fin, just above the fuselage so that it could be used to trim the aircraft by altering its angle of incidence. It had swept leading edges, square tips and carried elevators with a cut-out for rudder movement. The fixed tail surfaces were ply skinned and the control surfaces fabric covered.

The Feiro I had a tailskid undercarriage with mainwheels 2 m (6 ft 7 in) apart and rubber sprung on a single axle, its ends supported by longitudinal V-struts and positioned laterally by a steel V-strut; all struts were from the lower fuselage longerons.

The first flight was late in 1923 or in January 1924, though the exact date is not known. Some testing had been done by mid-February, establishing good handling and a take-off distance of around 46 m (150 ft) but detailed performance figures had yet to be established. By March an estimated maximum speed of 160 km/h (99 mph) had been confirmed. Feiro's resources were limited and they had difficulty obtaining some important raw materials, even in small quantities, receiving no public support for the Feiro I's development. Hungary's manufacturers lost many of their material suppliers when the country's boundaries were shrunk by the Treaty of Trianon after the end of World War I.

Despite these problems, two years later and after their innovative high aspect ratio biplane trainer aircraft, the Feiro Dongó, Feiro flew a Feiro I production development, largely unchanged but with a more modern, 180 hp (134 kW) Hispano-Suiza 8A water-cooled V-8 engine in a revised nose which provided better forward visibility through a front-facing windscreen. This was given the name Feiro Daru. Other differences between it and the Feiro I were the addition of about 2º of sweep to the wing, moving the center of pressure rearwards, and a revised tail similar in shape to that used on the Feiro Dongó, with a straight edged fin and deep, curved, balanced rudder. Its empty weight was increased by 70 kg (154 lb) but its useful load also increased by 30 kg (66 lb). It was faster, with a maximum speed increased by 10–20 km/h (6–12 mph), climbed to 1,000 m (3,281 ft) in 8 minutes and had a ceiling of 1,000 m (3,281 ft). Despite the improvements the Daru still failed to find customers and only one was built; this may have originally been the sole Feiro I.

After these commercial failures with powered designs, Rotter became instead a successful glider pilot and designer. Flying his first such design, the 1933 Karakan, Rotter became Hungary's first "Silver C" glider pilot.

== Variants ==
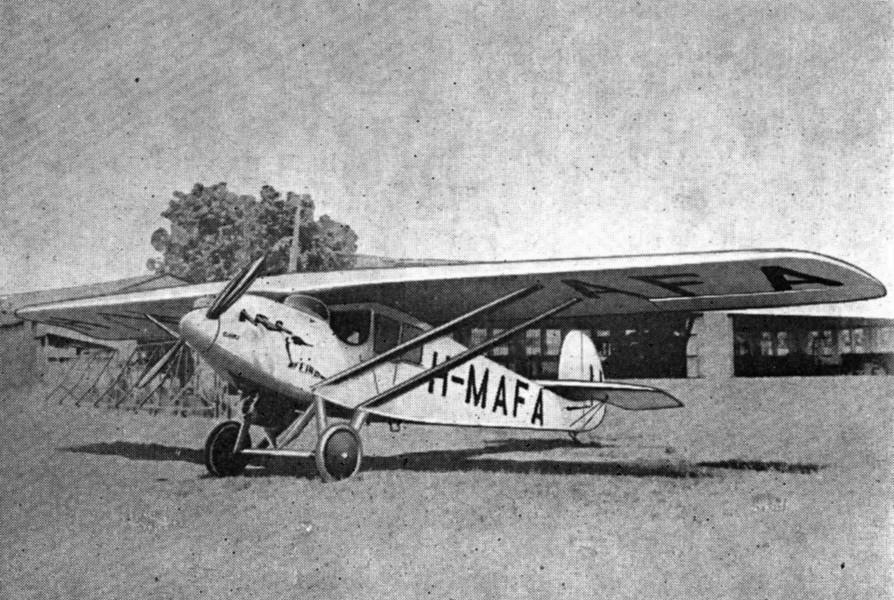
Feiro Daru

Feiro I
1923 version with 120 hp (89 kW) Le Rhone 9J rotary engine.
Feiro Daru
1925 version with 180 hp (134 kW) Hispano-Suiza 8A water-cooled V-8 engine, a slightly swept wing and revised vertical tail.

== Specifications (Feiro I) ==
Data from Flight 14 February 1924, pp.86-7

General characteristics

- Crew: One pilot
- Capacity: Three passengers
- Length: 8.83 m (29 ft 0 in)
- Wingspan: 14.25 m (46 ft 9 in)
- Wing area: 26 m^{2} (280 sq ft)
- Airfoil: Joukowski-Göttingen, thickness/chord ratio=14%
- Empty weight: 750 kg (1,653 lb)
- Gross weight: 1,200 kg (2,646 lb)
- Powerplant: 1 × Le Rhone 9J 9-cylinder rotary engine, 89 kW (120 hp)
- Propellers: two-bladed

Performance

- Maximum speed: 160 km/h (99 mph, 86 kn)
- Time to altitude: 6 min to1,000 m (3,300 ft)
- Take-off distance: 45 m (148 ft)
