= Caudron Type L =

- Type L at the 1913 Paris Salon

General information
- Type: Naval observation aircraft
- National origin: France
- Manufacturer: Caudron
- Number built: 4

History
- First flight: c.1913

The Caudron Type L was a two-seat French pusher configuration amphibious biplane, flown around 1913 and intended for naval use.

== Design ==
With unequal span, two bay, unstaggered wings and an open frame fuselage, the Type L had much in common with the smaller Caudron-Fabre pusher amphibian, as well as with tractor configuration Type J amphibians and Type H floatplanes, some of which were also amphibians. Most of the earlier Caudron biplane types had similar wings and fuselages. The Type L had three sets of parallel and vertical interplane struts on each side, the innermost close to the central nacelle and bracing the centre section. The overhanging upper wing were braced by a pair of parallel, outward leaning struts, which joined the lower wing at the base of the outer vertical struts. The inner struts, to which the engine was attached, were ash and the remainder hollowed-out spruce; all joined the rather close pairs of spars in the upper and lower wings. Diagonal flying wires completed the bracing. The interplane gap was 1.65 m (5 ft 5 in). Lateral (roll) control was by wing warping.

The Type L did not have a long, enclosed fuselage; instead, the empennage was supported on an open girder. The Type L, unusually for Caudron, had two parallel-sided, cross-braced side frames. The longitudinal members were steel and the cross-members ash. The side frames began from the rear spars of both upper and lower wings and converged rearwards to meet at the tail, with upper and lower cross-members towards the rear. A short nacelle on the lower wing contained an open, wide cockpit with side-by-side seating, the pilot on the right. Controls were conventional. The nacelle ended behind the forward wing spar, ahead of the 100 hp (75 kW) Gnome Delta nine cylinder rotary engine mounted on the rear interplane struts and driving a two blade propeller via 2:1 reduction gearing and a long shaft to clear the trailing edge. At the extreme tail, the final vertical frame member served as the axis for the rudder, with a small, roughly triangular fin ahead of it. The elevator hinge was also mounted high on this member, with a straight edged tailplane ahead of it.

The Type L had short floats, flat bottomed with no chine but in plan and profile curving inwards to the nose. Unlike the Fabre floats of the Caudron-Fabre, these had a step about halfway back. A landing wheel was located on the float centreline, working on an unsprung axle in a slot through to the upper side. The floats were mounted on outer N-form struts to the bases of the inner interplane struts and by W-form struts to the lower longitudinal girder member, pivoted at the front with rubber shock absorbers at the rear. Another rectangular cross-section but unstepped float was positioned under the tail.

The first prototype, intended for delivery to the British Navy, appeared at the 1913 Paris Salon in December, but it is not known if it had been flown by then. It was destroyed by fire after an engine backfire during tests. The second was trialled by the French Navy, which found it unsatisfactory. It was then delivered to the British as a replacement for the lost first prototype. The last two were rebuilt as Type J marines and used by the French Navy.

== Specifications ==
Data from Hauet (2001) p.53

General characteristics

- Crew: One pilot
- Capacity: One passenger
- Length: 8.05 m (26 ft 5 in)
- Upper wingspan: 14.7 m (48 ft 3 in)
- Lower wingspan: 9.3 m (30 ft 6 in)
- Height: 3.1 m (10 ft 2 in)
- Wing area: 40 m^{2} (430 sq ft)
- Empty weight: 510 kg (1,124 lb)
- Gross weight: 730 kg (1,609 lb)
- Powerplant: 1 × Gnome Delta 9-cylinder rotary, 75 kW (100 hp)
- Propellers: 2-bladed, 3.0 m (9 ft 10 in) diameter

Performance

- Maximum speed: 90 km/h (56 mph, 49 kn)
