= Bristol S.S.A. =

S.S.A.

General information
- Type: Armoured scout
- National origin: England
- Manufacturer: Bristol
- Designer: Henri Coanda
- Number built: 1

History
- First flight: 8 May 1914

The Bristol S.S.A., (Single-Seat Armoured), was an armoured scout built at Bristol in 1914 to fulfill a French government order.

== Design and development ==
At the request of the French government, Henri Coanda designed a single-seat armoured biplane. The forward fuselage was built as a monocoque shell built up from sheet steel, colloquially known as 'The Bath', at the Filton works. The armoured shell enclosed the engine, fuel tank, oil tank and cockpit, with the pilot's seat being formed from the shaped rear bulkhead.

The 80 hp (60 kW) Clerget 7Z was fully cowled with sheet steel and drove a two-bladed propeller which had a large sheet steel spinner, perforated to allow cooling air to the rotary engine, and an internal sheet steel cone preventing bullet entry through the cooling holes.

Staggered biplane main-planes were mounted as far forward as possible to ensure that the centre of pressure maintained the correct position relative to the centre of gravity. The lower main-planes were attached to a framework, leaving a gap between wing root and fuselage.

The undercarriage consists of two wheels mounted on struts, with long skids which extended rearwards removing the need for a tail-skid. A feature of the undercarriage requested by the French customer was castering main-wheels allowing cross-wind landings.

Attached to the rear end of the armoured tub was a slender rear fuselage which ended with a large balanced rudder, tailplane and elevator.

== Operational history ==
The sole prototype, given the serial 'No.219', was first flown at Larkhill on 8 May 1914 with a temporary aluminium spinner due to vibration with the steel assembly. The S.S.A. Also flew at Farnborough but was damaged in a heavy landing. After repairs the S.S.A. Was flown again on 25 June 1914 at Filton, by Harry Busteed, but broke an undercarriage bracing wire on landing. Despite the damage and without being repaired, the S.S.A. was delivered to the French customer at the La Brayelle, Douai, works of Breguet for repair on 3 July 1914. When the Douai factory was forced to be evacuated to Villacoublay by the German invasion of France at the start of the First World War, the S.S.A. was not taken along, and no further records of the S.S.A. exists.

== Specifications (S.S.A.) ==
Data from Bristol Aircraft since 1910

General characteristics

- Crew: 1
- Length: 19 ft 9 in (6.02 m)
- Wingspan: 27 ft 4 in (8.33 m)
- Wing area: 200 sq ft (19 m^{2})
- Empty weight: 913 lb (414 kg)
- Gross weight: 1,200 lb (544 kg)
- Powerplant: 1 × Clerget 7Z 7-cyl. air-cooled rotary piston engine, 80 hp (60 kW)

Performance

- Maximum speed: 106 mph (171 km/h, 92 kn)
- Endurance: 3 hours
