= Sopwith Two-Seat Scout =

General information
- Type: Anti-Zeppelin biplane
- Manufacturer: Sopwith Aviation Company
- Primary user: Royal Naval Air Service
- Number built: 24

History
- First flight: 1914

The Sopwith Two-Seat Scout (or Type 880) was a 1910s British biplane Anti-Zeppelin scout biplane designed and built for the Admiralty by the Sopwith Aviation Company. It was nicknamed the Spinning Jenny due to a tendency to enter a spin.

== Design and development ==
First flown in November 1914 the Two-Seat Scout was developed from the 1914 Circuit of Britain seaplane. It was two-bay unswept biplane with equal span wings and ailerons fitted on all four wings and a braced tailplane and a single rudder. It had a fixed tailskid landing gear with a cross-axle type main gear with twin wheels carried on vee legs under the fuselage. It was powered by a nose-mounted 100 hp (75 kW) Gnome Monosoupape rotary engine driving a two-bladed propeller. It had two tandem open cockpits and could carry small bombs under the fuselage.

== Operators ==
United Kingdom

- Royal Naval Air Service

== Specifications ==
General characteristics

- Crew: 2
- Length: 27 ft 6 in (8.38 m)
- Wingspan: 36 ft 6 in (11.13 m)
- Height: 8 ft 8 in (2.64 m)
- Wing area: 440 sq ft (41 m^{2})
- Empty weight: 1,160 lb (526 kg)
- Gross weight: 1,800 lb (816 kg)
- Powerplant: 1 × Gnome Monosoupape nine-cylinder air-cooled rotary engine , 100 hp (75 kW)

Performance

- Maximum speed: 69 mph (111 km/h, 60 kn)
- Endurance: 3 hours 30 minutes

== See also ==
Related lists

- List of aircraft of the Royal Naval Air Service
- List of flying boats and floatplanes
