= Gotha LD 5 =

LD 5
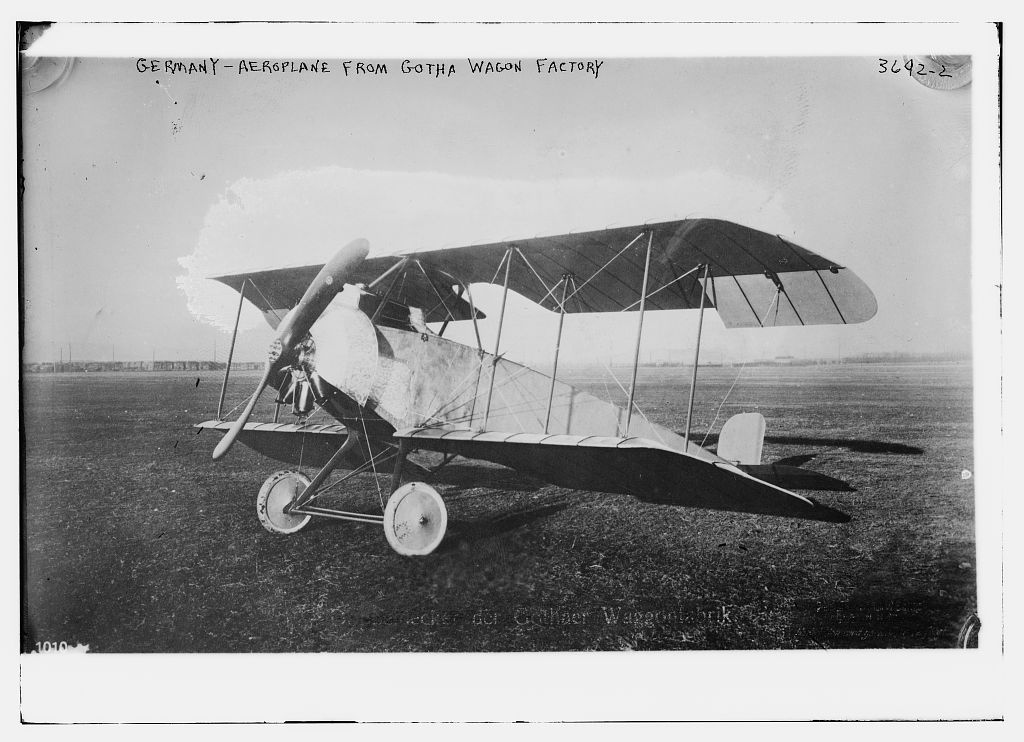

General information
- Type: Military utility aircraft
- National origin: Germany
- Manufacturer: Gotha
- Primary user: Luftstreitkräfte
- Number built: 6

History
- First flight: 1914

The Gotha LD 5 (for Land Doppeldecker - "Land Biplane") was a military aircraft produced in Germany during the early part of World War I.

== Development ==
Developed to the Kavallerie Flugzeug requirement for light fast scouting aircraft, the LD 5 was used for training and reconnaissance, it was a conventional design with two-bay unstaggered wings, tailskid landing gear, and a single open cockpit. Flight tests showed it to be unable to live up to intended reconnaissance duties and so the LD 5 was relegated to being a trainer. The LD 5's short wings also rendered it confined to long runways, but the LD 5 was ordered into modest production despite deficiencies.

== Operators ==
Germany

- Luftstreitkrafte

== Specifications (LD 5) ==
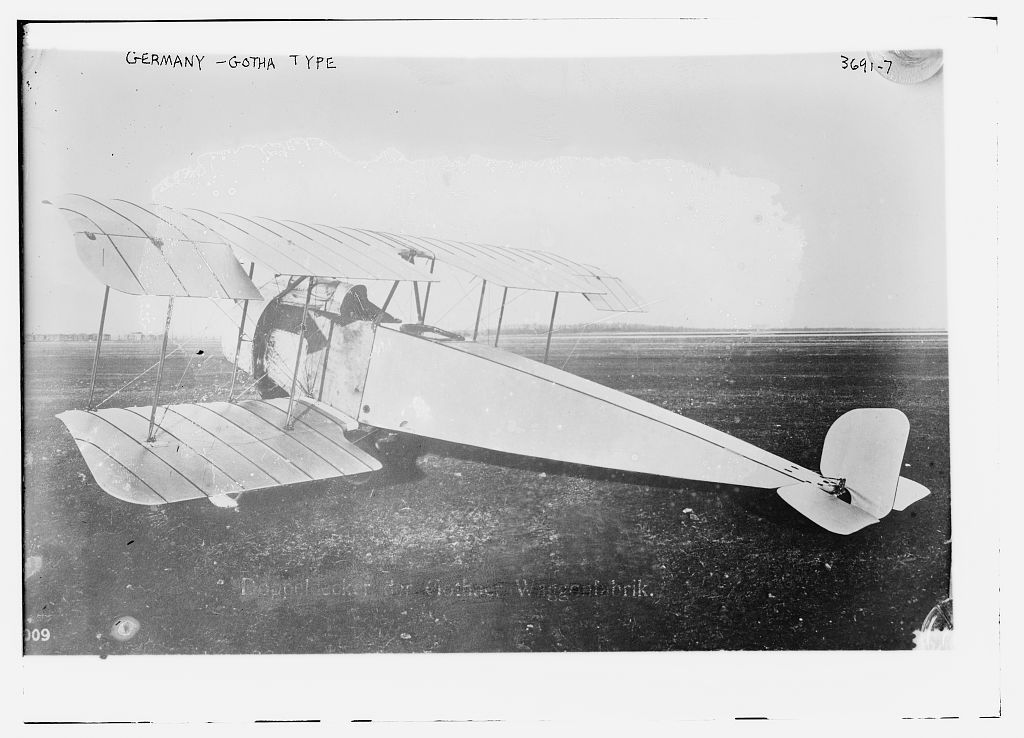
rear side view showing the single cockpit

Data from

General characteristics

- Crew: 1
- Length: 5.8 m (19 ft 0 in)
- Wingspan: 8.7 m (28 ft 7 in)
- Empty weight: 385 kg (849 lb)
- Powerplant: 1 × Oberursel U.I 9-cylinder air-cooled rotary piston engine, 75 kW (100 hp)
- Propellers: 2-bladed fixed-pitch propeller

Performance

- Maximum speed: 115 km/h (71 mph, 62 kn)
- Cruise speed: 105 km/h (65 mph, 57 kn)

== See also ==
Related development

- Gotha LD.1
