= Gnome Sigma =

1900s French aircraft piston engine

Sigma
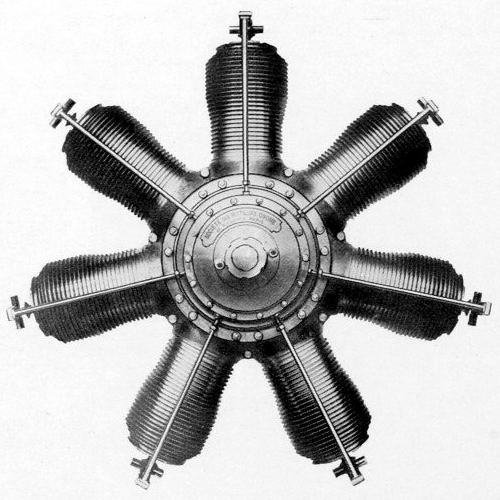
- Gnome 7 Sigma as shown in a 1913 Gnome catalog
- Type: Rotary aero engine
- National origin: France
- Manufacturer: Société des Moteurs Gnome

The Gnome 7Σ Sigma (commonly called the Gnome 60 hp) is a French seven-cylinder, air-cooled rotary aero engine.

The Sigma produced 60 hp (45 kW) from its capacity of 9.5 L (579.73 cu in).

== Specifications (7 Sigma) ==
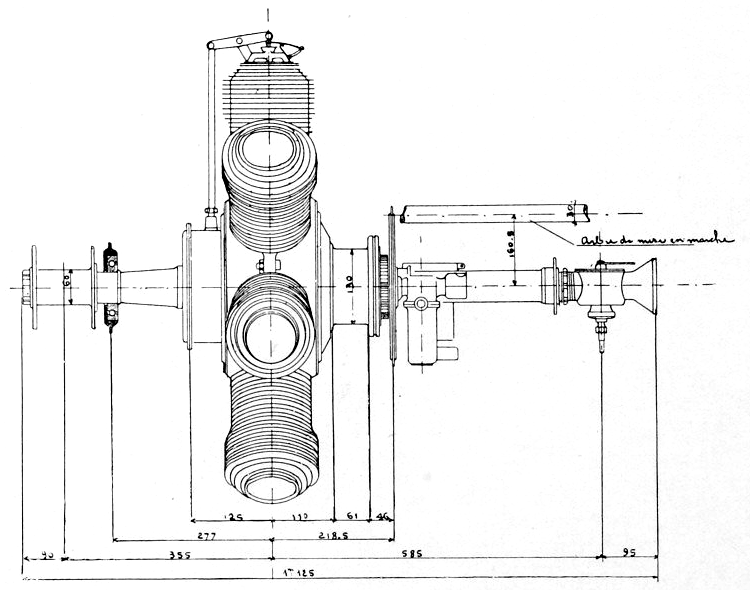
Longitudinal elevation of Gnome 7 Sigma, from 1913 Gnome catalog

Data from Société Des Moteurs Gnome

=== General characteristics ===
- Type: 7-cylinder, single-row, rotary engine
- Bore: 120 mm (4.72 in)
- Stroke: 120 mm (4.72 in)
- Displacement: 9.5 L (579.73 cu in)
- Length: 1,125 mm (44.29 in)79 cm (31 in)
- Diameter: 826 mm (32.52 in)
- Dry weight: 79 kg (174 lb)

=== Components ===
- Valvetrain: pushrod operated overhead exhaust valves plus pressure-driven inlet valves located in the piston crowns
- Fuel system: a single static Bloctube carburretor feeding the crankcase
- Fuel type: 40 / 50 octane gasoline
- Oil system: pressure-fed total loss, castor oil
- Cooling system: Air-cooled
- Reduction gear: Direct drive, right-hand tractor, left-hand pusher

=== Performance ===
- Power output: 45 kW (60 hp) at 1,200 rpm

== See also ==
Comparable engines

- Clerget 7Z
- Le Rhône Type 7A
- Le Rhône Type 7B
- Le Rhône Type 7B2

Related lists

- List of aircraft engines
