= Tandon Motorcycles =

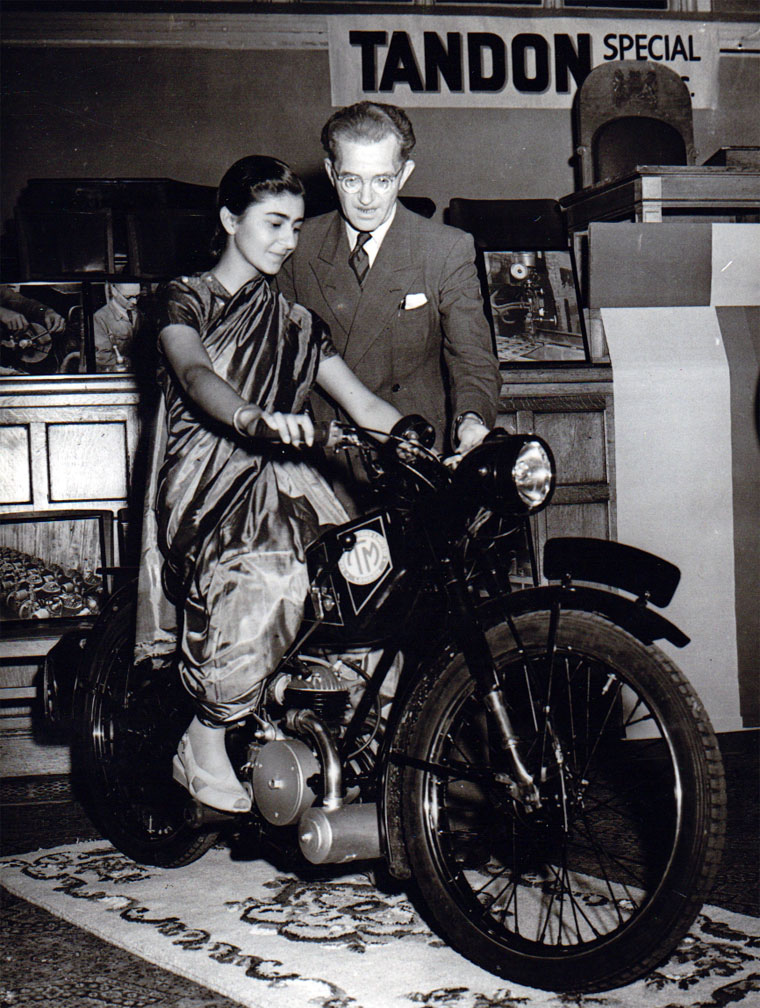
122cc Tandon Milemaster

Tandon Motorcycles were manufactured in Watford by Devdutt Tandon (1902–1980)—from 1947 to 1959—for export to his native India and other third world countries initially. The simplicity of the initial Tandon design reflected the chosen export market where the two-stroke engined motorcycles were to be sent CKD (Completely Knocked Down) for assembly abroad. Indeed, it took one Tandon factory worker only eight hours to completely assemble four Tandon motorcycles. The model in question was the 122 cc Milemaster, powered like all but the last Tandons by a Villiers two-stroke engine. Tandon received great publicity when Pandit Nehru, the prime minister of India, was photographed astride a Milemaster while visiting Caxton Hall in 1948.

The export plan never materialised and the Milemaster, with its modest specification—hand gear change and bicycle seat—and lacking rear suspension, was marketed instead in the United Kingdom until 1952. In 1949, Tandon introduced the 122 cc Superglid featuring conventional foot gear-change and a new frame with swinging-arm rear suspension. However, the suspension itself was highly unusual with damper units being replaced by a bell crank linked to rubber bands for suspension and a hard rubber block for compression action, all located under the gearbox.

Sufficient sales enabled Tandon to move to larger premises within Watford from Bushey Hall Road to Colne Way and introduce the larger-engined 197 cc Superglid Supreme. The short-lived (1951–1953) but relatively popular 122 cc Kangaroo trials model boasted the attractions of significant ground clearance and light weight with a 197 cc Kangaroo Supreme also featuring conventional damper units in the swinging-arm rear suspension. A Tandon 200 cc scrambler model enjoyed success beating a factory-sponsored 500 cc BSA motorcycle in an Irish handicap race in 1956.

Replacing the Milemaster was the 122 cc Imp which sacrificed rear suspension for light weight. However, the later, larger 197 cc Imp Supreme adopted conventional rear suspension.

New roadster models with conventional rear suspension, stronger frames and bigger engines were introduced in 1954 being the 224 cc Monarch (also known as the Sprite) and, with a 242 cc British Anzani (and later 322 cc) two-stroke twin cylinder engine, the Viscount (also known as the Twin Supreme). These did not have as standard the telescopic front fork as fitted to prior Tandon models but instead boasted an Armstrong Earles-fork arrangement. These and the new 99 cc Starlett scooter could not stop Tandon Motors Limited being wound-up in 1955 by the United Kingdom Commissioners of Custom & Excise, their sales hampered by a dealer network not extending outside London. Devdutt Tandon was able however to continue manufacture of his motorcycles through his other firm Indian Commerce & Industries Limited until 1959.

Despite the Milemaster design and manufacture having shown "a good deal of thought", Tandon motorcycles suffered from a poor reputation, enjoying only limited popularity. Their simplistic approach, perhaps born out of an initial design philosophy catering for the third world market, finally was neither sold cheap enough to attract the budget market nor was of sufficient quality to challenge other similar lightweight competitor marques. That said, there were positives: the Milemaster being described as "an absolute hoot to ride" with "staggering" fuel economy of around 100 miles per gallon.
