= Weymann W-1 =

General information
- Type: Single seat fighter
- National origin: France
- Manufacturer: Société de St Chamond, Villacoublay
- Designer: Charles Terrès-Weymann
- Number built: 1

History
- First flight: Autumn 1915

The Weymann W-1 was a French single seat biplane fighter aircraft, built during World War I. It had a most unusual layout, with an engine buried in the fuselage driving a pusher configuration propeller behind a cruciform tail. It was not successful and soon abandoned.

== Design ==
Apart from its rear mounted pusher propeller, shaft driven from a centrally mounted engine, the W-1 was unusual in other respects. It was an all-metal aircraft; a single bay biplane with constant chord, equal span, unswept and unstaggered wings, braced by parallel interplane struts assisted by flying wires. There were ailerons on both upper and lower planes, externally connected.

The deep, flat sided and flat topped fuselage entirely filled the interwing space, with the pilot's open cockpit immediately level with and ahead of the upper wing leading edge. He had twin machine guns faired into the upper surface ahead of him and, beyond, a smooth, rounded nose. The absence of engine and propeller gave him a good forward view and avoided the need for engine-gun synchronisation. The engine was behind him at the aircraft's centre of gravity (cg), totally enclosed within the fuselage. An intake into the underside of the fuselage immediately below the cockpit provided cooling air for the 80 hp (60 kW) Clerget 7Z rotary engine, which had an exhaust in the upper fuselage. The fuselage tapered both in height and width to the tail, where the tailplane and split elevators were mounted on its upper surface. The upper fin and rudder was quite short but the lower part extended well below the lower wing in level flight. All the tail surfaces had curved leading edges; the two blade propeller was immediately behind their straight trailing edges.

The W-1's undercarriage was also unusual. Though the mainwheels were conventionally positioned close to the cg and mounted on a rigid single axle attached to the fuselage by a pair of V-struts, it had a nosewheel of about the same diameter; unlike that of modern tricycle gear it was well above the ground when the aircraft was in the level flight position. On the ground the W-1 rested level on its mainwheels and a tailskid on the tall lower fin.

The W-1 made only two short test flights, the first in the autumn of 1915, which revealed severe and ultimately insurmountable cooling problem with the buried engine. The development programme was abandoned in December 1915.

== Specifications ==
Data from Green and Swansborough

General characteristics

- Crew: One
- Wing area: 23.00 m^{2} (247.6 sq ft)
- Powerplant: 1 × Clerget 7Z 7-cylinder radial, 60 kW (80 hp)
- Propellers: 2-bladed pusher configuration

Armament

- Guns: 2× fixed machine guns
