= AGO DV.3 =

DV.3
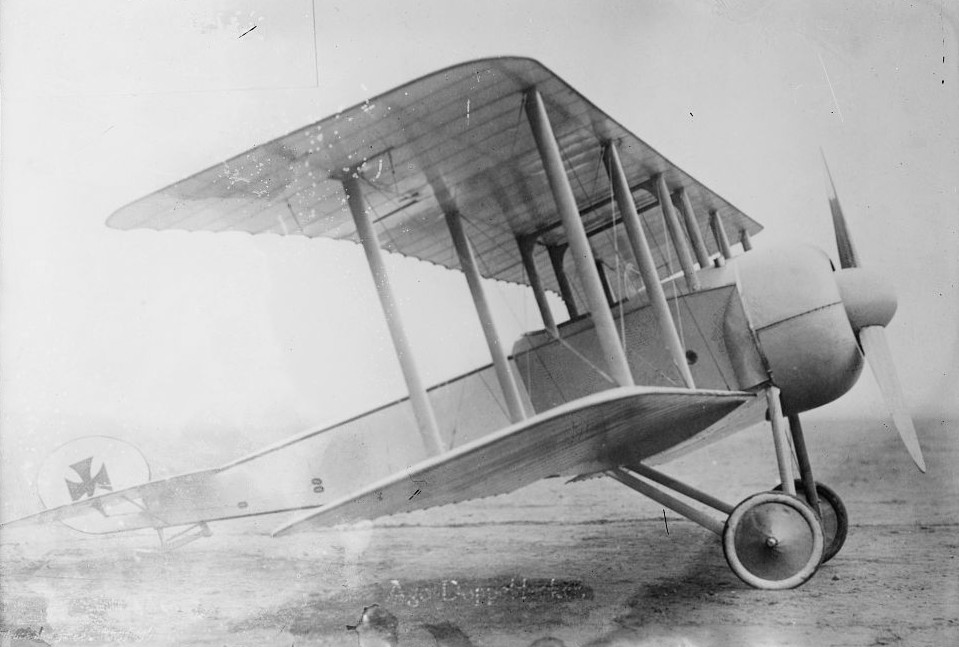
- The AGO DV.3 in 1915

General information
- Type: fighter aircraft
- Manufacturer: AGO Flugzeugwerke
- Designer: A. Haefeli

History
- First flight: 1915

The DV.3 was a prototype fighter aircraft built and tested by AGO in 1915. It was a two-bay biplane of conventional configuration with a neatly cowled engine. Development was delayed by AGO's commitment to building reconnaissance aircraft, and when the DV.3 flew, its performance was found to be far lower than predicted and all further development work was abandoned. Nevertheless, 3 were built and ultimately purchased by the German Navy under serials S.56-S.58 for their land-based air service.

S 56 (Fabrik Nr. 140) with 100 HP Gnome motor (Nr. 3230). It was accepted by the Navy on 01.12.1914 and used at Johannisthal until 02/1915. On 11.02.1915, the airplane crashed from a height of 80 meters on the ground at Adlershof. The plane was totally destroyed. and the pilot was badly wounded.

S 57 (Fabrik Nr. 80) with 100 HP Gnome motor (Nr. 3295). It was accepted by the navy on 10.12.1914 and used at Johannisthal until 13.03.1915 when it was sent back to AGO for modification. On 27.05.1915 it was sent to LFS Wilhelmshaven. There it was in use until 09/1915. Its ultimate fate is unknown.

S 58 (Fabrik Nr. 125) was accepted by the navy on 23.09.1915 and used at Johannisthal. No further data available.

== Specifications ==
General characteristics

- Crew: one, pilot
- Length: 6.2 m (20 ft 4 in)
- Wingspan: 8.5 m (27 ft 11 in)
- Height: 2.46 m (8 ft 1 in)
- Wing area: 16.1 m^{2} (173 sq ft)
- Empty weight: 445 kg (980 lb)
- Gross weight: 760 kg (1,680 lb)
- Powerplant: 1 × Oberursel U.I , 74 kW (99 hp)

Performance

- Maximum speed: 150 km/h (90 mph, 78 kn)
- Endurance: 1.5 hours
- Service ceiling: 4,000 m (13,000 ft)
