= Sopwith Type 807 =

1910s British biplane seaplane

General information
- Type: Reconnaissance seaplane
- Manufacturer: Sopwith Aviation Company
- Primary user: Royal Naval Air Service
- Number built: 12

History
- First flight: 1914

The Sopwith Admiralty Type 807 was a 1910s British biplane seaplane designed and built for the Admiralty by the Sopwith Aviation Company.

== Development ==
In July 1914, Sopwith produced a two-bay tractor biplane powered by a 100 hp (75 kW) Gnome Monosoupape rotary engine to compete in the 1914 Daily Mail Circuit of Britain race for seaplanes. It made its maiden flight as a landplane on 16 July 1914, before being fitted with its planned floatplane undercarriage. On the outbreak of the First World War in August 1914 the Circuit of Britain aircraft was bought by the RNAS .

A version of the circuit of Britain aircraft was ordered by the Admiralty, becoming known as the Type 807. First delivered to the RNAS in July 1914 the Type 807 differed from the Circuit of Britain in several respects. The span of the upper wing was increased, the overhang being braced by kingposts and the wings were adapted to fold, using the Short Brothers patented mechanism; to simplify this, the wings were not staggered. It had twin strut-mounted floats under the fuselage and a float mounted under the tail. It was powered by a nose-mounted 100 hp (75 kW) Gnome Monosoupape engine. It had two tandem open cockpits with the observer in the forward cockpit under the upper wing leading edge and the pilot in the rear cockpit under the upper wing trailing edge. It was sometimes referred to as the Sopwith Folder. Sopwith developed the Circuit of Britain aircraft into a landplane (the Sopwith Two-Seat Scout)

== Operational history ==
The Circuit of Britain aircraft was given the serial number 896 when it was taken over by the Royal Navy. Its undercarriage was damaged in September, causing it to be refitted with a landplane undercarriage. It was used as a trainer until 22 June 1915.

Twelve Type 807s were ordered by the RNAS. Three of them formed part of the embarked air wing aboard the seaplane carrier HMS Ark Royal when it sailed for the Dardanelles in February 1915. They were used as reconnaissance aircraft, but proved to be underpowered, with fragile floats.

== Operators ==
United Kingdom

- Royal Naval Air Service

== Specifications ==
General characteristics

- Crew: 2
- Length: 30 ft 9 in (9.37 m)
- Wingspan: 43 ft 6 in (13.26 m)
- Height: 11 ft 2 in (3.40 m)
- Wing area: 405 sq ft (37.6 m^{2})
- Empty weight: 1,580 lb (717 kg)
- Gross weight: 2,440 lb (1,107 kg)
- Maximum speed: 80 mph (130 km/h, 70 kn)

Armament

- Six small bombs

== See also ==
Related lists

- List of aircraft of the Royal Naval Air Service
- List of flying boats and floatplanes
