= Feiro Dongó =

Dongó
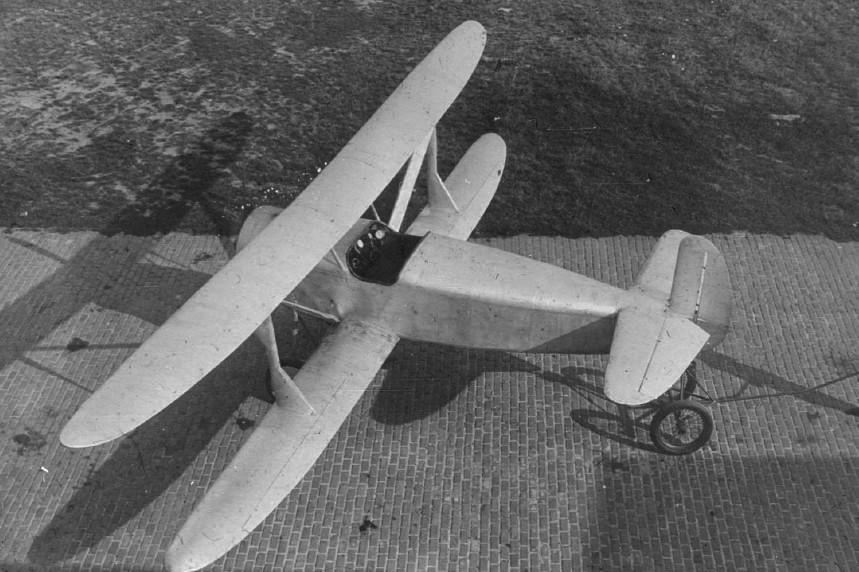

General information
- Type: Side-by-side trainer aircraft
- National origin: Hungary
- Manufacturer: Feigl and Rotter (Feiro)
- Designer: Lajos Rotter
- Number built: 1

History
- First flight: 1924

The Feiro Dongó (in English, Feiro Bumblebee) was a Hungarian side-by-side trainer biplane. It was notable for its high aspect ratio wings, aerodynamic clearness and high lift/drag ratio.

== Design ==
The Feiro Dongó was the second design of Lajos Rotter in his collaboration with the brothers Gyula and László Feigl. Rotter aimed to produce a training aircraft of high aerodynamic refinement with a high lift to drag ratio (L/D) which was also stable but responsive to the controls, structurally strong, easy to land and with a good all-round view from the cockpit. An innovative wing design was a key feature. The Dongó was a biplane with wings of very high aspect ratio and modified elliptical plan, thus minimising induced drag. The upper wing had an aspect ratio of 16.9, very high at the time, and both wings had a root chord of only 800 mm (31.5 in), though the lower was 1.0 m (3 ft 3 in) shorter. Both had thick airfoils. The very narrow wings were claimed to provide longitudinal stability, as the centre of pressure could not move far, and further pitch stability was provided by heavy stagger, with the lower wing 600 mm (23.6 in) behind the upper. The two wings were set at different angles of attack, 0° on the lower and 2° on the upper, again with the intention of improving longitudinal stability To provide roll stability the upper wing had dihedral beyond a short centre section. The latter was supported by a steel tube cabane which had pairs of vertical, kinked struts, faired in the upper part, and a forward, transverse inverted-V, all joined to the upper fuselage. This structure made it possible to vary the upper wing's angle of incidence and the stagger. The wings were 3-ply covered, two spar structures. High aspect ratio, metal covered ailerons were mounted on the lower wings.

The Dongó's wings were simply braced compared with most biplanes of the day, with an arrangement made possible by the narrow chord and large stagger. A single, vertical, faired interplane strut on each side braced the rear spar of the upper wing to the lower forward spar. Towards its top a metal faired-in oblique strut braced the forward, upper spar and there was a similar arrangement at its foot to the rear spar. To minimise drag, there were no conventional cross bracing flying wires but instead a single, faired diagonal strut from the top of each interplane struts to the corresponding lower fuselage longeron.

The Dongó's rectangular section fuselage was built around four longerons, with bottom and sides covered with plywood. The rounded upper decking was light metal. Its cross-section was determined by a 1,200 mm (47.2 in) wide cockpit containing the side-by-side seating. This was placed over the lower wings but aft of the upper trailing edge, providing an excellent view both upwards and downwards. The Dongó could be fitted with dual control or flown with one set removed. The steel framed cabane under the upper wing was intended to give the occupants protection in the case of an overturning. It was powered by a 100 hp (75 kW) Oberursel U.I nine cylinder rotary engine, mounted in the nose on steel bearings behind a firewall. This was a stand-in motor which would have been replaced by a lighter unit in production aircraft, so flight tests were conducted with the Oberursal throttled back to 60 hp (45 kW), the power for which the Dongó was designed. At the rear the empennage was conventional, with a very upright fin and deep, rounded rudder. The horizontal tail, mounted on top of the fuselage, had straight, swept leading edges and a semi-elliptical trailing edge form with separate elevators. All rear surfaces had relatively high aspect ratios, again to minimize drag. The Dongó had a fixed tailskid undercarriage, with mainwheels on half-axles hinged centrally from a transverse inverted-V strut and mounted just inside the wheels on two inverted V longitudinal struts. Its track was 1,700 mm (66.9 in); the wheels were placed 450 mm (17.7 in) ahead of the centre of gravity to minimize the risk of noseovers.

== Operational history ==
The date of the Dongó's first flight, made sometime during 1924, is not known exactly but by mid-December 1924 it had completed its tests in front of the official commission. It is not known if the Dongó ever received the intended lower powered engine, if the narrow wings met their design rigidity targets or if the "exceptionally good" maximum lift/drag ratio of about 16, remarkable for a fixed undercarriage biplane, was achieved. Despite its aerodynamic refinement it did not go into production and only one was built. Rotter's interest in high lift/drag designs later led him to gliders; his first design, the 1933 Karakan, had an aspect ratio of 19, only a little greater than that of the Dongó though a much greater structural challenge for a monoplane wing without the biplane's intrinsic braced girder strength. Flying it, Rotter became Hungary's first "Silver C" glider pilot.

== Specifications (test engine) ==
Data from Flight 22 January 1925, pp.39-40

General characteristics

- Crew: Instructor and pupil
- Length: 6.20 m (20 ft 4 in)
- Upper wingspan: 11.5 m (37 ft 9 in)
- Lower wingspan: 10.5 m (34 ft 5 in)
- Height: 2.95 m (9 ft 8 in)
- Wing area: 15.0 m^{2} (161 sq ft)
- Aspect ratio: upper wing, 16.9
- Empty weight: 450 kg (992 lb)
- Gross weight: 690 kg (1,521 lb)
- Powerplant: 1 × Oberursel U.I 9-cylinder rotary, 75 kW (100 hp) ; tests with engine throttled back to 60 hp (45 kW)
- Propellers: 2-bladed

Performance

- Maximum speed: 165 km/h (103 mph, 89 kn)
- Service ceiling: 4,000 m (13,000 ft)
- Time to altitude: 340 s to 1,000 m (3,281 ft)
- Lift-to-drag: 15-16 maximum
- Wing loading: 46 kg/m^{2} (9.4 lb/sq ft)
- Take-off speed: 75 km/h (47 mph)
