= Oberursel U.I =

1910s German piston aircraft engine

U.I
- Type: 9-cyl Rotary piston engine
- National origin: Germany
- Manufacturer: Motorenfabrik Oberursel
- Developed from: Gnome Delta

The Oberursel U.I was an early German aircraft engine that powered many German fighter aircraft in the first part of World War I. It was a 9-cylinder air-cooled rotary engine, a licence-built copy of the Gnome Delta that Oberursel was producing under licence before the war. It produced 75 kW (100 hp).

== Applications ==
- AGO DV.3
- Euler D.I
- Euler D.II
- Feiro Dongó
- Fokker D.II
- Fokker D.V
- Fokker E.II
- Fokker E.III
- Gotha LD 5
- Pfalz A.II
- Pfalz E.II
- Pfalz E.III
- Pfalz E.VI
- Siemens-Schuckert E.III

== Specifications ==
=== General characteristics ===
- Type: 9-cylinder counter rotary engine
- Bore: 124 mm (4.9 in)
- Stroke: 150 mm (5.9 in)
- Displacement: 16.3 L (990 cu in)
- Length: 45 in (1,150 mm)
- Diameter: 40 in (1,020 mm)
- Dry weight: 139.7 kg (308 lb)

=== Performance ===
- Power output: 73.6 kW (98.7 hp) até 1.200 rpm
- Compression ratio: 3.7:1
