= Fokker D.II =

German fighter biplane of World War I

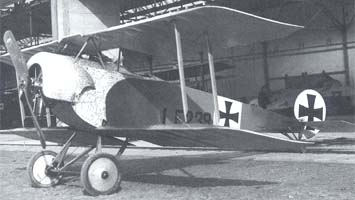

General information
- Type: Fighter
- Manufacturer: Fokker-Flugzeugwerke
- Designer: Martin Kreutzer

History
- First flight: December 1915

The Fokker D.II was a biplane fighter designed by the Fokker Aircraft Company (Fokker-Flugzeugwerke) during the First World War for the Imperial German Army's (Deutsches Heer) Imperial German Air Service (Fliegertruppen des deutschen Kaiserreiches) and the Imperial and Royal Aviation Troops (Kaiserliche und Königliche Luftfahrtruppen or K.u.K. Luftfahrtruppen) of the Austro-Hungarian Empire. Two prototypes designated by the factory as the M.17 were built in different configurations before the third one was accepted for production as the D.II. The Imperial German Air Service purchased 181 D.IIs, excluding the prototypes.

== Background and development ==
By late 1915 Anthony Fokker had become aware that his monoplane fighters like the E.III were outclassed by faster British and French biplanes and he began development of a series of biplanes. He preferred to use a light-weight rotary engine, but he wanted to evaluate the impact of using a heavier, more powerful water-cooled engine. He was uncertain about the relative advantages of single-seat vs two-seat fighter and so decide to develop prototypes that would demonstrate the virtues and disadvantages of each of the four configurations. All of these aircraft were armed with a fixed 7.92 mm (.312 in) lMG 08/15 machine gun operated by the pilot. The M.17 was his single-seat design with a air-cooled 80 hp (60 kW) rotary engine.

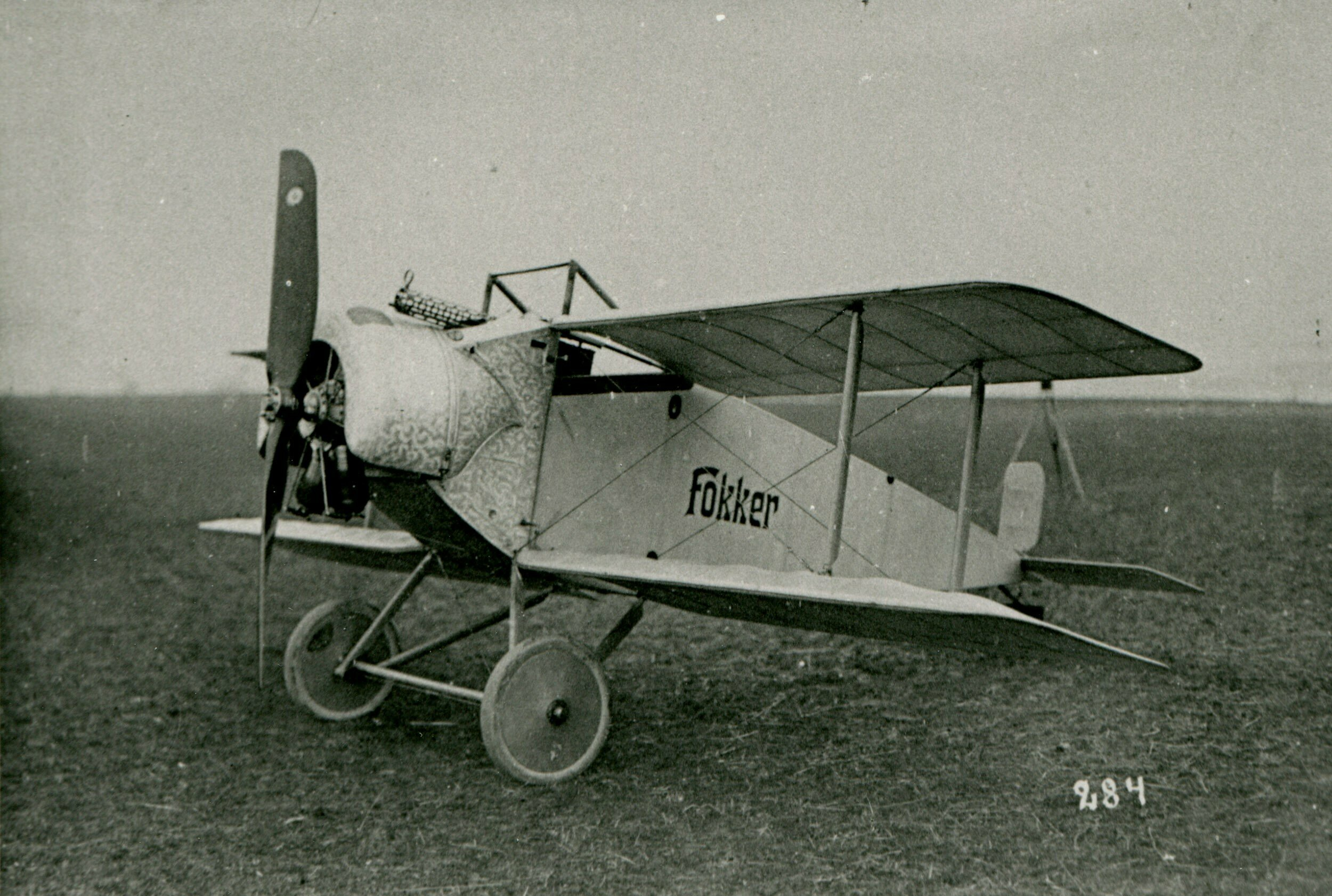
First M.17 prototype

The first prototype greatly resembled the first prototype of the M.16 with a fuselage that completely filled the space between the single-bay wings, but this also had the M.16's significant disadvantage of severely restricted visibility forward and downwards. The second prototype shared the single-bay wings with the earlier aircraft, but the fuselage was reduced in height so that the upper wing had to be supported on cabane struts to improve the pilot's view. Flight testing revealed that the fuselage was too short, the wingspan too great and the engine was too weak. The third prototype had a longer fuselage, slightly shorter wings and a more powerful 75 kW (100 hp) Oberursel U.I engine, with a new rudder. It was evaluated by the Imperial German Air Service in April 1916 and provisionally accepted for production as it was judged to be an improvement over the E.III. A contract for a dozen pre-production D.IIs was awarded in July and four batches for 169 production models were awarded through October.

== Operational history ==
The D.IIs were used by the home-defense Kampfeinsitzerkommandos and the early Jagdstaffeln but were quickly replaced when the new Albatros, Roland D.I and Roland D.II fighters came out in late 1916.

== Operators ==
Austro-Hungarian Empire

- Imperial and Royal Aviation Troops

German Empire

- Luftstreitkräfte

Switzerland

- Swiss Air Force

== Specifications (D.II) ==
Data from Fokker Aircraft of WWI: A Centennial Perspective on Great War Airplanes: Volume 1: Spinne – M.10 & Watercraft

General characteristics

- Crew: one pilot
- Length: 6.40 m (21 ft 0 in)
- Wingspan: 8.75 m (28 ft 9 in)
- Height: 2.55 m (8 ft 4 in)
- Wing area: 18.0 m^{2} (194 sq ft)
- Empty weight: 384 kg (847 lb)
- Gross weight: 575 kg (1,268 lb)
- Powerplant: 1 × Oberursel U.I rotary , 75 kW (100 hp)

Performance

- Maximum speed: 150 km/h (93 mph, 81 kn)
- Range: 200 km (124 mi, 108 nmi)
- Service ceiling: 4,000 m (13,125 ft)
- Rate of climb: 4.2 m/s (820 ft/min)
- Wing loading: 31.0 kg/m^{2} (6.3 lb/sq ft)

Armament

- 1 × fixed, forward-firing 7.92 mm (.312 in) lMG 08 machine gun
