= Anzani =

UK automobile manufacturer

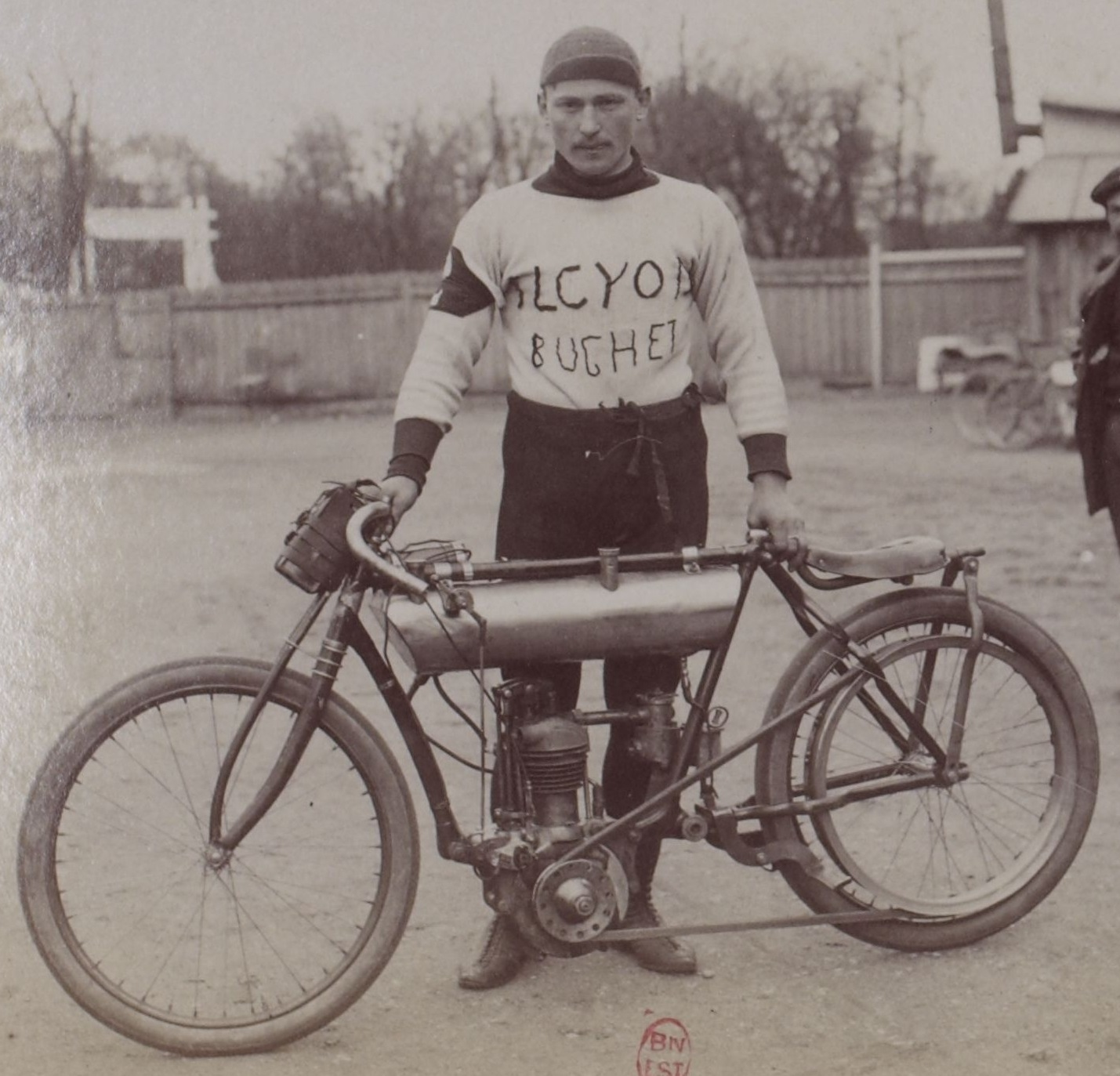
Alessandro Anzani in 1905.

Anzani was an engine manufacturer founded by the Italian Alessandro Anzani (1877–1956), which produced engines for aircraft, cars, boats, and motorcycles in factories in Britain, France and Italy.

== Overview ==
From his native Italy, Anzani moved to France where he became involved in cycle racing. He moved on to motorcycles and designed and built a record-breaking lightweight engine. In 1907, he set up a small workshop in Paris with three staff and while they were building his engines, he designed a hydrofoil powered by one of his engines and propellers.

== Aircraft engines ==
He supplied one of his engines to Enrico Forlanini and developed it further into a three-cylinder, air-cooled radial engine ideal for aeroplanes. One of the early engines, the 25 hp Anzani W-3 or Fan type, was supplied to Louis Blériot who used it on his successful first aeroplane crossing of the English Channel in 1909.

=== Types ===
- Anzani 3-cyl. Fan 10-12 hp 3.35" × 3.35"
- Anzani 3-cyl. Fan 12-15 hp 3.35" × 3.94"
- Anzani 3-cyl. Fan 25-30 hp 4.13" × 5.12"
- Anzani 3-cyl. Fan 30-35 hp 4.73" × 5.12"
- Anzani 3-cyl. Fan 40-45 hp 5.32" × 5.92"
- Anzani 3-cyl. Fan 45-50 hp
- Anzani 3-cyl. Y (Radial) 30hp
- Anzani 4-cyl. V 30-35 hp (water-cooled) 35 hp at 1,600 rpm
- Anzani 4-cyl. V 60-70 hp (water-cooled)
- Anzani 5-cyl. Radial 45hp
- Anzani 5-cyl. Radial 60hp
- Anzani 6-cyl. Radial 45hp at 1,300 rpm
- Anzani 6-cyl. Radial 70hp
- Anzani 7-cyl. Radial 95hp
- Anzani 10-cyl. Radial 100hp
- Anzani 14-cyl. Radial 160hp
- Anzani 20-cyl. Radial 200hp

== New factories ==
Demand for the engines continued to grow and the original Paris workshop was replaced by a new factory at Courbevoie, Paris, and one in London was also added as well as licensed production by other makers. Another factory at Monza, Italy was added in 1914.

== Motor racing ==
In 1920, Anzani turned to motor racing and built a small car with one of his 750 cc two-cylinder engines, air-cooled of course, which won several competitions. They also made a 1098 cc cyclecar between 1923 and 1924, as used in the T.B. Sports cyclecar.

== Sale of factories ==
On his 50th birthday in 1927, Anzani decided to sell his factories in Paris and London, keeping only the Monza works for sentimental reasons, and managed by Natale Baccanti.

== British Anzani ==
In the UK, British Anzani outsourced the manufacture of their engines to Coventry Ordnance Works Ltd. In the 1920s, it was refinanced as British Vulpine Engine Company, and then again as British Anzani Engineering Company, concentrating on small engines and car and motorcycle powerplants. They supplied AC Cars with the 1496cc side-valve four-cylinder (that would become AC's famous 2-litre motor), Frazer-Nash with a 1496cc side valve engine, (latterly supercharged) Morgan Motor Company with a V-twin, and Squire with the R1 twin cam engine. Berkeley Cars used small Anzani motorcycle engines in some models. British Anzani's best known products were motorcycle, lawnmower and outboard engines. Cotton, Tandon and Greeves motorcycles used Anzani motors.

In later years, the company diversified. In the years after World War II, the company's main product was the 'Iron Horse' - a two-wheeled pedestrian-controlled ploughing engine and light tractor. In time, four-wheeled versions with the driver sitting on the front of the vehicle were produced. The company became the British Anzani Group, and was trading under that name when it went into liquidation in 1980.

The trademark 'British Anzani' was re-registered in 2003 and the company, Anzani Ltd, in 2006. The company is supplying classic spares through Dolphin Engines of Launceston (Cornwall, UK) and is planning a return to the automotive, marine and transport industries, with products designed by Bo Zolland.
