= Anzani 20 =

1910s French aircraft piston engine

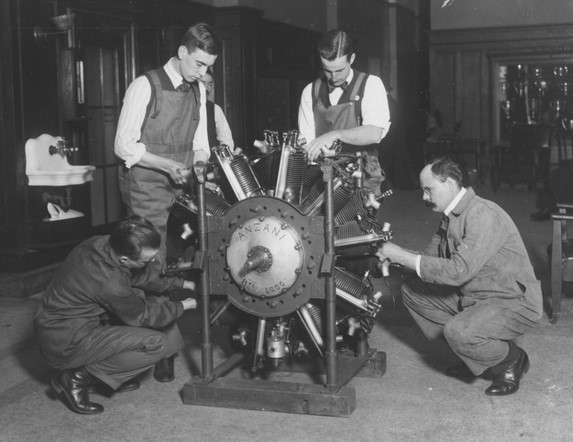
- Type: 4-row 20-cylinder air cooled radial
- National origin: France
- Manufacturer: Anzani
- First run: 1913

The 1913 20-cylinder Anzani air-cooled radial engine was the first four row radial and one of the most powerful engines of its period, though few were used.

== Development ==
By 1912 Anzani had built the world's first two row radial engine, the 10 cylinder Anzani 10, which came in two sizes, the bigger 12.1 litre one producing 100-110 hp. By the middle of 1913 the company had a double version with four rows of five cylinders, rated at 200 hp called the Anzani 20. This was displayed at the Paris show of that year and had much in common with the ten cylinder engine. An air-cooled engine, its cylinders were made of cast iron, with integral cooling fins. The pistons and their rings were also cast iron, machined inside and out. Conical seats for the inlet and exhaust valves were ground into the flat cylinder head, the nickel steel valves being of the poppet type. The automatic, atmospheric pressure operated inlet valves of the earliest Anzani engines were retained, but, as in other later Anzanis the exhaust valves were push-rod and rocker operated.

The aluminium crankcase was made in three parts, a drum and two end plates, bolted together and the cylinders were fixed to it by long bolts from the cylinder heads which joined other bolts through the crankcase. As with Anzani's other multi-row engines there was significant overlap between the rows in order to bring the big ends close together along the crankshaft. The hollow crankshaft was of nickel steel and mounted in ball bearings. It had a pair of crankpins set 180^{o} apart, one for each group of ten cylinders front and back. Lubricating oil was pumped through the crankshaft and then distributed by centrifugal force; there were two oil pumps, one for each "half" of the engine. There were two crankcase mixing chambers, each fed from its own carburettor and distributed by inlet manifolds on the two outer faces of the engine. Each half also had its own magneto, running at 3,000 rpm. The inlet manifold position resulted in the exhaust valves being close to the engine centre line, exiting via short Y-shaped tubes.

== Applications ==
- Caudron Type K

== Specifications ==
Data from Flight

=== General characteristics ===
- Type: 4-row 20-cylinder air-cooled radial
- Bore: 105 mm (4.13 in)
- Stroke: 140 mm (5.51 in)
- Displacement: 24.25 litre (1,476 cu in)
- Dry weight: 259 kg (572 lb)
- Designer: Alessander Anzani

=== Components ===
- Valvetrain: automatic inlet valves; exhaust valves operated by rockers and push rods driven by two pairs of cams in the crankcase for each half engine
- Fuel system: two Zenith carburettors and two crankcase mixing chambers, one pair for each half engine
- Reduction gear: none
- Ignition: two Gilbaud magnetos running at 3,000 rpm; one plug/cylinder

=== Performance ===
- Power output: 150 kW (200 hp) at 1,200 rpm
- Specific fuel consumption: 0.30 kg/kW/hr (0.49 lb/hp/hr)
- Oil consumption: (max) 0.06 kg/kW/hr (0.10 lb/hp/hr)
- Power-to-weight ratio: 0.56 kW/kg (0.35 hp/lb)

== See also ==
Related lists

- List of aircraft engines
