= Gnome et Rhône =

Defunct French aircraft engine manufacturer

Société des Moteurs Gnome et Rhône
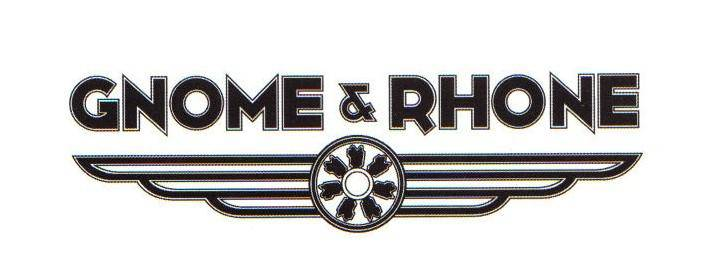
- Industry: Aerospace engineering, motorcycles
- Founded: 12 January 1915
- Defunct: 29 May 1945
- Fate: Nationalized
- Successor: Snecma
- Headquarters: Paris, France
- Products: Aircraft engines, motorcycles

Gnome et Rhône was a major French aircraft engine manufacturer. Between 1914 and 1918 they produced 25,000 of their 9-cylinder Delta and Le Rhône 110 hp (81 kW) rotary designs, while another 75,000 were produced by various licensees. These engines powered the majority of aircraft in the first half of the war, both Allied designs as well as German examples produced by Motorenfabrik Oberursel.

In the post-war era they started a new design series originally based on the Bristol Jupiter, but evolving into the excellent twin-row, 1,000 hp-class (750 kW) Gnome-Rhône 14K Mistral Major radial, which was likewise licensed and used around the world during World War II. They were a major supplier of engines to the German Luftwaffe, producing both their own designs as well as German ones under licence. Their factories were the target of highly accurate bombing, knocking them out of the war.

The company was nationalized as a part of Snecma in 1945, but the brand lived on for a time as the manufacturer of Gnome et Rhône motorcycles and Gnome et Rhône bicycles.

== Early history and World War I ==
=== Gnome ===
In 1895 the 26-year-old French engineer Louis Seguin bought a license for the Gnom gas engine from the German firm Motorenfabrik Oberursel. Sold under the French translation, the Gnome was a single-cylinder stationary engine of about 4 hp (3 kW) that ran on kerosene (known in the UK and South Africa as paraffin) intended to be used in industrial applications. The Gnome used a unique valve system with only one rod-operated exhaust valve, and a "hidden" intake valve located on the piston head.

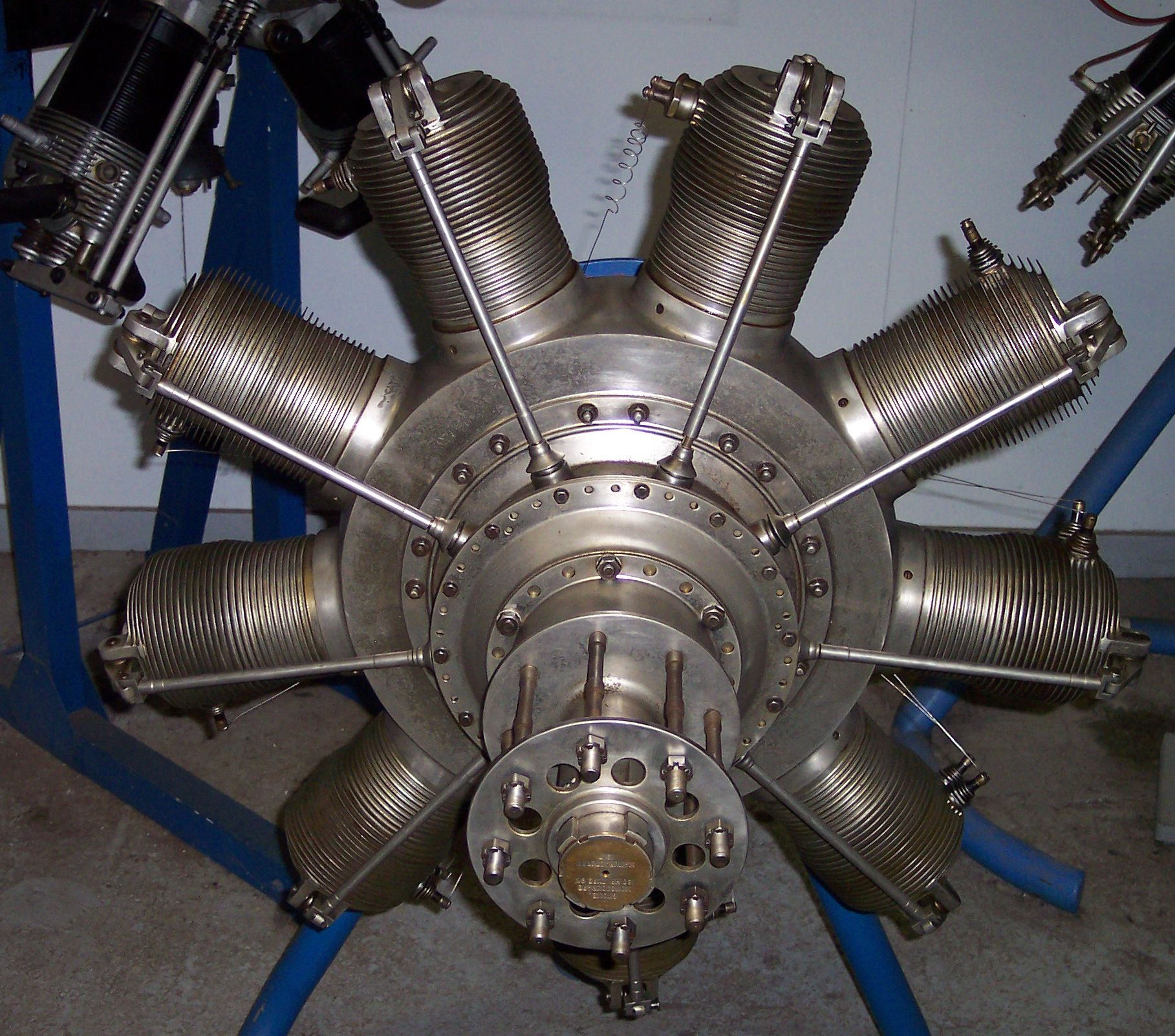
160 hp Gnome 9N Monosoupape of 1917

On 6 June 1905 Louis Seguin and his brother Laurent formed the Société Des Moteurs Gnome (the Gnome Motor Company) to produce automobile engines. They soon started development of one of the first purpose-designed aircraft engines, combining several Gnome cylinders into a rotary engine. The design emerged in the spring of 1909 as the 7-cylinder rotary Gnome Omega, delivering 50 hp (37 kW) from 75 kg. More than 1,700 of these engines would be built in France, along with license-built models in Germany, Sweden, Britain, the United States, and Russia. The Gnome powered Henry Farman's Farman III aircraft, which set world records for distance and endurance; the first aircraft to break 100 km/h; and in 1910 the Fabre Hydravion, the first seaplane ever to fly. It helped France become the leading country in aviation at the time. Léon Lemartin and Jules Védrines were two young engineers who participated in the design, development, and implementation of the Omega, and in the milieu of the pioneering days of flight they both went on to become successful pilots.

All of the Gnomes were known for their unique solutions to getting fuel to the top of the piston without using piping. Early models used two valves, one in the cylinder head and a second embedded in the piston itself, counterweighted to open at the end of the stroke. Without any springs or pushrods, the valve would pop open on the downstroke, allowing fuel to be drawn into the cylinder from the crankcase area. Unfortunately this design was very difficult to service, requiring the cylinder to be disassembled. To improve reliability and maintenance, later models used the Monosoupape (single-valve) system instead, using a single exhaust valve at the top of the cylinder and using a series of ports to allow the fuel mixture into the top of the cylinder when the piston had moved down in the cylinder past the ports.

The basic Gnome design was then delivered in a series of larger engines. The Gnome Lambda of 1911 was a larger 80 hp (60 kW) version of the Omega, followed by the 9-cylinder 100 hp (75 kW) Gnome Delta in 1914 (also called the Gnome Monosoupape as it used that type of engine design for the first time). Gnome also tried a 14-cylinder two-row version, the Double Lambda of 160 hp (120 kW), but this saw little use, even though it was copied by Oberursel as the U.III in Germany, and used in a few early Fokker fighter designs without success. To deliver more power with the advent of high-power inline engines late in the war, a completely new nine-cylinder Monosoupape design was delivered in 1918 as the Type-N, delivering 160 hp. This design saw use on the little-known but excellent Nieuport 28.

=== Le Rhône ===
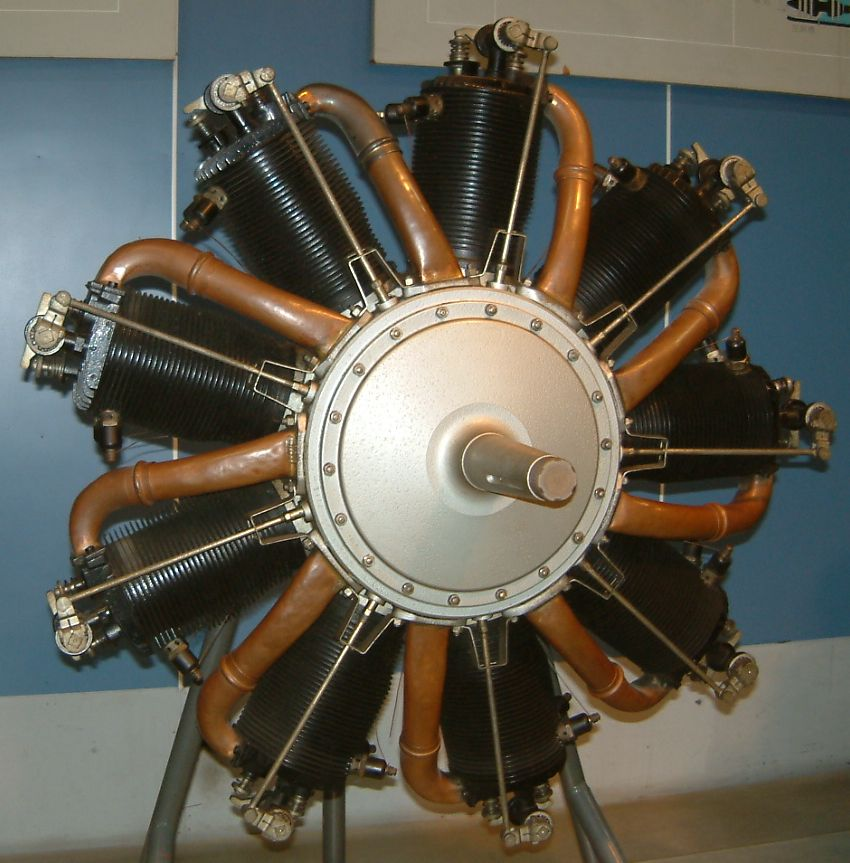
80 hp Le Rhône 9C rotary engine

Another French engineer, Louis Verdet, designed his own small rotary engine in 1910 which did not see much use. In 1912 he delivered a larger 7-cylinder design, the 7C, which developed 70 hp from 90 kg. This proved much more popular and he formed Société des Moteurs Le Rhône later that year. He soon followed the 7C with the larger Le Rhône 9C, a nine-cylinder design delivering 80 hp (60 kW). Compared to the Gnome's, the Le Rhône was considerably more "conventional", using copper intake manifold pipes to bring the fuel to the top of each engine cylinder, along with intake and exhaust valves. Like Gnome, the Le Rhône designs were widely licensed, in this case the 110 hp Le Rhone 9J was produced in Germany by Oberursel as their Ur.II model as designated by IdFlieg, and in the United States; the Union Switch & Signal Company of Swissvale, PA was reported to have produced some 10,000 units - it was also built in Austria, Britain and Sweden.

=== Gnome et Rhône ===
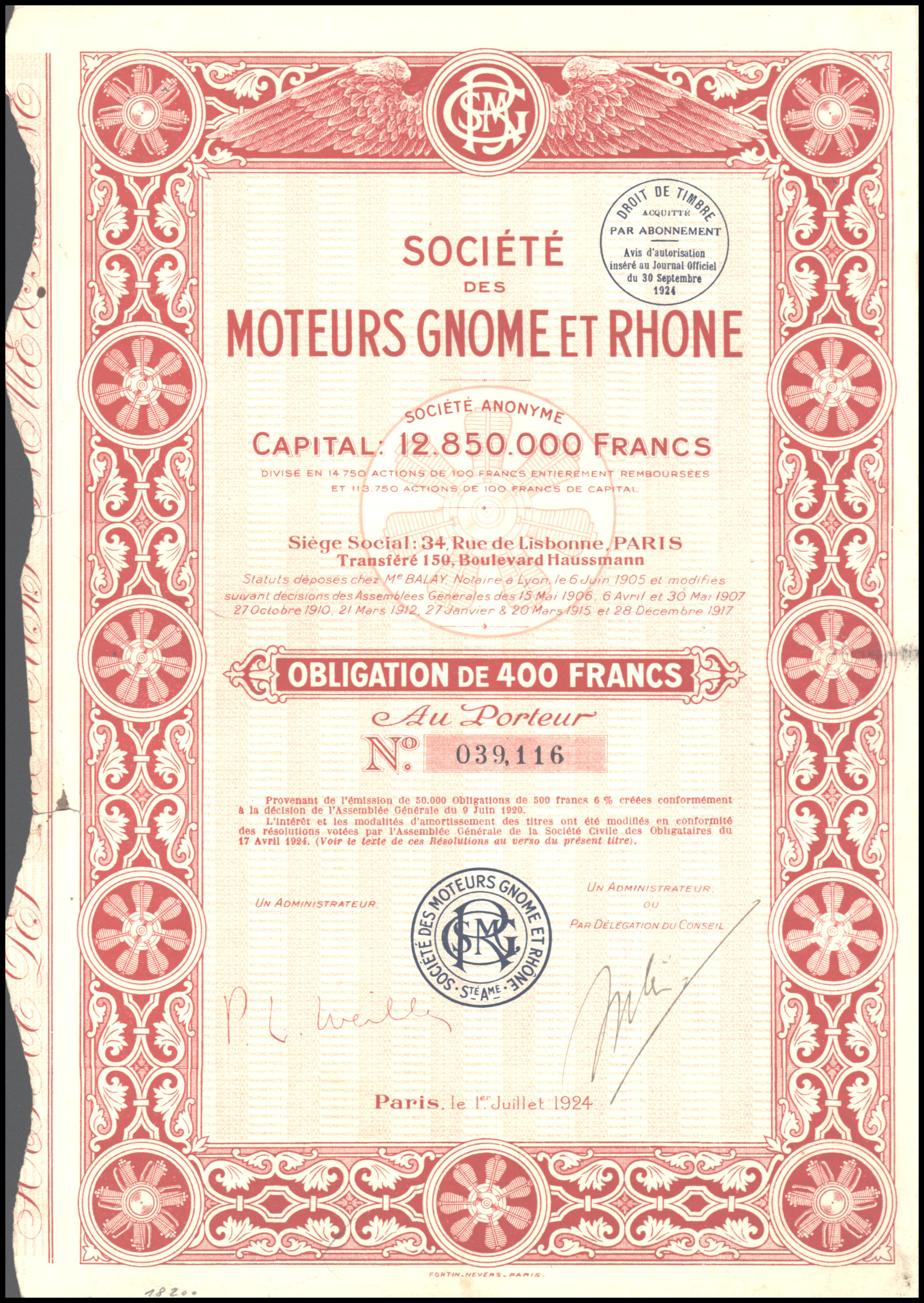
Bond of the Société des Moteurs Gnome et Rhône, issued 1. July 1924

After several years of fierce competition, Gnome and Le Rhône began negotiating a merger in 1914, and on 12 January 1915 Gnome bought out Le Rhône to form Société des Moteurs Gnome et Rhône.

Developments of the 9C became their primary product, improving in power to about 97 kW (130 hp) in the 1917 Le Rhône 9Jby, and 130 kW (170 hp) in the related but less commonly used 9R. The ultimate development was the 250 kW (340 hp) double row Le Rhône 18E of 1917 based on 9R components, however like all multi-row rotaries, it suffered from unresolvable cooling problems and was never used operationally.

The Gnome rotaries started becoming less common on front line aircraft after 1916 as power advances failed to keep pace with either liquid-cooled V-8 engines, or even the more advanced conventionally valved rotaries, such as the 104 kW (139 hp) Clerget 9Bf, and they peaked with the 120 kW (160 hp) Monosoupape 9N, however they remained popular for training aircraft.

The 9C and 9J were the most commonly used engines for early and mid-war designs both in French and British service and was also used for fighters in Germany where Oberursel had taken out a license just before the war. The majority of German aircraft however used six cylinder stationary inline engines. Oberursel engines based on the Gnome were prefixed with a U, while those based on the Le Rhône a Ur.

== The Inter-War years ==
With the end of the war the company rapidly diversified, using their factories to produce chassis and engines for the Rolland-Pilain and Piccard-Pictet cars, along with Ansaldo diesel engines, refrigerators, sewing machines and even jackhammers. In 1920 they also introduced their first motorcycle, simply known as the Gnome et Rhône 500 cc. Various models were produced up to the early 1950s, typically advertised as simply "Gnome Rhone" with no accents.

By 1920 their rotary engines were no longer competitive, and they had no new designs of their own. In 1921 they took out a license for the Bristol Jupiter, which was in the process of becoming the Gnome of its era. In 1922, Paul-Louis Weiller, a World War I ace, took over the company and decided to focus it on aircraft engines once again. Their Jupiter designs, the 9A, were soon selling very well. In 1926 they took out a license for the smaller 5-cylinder Bristol Titan, while Bristol licensed the Farman-style reduction gearing used by Gnome.

Not satisfied to simply produce Bristol designs under license, Gnome started a major design effort based around the mechanicals of the Titan. The results were introduced in 1927 as the K-series, spanning the 260 hp (190 kW) Gnome-Rhône 5K Titan, the 7-cylinder 370 hp (270 kW) version, the Gnome-Rhône 7K Titan Major, and the 9-cylinder 550 hp (405 kW) Gnome-Rhône 9K Mistral. All of these engines were delivered in a variety of improved versions, named with a three letter code; the first letter was the series number (a through f for instance), the second a r or l depending on which direction the engine turned, and the third indicating the charging system. With the introduction of the K-series, Gnome ended royalty payments to Bristol. By 1930 they had delivered 6,000 Jupiters, Mistrals and Titans, making them the largest engine company in France.

But the 550 hp (405 kW) Mistral was no longer powerful enough for the rapidly evolving industry. To provide more power Gnome once again turned to the two-row solution, using two banks of 7 cylinders, delivering the 625 hp (460 kW) Gnome-Rhône 14K Mistral Major in 1929. The new engine was an instant hit. By 1933 the 14Kfrs had improved the power to 1,025 hp (750 kW) through better supercharging (along with similar improvements in the Mistral, now at 770 hp or 570 kW), and the engine was once again being licensed around the world.

Leaving the idea of having many engines in a single "K-series", Gnome continued work with the basic mechanical design to produce the 18-cylinder two-row Gnome-Rhône 18L of 1400 hp (1030 kW). Its power-to-weight ratio was not very good and work on the design was eventually stopped in 1939. A smaller engine, the Gnome-Rhône 14M Mars was introduced to replace the earlier K-series Mistral, notable primarily for its extremely compact frontal area, giving by far the most power for size of any engine of the era. It was especially used in the Potez 631 aircraft family.

In 1936 the 14K-series was replaced by the Gnome-Rhône 14N delivering 1,100 hp (810 kW) from a slightly heavier engine that nevertheless had a much better power-to-weight ratio. Starting with the N they introduced a new naming scheme, replacing the earlier model letters with numbers, delivering the engine in versions that turned left with even numbers and right with odd. The original 14N-0/1 was run through a number of versions, the 14N-10/11 being used on the Bloch MB.210 bomber, the 14N-25 on early examples of the MB.152 fighter, and the 14N-49 on late MB.152s as well as LeO 451s and Amiot 351s. The N-series finally ended with the 14N-50/51, which delivered 1,210 hp (890 kW) for takeoff. The 14N was not as widely licensed, as the war was approaching and the French government was becoming increasingly wary of licensing designs to potential enemies.

The 14N-series was itself replaced by the ultimate pre-war evolution of the line, the Gnome-Rhône 14R. The first versions introduced in 1939, the 14R-4/5, produced 1,291 hp (950 kW) for takeoff and was only slightly heavier than the 14N. By 1940 the improved 14R-8/9 was delivering 1,578 hp (1,161 kW) by increasing RPM from 2,400 to 2,600. Although this was a good figure for the era, British and German design had already passed this mark, and would soon be pressing on 2,000 hp (1,500 kW).

With the fall of France in 1940, Gnome et Rhône was ordered to produce the BMW 801 under license, while the 14M and 14N saw limited use on some German designs, such as the Henschel Hs 129B, Gotha Go 244B, and Messerschmitt Me 323. The company became infamous for slow production, building only 8,500 engines by May 1944, when the Germans had been estimating 25,000. An air raid by 56 Lancasters and 8 Mosquitos of 5 Group of the RAF completely destroyed the original Gennevilliers factories on 9/10 May. Another air raid by Lancasters of 617 Squadron led by Wing Commander Leonard Cheshire had also severely damaged the Limoges factory on 8/9 February 1944.

With the end of the war, the company was in no condition to continue in the aero-engine business, although they picked up small contracts to produce M4 Sherman tanks for the French army. In order to save what was left the company was nationalized on 29 May 1945, creating the Société Nationale d'Etude et de Construction de Moteurs d'Aviation (SNECMA), and producing the 14N, 14R and the new 14U.

== Licensed versions and developments ==
The 14K was one of the most popular engines of its era, widely licensed and used around the world. In Poland it was used for export fighter variants, most notable PZL P.24. In particular it was used in Romania, where it powered a number of Polish designed PZL fighters before finally becoming the main engine of the IAR 80 fighter. In Yugoslavia the 7K, 9K and 14N-0 were built by Industrija motora Rakovica.

Isotta Fraschini and Piaggio of Italy both took out licenses, the former producing the K.14, the latter the P.XI. These were used on a number of designs in the pre-war period, many of which were exported. This led to Manfred Weiss taking out a license in Hungary, producing it as the WM K-14 in order to power their versions of the Reggiane Re.2000 fighter called the MAVAG Heja "Hawk", as well as the Weiss WM 21 Sólyom.

The British firm Alvis had licensed the 14K and 18L, but neither entered production before the war ended. Nevertheless, Alvis pressed ahead with development, releasing the 9-cylinder Alvis 501 Leonides and later the 14-cylinder Alvis 701 Leonides Major. The latter saw some use on post-war helicopter designs.

The Soviet Union, through its Tumansky OKB design bureau, license-built the 14K (as the M-85), building nearly 500 examples.

== Engines ==
=== World War I ===
==== Gnome ====
- Gnome Ω50 Omega (a.k.a. 50 hp)
- Gnome Λ80 Lambda (a.k.a. 80 hp)
- Gnome Δ100 Delta (a.k.a. 100 hp)
- Gnome Σ60 Sigma (a.k.a. 60 hp)
- Gnome ΩΩ100 Omega Omega (a.k.a. 100 hp)
- Gnome ΛΛ160 Lambda-Lambda (a.k.a. 160 hp)
- Gnome ΔΔ200 Delta Delta (a.k.a. 200 hp)
- Gnome Monosoupape
  - Gnome Monosoupape 7 Type A:(1916) 80 hp (60 kW)
  - Gnome Monosoupape 9 Type B-2:(1916) 100 hp (75 kW)
  - Gnome Monosoupape 9 Type N:(1917) 150 or 160 hp (112 or 119 kW)

==== Le Rhône ====
- Le Rhône 7B - 50 hp Le Rhône
- Le Rhône 9C - 80 hp Le Rhône
- Le Rhône 9J - 110 hp Le Rhône
- Le Rhône 9JB - 120 hp Le Rhône
- Le Rhône 9L - 130 hp Le Rhône
- Le Rhône 9M - 200 hp Le Rhône
- Le Rhône 9R - 170 hp Le Rhône
- Le Rhône 9Z - 60 hp Le Rhône
- Le Rhône 28E - 320 hp Le Rhône

=== Between wars ===
- Gnome-Rhône 5B Titan
- Gnome-Rhône 5K Titan
- Gnome-Rhône 7K Titan Major
- Gnome-Rhône 9A Jupiter
- Gnome-Rhône 9K Mistral
- Gnome-Rhône 14K Mistral Major
- Gnome-Rhône 14L
- Gnome-Rhône 14M
- Gnome-Rhône 18L

=== World War II ===
- Gnome-Rhône 14M Mars
- Gnome-Rhône 14N
- Gnome-Rhône 14R

== Motorcycles ==
From 1920 Gnome et Rhône diversified into the bicycle and motorcycle business producing some relatively successful and stylish products. They first organized the Société Française des Moteurs ABC in Paris in 1920, to build the Granville Bradshaw designed ABC motorcycle in 1920, which they produced until 1924. Bradshaw's original 400cc design was enlarged by Gnome et Rhone to 493cc, and approximately 3000 models were produced through 1924. The company then embarked on its own motorcycle designs, producing single-cylinder and flat-twin machines through WWII.

- 3CV Type Junior (250 cc (15.26 cu in))
- 4CV Major (500 cc (30.51 cu in))
- 4CV Super Major (500 cc (30.51 cu in))
- 5CV Type D.5 (500 cc (30.51 cu in))
- 5CV Type C.V.2 (500 cc (30.51 cu in))
- 5CV Type V.2 (500 cc (30.51 cu in))
- Type X (750 cc (45.77 cu in))

== See also ==
- List of aircraft engine manufacturers
- Rotary Engine - Gnome
