= Caudron J Marine =

Amphibious biplane

J Marine
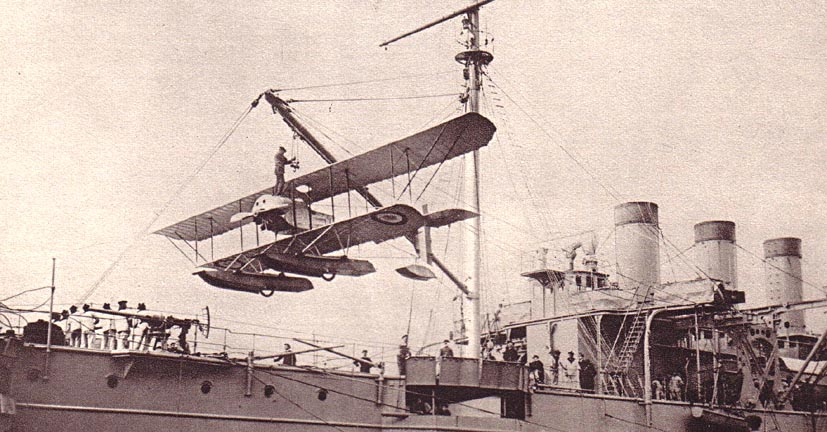
- Caudron Type J "Marine" seaplane being lifted on the Foudre in 1914

General information
- Type: Reconnaissance Amphibian
- Manufacturer: Caudron
- Designer: René Caudron
- Primary user: Marine Française
- Number built: 3

History
- First flight: 1914

The Caudron J Marine was an amphibious, two-seat biplane equipped with floats and wheels. It was similar to the earlier Caudron J floatplane.

== Design ==
The Caudron J was essentially a seaplane version of the two-seat Caudron G and single-seat Caudron F. The F, G, and J all followed a similar layout with 2½-bay biplane wings, a tail unit with a single fin and rudder, supported on struts attached to the wings at the first inter-plane struts and a central fuselage nacelle housing the cockpit and mounting the tractor engine. Two main floats were strut-supported under the wings and a small tail-float was attached to the tail unit. A 100 hp (75 kW) Anzani 10-cylinder radial engine powered the plane.

== Operational history ==
The French Navy (la Marine Française) used the three production Caudron J Marine aircraft for reconnaissance and artillery observation. On 8 May 1914, René Caudron flew the second example from a wooden platform erected over a gun turret, on the French Navy seaplane carrier Foudre. The first example was powered by a 100 hp (75 kW) Gnome 9 Delta rotary engine and the other two by 80 hp (60 kW) Gnome 7 Lambda rotary engines.

== Variants ==
Caudron J
The initial 1913 version of the Caudron floatplane with 15 m (49 ft) span and 100 hp (75 kW) Anzani 10-cyl radial. Winner of the Deauville contest in August 1913.
Caudron J Marine
1914 production version of the Type J, with three examples purchased by the French Navy

== Operators ==
France

- French Navy

== Specifications (variant specified) ==
Data from

General characteristics

- Crew: 2, pilot and observer
- Length: 8.05 m (26 ft 5 in)
- Wingspan: 14.7 m (48 ft 3 in)
- Wing area: 40 m^{2} (430 sq ft)
- Empty weight: 510 kg (1,124 lb)
- Gross weight: 730 kg (1,609 lb)
- Powerplant: 1 × Le Rhône 9C 9-cylinder air-cooled rotary piston engine, 60 kW (80 hp)
- Propellers: 2-bladed wooden fixed-pitch propeller

Performance

- Maximum speed: 95 km/h (59 mph, 51 kn)
