= Clerget 7Z =

World War I–era rotary aircraft engine

7Z
- Type: Rotary engine
- National origin: France
- Manufacturer: Clerget-Blin
- First run: 1913
- Major applications: Avro 504
- Number built: 600 (French production); 347 (British production)
- Developed from: Clerget 7Y

The Clerget 7Z was a seven-cylinder rotary aircraft engine of the World War I era designed by Pierre Clerget. First appearing in 1913 it was nominally rated at 80 horsepower (60 kW). In addition to the 600 engines built in France by Clerget-Blin, 347 examples were built under license in Britain by Gordon Watney & Co Ltd of Weybridge and Gwynnes Limited of Hammersmith.

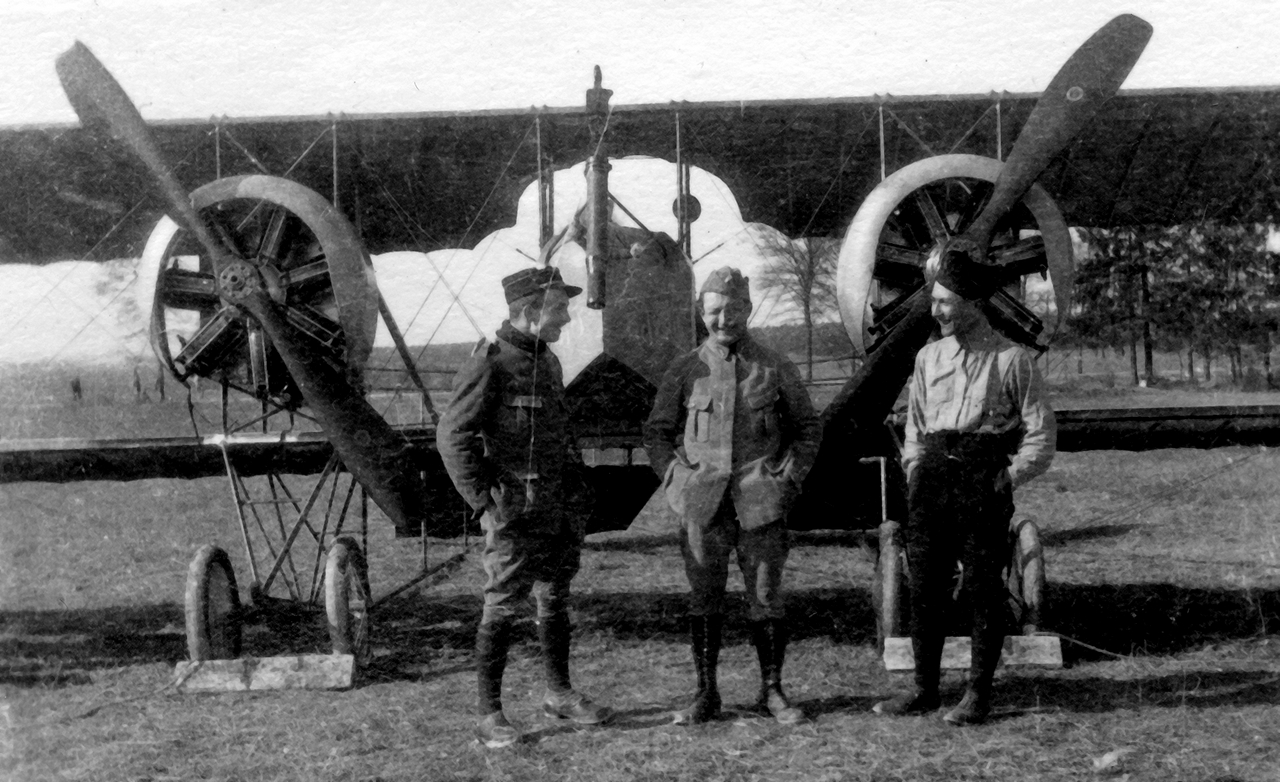
A French twin engine Caudron G4 fitted with Clerget rotary engines

== Applications ==
- Avro 504
- Beardmore W.B.III
- Bristol S.S.A.
- Caudron G.4
- Mosca-Bystritsky MBbis
- Royal Aircraft Factory B.E.8a
- Royal Aircraft Factory S.E.2
- Royal Aircraft Factory S.E.4
- Sopwith Pup
- Weymann W-1

== Specifications (Clerget 7Z) ==
Data from Lumsden and Gunston.

=== General characteristics ===
- Type: Seven-cylinder air-cooled rotary engine
- Bore: 120 mm (4.72 in)
- Stroke: 150 mm (5.91 in)
- Displacement: 11.88 L (724.96 cu in)
- Diameter: 914 mm (35.98 in)
- Dry weight: 106 kg (234 lb)

=== Components ===
- Valvetrain: 1 each overhead inlet and exhaust valves operated by pushrods and rockers
- Fuel system: Bloctube carburettor
- Fuel type: Gasoline with Castor oil lubricant
- Oil system: Castor oil mixed with fuel
- Cooling system: Air-cooled

=== Performance ===
- Power output: 70.84 kW (95 hp) at 1,300 rpm (maximum power)
- Specific power: 0.1314 hp/cu in (5.98 kW/L)
- Compression ratio: 4.3:1
- Specific fuel consumption: 0.564 L/kW/hour(0.74 pt/hp/hour)
- Oil consumption: 0.0762 L/kW/hour (0.1 pt/hp/hour)
- Power-to-weight ratio: 0.67 kW/kg (0.406 hp/lb)

== See also ==
- Clerget aircraft engines

Comparable engines

- Gnome Omega
- Gnome Lambda
- Anzani 10-cylinder
- Le Rhône 9C

Related lists

- List of aircraft engines
