= Gnome Delta =

1900s French Aircraft Piston Engine

Delta
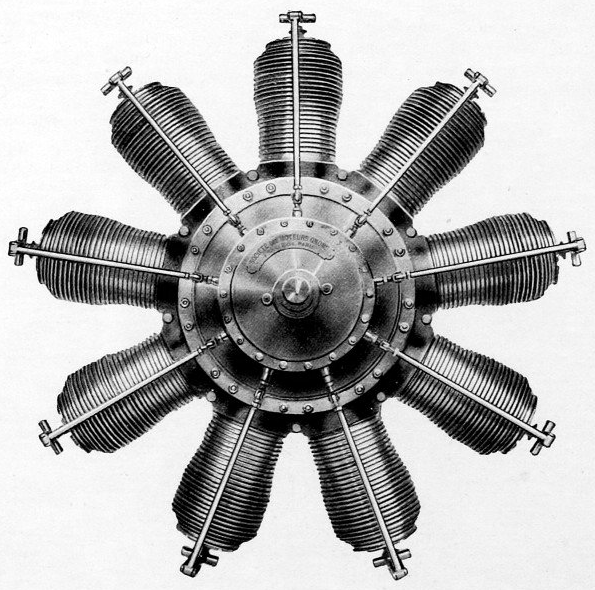
- Gnome 9 Delta as shown in a 1913 Gnome catalog
- Type: Rotary aero engine
- Manufacturer: Société des Moteurs Gnome
- First run: c. 1909
- Major applications: Avro 500; Vickers F.B.9 Gunbus
- Variants: Oberursel U.I

The Gnome 9 Delta was a French designed, nine-cylinder, air-cooled rotary aero engine that was produced under license in Britain. Powering several World War I era aircraft types it produced 100 hp (75 kW) from its capacity of 16 litres (980 cu in).

== Variants ==
Delta
The baseline 9-cylinder 100 hp (75 kW) rotary engine.
Delta-Delta
An 18-cylinder 200 hp (150 kW) two-row rotary engine - Two Deltas on a common crankshaft.

== Applications ==
List from Lumsden

- Avro Type 500
- Caudron Type L
- Dreadnought No.1
- Pemberton-Billing P.B.25
- Royal Aircraft Factory S.E.2
- Vickers No.7 Monoplane
- Vickers F.B.9 Gunbus

== Engines on display ==
- A preserved Gnome 9 Delta engine is on public display at the Musée des Arts et Métiers, Paris

== Specifications (9 Delta) ==
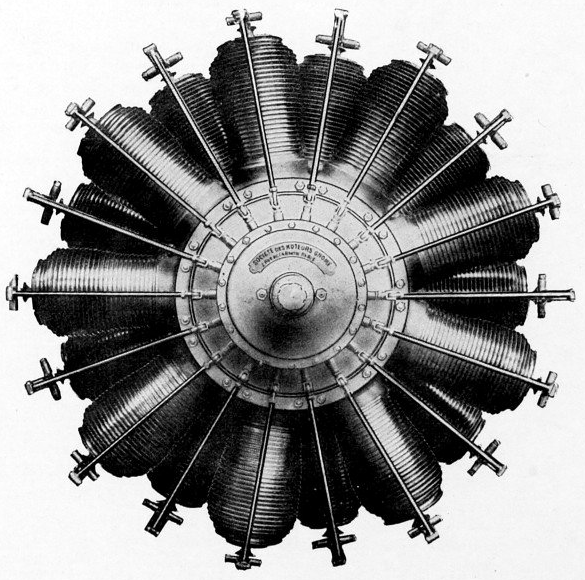
Gnome 18 Delta-Delta from the 1913 Gnome catalog

Data from Lumsden.

=== General characteristics ===
- Type: 9-cylinder, single-row, rotary engine
- Bore: 124 mm (4.88 in)
- Stroke: 150 mm (5.91 in)
- Displacement: 16.28 L (993.47 cu in)
- Length: 1,150 mm (45.28 in)
- Diameter: 1,020 mm (40.16 in)
- Dry weight: 135 kg (297.6 lb)

=== Components ===
- Valvetrain: Automatic centre-piston inlet valve, one overhead exhaust valve per cylinder.
- Fuel system: one static Bloctube carburettor feeding the crankcase
- Fuel type: 40 / 50 Octane gasoline
- Oil system: Total loss pressure fed
- Cooling system: Air-cooled

=== Performance ===
- Power output: 75 kW (100 hp) at 1,200 rpm
- Specific fuel consumption: 362 g/(kW·h) (0.6 lb/(hp·h))

== See also ==
Comparable engines

- Bentley BR1
- Clerget
- Le Rhône 9C

Related lists

- List of aircraft engines
