= LVG E.I =

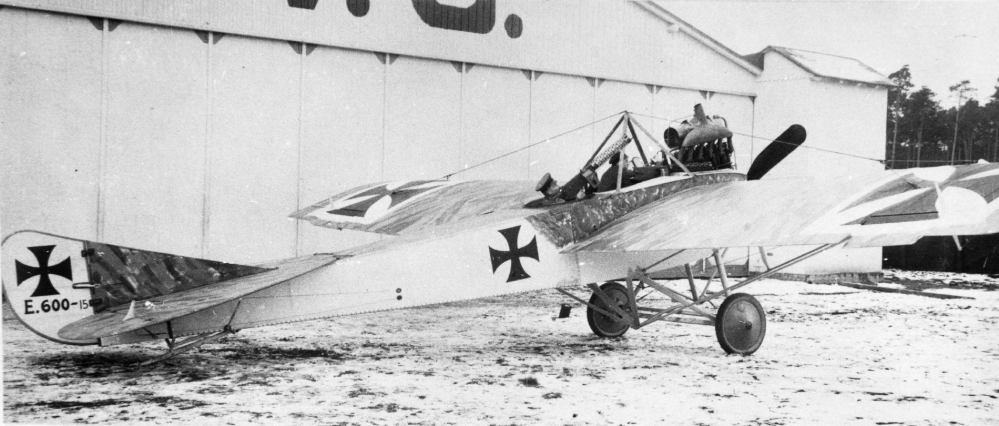
- LVG E.I prototype serial E.600/15.

General information
- Type: Fighter aircraft
- Manufacturer: LVG (Luft-Verkehrs-Gesellschaft)
- Designer: Franz Schneider
- Primary user: Luftstreitkräfte
- Number built: 1

History
- First flight: 1915

The LVG E.I was a German two-seat monoplane of World War I. The E.I was unusual among monoplanes of its time in that it featured ailerons as opposed to the then-conventional (for monoplanes) wing warping.

It was fitted with both a rearward firing machine gun, mounted on a flexible ring mounting, and a forward firing synchronized machine gun and was very probably the first aircraft to be so armed.

The only prototype was destroyed on its way to the front for testing in 1915; as such, very little is known about the E.I, or its synchronization gear.

== List of operators ==
- German Empire

== Specifications ==
General characteristics

- Crew: 2
- Powerplant: 1 × Mercedes D.II 6-cylinder water-cooled in-line piston engine, 89 kW (119 hp)
- Propellers: 2-bladed fixed-pitch propeller

Performance Armament

- Guns: 1 × front mounted synchronised machine gun, 1 × rear mounted machine gun

== Bibliography ==
- Green, William & Swanborough, Gordon (2001) [1994]. The Complete Book of Fighters: An Illustrated Encyclopedia of Every Fighter Built and Flown (Revised and Updated ed.). London: Salamander Books. ISBN 1-84065-269-1.
- Herris, Jack (2016). LVG Aircraft of WWI: Volume 3: C.VI–C.XI & Fighters: A Centennial Perspective on Great War Airplanes. Great War Aviation Centennial Series. Vol. 36. Charleston, South Carolina: Aeronaut Books. ISBN 978-1-935881-74-2.
