= Synchronization gear =

Matching of warplane's gun and propeller

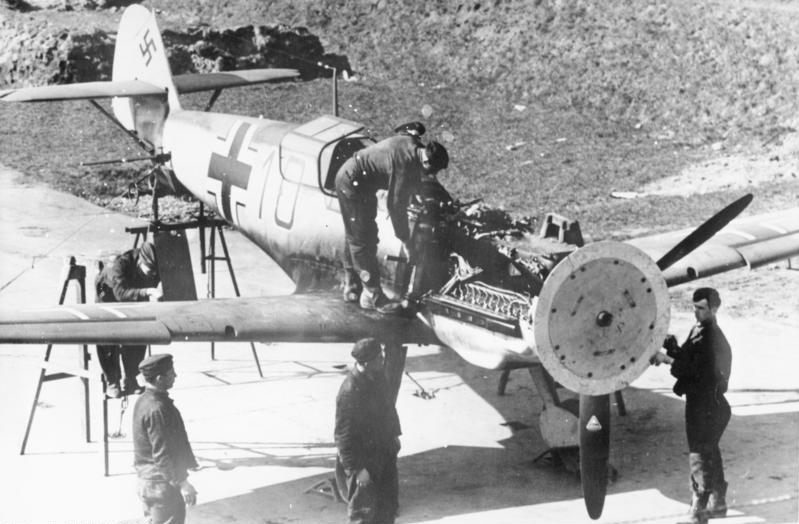
The synchronization gear of a Messerschmitt Bf 109E1 is adjusted (January 1941). A wooden disk attached to the propeller is used to indicate where each round passes through the propeller arc.

A synchronization gear (also known as a gun synchronizer or interrupter gear) was a device enabling a single-engine tractor-configuration aircraft to fire its forward-firing armament through the arc of its spinning propeller without bullets striking the blades. This allowed the aircraft, rather than the gun, to be aimed at the target.

There were many practical problems, mostly arising from the inherently imprecise nature of an automatic gun's firing, the great (and varying) velocity of the blades of a spinning propeller, and the very high speed at which any gear synchronizing the two had to operate. In practice, all known gears worked on the principle of actively triggering each shot, in the manner of a semi-automatic weapon.

Design and experimentation with gun synchronization had been underway in France and Germany in 1913–1914, following the ideas of August Euler, who seems to have been the first to suggest mounting a fixed armament firing in the direction of flight (in 1910). However, the first practical – if far from reliable – gear to enter operational service was that fitted to the Fokker Eindecker fighters, which entered squadron service with the German Air Service in mid-1915. The success of the Eindecker led to numerous gun synchronization devices, culminating in the reasonably reliable hydraulic Romanian Constantinesco gear of 1917. By the end of the First World War, German engineers were well on the way to perfecting a gear using an electrical rather than a mechanical or hydraulic link between the engine and the gun, with the gun triggered by an electro-mechanical solenoid.

From 1918 to the mid-1930s the standard armament for a fighter aircraft remained two synchronized rifle-calibre machine guns, firing forward through the arc of the propeller. In the late 1930s, however, the main role of the fighter was increasingly seen as the destruction of large, all-metal bombers, for which this armament was inadequate. Since it was impractical to fit more than two guns in the limited space available in the front of a single-engine aircraft's fuselage, guns began to be mounted in the wings instead, firing outside the arc of the propeller so not requiring synchronising. Synchronizing became unnecessary on all aircraft with the introduction of propellerless jet propulsion.

== Nomenclature ==
A mechanism that achieves the feat of firing between whirling blades of a propeller without striking them could be described as "interrupting" the fire of the gun (to the extent that it no longer actually works as an automatic weapon at all), and also as "synchronizing", or "timing", its fire to coincide with the revolutions of the propeller. These terms are more or less misleading, at least insofar as explaining what happens when the gear functions.

The term "interrupter" implies that the gear pauses, or interrupts, the fire of the gun at the point where one of the blades of the propeller passes in front of its muzzle. Even the relatively slowly revolving propellers of First World War aircraft, however, typically turned twice or even thrice for each shot a contemporary machine gun could fire. A two-bladed propeller could therefore obstruct the gun up to six times every firing cycle, a four-bladed one twelve times. A gun set up this way would be interrupted more than forty times per second, while firing at only around seven rounds per second. Unsurprisingly, designers of so-called interrupter gears found this too problematic to be seriously attempted, as the gaps between the interruptions would have been too short to allow the gun to fire at all.

True synchronization, though, with a machine gun's rate of fire exactly proportional to the rotational speed of an aircraft propeller, would require an impractical level of complexity. A machine gun normally fires at a fixed rate, and, while this may be changed by modifying the gun, it cannot be varied at will while the gun is operating. The rate of rotation of an aircraft propeller, meanwhile, especially before the advent of the constant-speed propeller, could vary widely depending on throttle setting and maneuvers being performed. Even if it had been feasible to pick a particular point on an aircraft engine's tachometer at which a machine gun's cyclic rate would permit it to fire through the propeller arc, this would be very limiting.

== Components ==
A typical synchronizing gear had three basic components.

=== At the propeller ===
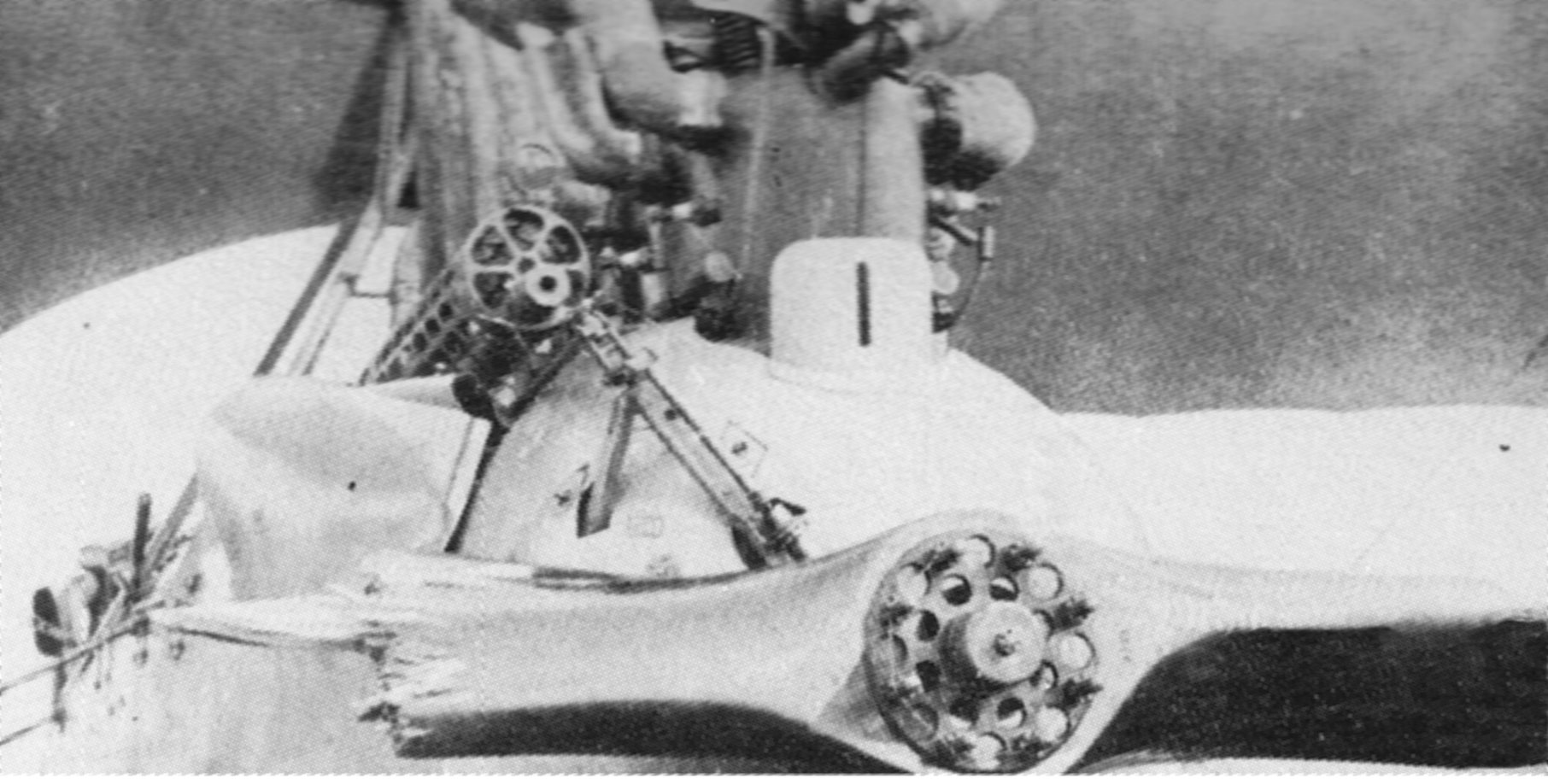
Propeller of an Albatros C.III with one blade severed as a result of a faulty synchronization gear or faulty adjustment

First, a method of determining the position of the propeller at a given instant was required. Typically, a cam, driven either directly from the propeller shaft itself, or from some part of the drive train revolving at the same speed as the propeller, generated a series of impulses at the same rate as the propeller's revolutions. There were exceptions to this. Some gears placed the cam within the gun trigger mechanism itself, and the firing impulses were sometimes timed to occur at every two or three revolutions of the propeller, or, especially in the case of hydraulic or electric gears, at the rate of two or more for each revolution. The diagrams in this section assume, for simplicity's sake, one impulse for one revolution, so that each synchronized round is "aimed" at a single spot on the propeller disc.

Synchronized gun firing badly "out of sync". All or most rounds strike one blade of propeller, quickly destroying it.

The timing of each impulse had to be adjusted to coincide with a "safe" period, when the blades of the propeller were well out of the way, and this adjustment had to be checked at intervals, especially if the propeller was changed or refitted, as well as after a major engine overhaul. Faults in this adjustment (for example, a cam wheel slipping a millimetre or two, or a pushrod flexing) (Note: The normal expansion and contraction due to changing temperature was quite enough, especially for longer rods.) could well result in every bullet fired hitting the propeller, a worse result than if the gun was fired through the propeller with no control at all. The other main type of failure resulted in fewer or no firing impulses, usually due to the generator or linkages either jamming or breaking. This was a common cause of synchronized guns "jamming".

The speed of the propeller, and thus the distance that it travelled between the firing of the gun and the arrival of the bullet at the propeller disc, varied as the rate of engine revolutions changed. Where muzzle velocity was very high, and the guns were sited well forward so that the bullets had a very short distance to reach the disc of the propeller, this difference could be largely ignored. But in the case of relatively low muzzle velocity weapons, or any gun sited well back from the propeller, the question could become critical, and in some cases the pilot had to consult his tachometer, taking care that his engine revolutions were within a "safe" range before firing, otherwise risking speedy destruction of his propeller. (Note: This phenomenon was particularly marked in Austro-Hungarian fighters armed with the Schwarzlose gun: which had a low muzzle velocity and very marginal suitability for synchronization.)

=== At the gun ===
An attempt to synchronise an unsuitable gun or faulty/disparate ammunition – "rogue" shots – some of which risk striking the propeller.

The second requirement was for a gun that would reliably fire (or hold its fire) exactly when required. Not all automatic weapons were equally amenable to synchronization. When it was ready to fire, a synchronized machine-gun needed to have a round in the breech, the breech closed, and the action cocked (the so-called "closed bolt" position). Several widely used automatic weapons (notably the Lewis gun and the Italian Revelli) were triggered from an open bolt, with an unpredictable interval between triggering and firing, and were thus not suitable for synchronization without extensive modification.

In practice it was found necessary for the gun to be fired in semi-automatic mode. As the propeller revolved, a series of firing impulses was transmitted to the gun, each of which could trigger it to fire a single shot. The majority of these impulses would catch the gun in the process of ejecting a spent round or loading a fresh one, and would thus have no effect; but as soon as the firing cycle was completed, the gun would be ready to fire as soon as it received the next impulse from the synchronizing gear. The delay between the end of the firing cycle and the arrival of the next firing impulse slowed the rate of fire in comparison with a free-firing machine gun, which fires the moment it is ready to do so; but provided the gear functioned correctly, the gun could fire fairly rapidly between the whirling propeller blades without striking them.

Some other machine-guns, such as the Austrian Schwarzlose and the American Marlin, proved less than perfectly adapted to synchronization, although eventually predictable "single shot" firing was achieved, typically by modifying the trigger mechanism to emulate "closed bolt" firing. Most weapons that were successfully synchronized (at least in the First World War period) were (like the German Parabellum and Spandau guns and the British Vickers) based on the original Maxim gun of 1884, a closed bolt weapon operated by barrel recoil. Before these distinctions were fully understood, much time was wasted on attempts to synchronize unsuitable weapons.

Even a closed bolt weapon needed reliable ammunition. If the primer in a cartridge is faulty to the extent of delaying the firing of the gun for a tiny fraction of a second (quite a common case in practice with mass-produced ammunition) this is of little consequence in the case of a gun in use by infantry on the ground, but in the case of a synchronized "aircraft" gun such a delay can produce a rogue firing, sufficiently "out of time" for it to risk hitting the propeller. A very similar problem could arise where the mass of a special round (such as an incendiary or explosive one) was different enough to produce a substantial difference in muzzle velocity. This was compounded by the additional risk to the integrity of the propeller due to the nature of the round.

The "trigger motor" could theoretically take two forms. The earliest patent (Schneider 1913) assumed that the synchronization gear would periodically prevent the gun from firing, thus operating as a true, or literal "interrupter". In practice all "real-life" synchronization gears, for which we have reliable technical details, directly fired the gun: operating it as if it were a semi-automatic weapon rather than a completely automatic one.

=== The linkage between propeller and gun ===
The third requirement is for a linkage between the "machines" (engine and gun) to be synchronized. Many early gears used an intricate and inherently fragile bell crank and push rod linkage that could easily jam or otherwise malfunction, especially when required to work at higher speeds than it had been designed for. There were several alternative methods, including an oscillating rod, a flexible drive, a column of hydraulic fluid, a cable, or an electrical connection.

Generally, mechanical systems were inferior to hydraulic or electric ones, but none were ever entirely foolproof, and synchronization gears at best always remained liable to occasional failure. The Luftwaffe ace Adolf Galland in his memoir of the war period The First and the Last describes a serious faulty synchronization incident in 1941.

== Rate of fire ==
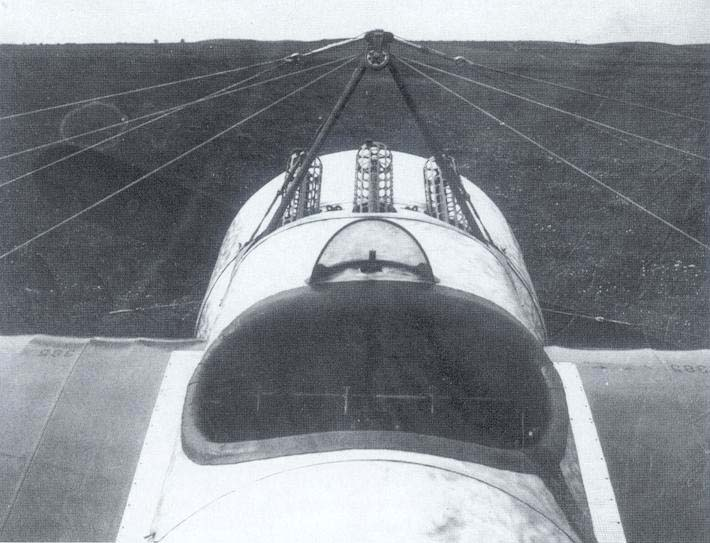
The Fokker E.IV prototype's original "three-Spandau" armament, before the portside gun was removed. Production examples had two guns, arranged symmetrically.

A pilot would usually only have the target in his sights for a fleeting moment, so a concentration of bullets was vital for achieving a "kill". Even flimsy First World War aircraft often took a surprisingly large number of hits to shoot down, and later, larger aircraft were even harder propositions. There were two obvious solutions – to fit a more efficient gun with a higher cyclic rate of fire, or increase the number of guns carried. (Note: A third solution was to replace the rifle calibre weapons with heavy machine guns or cannon: for various reasons this did not become common until the 1940s.) Both of these measures impinged on the question of synchronization.

Early synchronized guns of the 1915–1917 period had a rate of fire in the region of 400 rounds per minute. At this comparatively leisurely rate of fire a synchronizer can be geared down to deliver a single firing impulse every two or three turns of the propeller, rendering it more reliable without unduly slowing the rate of fire. To control a faster gun, with, for example, a cyclic rate of 800 or 1,000 rounds a minute, it was necessary to supply at least one impulse (if not two) for every rotation of the propeller, making it more liable to failure. The intricate mechanism of a mechanical linkage system, especially of the "push rod" type, could easily shake itself to pieces when driven at this rate.

The final version of the Fokker Eindecker, the Fokker E.IV, came with two lMG 08 "Spandau" machine guns; this armament became standard for all the German D-type scouts starting with the Albatros D.I. (Note: Fokker's initial armament for the first prototype E.IV was in fact three machine guns but simply mounting three "followers" on the single cam wheel of the early Stangensteuerung gear proved quite unworkable, and production examples carried only two guns.) From the appearance of the Sopwith Camel and the SPAD S.XIII in mid-1917, right through to the end of gun synchronization in the 1950s, a twin gun installation was the international norm. Having the two guns firing simultaneously would obviously not have been a satisfactory arrangement. The guns needed to both fire at the same point on the propeller disc, which means that one had to fire a tiny fraction of a second later than the other. This is why early gears designed for a single machine gun needed to be modified in order to control two guns satisfactorily. In practice, at least part of the mechanism had to be duplicated, even if the two weapons were not synchronized separately.

== History ==
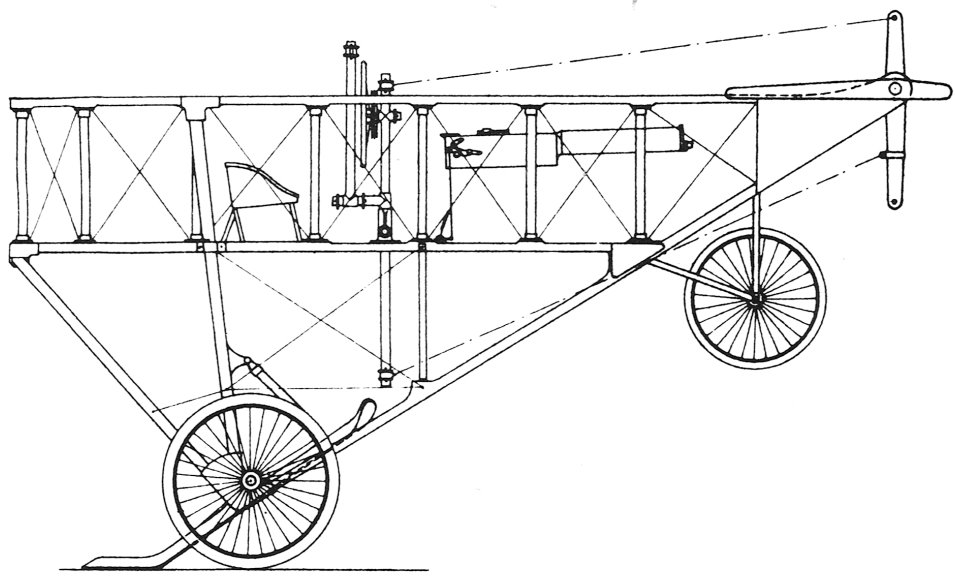
Drawing from Euler's 1910 patent for a fixed forward-firing machine gun

From the beginnings of practical flight, possible military uses for aircraft were considered, although not all writers came to positive conclusions on the subject. By 1913, military exercises in Britain, Germany, and France had confirmed the likely usefulness of aircraft for reconnaissance and surveillance, and this was seen by a few forward looking officers as implying the need to deter or destroy the enemy's reconnaissance machines. Thus aerial combat was by no means entirely unanticipated, and the machine gun was from the first seen as the most likely weapon to be used.

It is likely that an aircraft which is capable of shooting at an enemy machine will have the advantage. The most suitable weapon is a light, air-cooled machine-gun

— from a report by Major Siegert, German General Staff, 1 January 1914

What was not generally agreed on was the superiority, at least for an attacking aircraft, of fixed forward-firing guns, aimed by pointing the aircraft at its target, rather than flexible weapons, aimed by a gunner other than the pilot.

The idea of coupling the firing mechanism to the propeller's rotation is an affectation. The objection is the same as to any gun position which is fixed along the longitudinal axis of the aircraft: the pilot is forced to fly directly at the enemy in order to fire. Under certain circumstances this is highly undesirable.

— from the same report by Major Siegert

As late as 1916, pilots of the DH.2 pusher fighter had problems convincing their senior officers that the forward-firing armament of their aircraft was more effective if it was fixed to fire forward rather than being flexible. On the other hand, August Euler had patented the idea of a fixed gun as early as 1910 – long before tractor aircraft became the norm, illustrating his patent with a diagram of a machine gun-armed pusher.

=== The Franz Schneider patent (1913–1914) ===
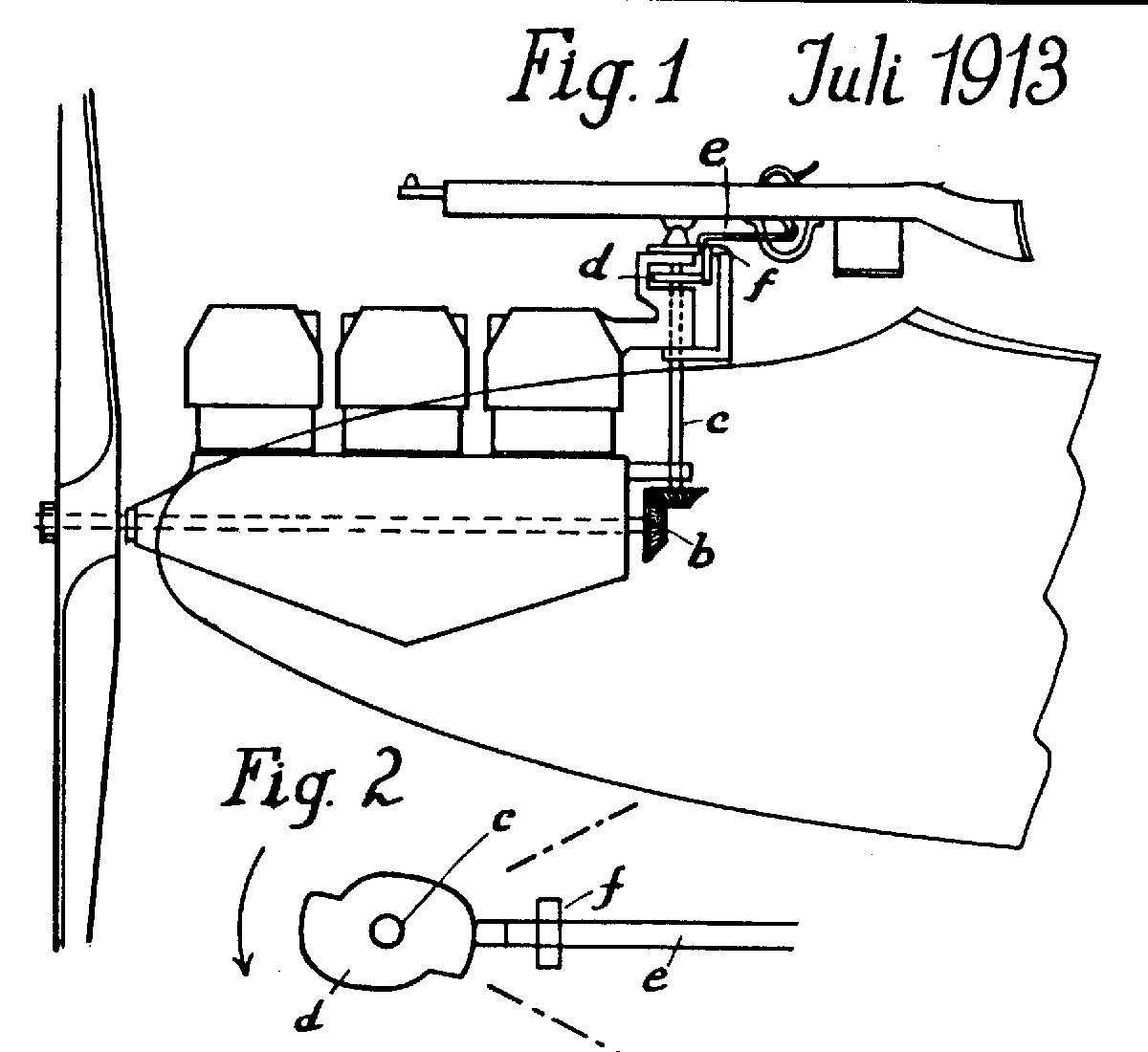
Drawing from the first known patent for a gear to allow an automatic weapon to fire through the blades of a spinning aeroplane propeller

Whether directly inspired by Euler's original patent or not, the first inventor to patent a method of firing forward through a tractor propeller was the Swiss engineer Franz Schneider, formerly with Nieuport, but by then working for the LVG Company in Germany.

The patent was published in the German aviation magazine Flugsport in 1914, meaning that the concept became public knowledge at an early stage. The linkage between the propeller and the gun is achieved with a spinning drive shaft, rather than a reciprocating rod. The impulses needed to operate the trigger, or in this case to prevent the trigger from operating, are produced by a cam wheel with two lobes at 180° apart situated at the gun itself since firing is to be interrupted by both blades of the propeller. No attempt was made (so far as is known) to build or test an actual operating gear based on this patent, which attracted little or no official interest at the time. The exact form of the synchronization gear fitted to Schneider's LVG E.I of 1915 and its relationship to this patent is unknown, since no plans survive.

=== The Raymond Saulnier patent (1914) ===
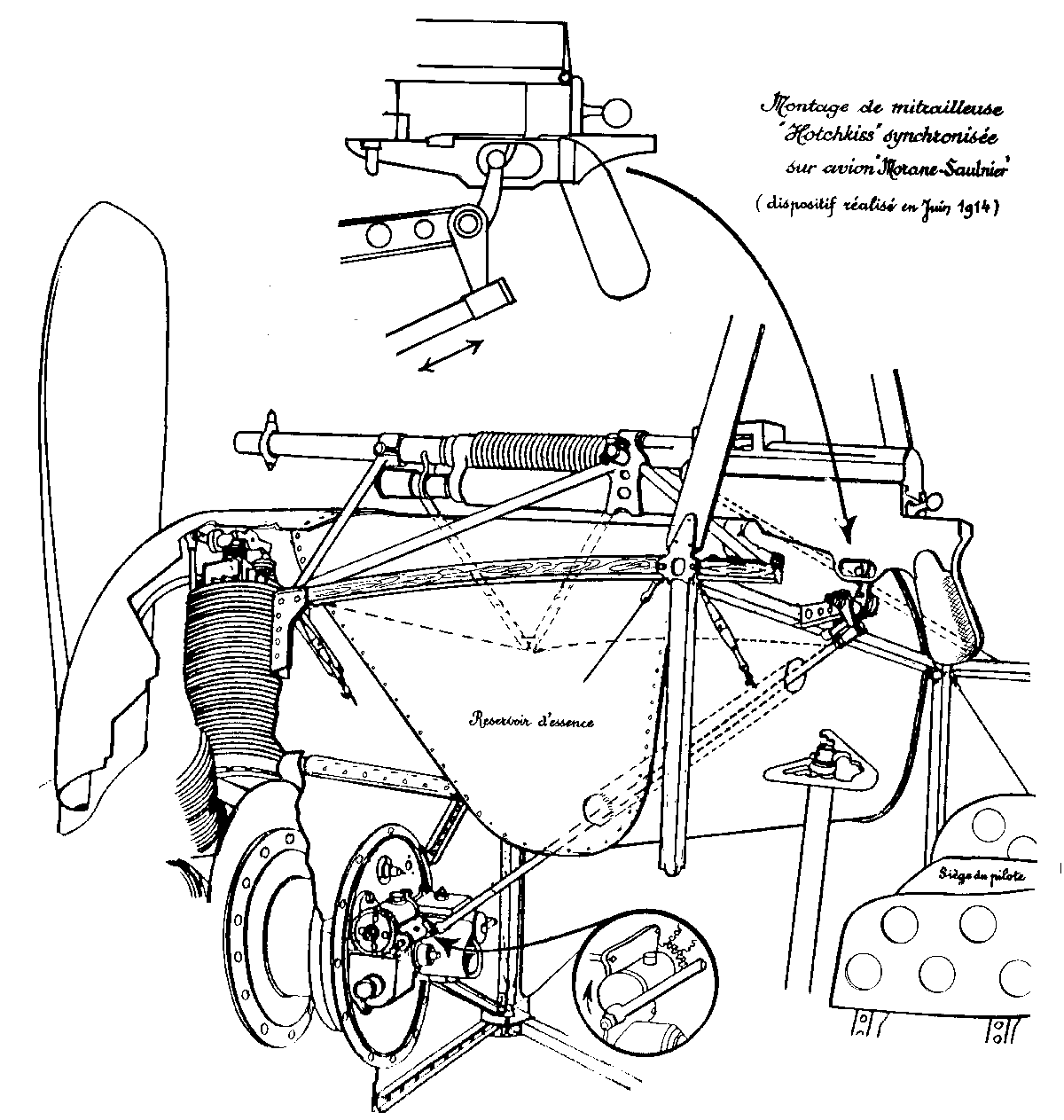
Sketch from Morane-Saulnier design drawings based on original (1914) French patent

Unlike the Schneider patent design, Saulnier's device was actually built, and may be considered the first practical synchronization gear to be tested. For the first time, the cam producing the to-and-fro movement conveying firing impulses to the gun is situated at the engine (driven in this case by the same spindle that operated the oil pump and the tachometer) and the impulses themselves are transmitted by a reciprocating rod rather than Schneider's rotating shaft. The idea of literally "interrupting" the firing of the gun gives way (probably as the result of experience) to the principle of pulling the trigger for each successive shot, like the action of a semi-automatic weapon.

It has been pointed out that this was a practical design that should have worked, but it did not. Apart from possible inconsistencies in the ammunition supplied, the real problem was that the gun used to trial the gear, a gas-operated Hotchkiss 8 mm (.323 in) machine gun borrowed from the French army, was fundamentally unsuitable for "semi-automatic" firing. Following initial unsuccessful tests, the gun had to be returned, and the experiments ceased.

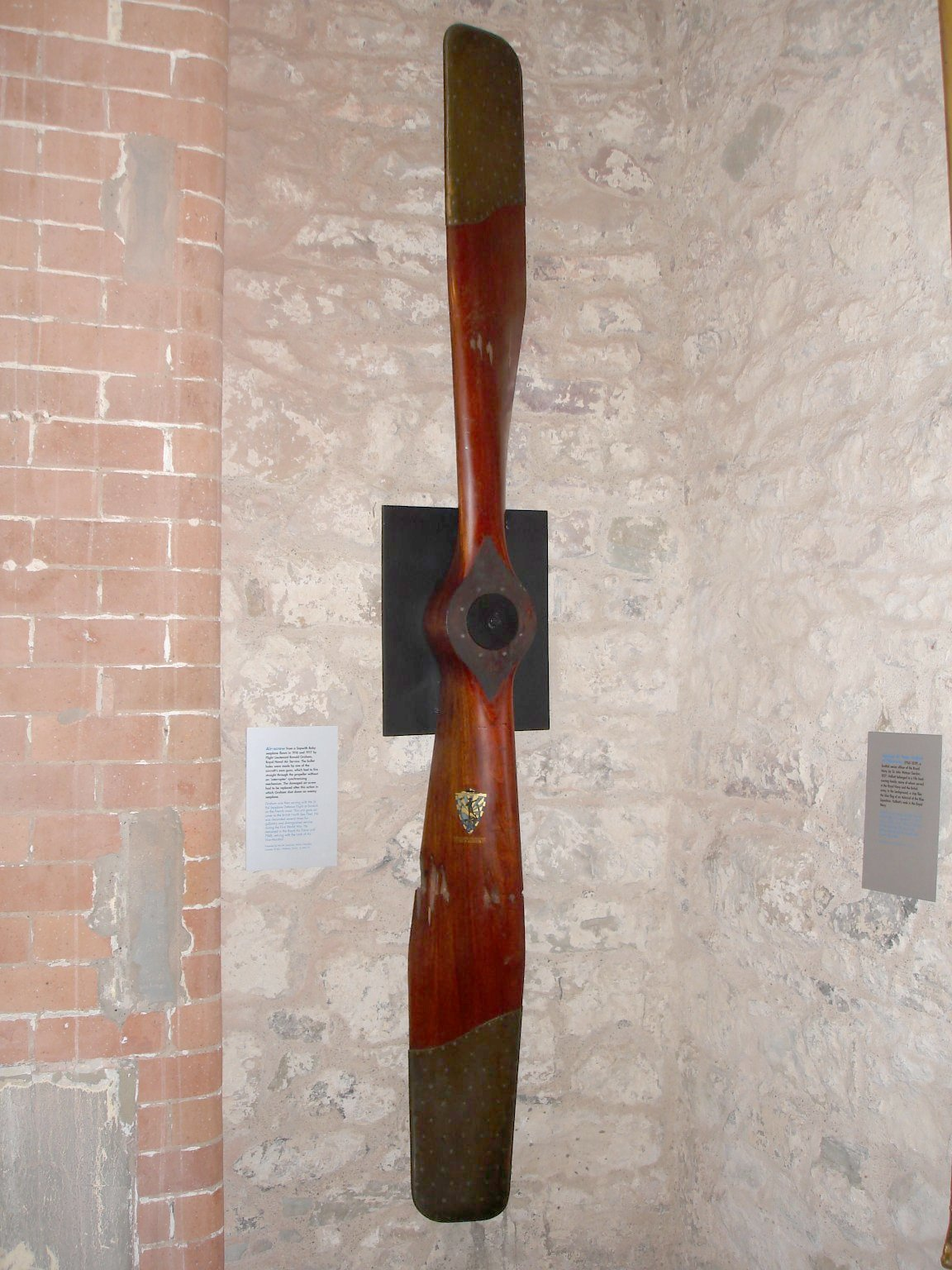
Damaged propeller from a Sopwith Baby aircraft c. 1916/17 showing bullet holes from a machine gun fired through the propeller without a synchronizer.

=== Unsynchronized guns and the "deflector wedge" concept ===
When the pilots of the British Royal Flying Corps and Royal Naval Air Service arrived in France in 1914, they were equipped with pusher aircraft too underpowered to carry machine guns and still have a chance of overtaking the enemy, and tractor aircraft which were difficult to arm effectively because the propeller was in the way. Among other attempts to get around this – such as firing obliquely past the arc of the propeller, and even efforts, doomed to failure, to synchronize the Lewis Gun which was at the time the "standard" British aircraft weapon – was the expedient of firing straight through the propeller arc and "hoping for the best". A high proportion of bullets would in the normal course pass the propeller without striking the blades, (Note: Woodman in several places estimates the ratio of bullets striking the propeller as 25% (1:4). This seems incredibly high: A simple calculation, based on the percentage of the disc of the propeller taken up by the blades, would indicate that 12.5% (1:8) is still fairly pessimistic.) and each blade might typically take several hits before there was much danger of its failing, especially if it were bound with tape to prevent splintering (see diagram below, and illustration to the left).

Unsynchronised gun – fire more or less randomly spread around propeller disc – most rounds pass but a few strike the propeller

After his early synchronization experiments failed, Saulnier pursued a method trusting rather less to statistics and luck by developing armoured propeller blades that would resist damage.

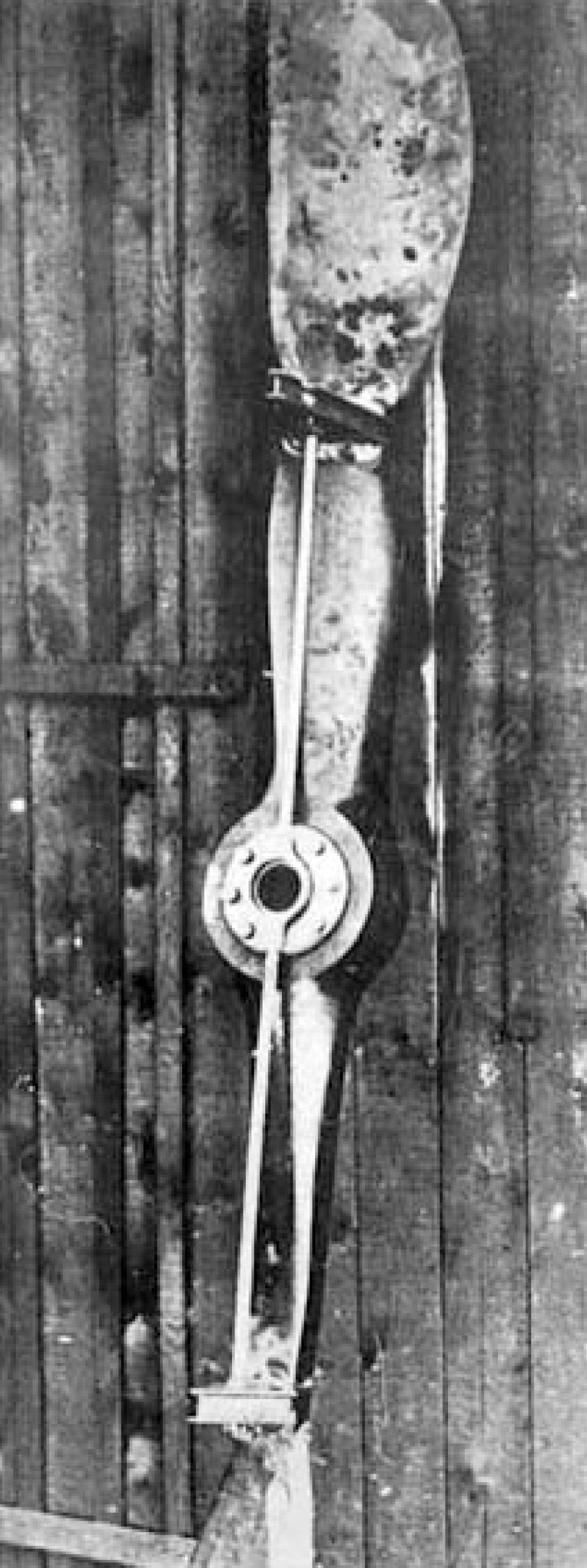
Salvaged propeller with deflectors captured by the Germans.

By March 1915, when French pilot Roland Garros approached Saulnier to arrange for this device to be installed on his Morane-Saulnier Type L, these had taken the form of steel wedges which deflected the bullets which might otherwise have damaged the propeller, or ricocheted dangerously. Garros himself and his personal mechanic Jules Hue are sometimes credited with testing and perfecting the "deflectors". This crude system worked after a fashion, although the wedges diminished the propeller's efficiency, and the not inconsiderable force of the impact of bullets on the deflector blades must have put undesirable stress on the engine's crankshaft.

On 1 April 1915 Garros shot down his first German aircraft, killing both the crew. On 18 April 1915, after two more victories, Garros was forced down (by ground fire) behind German lines. Although he was able to burn his aircraft, Garros was captured and his special propeller was sufficiently intact to be sent for evaluation by the Inspektion der Fliegertruppen (Idflieg) at Döberitz near Berlin.

=== Fokker's Synchronizer and other German gears ===
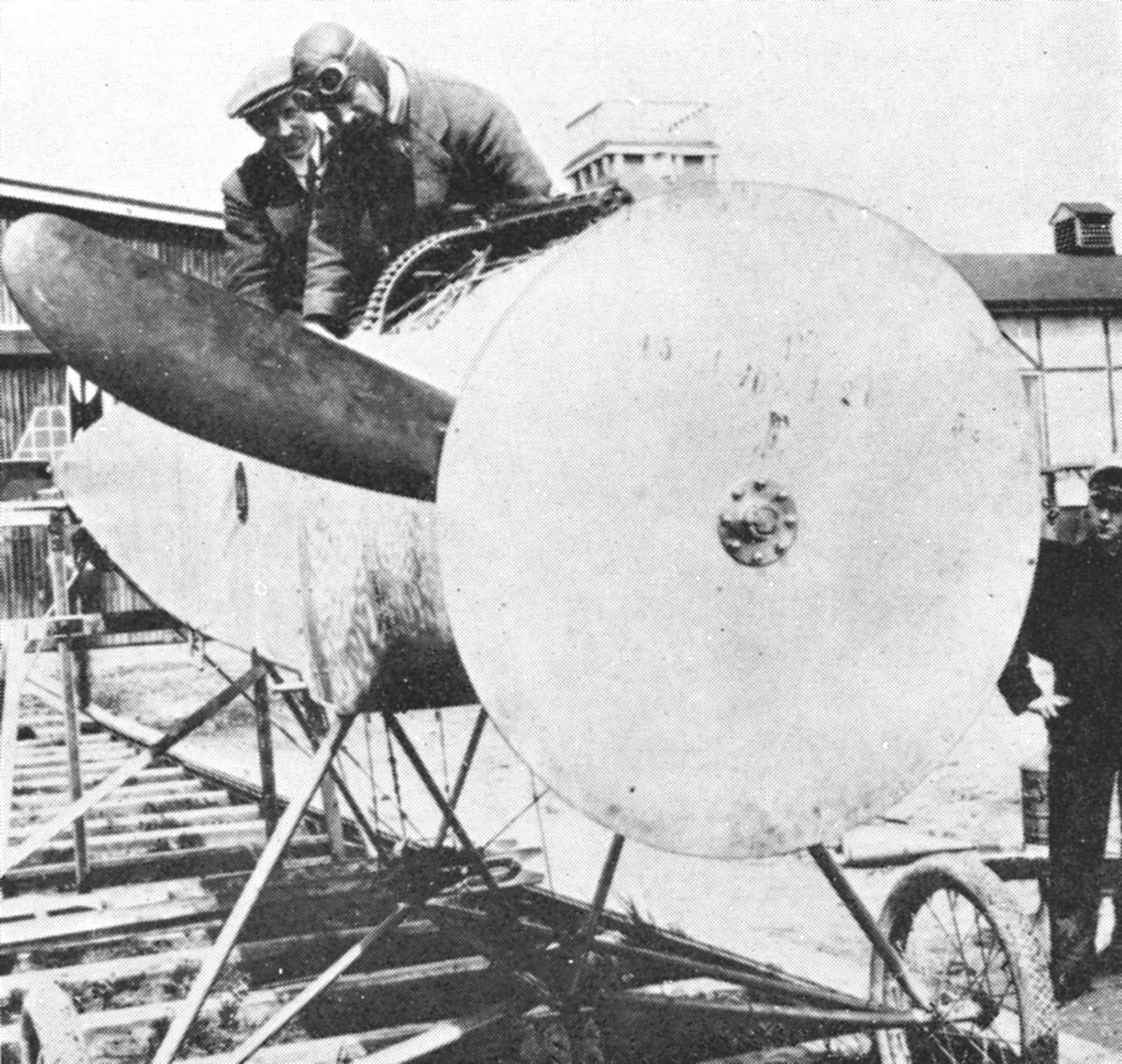
Fokker Synchronization gear set up for ground firing test. The wooden disc records the point on the disc of the propeller where each round passed. The diagram opposite shows the probable result for a properly working gear. Inherent inaccuracies in both the gear and the triggering of the gun itself, small faults in normal service ammunition, and even the differing RPM rates of the engine, all combine to produce a "spread" of hits, rather than every bullet striking the disc in precisely the same spot

Correctly functioning synchronisation gear: all rounds fired well within "safe" zone (well clear of propeller)

Inspection of the propeller from Garros' machine prompted Idflieg to attempt to copy it. Initial trials indicated that the deflector wedges would not be sufficiently strong to cope with the standard steel-jacketed German ammunition, and representatives from Fokker and Pfalz, two companies already building Morane copies (although, strangely, not Schneider's LVG concern) were invited to Döberitz to inspect the mechanism and suggest ways that its action might be duplicated.

Anthony Fokker was able to persuade Idflieg to arrange the loan of a Parabellum machine gun and ammunition so that his device could be tested, and for these items to be transported forthwith to the Fokker Flugzeugwerke GmbH at Schwerin (although probably not in his railway compartment or "under his arm", as he claimed after the war).

The story of his conception, development and installation of the Fokker synchronization device in a period of 48 hours (first found in an authorised biography of Fokker written in 1929) is not now believed to be factual. Another possible explanation is that Garros's Morane, partly destroyed by fire as it was, had sufficient traces of the original synchronization gear remaining for Fokker to have guessed how it worked. For various reasons this also seems unlikely, (Note: The main problem is that it assumes Garros was flying the same machine that Saulnier had used for his earlier tests!) and the current historical consensus points to a synchronization device having been in development by Fokker's team (including engineer Heinrich Lübbe) prior to the capture of Garros's machine.

==== The Fokker Stangensteuerung gear ====
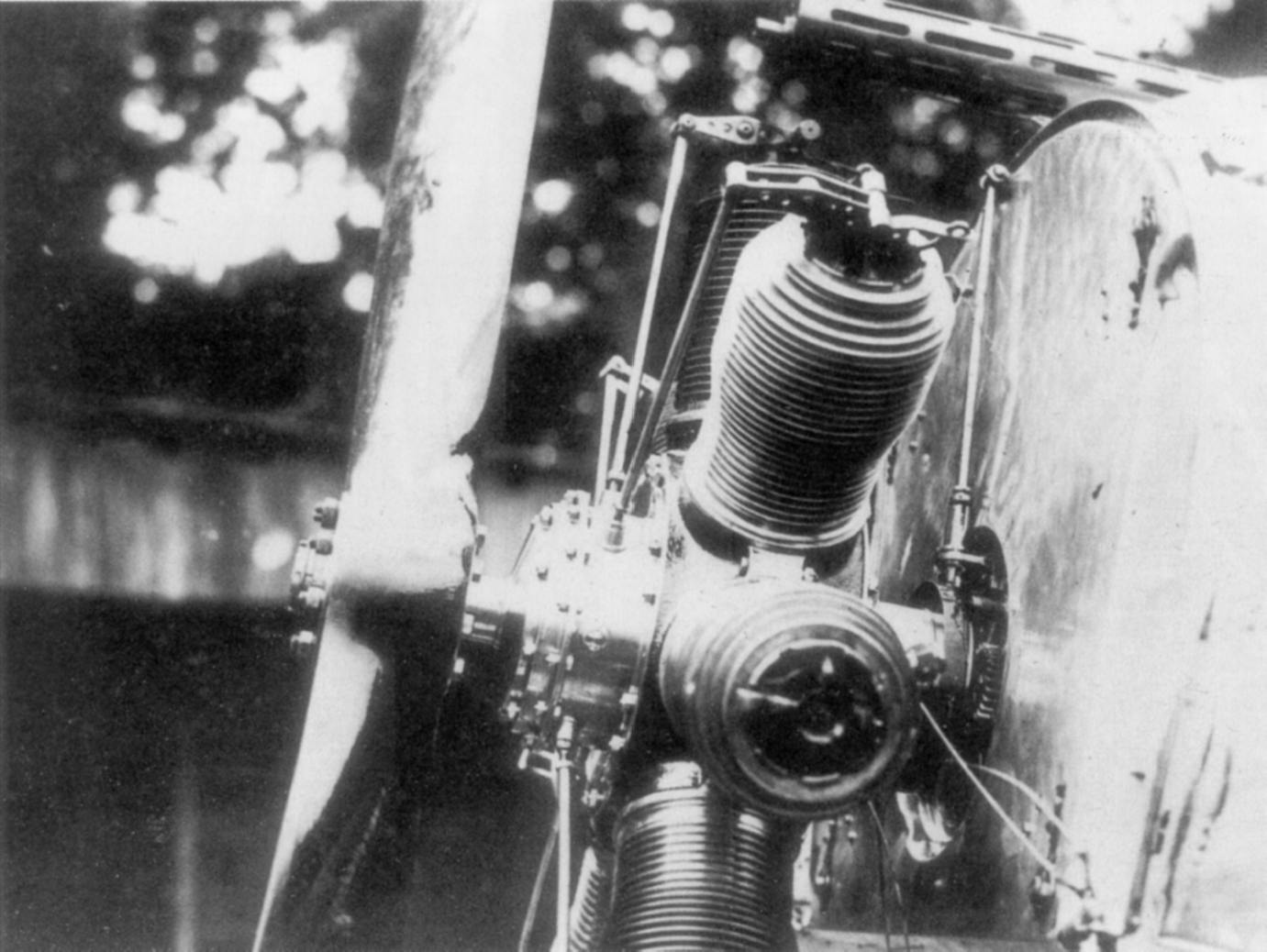
Detail of early Fokker Eindecker – cowl is removed, showing Fokker's original Stangensteuerung gear connected directly to the oil pump drive at the rear of the engine

The pilot first pushes a trigger enabler, which enables the cam follower.

The pilot can then push the trigger lever to fire the machine gun while staying synchronized with the propeller.

Different parts of the gear are color-coded as follows:
Trigger enabler
Trigger lever
Gun trigger
Coupling piece
Push rod
Cam follower
Cam & shaft (shown in both front view and lateral view)

Whatever its ultimate source, the initial version of the Fokker synchronization gear (see illustration) very closely followed, not Schneider's patent, as claimed by Schneider and others, (Note: In 1916 LVG and Schneider sued Fokker for patent infringement – and though the courts repeatedly found in Schneider's favour, Fokker refused to pay any royalties, all the way to the time of the Third Reich in 1933.) but Saulnier's. Like the Saulnier patent, Fokker's gear was designed to actively fire the gun rather than interrupt it, and, like the later Vickers-Challenger gear developed for the RFC, it followed Saulnier in taking its primary mechanical drive from the oil pump of a rotary engine. The "transmission" between the motor and the gun was by a version of Saulnier's reciprocating push-rod. The main difference was that instead of the push rod passing directly from the engine to the gun itself, which would have required a tunnel through the firewall and fuel tank (as shown in the Saulnier patent drawings), it was driven by a shaft joining the oil pump to a small cam at the top of the fuselage. This eventually proved unsatisfactory, as the oil pump's mechanical drive spindle was insufficiently robust to take the extra load.

Before the failings of the first form of the gear had become clear, Fokker's team had adapted the new system to the new Parabellum MG14 machine gun, and fitted it to a Fokker M.5K, a type which was at the time serving in small numbers with the Fliegertruppen as the A.III. This aircraft, bearing IdFlieg serial number A.16/15 became the direct forerunner to the five M.5K/MG pre-production prototypes built, and was effectively the prototype of the Fokker E.I – the first production single-seat fighter aircraft armed with a synchronized machine gun.

This prototype was demonstrated to IdFlieg by Fokker in person on 19–20 May 1915 at the Döberitz proving ground near Berlin. Leutnant Otto Parschau was test flying this aircraft by 30 May 1915. The five production prototypes (factory designated M.5K/MG and serialed E.1/15 – E.5/15) were undergoing military trials shortly thereafter. These were all armed with the Parabellum gun, synchronized with the first version of the Fokker gear. This prototype gear had such a short life that a redesign was necessary, producing the second, more familiar, production form of the gear.

The gear used in the production Eindecker fighters replaced the oil pump's mechanical driveshaft-based system with a large cam wheel, almost a light flywheel, driven directly from the spinning rotary engine's crankcase. The push rod now took its reciprocating motion directly from a "follower" on this cam wheel. At the same time the machine gun used was also changed – an lMG 08 machine gun, the so-called "Spandau", replacing the Parabellum used with the prototype gear. At this time the Parabellum was still in very short supply, and all available examples were required as observers' guns, the lighter and handier weapon being far superior in this role.

The first victory using a synchronized gun-equipped fighter is now believed to have occurred on 1 July 1915 when Leutnant Kurt Wintgens of Feldflieger Abteilung 6b, flying the Parabellum-armed Fokker M.5K/MG aircraft "E.5/15", forced down a French Morane-Saulnier Type L east of Lunéville.

Exclusive possession of a working gun synchronizer enabled a period of German air superiority on the Western Front known as the Fokker Scourge. The German high command was protective of the synchronizer system, instructing pilots not to venture over enemy territory in case they were forced down and the secret revealed, but the basic principles involved were already common knowledge, (Note: Courtney rather pungently remarks that "... there was no particular secret to protect".) and by the middle of 1916 several Allied synchronizers were already available in quantity.

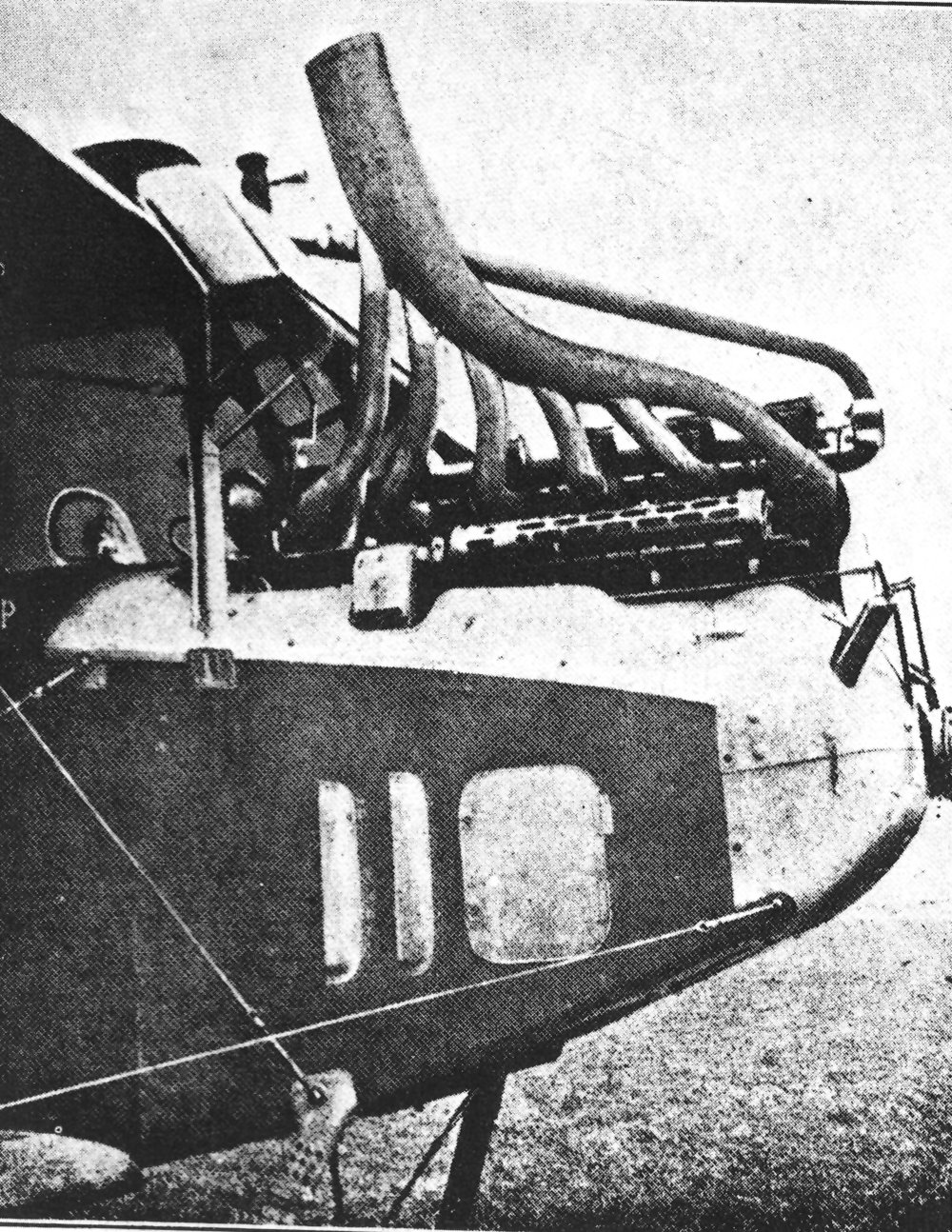
Stangensteuerung synchronized machine gun mounted well forward on Albatros C.III

By this time, the Fokker Stangensteuerung gear, which had worked reasonably well for synchronizing a single gun, firing at a modest cyclic rate through a two-bladed propeller driven by a rotary engine, was becoming obsolete.

Stangensteuerung gears for "stationary", i.e., in-line engines, worked from a small cam immediately behind the propeller (see illustration). This produced a basic dilemma: A short, fairly robust push rod meant that the machine gun had to be mounted well forward, putting the breech of the gun out of the pilot's reach for clearing jams. If the gun was mounted in the ideal position, within easy reach of the pilot, a much longer push rod was required, which tended to bend and break.

The other problem was that the Stangensteuerung never worked well with more than one gun. Two (or even three) guns, mounted side by side and firing simultaneously, would have produced a wide spread of fire that would have been impossible to match with the "safe zone" between the whirling propeller blades. Fokker's initial answer to this was the fitting of extra "followers" to the Stangensteuerung's large cam wheel, to (theoretically) produce the "ripple" salvo necessary to ensure that the guns were aimed at the same point on the propeller disc. This proved a disastrously unstable arrangement in the case of three guns, and was rather less than satisfactory, even for two. Most of the early Fokker and Halberstadt biplane fighters were limited to a single gun for this reason. (Note: At least as much as the more commonly cited effect on performance of the weight of an extra gun.)

In fact, the builders of the new Albatros twin-gunned stationary-engine fighters of late 1916 had to introduce their own synchronization gear, known as the Hedtke gear or Hedtkesteuerung, and it was evident that Fokker were going to have to come up with something radically new.

==== The Fokker Zentralsteuerung gear ====
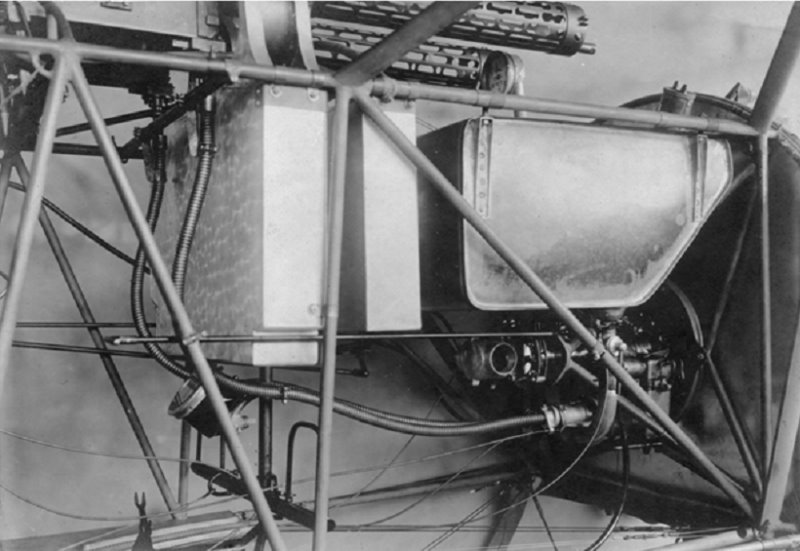
Twin guns synchronized by the Zentralsteuerung system in a Fokker D.VIII fighter. The "pipes" connecting the guns and the engine are flexible drive shafts

This was designed in late 1916 and took the form of a new synchronization gear without any rods at all. The cam that generated the firing impulses was moved from the engine to the gun; the trigger motor in effect now generated its own firing impulses. The linkage between the propeller and the gun now consisted of a flexible drive shaft directly connecting the end of the engine camshaft to the trigger motor of the gun. The firing button for the gun simply engaged a clutch at the engine which set the flexible drive (and thus the trigger motor) in motion. In some ways this brought the new gear closer to the original Schneider patent (q.v.).

A major advantage was that the adjustment (to set where on the propeller's disc each bullet was to impact) was now in the gun itself. This meant that each gun was adjusted separately, an important feature, since twin synchronized guns were not set to be fired in strict unison, but when they were pointing at the same point on the propeller disc. Each gun could be fired independently, since it had its own flexible drive, linked to the engine camshaft by a junction box, and having its own clutch. This provision of a quite separate set of components for each gun also meant that a failure in the gear for one gun did not impinge on the other.

This gear was available in numbers by mid 1917, in time for installation on the Fokker Dr.I triplane and all later German fighters. In fact it became the standard synchronizer for the Luftstreitkräfte for the remainder of the war, although experiments to find an even more reliable gear continued.

==== Other German synchronizers ====
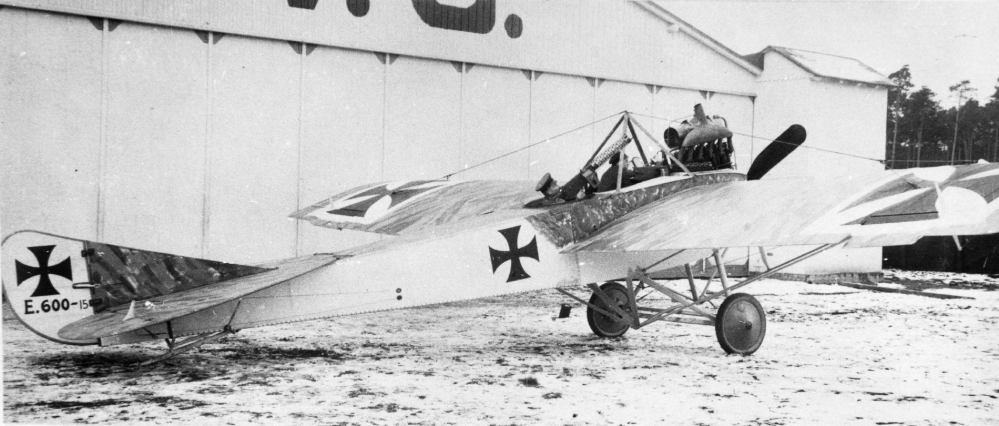
LVG E.I, with Schneider ring and forward-firing synchronized gun, presumably with a Schneider-designed gear, about which nothing is now known

===== The 1915 Schneider gear =====
In June 1915 a two-seater monoplane designed by Schneider for the LVG Company was sent to the front for evaluation. Its observer was armed with the new Schneider gun ring that was becoming standard on all German two-seaters: the pilot was apparently armed with a fixed synchronized machine gun. The aircraft crashed on its way to the front and nothing more was heard of it, or its synchronization gear, although it was presumably based on Schneider's own patent.

===== The Albatros gears =====
The new Albatros fighters of late 1916 were fitted with twin guns synchronized with the Albatros-Hedtke Steuerung gear, which was designed by Albatros Werkmeister Hedtke. The system was specifically intended to overcome the problems that had arisen in applying the Fokker Stangensteuerung gear to in-line engines and twin gun installations, and was a variation of the rigid push-rod system, driven from the rear of the crankshaft of the Mercedes D.III engine.

The Albatros D.V used a new gear, designed by Werkmeister Semmler: (the Albatros-Semmler Steuerung). It was basically an improved version of the Hedtke gear.

An official order, signed on 24 July 1917 standardised the superior Fokker Zentralsteuerung system for all German aircraft, presumably including Albatroses.

===== Electrical gears =====
Post First World War German fighters were fitted with electrical synchronizers. In such a gear, a contact or set of contacts, either on the propeller shaft itself, or some other part of the drive train revolving at the same number of revolutions per minute, generates a series of electrical pulses, which are transmitted to a solenoid driven trigger motor at the gun. Experiments with these were underway before the end of the war, and again the LVG company seems to have been involved: a British intelligence report from 25 June 1918 mentions an LVG two-seater fitted with such a gear that was brought down in the British lines. It is known that LVG built 40 C.IV two-seaters fitted with a Siemens electrical synchronizing system.

In addition, the Aviatik company received instructions to install 50 of their own electrical synchronization system on to DFW C.Vs (Av).

=== Austria-Hungary ===
The standard machine gun of the Austro-Hungarian armed forces in 1914 was the Schwarzlose MG M.07/12 machine-gun, which operated on a "delayed blow back" system and was not suited to synchronization. Unlike the French and Italians, who were eventually able to acquire supplies of Vickers guns, the Austrians were unable to obtain sufficient quantities of "Spandaus" from their German allies and were forced to use the Schwarzlose in an application for which it was not really suited. Although the problem of synchronizing the Schwarzlose was eventually partially solved, it was not until late 1916 that gears were available. Even then, at high engine revolutions Austrian synchronizer gears tended to behave very erratically. Austrian fighters were fitted with large tachometers to ensure that a pilot could check that his "revs" were within the required range before firing his guns, and propeller blades were fitted with an electrical warning system that alerted a pilot if his propeller was being hit. There were never enough gears available, due to a chronic shortage of precision tools; so that production fighters, even the excellent Austrian versions of the Albatros D.III, often had to be sent to the front in an unarmed state, for squadron armourers to fit such guns and gears as could be scrounged, salvaged or improvised.

Rather than standardising on a single system, different Austrian manufacturers produced their own gears. The research of Harry Woodman (1989) identified the following types:

==== Zahnrad-Steuerung (cogwheel-control) ====
Drive was from the camshaft operating rods of the Austro-Daimler engine via a wormgear. The early Schwarzlose gun had a synchronized rate of 360 rounds per minute with this gear – this was later boosted to 380 rounds with the MG16 model.

==== Bernatzik-Steuerung ====
Drive was taken from the rocking arm of an exhaust valve, a lever fixed to the valve housing transmitting impulses to the gun through a rod. Designed by Leutnant Otto Bernatzik, it was geared down to deliver a firing impulse every second revolution of the propeller, and fired at about 380 to 400 rounds per gun. As with other gears synchronizing the Schwarzlose gun, firing became erratic at high engine speeds.

==== Priesel-Steuerung ====
Apart from a control that engaged the cam follower and fired the gun in one movement, this gear was based closely on the original Fokker Stangensteuerung gear. It was designed by Oberleutnant Guido Priesel, and became standard on Oeffag Albatros fighters in 1918.

==== Zap-Steuerung (Zaparka control) ====
This gear was designed by Oberleutnant Eduard Zaparka. Drive was from the rear of the camshaft of a Hiero engine through a transmission shaft with Cardan joints. The rate of fire, with the later Schwarzlose gun, was up to 500 rounds per minute. The machine gun had to be placed well forward, where it was inaccessible to the pilot, so that jams could not be cleared in flight.

==== Kralische Zentralsteuerung ====
Based on the principle of the Fokker Zentralsteuerung gear, with flexible drives linked to the camshaft, and firing impulses being generated by the trigger motor of each gun. Geared down to operate more reliably with the difficult Schwarzlose gun, its rate of fire was limited to 360–380 rounds per minute.

=== United Kingdom ===
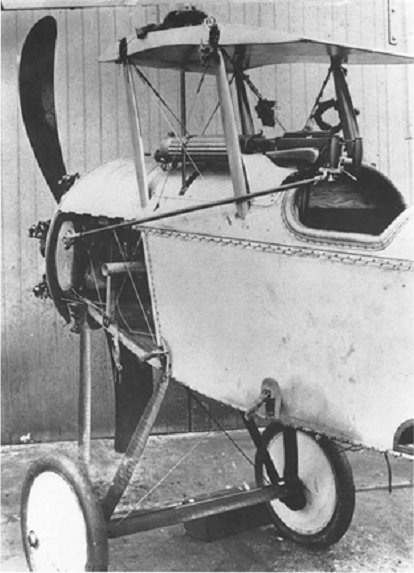
Mounting of synchronized Vickers gun on Bristol Scout, using the Vickers-Challenger gear: note long push rod at awkward angle

British gun synchronization got off to a quick but rather shaky start. The early mechanical synchronization gears turned out to be inefficient and unreliable and full standardisation on the very satisfactory hydraulic "C.C." gear was not accomplished until November 1917. Synchronized guns seem to have been rather unpopular with British fighter pilots well into 1917 and the over-wing Lewis gun, on its Foster mounting, remained the weapon for Nieuports in British service, being also initially considered as the main weapon of the S.E.5. Significantly, early problems with the C.C. gear were considered one of the less pressing matters for No. 56 squadron in March 1917, busy getting their new S.E.5 fighters combat worthy before they went to France, since they had the over-wing Lewis to fall back on! Ball actually had his Vickers gun removed altogether for a while, to save weight.

==== The Vickers-Challenger gear ====
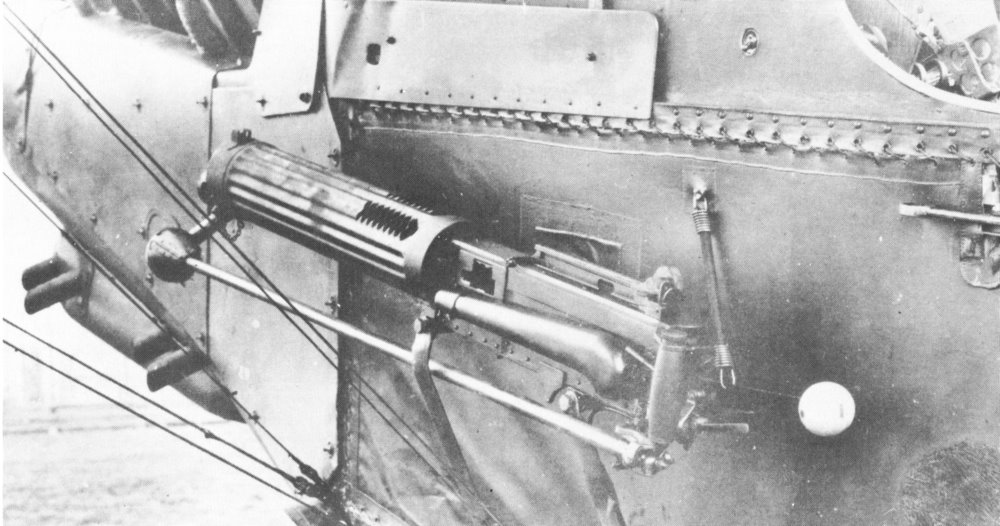
Much neater, more practical application of the Vickers-Challenger gear for the synchronized Vickers gun of an R.E.8

The first British synchronizer gear was built by the manufacturer of the machine-gun for which it was designed: it went into production in December 1915. George Challenger, the designer, was at the time an engineer at Vickers. In principle it closely resembled the first form of the Fokker gear, although this was not because it was a copy (as is sometimes reported) it was not until April 1916 that a captured Fokker was available for technical analysis. The fact is that both gears were based closely on the Saulnier patent. The first version was driven by a reduction gear attached to a rotary engine oil pump spindle as in Saulnier's design and a small impulse-generating cam was mounted externally on the port side of the forward fuselage where it was readily accessible for adjustment.

Unfortunately, when the gear was fitted to types such as the Bristol Scout and the Sopwith 1½ Strutter, which had rotary engines and their forward-firing machine gun in front of the cockpit, the long push rod linking the gear to the gun had to be mounted at an awkward angle, in which it was liable to twisting and deformation as well as expansion and contraction due to temperature changes.

For this reason the B.E.12, the R.E.8 and Vickers' own FB 19 mounted their forward-firing machine guns on the port side of the fuselage so that a relatively short version of the push rod could be linked directly to the gun.

This worked reasonably well although the "awkward" position of the gun, which precluded direct sighting, was initially much criticised. It proved less of a problem than was at first supposed once it was realized that it was the aircraft that was aimed rather than the gun itself. The last aircraft type to be fitted with the Vickers-Challenger gear, the R.E.8, retained the port-side position of the gun even after most were retrofitted with the C.C. gear from mid 1917.

==== The Scarff-Dibovski gear ====
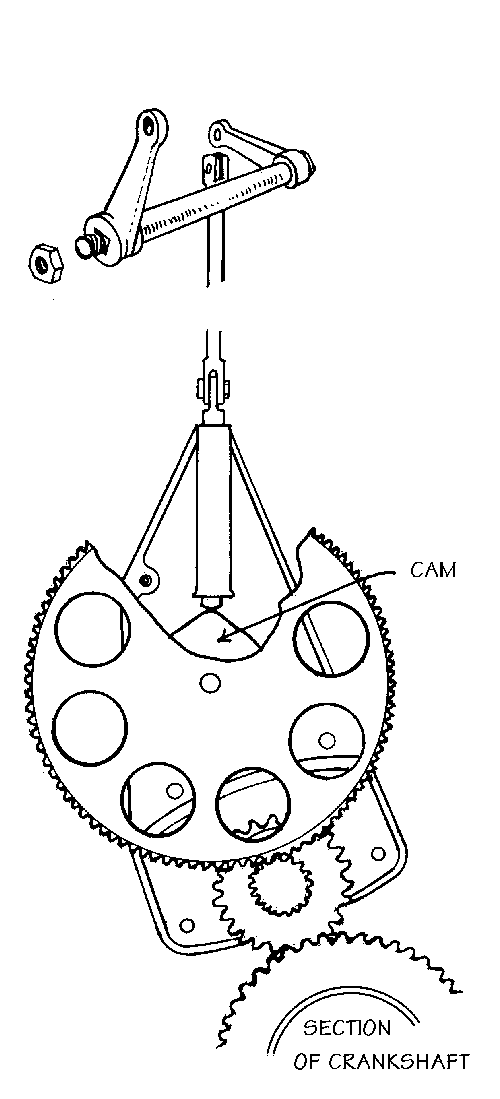
Cam gear of the Scarff Dibovsky

Lieutenant Victor Dibovski, an officer of the Imperial Russian Navy, while serving as a member of a mission to England to observe and report on British aircraft production methods, suggested a synchronization gear of his own design. According to Russian sources, this gear had already been tested in Russia, with mixed results, although it is possible that the earlier Dibovski gear was actually a deflector system rather than a true synchronizer. In any case, Warrant Officer F. W. Scarff worked with Dibovski to develop and realize the gear, which worked on the familiar cam and rider principle, the connection to the gun being by the usual push rod and a rather complicated series of levers. It was geared in order to slow the rate that firing impulses were delivered to the gun (and hence improve reliability, although not the rate of fire). The gear was ordered for the RNAS and followed the Vickers-Challenger gear into production by a matter of weeks. It was more adaptable to rotary engines than the Vickers-Challenger, but apart from early Sopwith 1½ Strutters built to RNAS orders in 1916, and possibly some early Sopwith Pups, no actual applications seem to have been recorded.

==== Ross and other "miscellaneous" gears ====
The Ross gear was an interim, field-built gear designed in 1916 specifically to replace the unsuitable Vickers-Challenger gears in the 1½ Strutters of the RFC's No.70 Squadron. (Note: It is likely that the Scarff-Dibovski gear – being Navy issue, would not have been readily available for this purpose.) Officially it was designed by Captain Ross of No.70, although it has been suggested that a flight-sergeant working under Captain Ross was largely responsible. The gear was apparently used only on 1½ Strutters, but No. 45 squadron used at least some examples of the gear, as well as No. 70. It was replaced by the Sopwith-Kauper gear when that gear became available.

Norman Macmillan, writing some years after the event, claimed that the Ross gear had a very slow rate of fire, but that it left the original trigger intact, so that it was possible "in a really tight corner" to "fire the gun direct without the gear, and get the normal rate of fire of the ground gun". Macmillan claimed that propellers with up to twenty hits nonetheless got their aircraft home. Some aspects of this information are hard to reconcile with the way a synchronized gun actually worked, and may well be a matter of Macmillan's memory playing tricks.

Another "field made" synchronizer was the ARSIAD: produced by the Aeroplane Repair Section of the No.1 Aircraft Depot in 1916. Little specific seems to be known about it; although it may have been fitted to some early R.E.8s for which no Vickers-Challenger gears could be found.

Airco and Armstrong Whitworth both designed their own gears specifically for their own aircraft. Standardisation on the hydraulic C.C. gear (described below) occurred before either had been produced in numbers. Only Sopwiths' gear (next section) was to go into production.

==== The Sopwith-Kauper gear ====
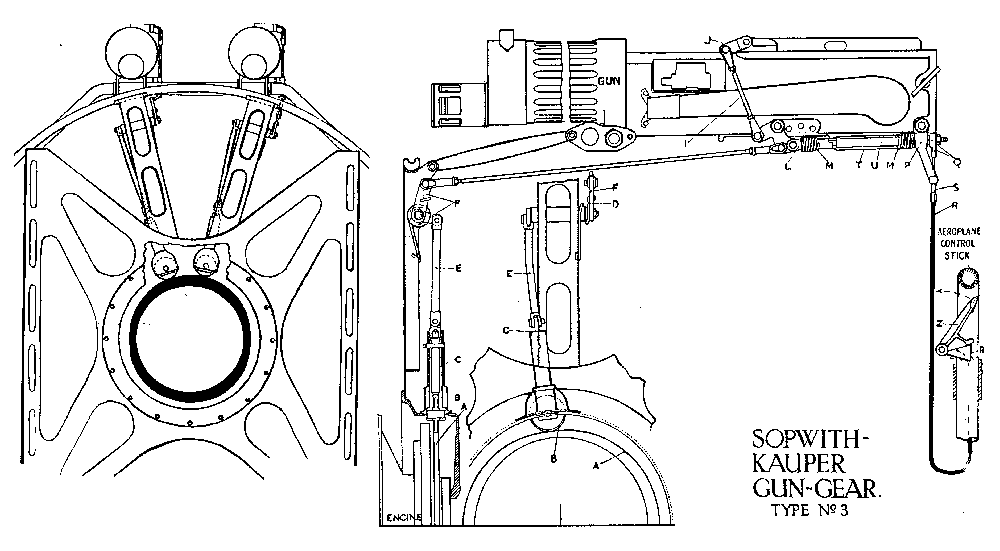
A diagram from the maintenance manual for installation of Sopwith-Kauper synchronization (Mk.III) gear in early production Sopwith Camels (1917)

The first mechanical synchronization gears fitted to early Sopwith fighters were so unsatisfactory that in mid 1916 Sopwiths had an improved gear designed by their foreman of works Harry Kauper, a friend and colleague of fellow Australian Harry Hawker. This gear was specifically intended to overcome the faults of earlier gears. Patents connected with the extensively modified Mk.II and Mk.III versions were applied for in January and June 1917.

Mechanical efficiency was improved by reversing the action of the push rod. The firing impulse was generated at a low point of the cam instead of at the lobe of the cam as in Saulnier's patent. Thus the force on the rod was exerted by tension rather than compression, (or in less technical language, the trigger motor worked by being "pulled" rather than "pushed") which enabled the rod to be lighter, minimising its inertia so that it could operate faster (at least in early versions of the gear, each revolution of the cam wheel produced two firing impulses instead of one). A single firing lever engaged the gear and fired the gun in one action, rather than the gear having to be "turned on" and then fired, as with some earlier gears.

2,750 examples of the Sopwith-Kauper gear were installed in service aircraft: as well as being the standard gear for the Sopwith Pup and Triplane it was fitted to many early Camels, and replaced earlier gears in 1½ Strutters and other Sopwith types. However, by November 1917, in spite of several modifications, it was becoming evident that even the Sopwith-Kauper gear suffered from the inherent limitations of mechanical gears. Camel squadrons, in particular, reported that propellers were frequently being "shot through", the gears having a tendency to "run away". Wear and tear, as well as the increased rate of fire of the Vickers gun and higher engine speeds were responsible for this decline in performance and reliability. By this time the teething problems of the hydraulic C.C. gear had been overcome and it was made standard for all British aircraft, including Sopwiths.

==== The Constantinesco synchronization gear ====
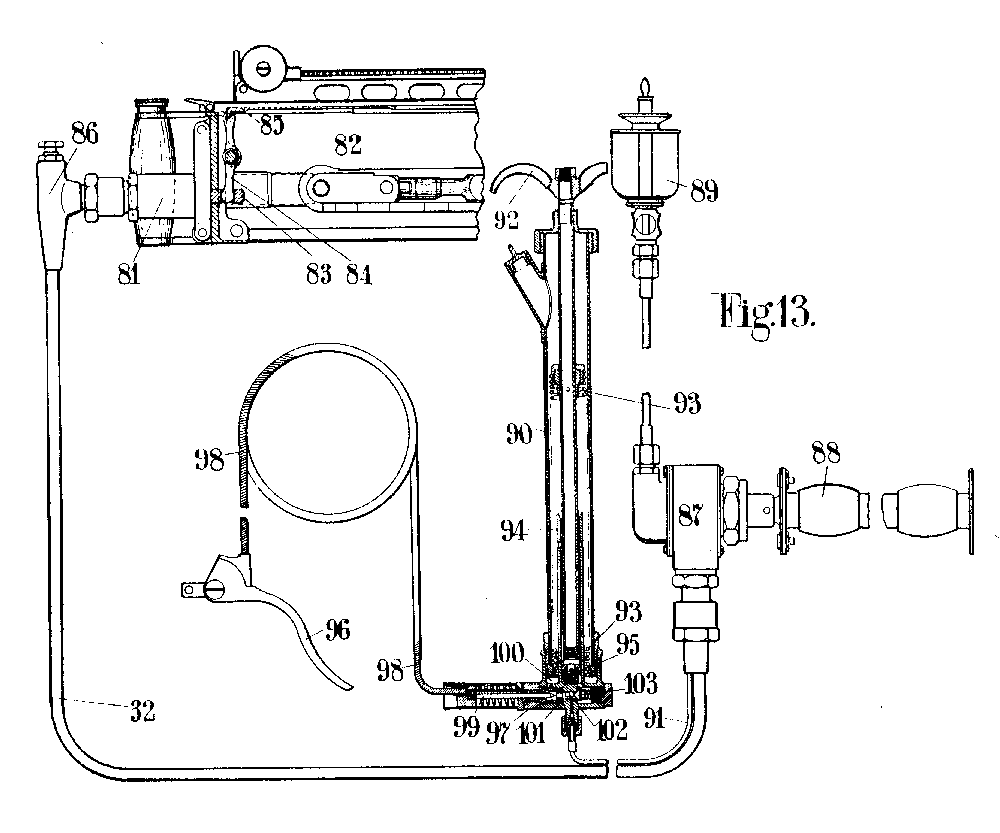
U.S. Patent office drawing for C.C. Synchronization gear. The pump-like component was the oil reservoir, and was situated in the cockpit. Lifting its handle ensured there was adequate hydraulic pressure to operate the gear

Major Colley, the Chief Experimental Officer and Artillery Adviser at the War Office Munitions Invention Department, became interested in George Constantinesco's theory of Wave Transmission, and worked with him to determine how his invention could be put to practical use, finally hitting on the notion of developing a synchronization gear based on it. Major Colley used his contacts in the Royal Flying Corps and the Royal Artillery (his own corps) to obtain the loan of a Vickers machine gun and 1,000 rounds of ammunition.

Constantinesco drew on his work with rock drills to develop a synchronization gear using his wave transmission system. In May 1916, he prepared the first drawing and an experimental model of what became known as the Constantinesco Fire Control Gear or the "C.C. (Constantinesco-Colley) Gear". The first provisional patent application for the Gear was submitted on 14 July 1916 (No. 512).

At first, the meticulous Constantinesco was dissatisfied with the odd slightly deviant hit on his test disc. It was found that carefully inspecting the ammunition cured this fault (common, of course, to all such gears); with good quality rounds, the performance of the gear pleased even its creator. A. M. Low who commanded the Royal Flying Corps secret Experimental Works at Feltham was involved in the testing. The system was perfected by Constantinesco in collaboration with the Fleet Street printer and engineer Walter Haddon at the Haddon Engineering Works in Honeypot Lane, Alperton. The first working C.C. gear was air-tested in a B.E.2c in August 1916.

The new gear had several advantages over all mechanical gears: the rate of fire was greatly improved, the synchronization was much more accurate, and above all it was readily adaptable to any type of engine and airframe, instead of needing a specially designed impulse generator for each type of engine and special linkages for each type of aircraft. In the long run (provided it was properly maintained and adjusted) it also proved far more durable and less prone to failure.

No. 55 Squadron's DH.4s arrived in France on 6 March 1917 fitted with the new gear, followed shortly after by No. 48 squadron's Bristol Fighters and No. 56 Squadron's S.E.5s. Early production models had some teething troubles in service, as ground crew learned to service and adjust the new gears, and pilots to operate them. It was late in 1917 before a version of the gear that could operate twin guns became available, so that the first Sopwith Camels had to be fitted with the Sopwith-Kauper gear instead.

From November 1917 the gear finally became standard; being fitted to all new British aircraft with synchronized guns from that date up to the Gloster Gladiator of 1937.

Over 6,000 gears were fitted to machines of the Royal Flying Corps and the Royal Naval Air Service between March and December 1917. Twenty thousand more "Constantinesco-Colley" gun synchronization systems were fitted to British military aircraft between January and October 1918, during the period when the Royal Air Force was formed from the two earlier services on April 1, 1918. A total of 50,000 gears were manufactured during the twenty years it was standard equipment.

==== The Betteridge gear ====
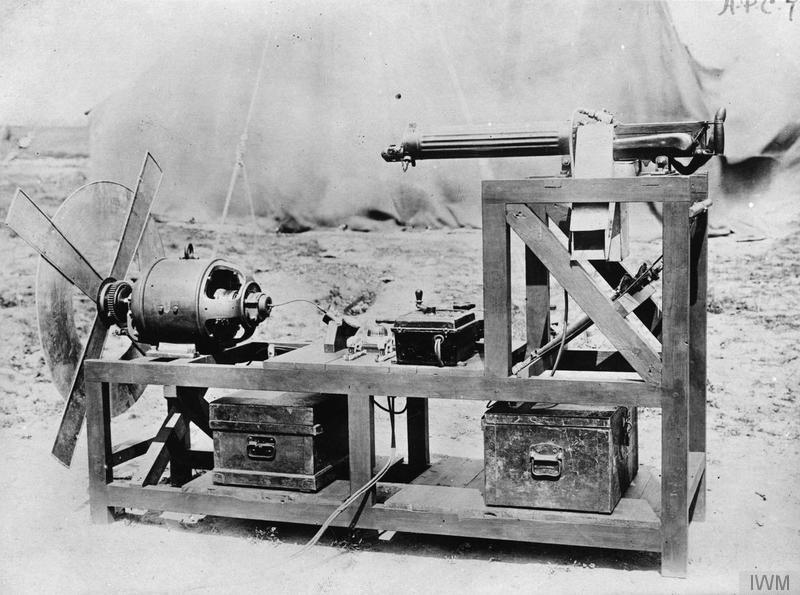
A synchronized Vickers gun fitted to a test stand; an electric motor drives a structure that simulates the propeller

The C.C. gear was not the only hydraulic gear to be proposed; in 1917 Air Mechanic A.R. Betteridge of No.1 Squadron Australian Flying Corps built and tested a gear of his own design while serving with his unit in Palestine. No official interest was expressed in this device; possibly the C.C. gear was already in prospect. The illustration seems very likely to be of the test rig for this gear.

=== France ===
The French Aviation Militaire was fortunate in that they were able to standardise on two reasonably satisfactory synchronization gears – one adapted for rotary engines, and the other for "stationary" (in-line) ones – almost from the beginning.

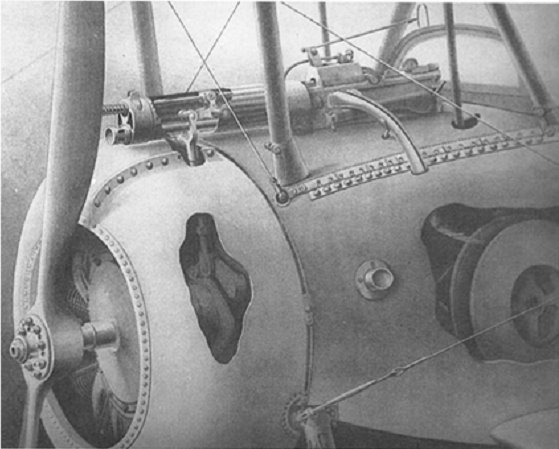
Nieuport 17 with machine gun synchronized by Alkan-Hamy system. The large reel behind the machine gun is a take-up spool for the ammunition belt and has nothing to do with the synchronization gear. Note how the push rod has effectively become part of the gun

==== The Alkan-Hamy gear ====
The first French synchronizer was developed by Sergeant-Mécanicien Robert Alkan and Ingénieur du Génie maritime Hamy. It was based closely on the definitive Fokker Stangensteuerung gear: the main difference being that the push rod was installed within the Vickers gun, using a redundant steam tube in the cooling jacket. This mitigated a major drawback of other push rod gears in that the rod, being supported for its whole length, was much less liable to distortion or breakage. Vickers guns modified to take this gear can be distinguished by the housing for the push rod's spring, projecting from the front of the gun like a second barrel. This gear was first installed and air-tested in a Nieuport 12, on 2 May 1916, and other pre-production gears were fitted to contemporary Morane-Saulnier and Nieuport fighters. The Alkan-Hamy gear was standardised as the Système de Synchronisation pour Vickers Type I (moteurs rotatifs), becoming available in numbers in time for the arrival of the Nieuport 17 at the front in mid 1916, as the standard gear for forward-firing guns of rotary-engine French aircraft.

The Nieuport 28 used a different gear – now known only through American documentation, where it is described as the "Nieuport Synchronizing gear" or the "Gnome gear". A spinning drive shaft, driven by the rotating crankcase of the Nieuport's 160 CV Gnome 9N Monosoupape rotary engine, drove two separately adjustable trigger motors – each imparting firing impulses to its gun by means of its own short rod. Photographic evidence suggests that an earlier version of this gear, controlling a single gun, might have been fitted to the Nieuport 23 and the Hanriot HD.1.

==== The Birkigt gear ====
The SPAD S.VII was designed around Marc Birkigt's Hispano-Suiza engine, and when the new fighter entered service in September 1916 it came armed with a single Vickers gun synchronized with a new gear provided by Birkigt for use with his engine. Unlike most other mechanical gears, the "SPAD gear" as it was often called, did without a pushrod altogether: the firing impulses being transmitted to the gun torsionally by a moving oscillating shaft, which rotated through about a quarter of a revolution, alternately clockwise and anticlockwise. This oscillation was more mechanically efficient than the reciprocating motion of a push rod, permitting higher speeds. Officially known as the Système de Synchronisation pour Vickers Type II (moteurs fixes) the Birkigt gear was later adapted to control two guns, and remained in use in French service up to the time of the Second World War.

=== Russia ===
No Russian synchronization gears went into production before the 1917 Revolution – although experiments by Victor Dibovski in 1915 contributed to the later British Scarff-Dibovski gear (described above), and another naval officer, G.I. Lavrov, also designed a gear that was fitted to the unsuccessful Sikorsky S-16. French and British designs licence-built in Russia used the Alkan-Hamy or Birkigt gears.

Fighters of the Soviet era used synchronized guns right up to the time of the Korean War, when the Lavochkin La-11 and the Yakovlev Yak-9 became the last synchronizer-equipped aircraft to see combat action.

=== Italy ===
The Italian Fiat-Revelli gun did not prove amenable to synchronization, so the Vickers became the standard pilot's weapon, synchronized by the Alkan-Hamy or Birkigt gears.

=== United States ===
French and British combat aircraft ordered for the American Expeditionary Force in 1917/18 were fitted with their "native" synchronization gears, including the Alkan-Hamy in Nieuports and French-built Sopwiths, the Birkigt gear in SPADs, and the C.C. gear for British types. The C.C. was also adopted for the twin M1917/18 Marlin machine guns fitted to the American built DH-4, and was itself made in America until the Nelson gear appeared in numbers.

==== The Nelson gear ====
The Marlin gas operated gun proved less amenable to synchronization than the Vickers. It was found that "rogue" shots occasionally pierced the propeller, even when the gear was properly adjusted and otherwise functioning well. The problem was eventually resolved by modifications to the Marlin's trigger mechanism, but in the meantime the engineer Adolph L. Nelson at the Airplane Engineering Department at McCook Field had developed a new, mechanical gear especially adapted to the Marlin, officially known as the Nelson single shot synchronizer. In place of the push rod common to many mechanical gears, or the "pull rod" of the Sopwith-Kauper, the Nelson gear used a cable held in tension for the transmission of firing impulses to the gun.

Production models were largely too late for use before the end of the First World War, but the Nelson gear became the post-war U.S. standard, as Vickers and Marlin guns were phased out in favour of the Browning .30 calibre machine gun.

==== E-4/E-8 gears ====
The Nelson gear proved reliable and accurate, but it was expensive to produce and the necessity for its cable to be given a straight run could create difficulties when it was to be installed in a new type. By 1929 the latest model (the E-4 gear) had a new and simplified impulse generator, a new trigger motor, and the impulse cable was enclosed in a metal tube, protecting it, and permitting shallow bends. While the basic principle of the new gear remained unchanged: virtually all the components had been redesigned, and it was no longer officially referred to as the "Nelson" gear. The gear was further modernised in 1942 as the E-8. This final model had a modified impulse generator that was easier to adjust and was controlled from the cockpit by an electrical solenoid rather than a Bowden cable.

=== Decline and end of synchronization ===
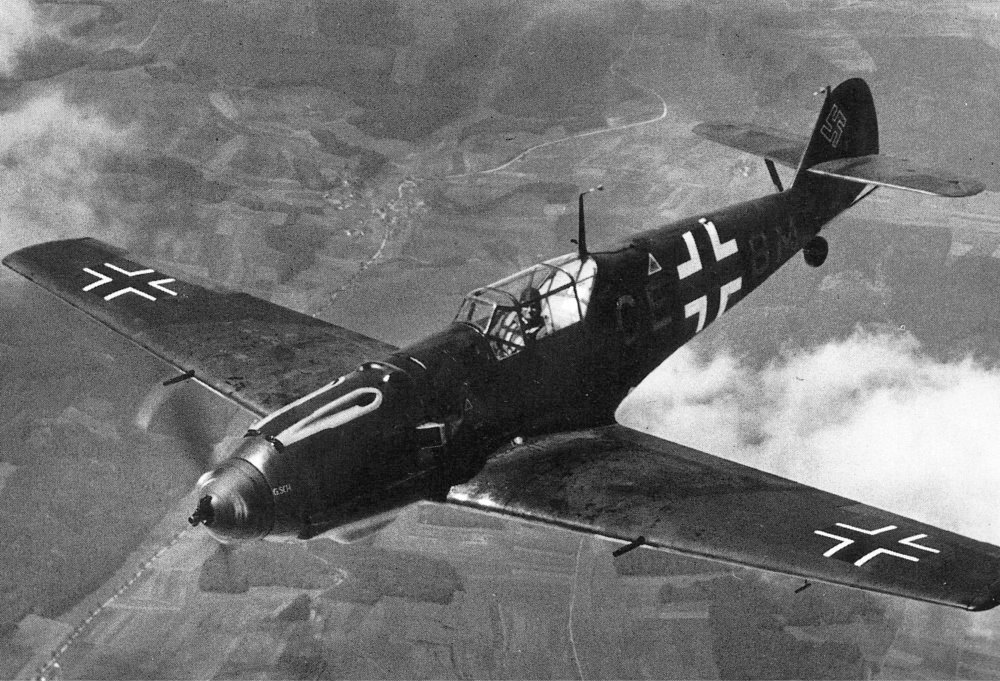
A Messerschmitt Bf 109E showing a traditional pair of synchronized machine guns, a motorkanone firing through the propeller hub and wing guns

The usefulness of synchronization gears naturally disappeared altogether when jet engines eliminated the propeller, at least in fighter aircraft, but gun synchronization, even in single reciprocating engine aircraft, had already been in decline for twenty years prior to this.

The increased speeds of the new monoplanes of the mid to late 1930s meant that the time available to deliver a sufficient weight of fire to bring down an enemy aircraft was greatly reduced. At the same time, the primary vehicle of air power was increasingly seen as the large all-metal bomber: powerful enough to carry armour protection for its vulnerable areas. Two rifle-calibre machine guns were no longer enough, especially for defence planners who anticipated a primarily strategic role for airpower. An effective "anti-bomber" fighter needed something more.

Cantilever monoplane wings provided ample space to mount armaments and, being much more rigid than the old cable-braced wings, they afforded almost as steady a mounting as the fuselage. This new context also made the harmonisation of wing guns more satisfactory, producing a fairly narrow cone of fire in the close to medium ranges at which a fighter's gun armament was most effective.

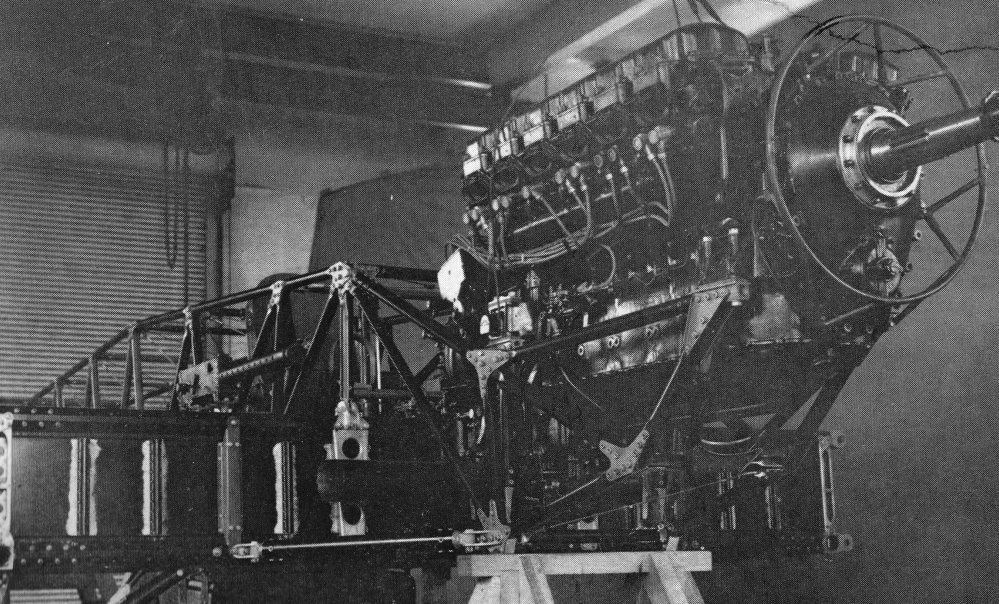
Mockup of the fuselage of Hawker Hurricane prototype – showing the installation of Merlin Engine and originally projected synchronized Vickers machinegun (later deleted)

The retention of fuselage-mounted guns, with the additional weight of their synchronization gear (which slowed their rate of fire, albeit only slightly, and still occasionally failed, resulting in damage to propellers) became increasingly unattractive. This design philosophy, common in Britain and France (and, after 1941, the United States) tended towards eliminating fuselage mounted guns altogether. For example, the original 1934 specifications for the Hawker Hurricane were for a similar armament to the Gloster Gladiator: four machine-guns, two in the wings and two in the fuselage, synchronized to fire through the propeller arc. The illustration opposite is of an early mock-up of the prototype, showing the starboard fuselage gun. The prototype (K5083) as completed had ballast representing this armament; production Hurricane Is, however, were armed with eight guns, all in the wings.

Another approach, common to Germany, the Soviet Union, and Japan, while recognising the necessity to increase armament, preferred a system that included synchronized weapons. Centralised guns had the real advantage that their range was limited only by ballistics, as they did not need the gun harmonisation necessary to concentrate the fire of wing-mounted guns. They were seen as rewarding the true marksman, as they involved less dependence on gun sight technology. Mounting guns in the fuselage also concentrated mass at the centre of gravity, thus improving the fighter's roll ability. More consistent ammunition manufacture, and improved synchronization gear systems made the whole concept more efficient and effective, whilst facilitating its application to weapons of increased calibre such as autocannon; moreover the constant-speed propellers that quickly became standard equipment on WW II fighters meant that the ratio between the propeller speed and the rate of fire of the guns varied less erratically.

The swan-song of synchronization belongs to the last reciprocating engine Soviet fighters, which largely made do with slow firing synchronized cannon throughout the World War II period and after. The very last synchronizer-equipped aircraft to see combat action were the Lavochkin La-11 and the Yakovlev Yak-9 during the Korean War.

== Popular culture ==
The act of shooting one's own propeller is a trope that can be found in comedic gags, like the 1965 cartoon short "Just Plane Beep" starring Wile E. Coyote and the Road Runner. In this film, the attacking Coyote reduces his propeller to splinters after numerous bullets strike.

== See also ==
- Glossary of firearms terms
- Gun harmonisation
- Engine gun

== Bibliography ==
- Barnes, C. H. Bristol Aircraft since 1910. London: Putnam, 1964.
- Bruce, J. M. Sopwith 1½ Strutter. Leatherhead: Profile Publications, 1966.
- Bureau of Aircraft Production. Handbook of Aircraft Armament. Washington: (U.S.) Government Printing Office, 1918.
- Cheesman, E.F.(ed.). Fighter Aircraft of the 1914–1918 War. Letchworth: Harleyford, 1960.
- Courtney, Frank T. The Eighth Sea. New York: Doubleday, 1972
- Fokker, Anthony and Bruce Gould. Flying Dutchman: The Life of Anthony Fokker. London: George Routledge, 1931.
- Galland, Adolf. The First and the Last. London: Methuen, 1956. (A translation of Die Ersten und die Letzten, Berlin: Franz Schneekluth, 1955)
- Goulding, James. Interceptor: RAF Single Seat Multi-Gun Fighters. London: Ian Allan Ltd., 1986. ISBN 0-7110-1583-X.
- Grosz, Peter M., Windsock Mini Datafile 7, Fokker E.IV, Albatros Publications, Ltd. 1996.
- Grosz, Peter M., Windsock Datafile No. 91, Fokker E.I/II, Albatros Publications, Ltd. 2002. ISBN 1-902207-46-7
- Guttman, Jon. The Origin of the Fighter Aircraft. Yardley: Westholme, 2009. ISBN 978-1-59416-083-7
- Hamady, Theodore The Nieuport 28 – America's First Fighter. Atglen, PA: Schiffer Military History, 2008. ISBN 978-0-7643-2933-3
- Hare, Paul R. Mount of Aces – The Royal Aircraft Factory S.E.5a, UK: Fonthill Media, 2013. ISBN 978-1-78155-115-8
- Hegener, Henri. Fokker – the Man and the Aircraft, Letchworth: Harleyford, 1961.
- Jarrett, Philip, "The Fokker Eindeckers", Aeroplane Monthly, December 2004
- Kosin, Rudiger, The German Fighter since 1915, London: Putman, 1988. ISBN 0-85177-822-4 (original German edition 1986)
- Kulikov, Victor, Russian Aces of World War 1. Oxford: Osprey, 2013. ISBN 978-1780960593
- Mason, Francis K., The Hawker Hurricane, London: MacDonald, 1962.
- Mixter, G.W. and H.H. Emmonds. United States Army Production Facts. Washington: Bureau of Aircraft Production, 1919.
- Pengelly, Colin, Albert Ball V.C. The Fighter Pilot of World War I. Barnsley: Pen and Sword, 2010. ISBN 978-184415-904-8
- Robertson, Bruce, Sopwith – the man and his aircraft, Letchworth: Air Review, 1970. ISBN 0 900 435 15 1
- Sweetman, John, Cavalry of the clouds:Air war over Europe 1914–1918, Stroud: Spellmount, 2010. ISBN 978 0 7524 55037
- VanWyngarden, Greg, Early German Aces of World War 1. Oxford: Osprey, 2006. ISBN 978-1-84176-997-4
- Varriale, Paolo, Austro-Hungarian Albatros Aces of World War I. Oxford: Osprey, 2012. ISBN 978-1-84908-747-6
- Volker, Hank. "Synchronizers Parts 1–6" in World War I Aero. (1992–1996), World War I Aeroplanes, Inc.
- Weyl, A. J., Fokker: The Creative Years. London: Putnam, 1965.
- Williams, Anthony G & Dr. Emmanuel Guslin Flying Guns, World War I. Ramsbury, Wilts: Crowood Press, 2003. ISBN 978-1840373967
- Woodman, Harry. Early Aircraft Armament. London: Arms and Armour, 1989 ISBN 0-85368-990-3
- Woodman, Harry, "CC Gun Synchronization Gear", Aeroplane Monthly, September 2005
