= Grand Mosque of Constanța =

Mosque in Constanța, Romania

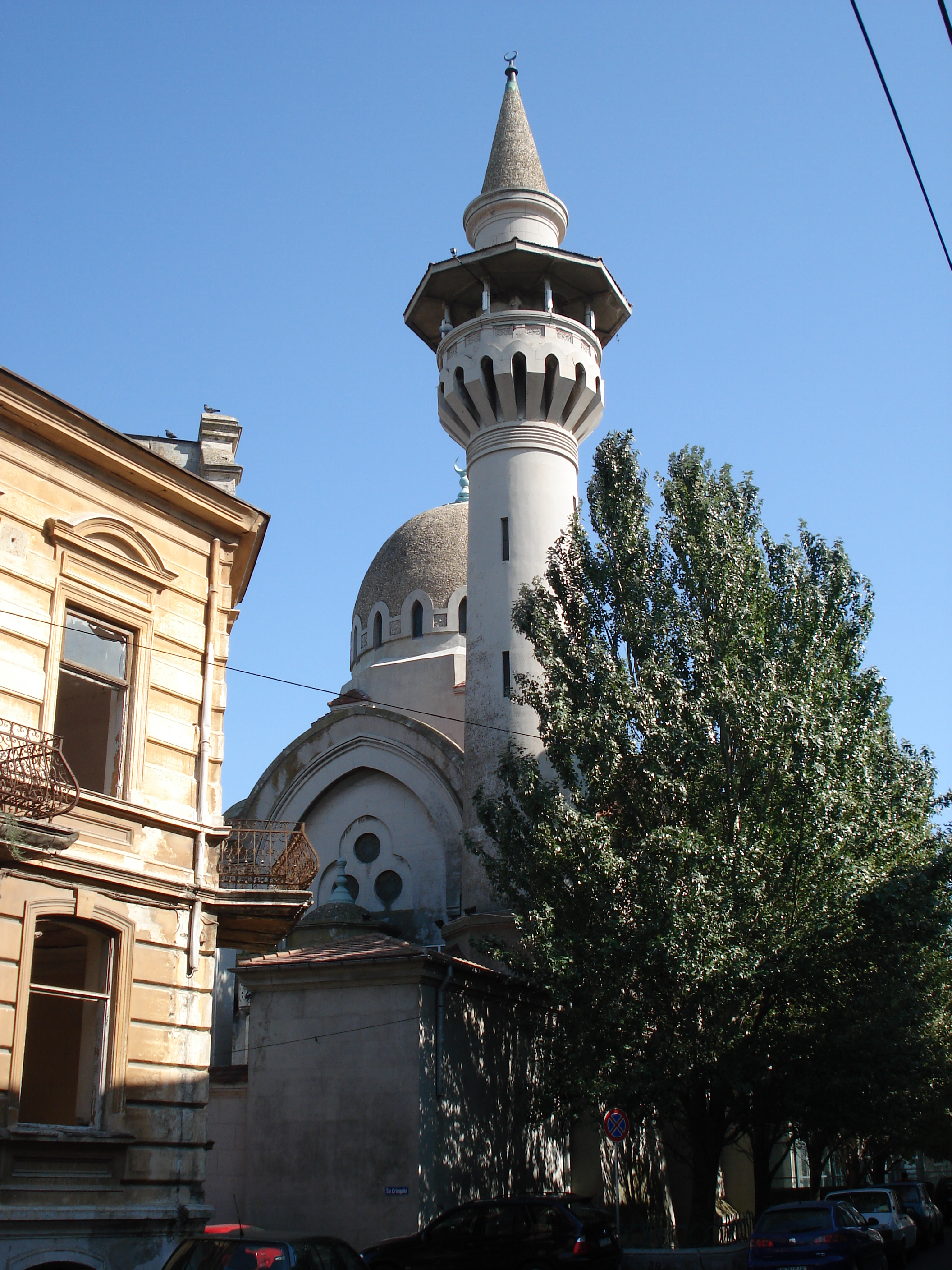

Religion
- Affiliation: Sunni Islam
- Year consecrated: 1913

Location
- Location: 1 Crângului Street; Constanța, Romania
- Interactive map of Grand Mosque of Constanța
- Coordinates: 44°10′24″N 28°39′35″E

Architecture
- Architect: Victor Ștefănescu
- Style: Neo-Egyptian & Neo-Byzantine elements of Neo-Romanesque
- General contractor: George Constantinescu
- Groundbreaking: 24 June 1910
- Completed: 1913

Specifications
- Dome: 1
- Dome height (inner): 25 metres (82 ft)
- Dome dia. (inner): 8 metres (26 ft)
- Minaret: 1
- Minaret height: 47 metres (154 ft)

The Grand Mosque of Constanța (Romanian: Marea Moschee din Constanța), originally known as the Carol I Mosque (Romanian: Moscheea Carol I), is a mosque in Constanța, Romania. It is listed as an historic monument by the Romanian National Institute of Historical Monuments.

The mosque is referred to by Constanța's Islamic community as the King's Mosque (Romanian: Geamia Regelui, Turkish: Kral camisi).

== History ==
The Grand Mosque of Constanța was commissioned in 1910 by Romanian King Carol I. Construction began on 24 June 1910 with the first cornerstone laid in the presence of Spiru Haret, contemporary Romanian Minister of Religious Affairs; Sefa Bey, contemporary Ottoman ambassador in Bucharest; and the Ottoman consul in Constanța. The project was funded by the Romanian Government and entrepreneur Ion Neculcea, and finished construction in 1912.

The Grand Mosque of Constanța stands on the site of the former Mahmudia Mosque (Geamia Mahmudia), built in 1822 by Hafız Hüsseyin Pasha and named after Ottoman Sultan Mahmud II. The mosque was officially inaugurated by Carol I on 31 May 1913. During the ceremony, Sultan Mehmed V bestowed the Order of the Medjidie upon chief architect Victor Ștefănescu. King Carol I also rewarded Ștefănescu with a watch.

== Architecture ==
The mosque was built in Neo-Egyptian and Neo-Byzantine styles with elements of Neo-Romanesque architecture. Its designer, George Constantinescu, modeled the mosque after the Konya Mosque in Anatolia (Turkey). Victor Ștefănescu served as the chief architect for the project. Contractors used brick and stone materials for the mosque proper, and reinforced concrete for the dome and minaret. The mosque was the first structure in Romania to be built using reinforced concrete. The main portal was constructed using stone from Dobrogea, while the door beneath was constructed from black marble inlaid with bronze. The interior columns were constructed from marble from Câmpulung.

The minaret was built in Neo-Moorish style and has a height of 47 metres. The dome has a height of 25 metres and a diameter of 8 metres.

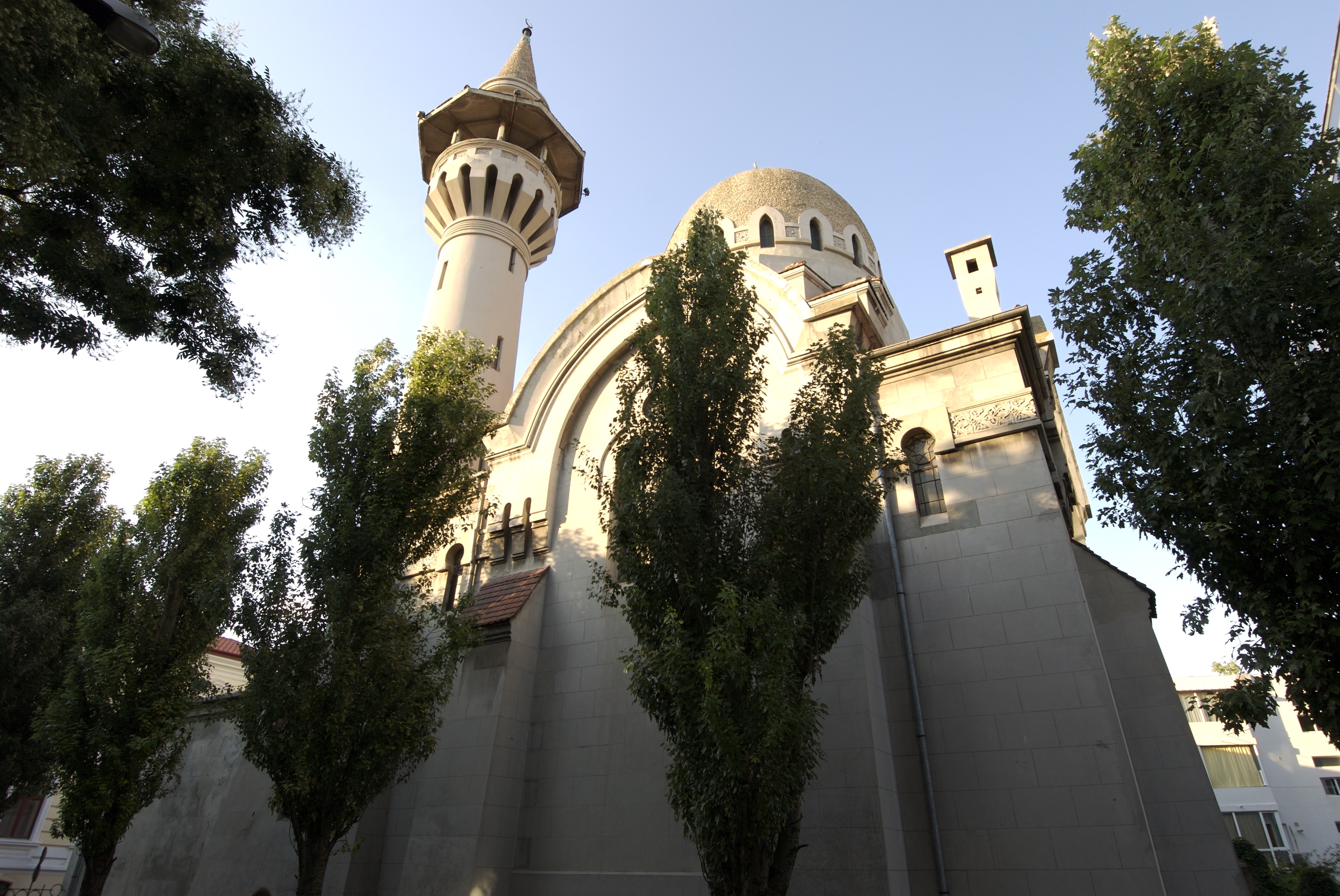

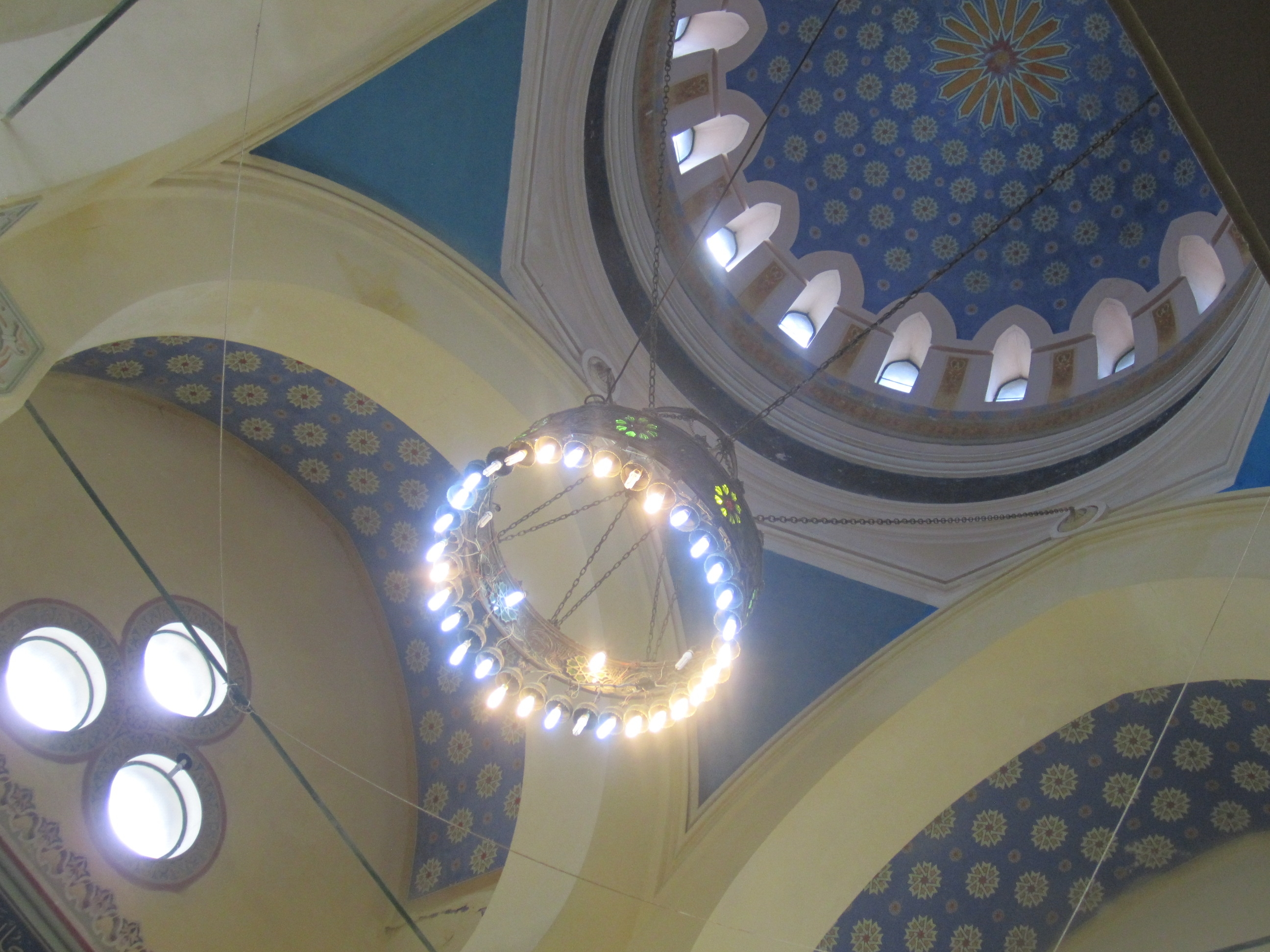

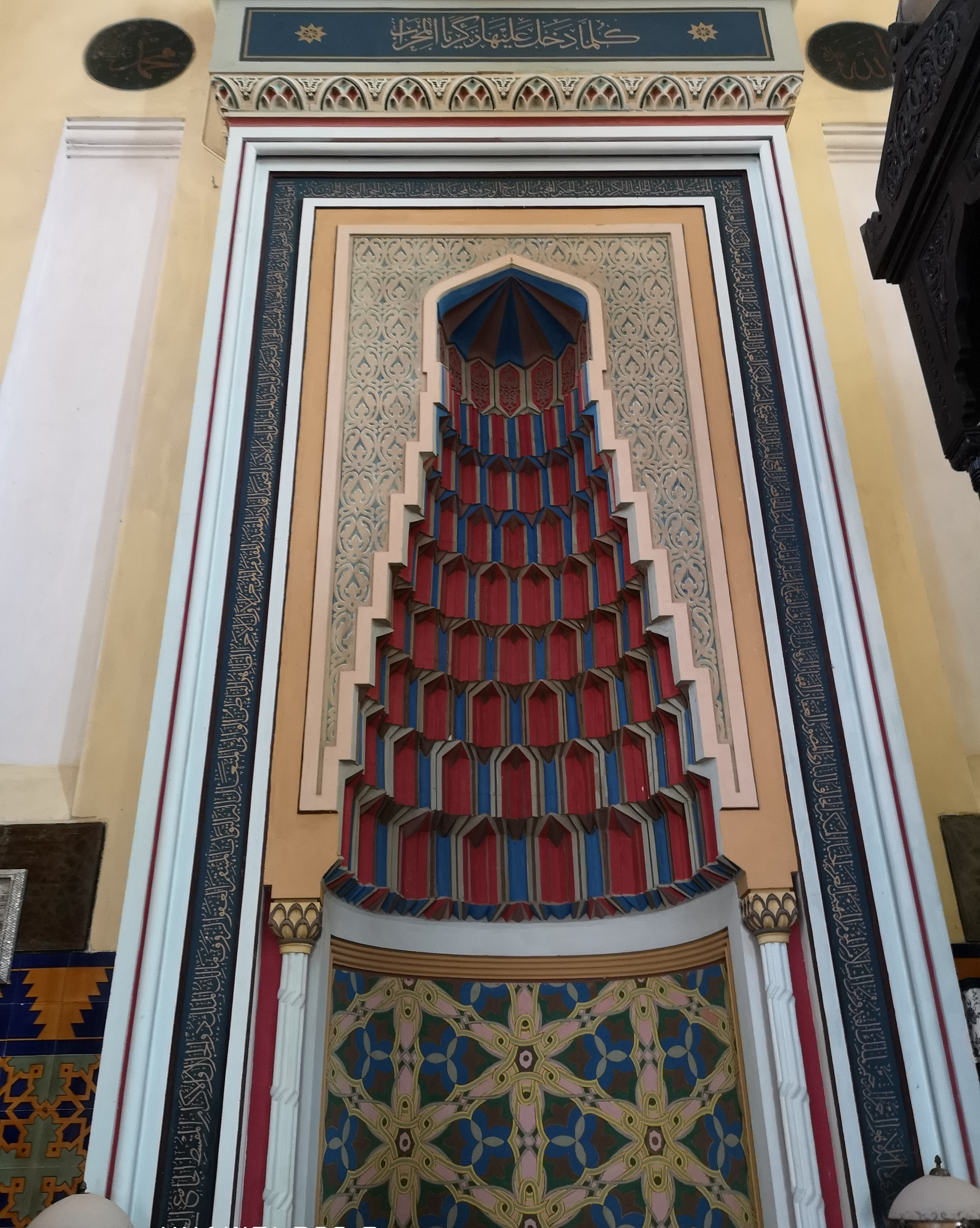
The miḥrāb, indicating the direction towards Mecca
