= Theory of sonics =

The theory of sonics is a branch of continuum mechanics which describes the transmission of mechanical energy through vibrations. The birth of the theory of sonics is the publication of the book A treatise on transmission of power by vibrations in 1918 by the Romanian scientist Gogu Constantinescu.

ONE of the fundamental problems of mechanical engineering is that of transmitting energy found in nature, after suitable transformation, to some point at which can be made available for performing useful work. The methods of transmitting power known and practised by engineers are broadly included in two classes: mechanical including hydraulic, pneumatic and wire rope methods; and electrical methods....According to the new system, energy is transmitted from one point to another, which may be at a considerable distance, by means of impressed variations of pressure or tension producing longitudinal vibrations in solid, liquid or gaseous columns. The energy is transmitted by periodic changes of pressure and volume in the longitudinal direction and may be described as wave transmission of power, or mechanical wave transmission. – Gogu Constantinescu

Later on the theory was expanded in electro-sonic, hydro-sonic, sonostereo-sonic and thermo-sonic. The theory was the first chapter of compressible flow applications and has stated for the first time the mathematical theory of compressible fluid, and was considered a branch of continuum mechanics. The laws discovered by Constantinescu, used in sonicity are the same with the laws used in electricity.

== Book chapters ==
The book A treatise on transmission of power by vibrations has the following chapters:

1. Introductory
2. Elementary physical principles
3. Definitions
4. Effects of capacity, inertia, friction, and leakage on alternating currents
5. Waves in long pipes
6. Alternating in long pipes allowing for Friction
7. Theory of displacements – motors
8. Theory of resonators
9. High-frequency currents
10. Charged lines
11. Transformers

George Constantinescu defined his work as follow.

== Theory of sonics: applications ==
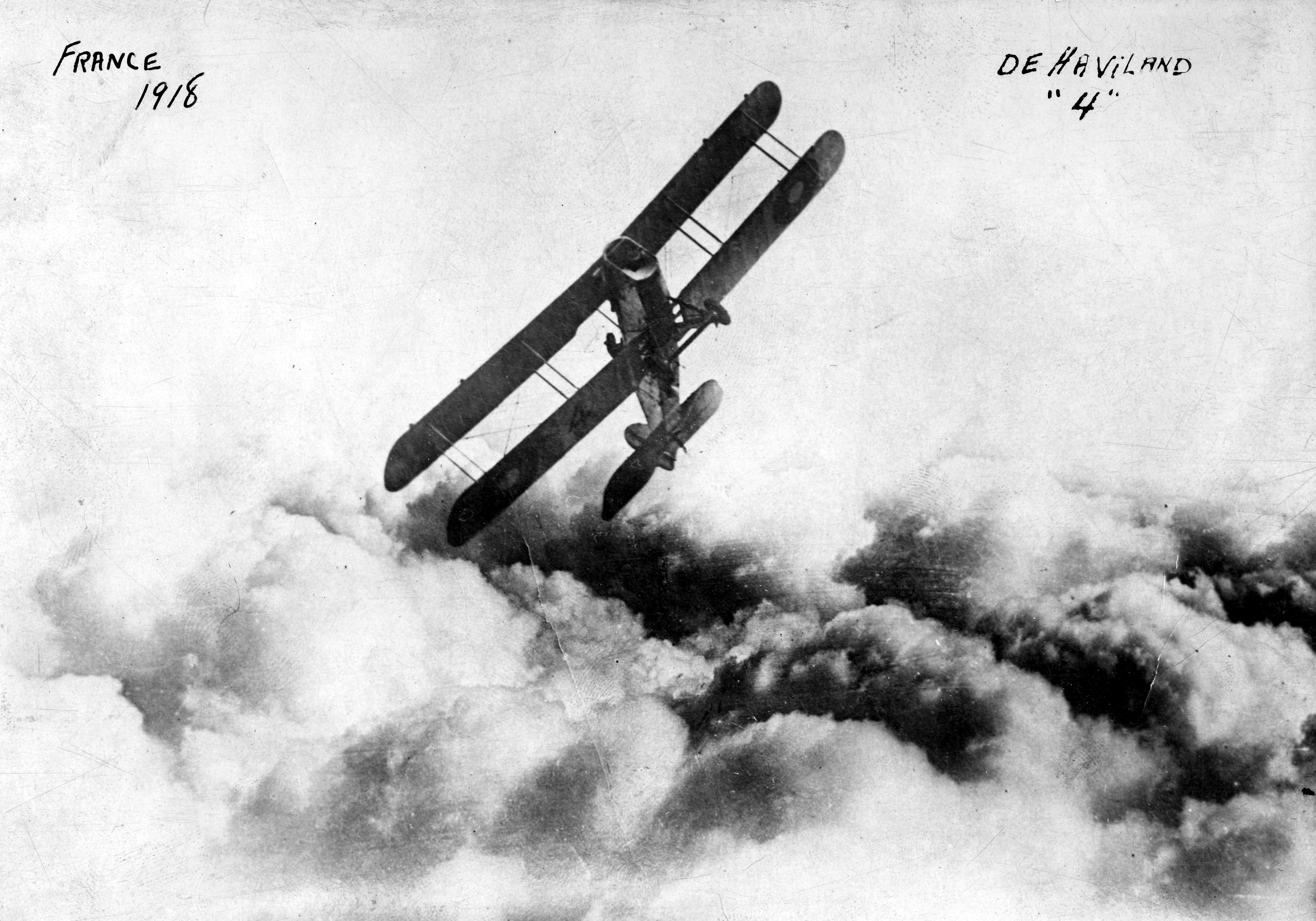
No. 55 squadron of DH4s, the first aircraft to go into active service fitted with the C.C. Gear, arrived in France on 6 March 1917.

- The Constantinesco synchronization gear, used on military aircraft in order to allow them to target opponents without damaging their own propellers.
- Automatic gear
- Sonic Drilling, was one of the first applications developed by Constantinescu. A sonic drill head works by sending high frequency resonant vibrations down the drill string to the drill bit, while the operator controls these frequencies to suit the specific conditions of the soil/rock geology.
- Torque Converter. A mechanical application of sonic theory on the transmission of power by vibrations. Power is transmitted from the engine to the output shaft through a system of oscillating levers and inertias.
- Sonic Engine

== Elementary physical principles ==
If v is the velocity of which waves travel along the pipe, and n the number of the revolutions of the crank a, then the wavelength λ is:

$\lambda = \frac{v}{n}\,$
Assuming that the pipe is finite and closed at the point r situated at a distance which is multiple of λ, and considering that the piston is smaller than wavelength, at r the wave compression is stopped and reflected, the reflected wave traveling back along the pipe.

Physics
Elementary physical principles	Description
Figure I Suppose the crank a to be rotating uniformly, causing the piston b to reciprocate in the pipe c, which is full of liquid. At each in stroke of the piston a zone of high pressure is formed, and these zones, shown by shading, travel along the pipe away from the piston; between every pair of high pressures zones is a zone of low pressure shown in the picture. The pressure at any point in the pipe will go through a series of values from a maximum to a minimum.
Figure II Assuming that the pipe is finite and closed at the point r situated at a distance which is a multiple of λ, and considering that the piston is smaller than the wavelength, at r the wave compression is stopped and reflected, the reflected wave traveling back along the pipe. If the crank continues rotation at a uniform speed, a zone of maximum pressure will start from the piston at the same time the reflected wave returns to the piston. As a result, the maximum pressure will double. At the next rotation the amplitude is increased, and so on, until the pipe bursts.
Figure III If instead of a closed end we have a piston at r; the wave will be similar at piston b and piston m, the piston m therefore will have the same energy as the piston b; if the distance between the b and m is not a multiple of λ, the movement of m will differ in phase compared with the piston b.
Figure IV If more energy is produced by piston b than is taken by piston m, the energy will be reflected by piston m in the pipe, and the energy will accumulate until the pipe bursts. If we have a vessel d, with a large volume compared with the stroke volume of piston b, the capacity d will act as a spring storing the energy of direct or reflected waves at high pressure, and giving back energy when the pressure falls. The mean pressure in d and in the pipe will be the same, but the pipe will have a stationary wave as a result of the reflected waves with no increase of energy, and the pressure in the pipe will never exceed the pressure limit.
Figure V Waves are transmitted by a reciprocating piston along the pipe eeee. The pipe is closed at p, a distance of one complete wavelength. There are branches b, c, and d at distances of one-half, three-quarters and one full wavelength, respectively. If p is open and d is open, the motor l will rotate synchronous with motor a. If all valves are closed, there will be a stationary wave with extreme values at λ and λ/2, (points b and d,) where the flow will be zero, and where the pressure will alternate between maximum and minimum values determined by the capacity of the reservoir f. The maximum and minimum points do not move along the pipe, and no energy flows from generator a. If valve b is open, the motor m is able to take the energy from the line, the stationary half-wave between a and b being replaced by a traveling wave; between b and p a stationary wave will persist. If only valve c is open, since at this point the variation of pressure is always zero, no energy can be taken out by the motor n, and the stationary wave will persist. If the motor is connected in an intermediary point, part of the energy will be taken out by the motor while the stationary wave will persist at reduced amplitude. If the motor l is not capable of consuming all the energy of the generator a, then there will be a combination of traveling waves and stationary waves. Therefore, there will be no point in the pipe where the pressure variation will be zero, and consequently, a motor connected at any point of the pipe will be able to use a portion of generated energy.

== Definitions ==
=== Alternating fluid currents ===
Considering any flow or pipes, if:

ω = the area section of the pipe measured in square centimeters;
v = the velocity of the fluid at any moment in centimeters per second;

and

i = the flow of liquid in cubic centimeters per second,

then we have:

i = vω

Assuming that the fluid current is produced by a piston having a simple harmonic movement, in a piston cylinder having a section of Ω square centimeters. If we have:

r = the equivalent of driving crank in centimeters
a = the angular velocity of the crank or the pulsations in radians per second.
n = the number of crank rotations per second.

Then:

The flow from the cylinder to the pipe is: i = I sin(at+φ)

Where:

I = raΩ (the maximum alternating flow in square centimeters per second; the amplitude of the flow.)
t = time in seconds
φ = the angle of the phase

If T= period of a complete alternation (one revolution of the crank) then:

a = 2πn; where n = 1/T

The effective current can be defined by the equation:

$I_{eff}^2= \frac{1}{T}\int\limits_{0}^{T}i^2\,dt$ and the effective velocity is : $v_{eff}= \frac{I_{eff}}{\omega}$

The stroke volume δ will be given by the relation:

$$\delta = 2r\Omega = 2\frac{I}{a}$$

== Alternating pressures ==
The alternating pressures are very similar to alternating currents in electricity. In a pipe where the currents are flowing, we will have:

$p = H \sin{(at+\Phi)}+p_m$; where H is the maximum alternating pressure measured in kilograms per square centimeter. $\Phi =$ the angle of phase; $p_m$ representing the mean pressure in the pipe.

Considering the above formulas:

the minimum pressure is $P_{min} =P_m -H$ and maximum pressure is $P_{max} =P_m +H$

If p_{1} is the pressure at an arbitrary point and p_{2} pressure in another arbitrary point:

The difference $h =p_1-p_2 = H\sin{(at+\Phi)}$ is defined as instantaneous hydromotive force between point p_{1} and p_{2}, H representing the amplitude.

The effective hydromotive force will be: $H_{eff} = \frac{H}{\sqrt{2}}$

== Friction ==
In alternating current flowing through a pipe, there is friction at the surface of the pipe and also in the liquid itself. Therefore, the relation between the hydromotive force and current can be written as:

$H =Ri$; where R = coefficient of friction in $\frac{kg.sec.}{cm.^5}$

Using experiments R may be calculated from formula:

$$R = \epsilon \frac{\gamma l v_{eff}}{2g \omega d}$$;

Where:

- $\gamma$ is the density of the liquid in kg per cm.^{3}
- l is the length of the pipe in cm.
- g is the gravitational acceleration in cm. per sec.^{2}
- $\omega$ is the section of the pipe in square centimeters.
- v_{eff} is the effective velocity
- d is the internal diameter of the pipe in centimeters.
- $\epsilon =0.02 + \frac{0.18}{\sqrt{v_{eff}d}}$ for water (an approximation from experimental data).
- h is the instantaneous hydromotive force

If we introduce $\epsilon$ in the formula, we get:

$R = \frac{\gamma l}{g \omega} \big( 0.01 \frac{v}{d}+ \frac{0.09}{d} \sqrt{ \frac{v_{eff}}{d}} \big)$ which is equivalent to:
$100k = \frac{v_{eff}}{d} + \frac{9}{d} \sqrt{\frac{v_{eff}}{d}} =\frac{v_{eff}}{d}\big( 1+\frac{9}{v_{eff}} \sqrt{\frac{v_{eff}}{d}} \big)$; introducing k in the formula results in $R = k\frac{\gamma l}{g \omega}$

For pipes with a greater diameter, a greater velocity can be achieved for same value of k. The loss of power due to friction is calculated by:

$W = \frac{1}{T} \int_0^T hi\,dt$, putting h = Ri results in:
$$W =  \frac{1}{T} \int_0^T Ri^2\,dt=\frac{R}{T} \int_0^T i^2\,dt=\frac{RI^2}{2}$$
Therefore: $W =\frac{RI^2}{2}=\frac{HI}{2}=H_{eff}\times I_{eff}$

== Capacity and condensers ==
Definition: Hydraulic condensers are appliances for making alterations in value of fluid currents, pressures or phases of alternating fluid currents. The apparatus usually consists of a mobile solid body, which divides the liquid column, and is fixed elastically in a middle position such that it follows the movements of the liquid column.

The principal function of hydraulic condensers is to counteract inertia effects due to moving masses.

Hydraulic Condenser Drawing	Theory
Hydraulic Condenser Example Hooke's law for spring $F = m \frac{\mathrm{d}^2x}{\mathrm{d}t^2} = -k x$; in this case x=f=piston movement. Simple Harmonic The principal function of hydraulic condensers is to counteract inertial effects due to moving masses. The capacity C of a condenser consisting of a piston of section ω on which the liquid pressure is acting, held in a mean position by means of springs, is given by the equation: ΔV = ωΔf = CΔp where: ΔV = the variation of volume for the given liquid; Δf = the variation of the longitudinal position of the piston, and Δp = the variation of the pressure in the liquid. If the piston is held by a spring at any given moment: f = AF where A = a constant depending on the spring and F = the force acting on the spring. In the condenser we will have: ΔF = ωΔp and Δf = AωΔp Considering the above equations: C = Aω^{2} and $$F =\frac{f}{A}=\frac{f\omega}{C}$$ For a spring wire of circular section: $$B= Ff$$ Where B is the volume of spring in cubic centimeters and σ is the allowable stress of metal in kilograms per square centimeter. G is the coefficient of transverse elasticity of the metal. Therefore: B = mFf m being a constant depending on σ and G. If d is the diameter of the spring wire and the D the mean diameter of the spring. Then: $$F=0.4\frac{d^3}{D}\sigma$$ so that: $$d=\sqrt[3]{\frac{FD}{0.4\sigma} }$$ if we consider ::$n=\sqrt[3]{\frac{1}{0.4\sigma} }$ then: $$d=n\sqrt[3]{FD}$$ The above equations are used in order to calculate the springs required for a condenser of a given capacity required to work at a given maximum stress.
