= Gosavianadzor =

Gosavianadzor (Госавианадзор) can refer to:

- The State Aviation Safety Supervision Agency, a division of the Federal Service for Supervision of Transport
- State Supervisory Commission for Flight Safety of the Soviet Union
