= Albert Plesman =

Dutch aviation pioneer (1889–1953)

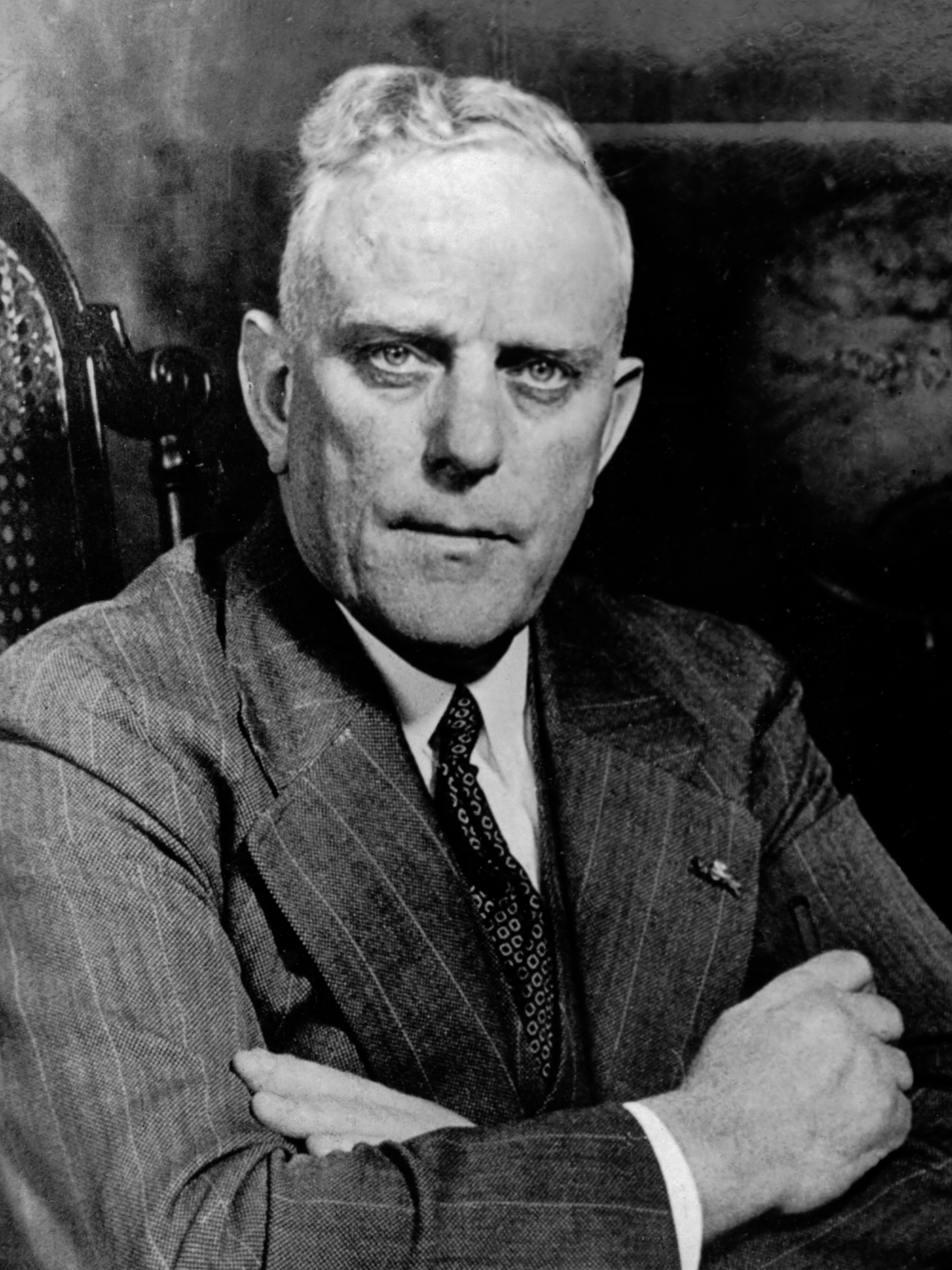
Albert Plesman (1953)

Albert Plesman (7 September 1889 – 31 December 1953) was a Dutch pioneer in aviation and the first administrator and later director of the KLM, the oldest airline in the world still operating under its original name. Until his death, he was its CEO for over 35 years and was also on the board of the Dutch airline, which was to become one of the most important airlines in the world under his leadership.

He was born as the son of an egg trader from The Hague. In 1915 he joined the mobilized Dutch airforce as an officer, at the time still called the "militaire luchtvaartafdeling" (military aviation department), in Soesterberg. After World War I, in which the Netherlands remained neutral, he started the organization of ELTA, the "Eerste Luchtverkeer Tentoonstelling Amsterdam" (First Aviation Exhibition Amsterdam), held from 1 August until 14 September 1919. For that occasion enormous halls (hangars) were built. Right after the exhibition, these were used by Anthony Fokker, for his new company, Nederlandse Vliegtuigenfabriek (Dutch Aircraft Factory), subsequently the Fokker airplane factory.

All these activities led to the establishment of Royal Dutch Airlines (KLM), of which Plesman became director and made a flourishing company. After World War II, Plesman was appointed president-director of KLM. After recovering from the war, KLM became a renowned airline company under his leadership. On 25 February 1946, KLM had the first airline flights from continental Europe to the USA. For his efforts, he received in 1947 an honorary doctorate of the Technical University of Delft. Plesman pleaded in vain for a displacement of Schiphol Airport to a location near Burgerveen. The father of KLM died in The Hague on December 31, 1953, at age 64.

== Biography ==
Albert Plesman was born on 7 September 1889, to Johan Cornelis Plesman, an egg trader from The Hague and Hendrika van Wessel, one of seven children. He was raised in a Protestant household under the strict rule of his father. He was known to have episodes of obscure or sporadic behavior. These episodes led him to attending the Hogere Burgerschool, a preparatory academy in The Hague. Albert realized great strengths in mathematics during his time at the school, which spawned an interest in commercial aviation.

Upon the death of his mother and his graduation from Hogere Burgerschool, Plesman enrolled in the Alkmaar Cadet School for service in Royal Dutch East Indies Army. He then attended the Royal Military Academy in Breda, Netherlands, where he first explored his interest in aviation through access to the Gilze-Rijen airfield. Plesman then began his service as a 2nd lieutenant where his access to aviation expanded. He was exposed to a lieutenant pilot named W. C. J. Versteegh, who flew a Farman F.20. Plesman was able to explore his desire to fly through Verstegh. Plesman officially became a student cadet of flight in April 1917.

Albert Plesman met Susanna Jacoba van Eijk in early 1917, whom he later married in December of that year. They had three sons and a daughter. He was recalled as a great family man who realized the importance in family togetherness. He would regularly bring his children to important meetings and events within his company, which was a generally uncommon practice for his socioeconomic stature.

== Aviation career ==
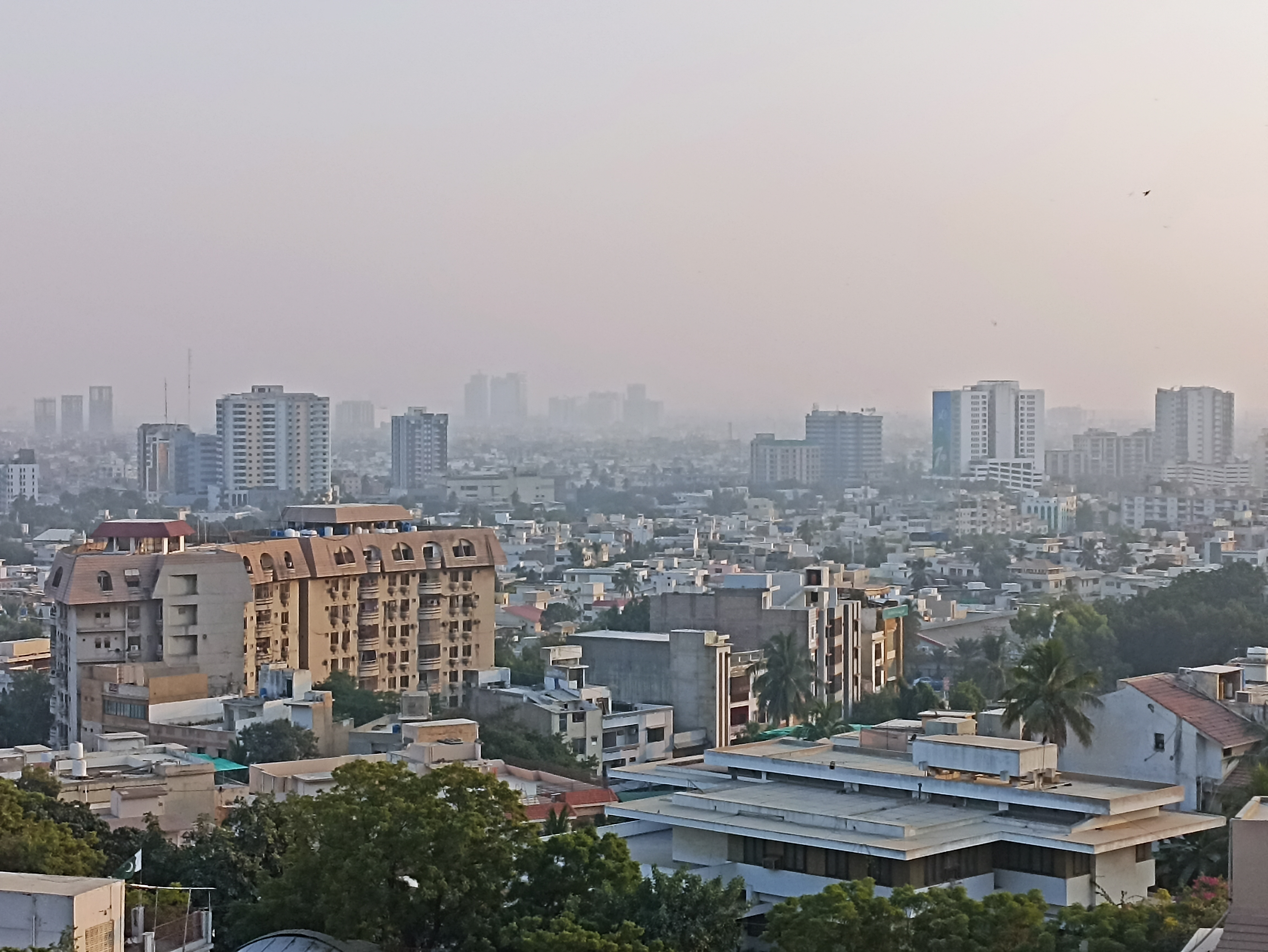
Karachi was a major half-way point on the KLM first flight

Albert Plesman, together with Anthony Fokker, brought into existence two great aviation companies in Europe: KLM and Fokker. Europe realized greater connections with North America through Plesman's influence, pioneering the first commercial transatlantic services. Cargo, mail, and passenger services were greatly a result of Plesman's work within KLM.

KLM's first revenue flight operated from London's Croydon Airport to Amsterdam Airport Schiphol. KLM leased their first aircraft, but quickly utilized Fokker. These Fokker aircraft were a product of Anthony Fokker and Albert Plesman's leadership. Their operation of aircraft production followed by the commercial use of those aircraft allowed for a huge growth in travel for Europe internally, to North America, and to the Southeast Asian Dutch colonies. Albert Plesman later established, in 1921, the largest aircraft maintenance and overhaul plant in the world. This plant was located onsite at Amsterdam Airport Schiphol, where KLM concentrated most of their operations. Plesman laid ground for the new KLM headquarters in The Hague during 1939. Plesman advertised progressive business principles for KLM - "a commitment to generating customer preference by offering a high-quality product at a reasonable price; strengthening market presence; and achieving internationally competitive costs coupled with a sound financial basis." KLM then transitioned from the wooden Fokker airplanes to metal aircraft manufactured in the United States, per Plesman's discretion.

In the latter part of 1939, Albert Plesman was forced to suspend all of KLM's operations with the advent of the Second World War. His aircraft were withheld, and Amsterdam Airport Schiphol was reserved exclusively for military use. He resumed operations in 1946. When KLM was revived, he became president of the company and conducted the integration of Douglas aircraft. He also allowed for greater nationalization of the airline and oversaw the Dutch government's purchase of shares in KLM.

He published a small book, Plan for international cooperation, possibly in 1950.

Albert Plesman died on December 31, 1953. He left the company in the hands of Fons Aler. The airline continued to grow despite economic difficulties in the late 1950s due to the Dutch government's growing ownership of the company.

== Awards and honors ==
- Knight of the Order of Orange-Nassau (1925)
- Officer of the Order of Orange-Nassau (1931)
- Knight of the Order of the Netherlands Lion (1934)
- Commander of the Order of Orange-Nassau (1949, at the 30th anniversary of KLM)
- Knight of the Order of the Dannebrog (Denmark, 1931)
- Officer of the Order of Leopold II (Belgium, 1932)
- Officer of the Order of Vasa (Sweden, 1932)
- Commander of the Order of Leopold II (Belgium, 1935)
- Commander of the Order of the White Lion (Czechoslovak, 1935)
- Honorary doctorate from the Technical University of Delft (1947)
- The first Edward Warner Award, for his achievements for international civil aviation (International Civil Aviation Organization, posthumously, 1959)
- C.J. Snijders Medal

== Television series ==
Turbulent Skies is a 2020 Dutch television series comprising eight episodes depicting Plesman and Anthony Fokker's achievements.
