= Edward Warner Award =

The Edward Warner Award is an award that's given in the field of aviation to aviation pioneers or organizations that have contributed to civil aviation. The award is named after Edward Pearson Warner, the first President of the council of ICAO.

The award consists of two items: a medal and a certificate. The medal is made of solid gold and is inscribed with the recipient's name. The certificate is a recognition citing the reasons for the award. The Edward Warner Award is recognized throughout the world as the greatest single honour the international civil aviation community can bestow, for its importance is derived from the fact that it is given by ICAO on behalf of its Member States. No other international civil aviation award offers such wide recognition.

== Recipients ==
- 1959: Albert Plesman (Netherlands)
- 1961: International Aeronautical Federation
- 1963: Max Hymans (France)
- 1965: William Hildred (United Kingdom)
- 1968: Henri Bouché (France)
- 1971: Ruben Martin Berta (Brazil)
- 1972: ASECNA, Agence pour la Sécurité de la Navigation aérienne en Afrique et à Madagascar
- 1973: Shizuma Matsuo (Japan)
- 1974: Alex Meyer (West Germany)
- 1975: Charles Lindbergh (United States)
- 1976: COCESNA, Corporación Centroamericana de Servicios de Navegación Aérea
- 1977: Mohammed Soliman El Hakim (Egypt)
- 1978: Don Anderson (Australia)
- 1979: Agnar Kofoed-Hansen (Iceland)
- 1980: Indalecio Rego Fernandez (Spain)
- 1981: Harry George Armstrong (United States)
- 1982: Werner Guldimann (Switzerland)
- 1983: Knut Hammarskjöld (Sweden)
- 1984: Maurice Bellonte (France)
- 1985: Alexandr Fedotovich Aksenov (Soviet Union)
- 1986: J.R.D. Tata (India)
- 1988: Aeronautical Radio of Thailand (AEROTHAI)
- 1989: Anesia Pinheiro Machado (Brazil)
- 1990: Igor Ivanovich Sikorsky (United States)
- 1991: Bill Bradfield (Australia)
- 1992: Edward R. K. Dwemoh (Ghana)
- 1993: Arnold W. G. Kean (United Kingdom)
- 1994: B. J. Habibie (Indonesia)
- 1995: Elrey Borge Jeppesen (United States)
- 1996: The Institute of Air and Space Law of McGill University (Canada)
- 1997: Tatiana Anodina (Russia)
- 1998: Kenneth Rattray (Jamaica)
- 1999: Jerome F. Lederer (United States)
- 2000: Singapore Aviation Academy (SAA)
- 2001: Petro Balabuyev (Ukraine)
- 2002: International Academy of Aviation and Space Medicine (IAASM)
- 2004: Brian O'Keeffe (Australia)
- 2007: Silvio Finkelstein (Argentina)
- 2010: Nicolas Mateesco Matte (Romania)
- 2013: Assad Kotaite (Lebanon)
- 2016: David Ronald de Mey Warren (Australia)
- 2019: Roberto Kobeh González (Mexico)
- 2022: Ángela Marina Donato (Argentina)

== See also ==
- List of aviation awards
