= Permanent Representative of Australia to the International Civil Aviation Organization =

- Incumbent; Ross Adams since September 2021
- Department of Infrastructure, Transport, Regional Development, Communications and the Arts
- Style: His Excellency
- Reports to: Minister for Infrastructure, Transport, Regional Development and Local Government
- Residence: Montreal, Canada
- Nominator: Prime Minister of Australia
- Appointer: Governor General of Australia
- Inaugural holder: Arthur Rowland McComb
- Formation: 6 June 1945
- Website: Australian Government involvement in ICAO groups

The permanent representative of Australia to the International Civil Aviation Organization is an officer of the Australian Department of Infrastructure, Transport, Regional Development, Communications and the Arts and the head of the delegation of the Commonwealth of Australia to the Council of the International Civil Aviation Organization (ICAO) in Montreal, Canada. The position has the rank and status of an ambassador extraordinary and plenipotentiary and is one of Australia's representatives to the United Nations and its other constituent agencies. The Australian nominee to the Air Navigation Commission, a body that works towards the uniformity in regulations, standards and procedures which will facilitate and improve air navigation to international standards, acts as the deputy to the Permanent Representative.

The current permanent representative is Ross Adams since September 2021.

Australia has been a member of ICAO since its establishment, with the permanent mission based in Montreal, now at 999 Robert-Bourassa Boulevard. Australia sent a delegation to the 1944 Chicago Conference, and became a party of the Convention on International Civil Aviation which was resolved at its end on 7 December 1944. Australian first sent a permanent representative to serve on the Council of the Provisional International Civil Aviation Organization (PICAO) which began operating on 6 June 1945 and was replaced by ICAO on 7 April 1947.

== List of permanent representatives ==
#	Officeholder	Term start date	Term end date	Time in office	Notes
1	Arthur Rowland McComb	6 June 1945	August 1947	2 years, 1 month	
2	Bill Bradfield	August 1947	July 1952	4 years, 11 months	
3	Jim Stone	July 1952	1956	3–4 years	
4	A Hepburn	1957	1958	1–2 years	
5	David Medley	1958	1962	3–4 years	
6	JT Fogarty	1963	1965		
7	Jim Stone	1965	1968	2–3 years	
8	Bill Bradfield	1968	1972	3–4 years	
9	Byron Lewis	1972	1975	2–3 years	
10	Reg Gross	1975	1981	5–6 years	
11	George Birch	1981	1984	2–3 years	
12	Jack Sansom	1984	1988	3–4 years	
13	Bruce Weedon	1988	1992		
14	Jim Webber	1992	1995		
15	JL Manning	1995	1998		
16	Jonathan Aleck	September 1998	August 2003	4 years, 11 months	
17	Simon Clegg	2003	2008	4–5 years	
18	Peter Evans	2008	November 2010	1–2 years	
19	Kerryn Macaulay	November 2010	October 2016	5 years, 11 months	
20	Samuel Lucas	October 2016	September 2021	4 years, 11 months	
21	Ross Adams	September 2021	Incumbent	5 years	

== See also ==
- Australia and the United Nations
