= Tatiana Anodina =

Russian aviation engineer

Dr. Tatiana G. Anodina
- Татьяна Григорьевна Анодина
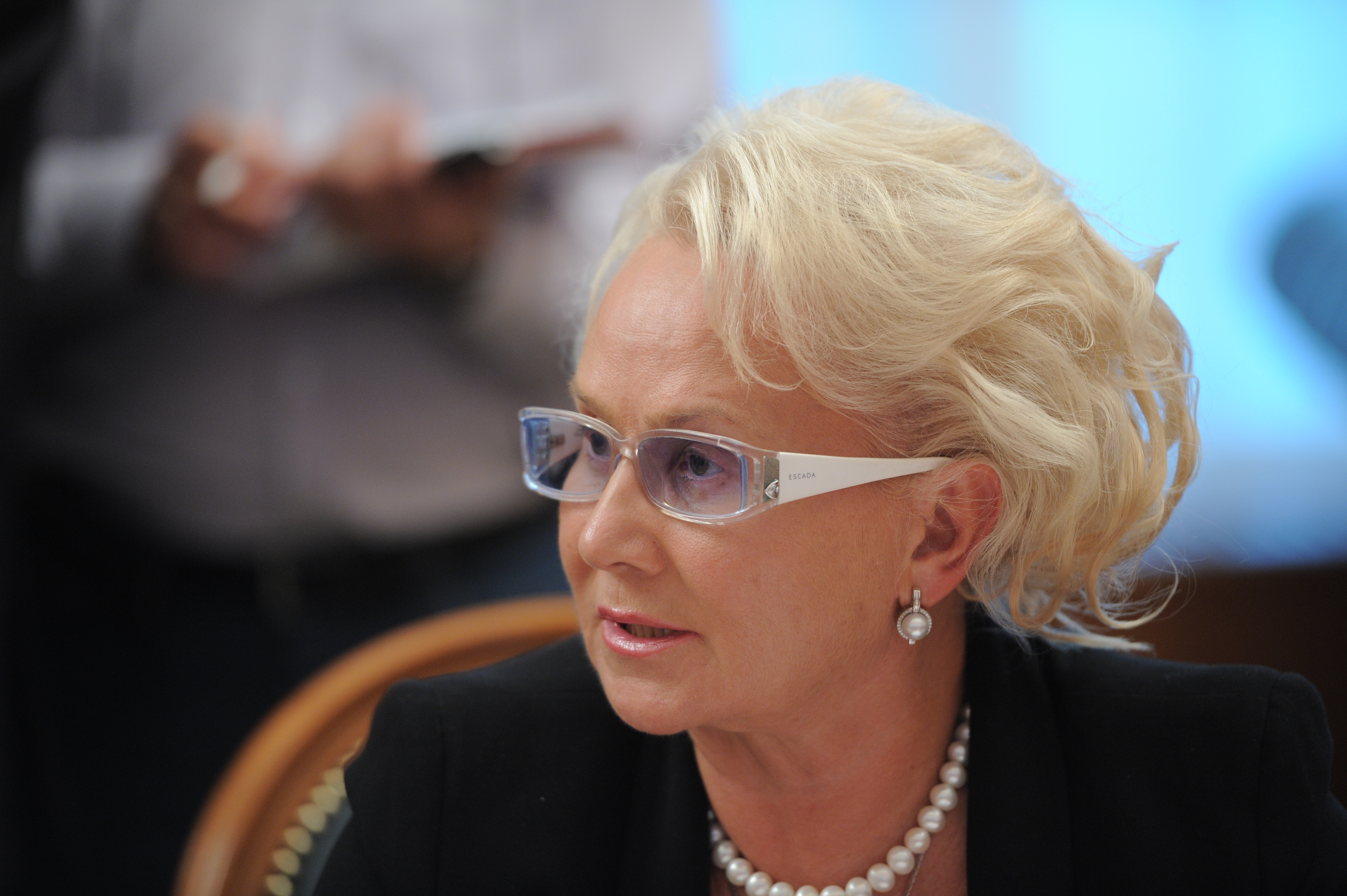
- Anodina in 2011
- Born: 16 April 1939 (age 87); Leningrad, USSR
- Citizenship: Soviet Union
- Education: Lviv Polytechnical Institute (1929)
- Occupations: Scientist; Engineer
- Years active: 1961–present
- Known for: founder and long-time chairperson of the Interstate Aviation Committee
- Title: Doctor of Engineering; Professor
- Spouse: Pyotr S. Pleshakov
- Awards: USSR State Prize (1979); Edward Warner Award (1997)

Signature
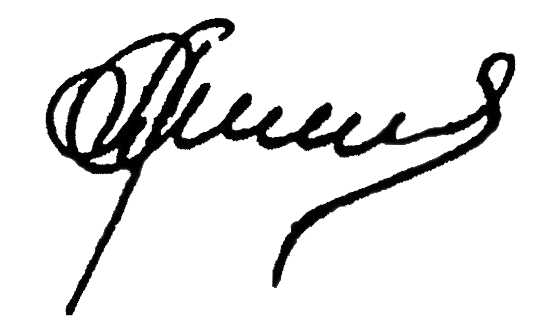

Tatiana Grigorievna Anodina (Russian: Татья́на Григо́рьевна Ано́дина; born April 16, 1939, in Leningrad). From 1991 to 2023, she headed of the Interstate Aviation Committee — the civil aviation oversight body in Russia and some other states of the former Soviet Union. A career aviation engineer, she has been leading the Committee since its foundation in 1991.

Anodina's son and his family owned and controlled Transaero, one of Russia's largest airlines until its demise in October 2015. There had been press speculation regarding Anodina's conflict of interest in certifying aircraft with respect to Transaero's market position.

== Biography ==
Anodina was born on 16 April 1939 in Leningrad (then Soviet Union) to a family of a Soviet Air Forces pilot. She graduated from the Lviv Polytechnic Institute in 1961, qualifying as an engineer. After graduation she worked in civil aviation at the State Institute of Civil Aviation, the leading research institution in Soviet Union for civil aviation. She made her career at the institute, working on automatic systems of navigation, and was eventually appointed the director. In the 1970s, she was transferred to the Ministry of Civil Aviation, where she became director of the technical division.

She married Pyotr Pleshakov, a Soviet military engineer, who was later promoted to Colonel General. He was subsequently the Soviet Union's Minister of Radioelectronic Industry from 1974 till 1987.

From 1991 to 2023, she held the position of chairperson of the Interstate Aviation Committee.

== Degrees and awards ==
Tatiana Anodina holds a degree of Doctor of Sciences and is the author of over 100 research papers on aeronautical engineering specializing in communications. In 1979, Anodina was awarded, along with other researchers, a State Prize of the Soviet Union for the development of a novel radar systems for air traffic control.

In 1997, Anodina received the Edward Warner Award from ICAO "in recognition of her eminent contribution, as scientist and researcher, to the development of national, regional and global air navigation aids for civil aviation at the international level"

In January 2023, the title of honorary President of the Council for Aviation and the Use of Airspace with the right of advisory vote were offered to her.
