= Bill Bradfield =

Australian civil engineer (1910–2006)

Dr. Bill Bradfield OBE FIEAust
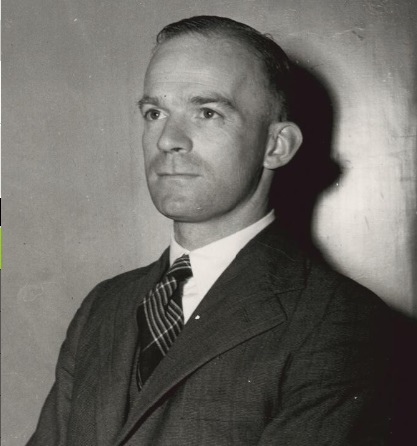
- Born: 25 December 1910; Gordon, Sydney, Australia
- Died: 12 June 2006 (aged 95); Sydney, Australia
- Education: University of Sydney (BSc, B.E.Hons.); New College, Oxford (D.Phil.)
- Parent: John Bradfield
- Engineering career
- Discipline: Aerospace engineering Civil engineering
- Institutions: Institution of Engineers Australia (Fellow)
- Employers: Department of Civil Aviation; Government of Papua New Guinea
- Awards: Officer of the Order of the British Empire; PNG Independence Medal; Edward Warner Award

Keith Noel Everal ("Bill") Bradfield OBE, FIEAust (25 December 1910 – 12 June 2006), also known as K. N. E. Bradfield, was an Australian civil and aviation engineer, public servant and diplomat, who served two terms as Australia's Permanent Representative to the International Civil Aviation Organization. Bradfield is one of four Australian recipients of the ICAO Edward Warner Award, civil aviation's highest honour (alongside Don Anderson, Brian O'Keeffe and David Warren).

== Early life and education ==
Keith Noel Everal Bradfield was born 25 December 1910 in Gordon, Sydney, New South Wales, Australia, the youngest child of civil engineer and creator of the Sydney Harbour Bridge and Story Bridge, John Bradfield, and Edith Jenkins. Bradfield was educated at Gordon Public School, and the Sydney Church of England Grammar School from 1922 to 1928, where he was a prefect. On leaving school he was admitted to the University of Sydney in 1929, graduated with a Bachelor of Science in 1932 and Bachelor of Engineering with First Class Honours in 1934. During this time Bradfield resided in St Paul's College (1930–1933). After finishing his studies he went to Brisbane to assist his father's work on the Story Bridge.

In November 1934, at age 24 Bradfield was selected as the Rhodes Scholar for New South Wales, and began doctoral studies in Engineering Science at New College, Oxford. Under the supervision of Professor R.V. Southwell, he completed his doctoral thesis in 1938 on methods of stress analysis in mathematically indeterminate frameworks, such as occur in aircraft structures.

Whilst at Oxford, Bradfield joined the Oxford University Air Squadron, gaining his pilot certification flying the Avro Tutor and the Hawker Hart. Originally intending to complete a final year of study at University of California, Berkeley (which conducted the world's only course in airport design), with the continuing tensions leading up to the Second World War the Rhodes trustees asked him to remain in England and Bradfield spent the remaining time of his scholarship working for the airport design firm Norman and Dawbarn.

== Public service ==
Returning to Australia in 1939, Bradfield found that preparations for war included much work for expanding and designing various aerodromes and airports. First working for the Queensland Main Roads Department and later with the Commonwealth Department of Civil Aviation, Bradfield's first assignments were to design aerodromes at Bowen, Mackay, Rockhampton and Bundaberg. Promoted to Superintendent of Ground Operations in 1941, he held that position until the department was re-organised in 1945, upon which he was appointed Chief Airport Engineer. In this role, Bradfield created designs for a significant expansion of Sydney Airport, with his plans approved by Prime Minister Ben Chifley in March 1946.

In 1947 Bradfield was appointed as Australia's permanent representative on the council of the International Civil Aviation Organization (ICAO) in Montreal, Quebec, Canada. While there, Bradfield was involved in discussions on the limitations of runway lengths and meetings of the organisation's aerodromes, air routes and ground aids committee, which worked on determining international aerodrome standards. Bradfield was elected vice-president of the council in 1949–50 and also served on the Air Navigation Commission, the technical agency of ICAO that works towards the uniformity of Air regulations and standards, from 1949 to 1952.

Returning to Australia in 1952, Bradfield was appointed director of airports for the Department of Civil Aviation and was responsible for designing expansions of Essendon Airport in Melbourne as the second international airport in Australia. In 1957 he was promoted to assistant director-general (ground facilities), and in 1964 became first assistant director-general (ground facilities). Faced with the growing challenges to airport infrastructure posed by the growth of the number and size of passenger jets entering service, requiring redesigns of runways and taxiways, and larger terminals. Bradfield was instrumental in the plans and designs for a new international airport for Melbourne at Tullamarine, which were formally unveiled in August 1965.

However, these plans, costed at £9.3 million, underwent significant criticism from certain representatives in NSW who alleged that Bradfield's plans gave Melbourne an unfair advantage over Sydney as the premier international air terminal in Australia. NSW Labor MP for Shortland, Charles Griffiths, in particular questioned Bradfield on this in a sitting of the Parliamentary Works Committee, "I think you will admit that you will give Tullamarine a distinct edge, in that for five or seven years this sort of thing will have to occur." This was an accusation Bradfield firmly denied. Although heavily involved in the Tullamarine project, Bradfield also started planning for a new international terminal for Sydney to replace the greatly outmoded Mascot terminal that had been built prior to the growth of jet aircraft passenger travel.

On leaving his role as Assistant Director-General in 1968, Bradfield gave a speech before the Melbourne Branch of the Royal Aeronautical Society, noting his thoughts on his guiding principles behind airport design: "It is sometimes not realised that an airport is a place of transit, and an airport terminal building is a place where a traveller wants to spend a minimum, not a maximum, of time. The efficiency of an airport terminal is best measured by the time it takes the traveller to pass through it in comfort."

== Later career and legacy ==
Bradfield returned to ICAO for another term as the Australian representative on the council from 1968 to 1972 and was involved in formulating ICAO provisions on aircraft noise and planning for the introduction of new types of aircraft such as the Boeing 747 and Concorde. In addition to his work with ICAO, he also served as a member and chairman of the South Pacific Air Transport Council and in 1960 was a member of the West Indies Civil Aviation Commission, established to advise the West Indies Government. On his return from Montreal in 1972, Bradfield retired from the Department of Civil Aviation. During his service to the Commonwealth, Bradfield was awarded the Award of Merit of the Commonwealth Professional Officers' Association (1963) and the Medal of Civil Aviation Council of Arab States (1971). In the 1966 New Year Honours he was made an Officer of the Order of the British Empire (OBE).

From 1973 to 1976 he was the civil aviation advisor to the Australian Territory of Papua and New Guinea and the Independent Government of Papua New Guinea from 1975, serving as the PNG controller of civil aviation and a founding member of the National Airlines Commission and Air Niugini. For his service in PNG he was awarded the Papua New Guinea Independence Medal in 1976. In 1991, Bradfield became the twenty-fifth recipient of the ICAO Edward Warner Award, the highest award in civil aviation, "for his eminent contribution to the development and provision of the technical and operational requirements of the ground‑based infrastructure of international civil aviation." In 1993 he was made a Fellow of the Institution of Engineers Australia (FIEAust). Returning to Sydney, Bradfield lived in retirement until he died aged 95 on 12 June 2006, survived by his wife Jeannette, two sons, four grandchildren and three great-grandchildren.

Diplomatic posts
Preceded by A. R. McComb	Permanent Representative of Australia to ICAO; 1947–1952	Succeeded by Jim Stone
Preceded by Jim Stone	Permanent Representative of Australia to ICAO; 1968–1972	Succeeded by Byron Lewis
Awards
Preceded by Igor Ivanovich Sikorsky	Recipient of the Edward Warner Award; 1991	Succeeded by Edward R.K. Dwemoh
