= Transaero =

Airline based in Russia

Transaero Трансаэро

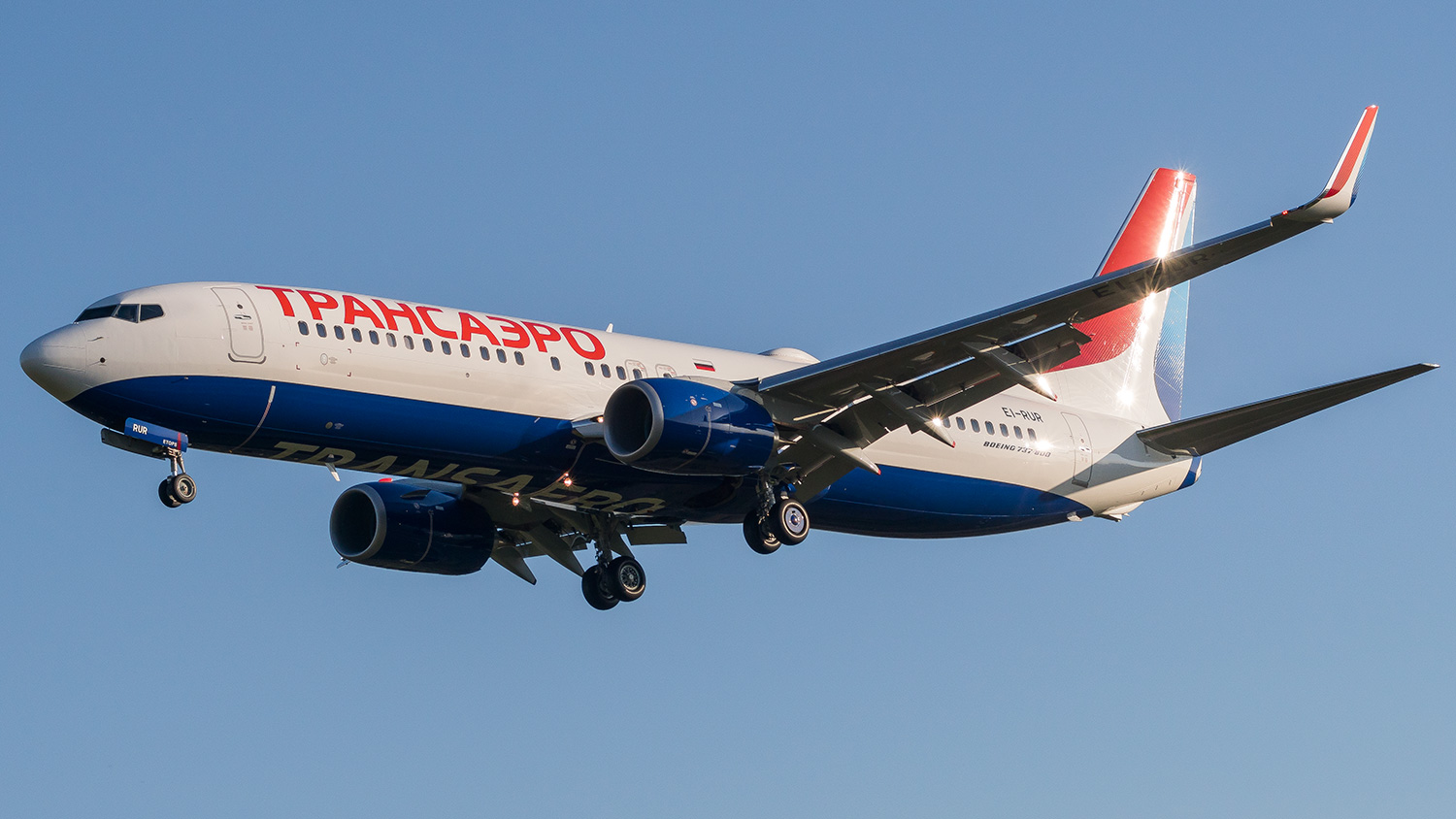
- A Transaero Boeing 737-800
IATA	ICAO	Call sign
UN	TSO	TRANSOVIET
- Founded: 28 December 1990
- Commenced operations: 5 November 1991
- Ceased operations: 25 October 2015
- Hubs: Moscow-Vnukovo; Saint Petersburg
- Secondary hubs: Sochi; Yekaterinburg
- Frequent-flyer program: Transaero Privilege Program
- Fleet size: 97
- Destinations: 156
- Parent company: Atlantic aviation
- Headquarters: Saint Petersburg, Russia
- Key people: Olga Pleshakova, CEO
- Website: transaero.ru

Transaero (Russian: Трансаэро), officially OJSC Transaero Airlines (Russian: ОАО «АК „ТРАНСАЭРО“», Открытое акционерное общество «Авиационная компания „ТРАНСАЭРО“») was a Russian airline that operated scheduled and charter flights to over 150 domestic and international destinations. Transaero's main hubs were Moscow Vnukovo Airport and Saint Petersburg Airport, with further bases throughout Russia. For much of its history, the head office was at Domodedovo International Airport, and towards the end, its head office was in Saint Petersburg.

Transaero filed for bankruptcy on 1 October 2015, and announced that it would cease all operations by 15 December the same year. However, Russian authorities revoked its operating license on 25 October.

In September 2021, the Moscow Commercial Court extended Transaero's business failure until March 2022 following a motion by the airline's bankruptcy supervisor Alexey Belokopyt.

== History ==
=== Early years ===
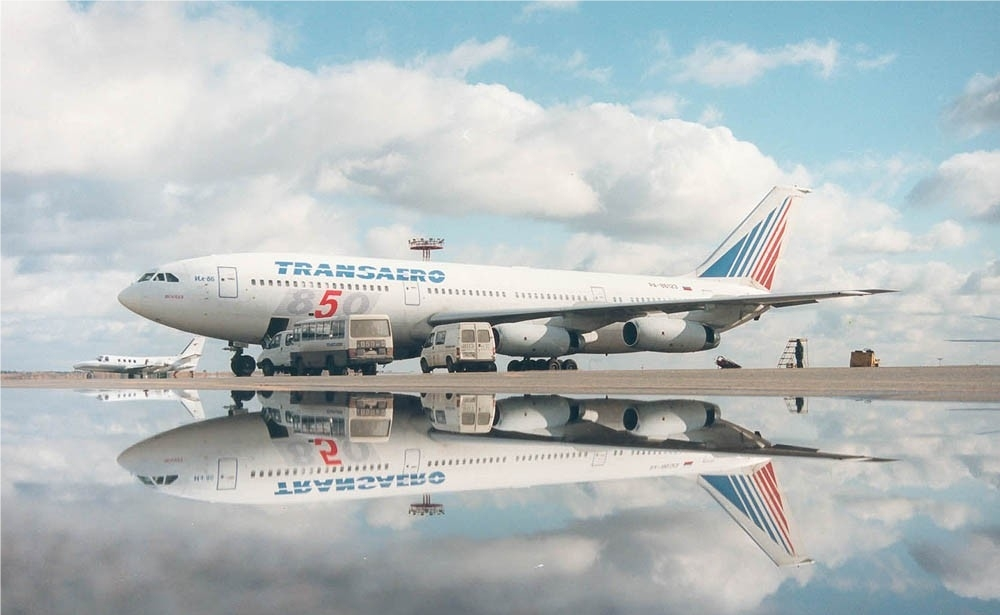
Transaero Ilyushin Il-86

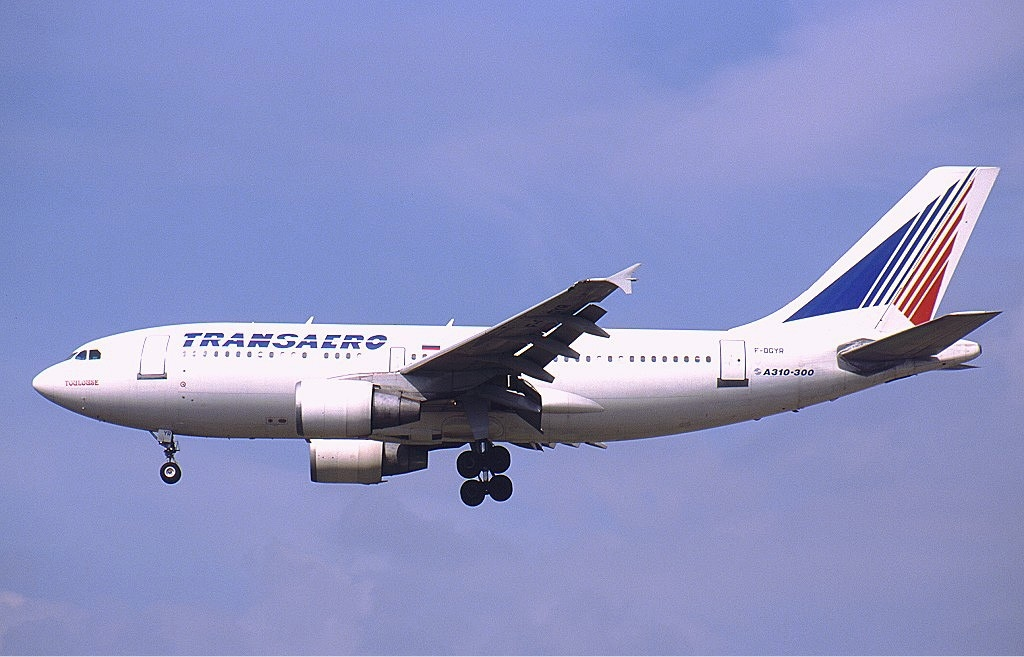
Transaero Airbus A310-300

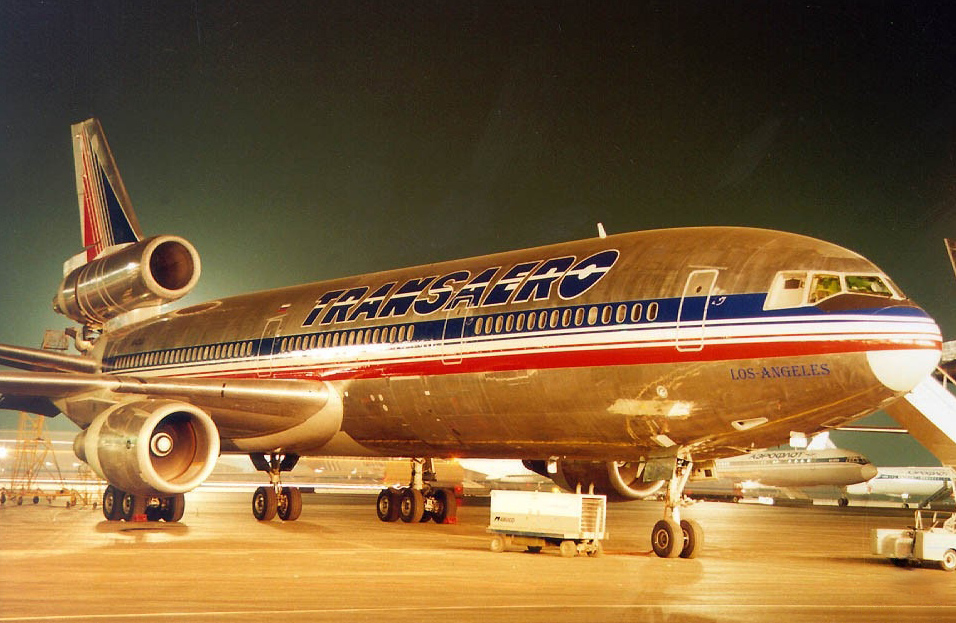
Transaero McDonnell Douglas DC-10 in the mid 1990s. This example formerly flew for American Airlines and still wore American's former bare-metal livery.

Transaero began as a charter airline with aircraft leased from Aeroflot. It was incorporated as a joint-stock company on 28 December 1990 and was the first private company approved for scheduled passenger services in the Soviet Union. Its first charter service was Moscow to Tel Aviv on 5 November 1991. In July 1992, Transaero received its own Ilyushin Il-86. It became the first privately owned airline to operate scheduled flights in Russia when it launched its Moscow–Alykel Airport, Norilsk flight in January 1993, followed by Kyiv, Sochi and Almaty later the same year. Its first international scheduled route outside the former Soviet Union was from Moscow to Tel Aviv in November 1993.

In April 1993, Transaero started operating Western-made aircraft when it received its first Boeing 737-200, followed by its first Boeing 757-200 in April 1994.

Transaero was also the first Russian airline with a frequent flyer program, which it established in 1995. It was also the first Russian airline with a Federal Aviation Administration aircraft maintenance certificate, which it obtained in 1997. In December 1998 a weekly service between Moscow and London Gatwick commenced. Transaero operated its first Boeing 737-700 in 1998, followed by Boeing 767-200 and Boeing 737-300 in 2002 and Boeing 767-300 and Boeing 737-400 in 2003. An agreement was signed to purchase 10 Tupolev Tu-214-300 aircraft in the same year. In 2005, Transaero became the first Russian passenger airline to operate the Boeing 747 when it started services on 11 July 2005 with a leased, ex-Virgin Atlantic Boeing 747-200 on scheduled services from Moscow to Tel Aviv. The aircraft would also operate summer charter flights to holiday destinations.

In May 2005, Transaero added a flight between Moscow and Montreal, marking the first time the airline flew to Canada. On 21 June 2006, Transaero also began operating nonstop flights between Moscow and Toronto. The service to Toronto was temporarily suspended in September 2008, but was later restored, whereas the service to Montreal was cancelled in 2009.

It was reported in 2007 that Transaero negotiated a deal with Continental Airlines to purchase 10 of the Boeing 737-500 aircraft still in Continental's fleet. In November 2007, the airline announced a new scheduled bi-weekly service between Moscow and Sydney, Australia via Hong Kong, using Boeing 767-300 aircraft; commencing 24 December 2007, although the route was later terminated. Transaero also started to replace all of its Boeing 747-200s with used Boeing 747-400s at the end of 2007.

=== Late 2000s and early 2010s ===
Austrian Airlines and Transaero Airlines began code-sharing on Vienna-Moscow flights in October 2009.

In April 2010, Transaero arranged to lease 9 ex-Japan Airlines Boeing 747-400s which entered the fleet in 2010–2012. In December 2010, Transaero announced that they would increase their deal to 12 Boeing 747-400s. In October 2010, Transaero launched flights to Beijing, Miami and New York City. This marked the return of Transaero to the United States since cancelling service to Los Angeles. Beijing became the second Chinese destination after Sanya.

In 2011, Transaero received four Boeing 777-300 aircraft previously owned by Singapore Airlines. Also in 2011, Transaero agreed to buy four of Boeing's newest widebody, the Boeing 747-8, and put in a memorandum of understanding for 4 Airbus A380s. Transaero also ordered 4 Boeing 787 Dreamliner aircraft on 26 December 2011, confirming this order on 8 April 2012.

On 29 April 2012, Transaero resumed flights between Moscow and Los Angeles, utilizing a 777-200ER. In 2013, Transaero carried nearly 12.5 million people and operated 98 aircraft. In 2014, Transaero began direct flights from Moscow to Miami with Boeing 747-400s.

Transaero hosted a competition for a new logo and livery for rebranding in 2013–2014, but did not discuss the procedure's timetable. In April 2015, the airline decided to rebrand during 2015 and to introduce the new livery and logo with upcoming Airbus A380, Boeing 747-8, and Sukhoi Superjet 100 aircraft.

=== Final years and demise ===
By March 2015, Transaero had accumulated around 1.1 billion euros (approximately 77 billion rubles) of debt.

In May 2015, Transaero announced the expected receipt of its first two Airbus A380-800s and one Boeing 747-8 later in the year. The A380s were intended to operate from Moscow to New York and Vladivostok. However, this was quickly followed by a report that Transaero asked Airbus to reschedule the delivery of the first A380 beyond 2015 due to financial difficulties. At the IATA Annual General Meeting and World Air Transport Summit in June 2015, the president of Airbus, Fabrice Brégier said "I’m sure we will meet the target to deliver the A380s to Transaero. The problem is that they are facing a difficult economic situation because of the rouble’s devaluation and a shrinking market for tourism from Russia."

Transaero announced the transfer of all operations at Moscow-Domodedovo to their other main hub at Moscow-Vnukovo to unify Moscow operations by 25 October 2015. This would not happen because of Transaero's closure.

In September 2015, Aeroflot agreed to acquire 75% of the highly indebted Transaero Airlines for the symbolic price of one rouble. However, by 2 October 2015, Aeroflot dropped the offer, stating that no agreement with Transaero and its shareholders had been reached by the deadline. The same day, with the debt having swollen to 3.9 billion euros (260 billion rubles) Transaero announced it intended to end all operations on 15 December 2015 as it faced imminent bankruptcy. Soon afterwards, Aeroflot announced the takeover of 34 of Transaero's leased aircraft, of which 20 are long-haul models. Subsequent to this announcement, Transaero ceased all ticket sales and refunded travel booked for after the shutdown date, and began to drastically reduce its schedule, cancelling or suspending flights on a daily basis and operating only a provisional schedule.

On 20 October 2015, competitor S7 Airlines announced an interest to buy a 50 percent stake in the bankrupt airline. After this sale fell through, on 24 October 2015, Russian authorities announced that Transaero's air operating certificate would be revoked within 48 hours (as the summer schedule concluded) and began to allocate Transaero's former traffic rights to other airlines, stating that Transaero's enormous debt meant that its continued operation would pose an imminent hazard to the flying public.

Prior to the shutdown, Transaero began to ferry its remaining fleet to Teruel in Spain. Among those are six of its nine long-range Boeing 747s and almost half its fleet of medium-range Boeing 737s. The final Transaero flight, Flight 160, flown by a Boeing 767-200ER, operated from Sokol Airport near Magadan in eastern Russia to Moscow-Vnukovo, landing on 25 October 2015 at 11:54 UTC.

In 2017 the United States Air Force entered into a contract with Boeing to purchase two undelivered Boeing 747-8s ordered by Transaero. The pair of planes have registration numbers N894BA and N895BA. The Air Force and Secret Service will retrofit these new aircraft with telecommunications and security equipment to bring them to the required security level of the presidential aircraft.

== Safety ==
In its 25-year history, Transaero never had an accident resulting in loss of life or a hull loss. In 2014, JACDEC ranked Transaero as the 17th safest airline in the world and the safest airline in Russia.

== Corporate affairs ==
Its head office was in Saint Petersburg.

As of 2009, its head office was on the property of Domodedovo International Airport in Domodedovo, Moscow Oblast.

=== Management ===
Transaero was owned primarily by Aleksandr Pleshakov and his wife Olga Pleshakova, who was the CEO of the airline for most of its existence. Aleksandr's mother Tatiana Anodina has been the head of the Interstate Aviation Committee, the aviation oversight body in CIS, since 1991. Aleksandr's father is Piotr Pleshakov - a Soviet military engineer, who was the Soviet Union's Minister of Radioelectronic Industry from 1974 until 1987. There was press speculation regarding Anodina's conflict of interest in certifying aircraft with respect to Transaero's market position. Alexey Vasilyevich Belokopyt was appointed head of the company starting in October 2017.

=== Maintenance operations ===
Transaero established a maintenance company, Transaero Engineering Ireland, based at Shannon Airport, Ireland as a result of its purchase of the Air Atlanta aircraft maintenance operation. In addition to maintaining its own aircraft, Transaero Engineering also performed third-party maintenance work for other customers, including airlines Air Berlin, Arkia Israel Airlines, El Al, and the TUI Group family of airlines, and aircraft lessors AerCap, Aircastle, BBAM LLC, FLY Leasing, GECAS, ILFC, Macquarie AirFinance, and SMBC.

On 5 January 2015, the company entered examinership after the airline failed to pay its maintenance bill (approx €2.4m) for the year 2014.

The company, Transaero Engineering Ireland, was renamed Atlantic Aviation Group after Patrick Jordan, the former COO of Siteserv acquired the business out of examinership in a transaction reportedly valued at €2.5 million.

== Destinations ==
=== Codeshare agreements ===
Prior to the closure of the airline, Transaero maintained codeshare agreements with the following airlines:

- Aer Lingus
- Aigle Azur
- airBaltic
- Austrian Airlines
- Belavia
- China Airlines
- easyJet
- Singapore Airlines
- UTair Aviation
- Virgin Atlantic

== Fleet ==
=== Fleet before shutdown ===
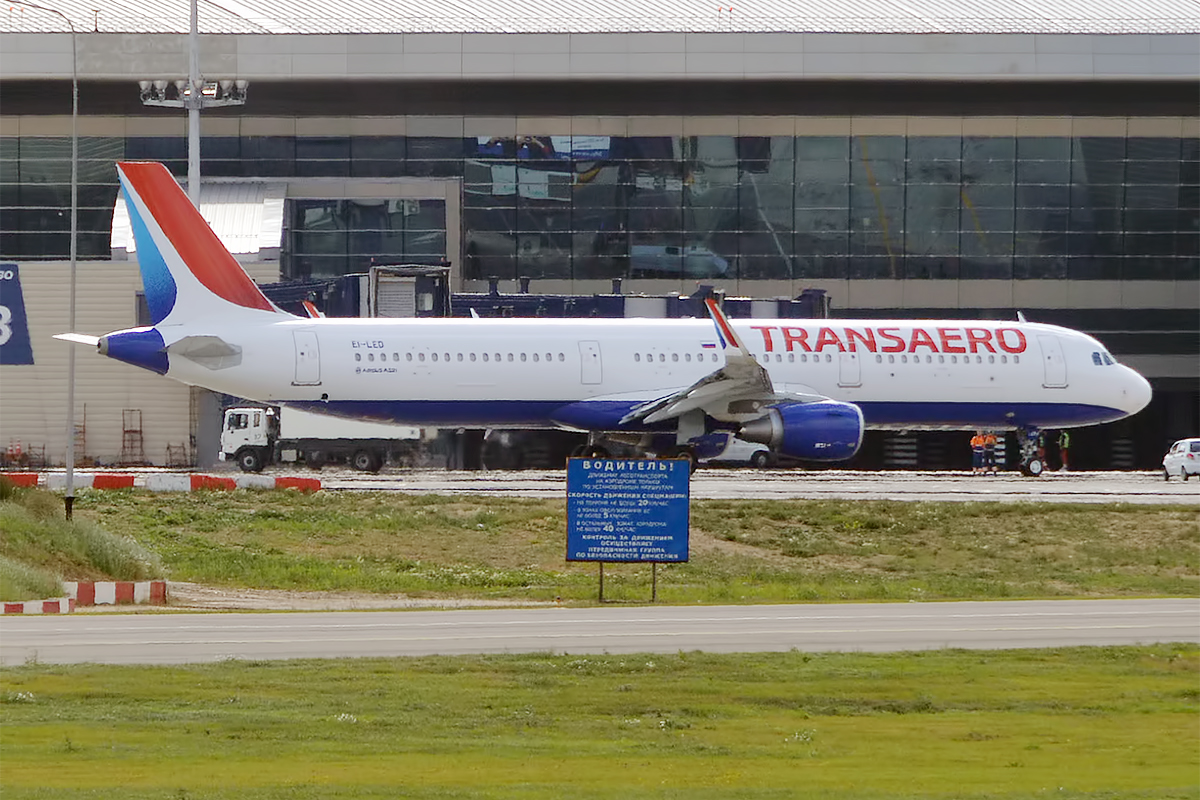
Transaero Airbus A321 at Vnukovo International Airport

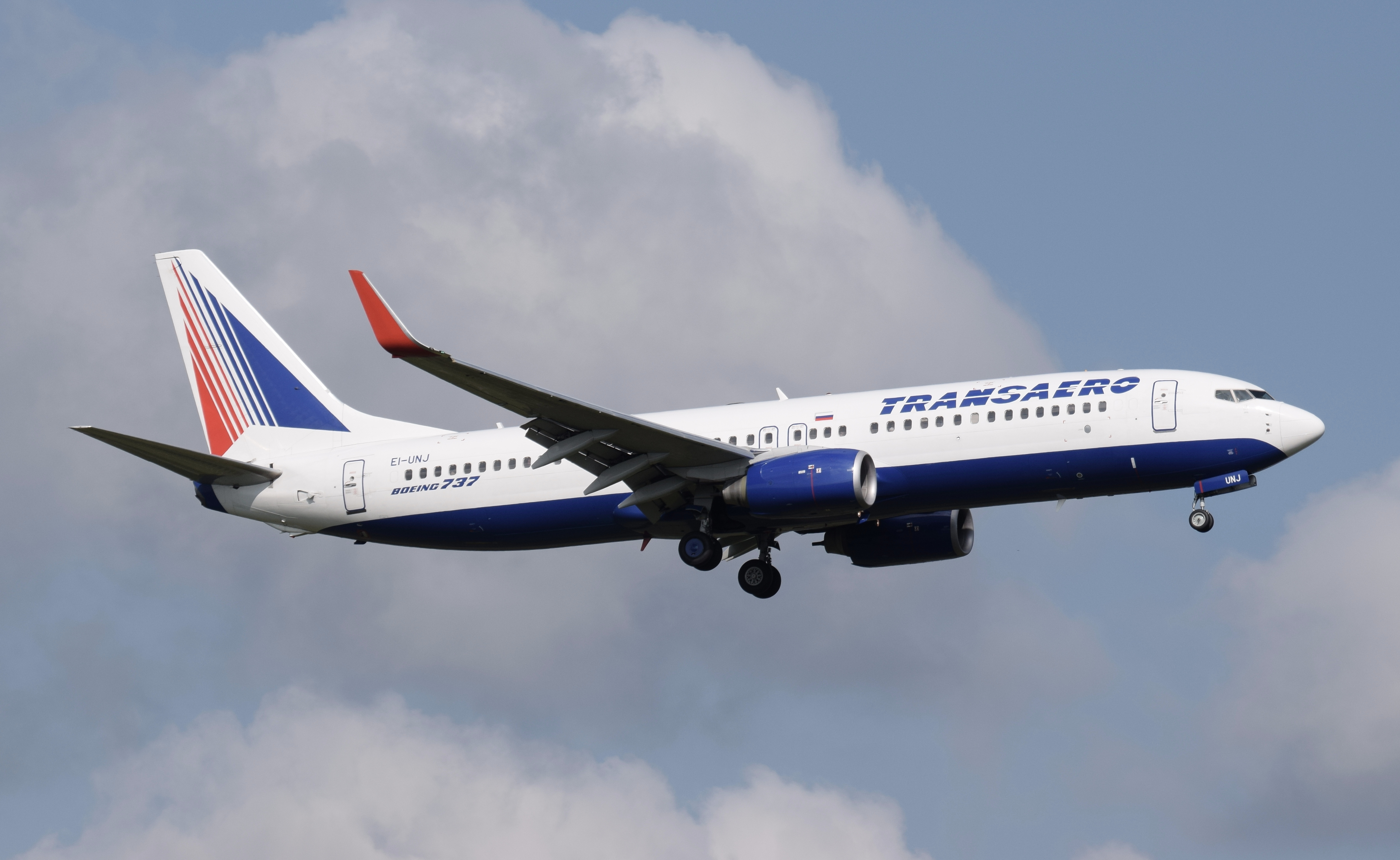
Transaero Boeing 737-800

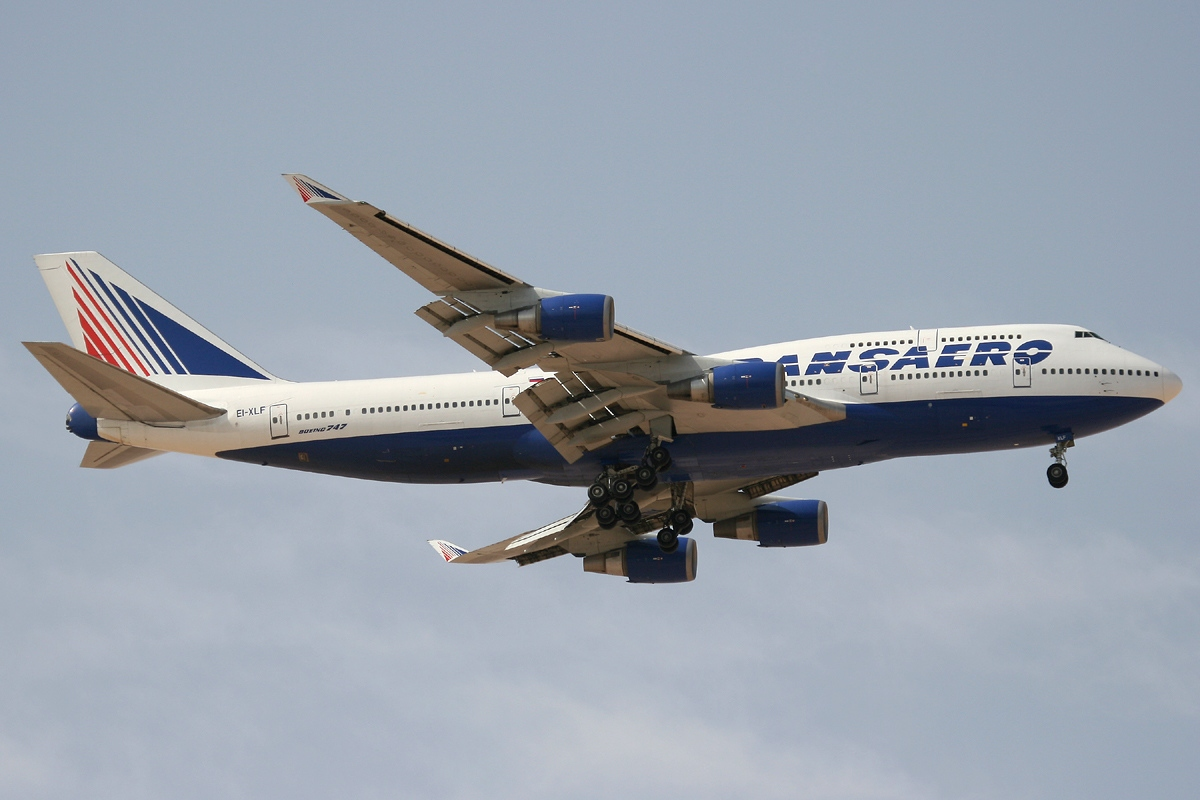
Transaero Boeing 747-400

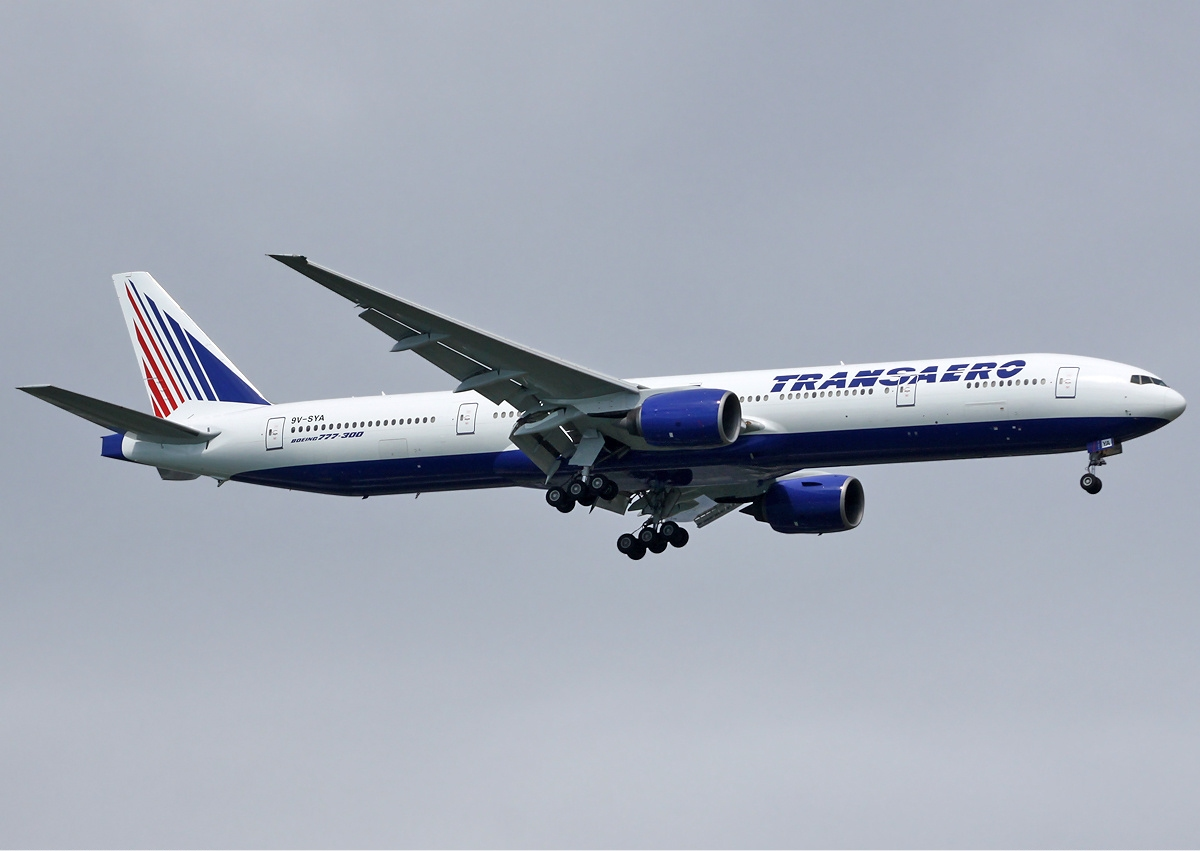
Transaero Boeing 777-300

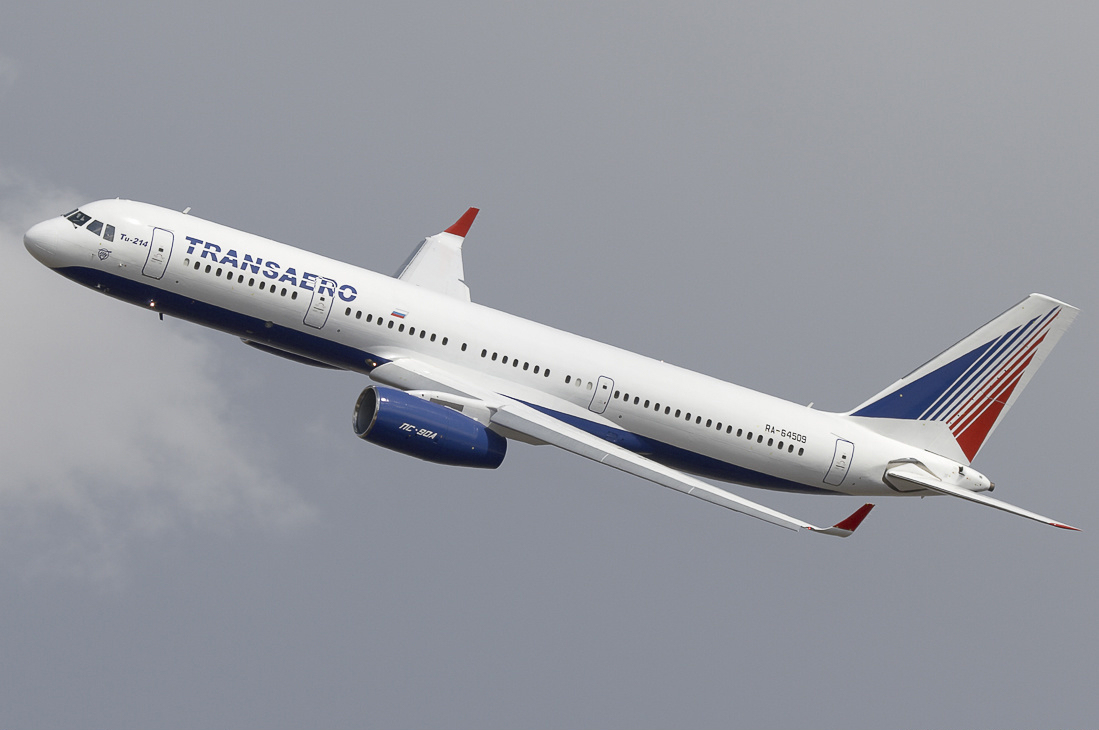
Transaero Tupolev Tu-214

Just prior to Transaero's shutdown in 2015, its fleet consisted of the following aircraft and planned orders:

Transaero Airlines fleet
Aircraft type	In Service	Orders	Passengers					Notes
Aircraft type	In Service	Orders	F	J	W	Y	Total	Notes
Airbus A320neo	—	8	TBA					Originally planned to replace Boeing 737 Classic.
Airbus A321-200	—	6	TBA					Two intended for delivery were parked by the lessor due to bankruptcy.
Airbus A330-300	—	8	TBA					
Airbus A330-900	—	12	TBA					
Airbus A380-800	—	4	12	24	—	616	652	Deliveries were planned from 2016.
Boeing 737-300	2	—	—	8	42	72	122	Was planned to be replaced by Airbus A320neo.
Boeing 737-400	4	—	—	8	60	72	140	Was planned to be replaced by Airbus A320neo.
Boeing 737-500	10	—	—	8	42	51	101	3 equipped with winglets.
Boeing 737-800	12	10	—	8	60	96	164	12 equipped with winglets. New livery introduced on EI-RUR.
Boeing 747-400	9	—	9	26	—	409	447	Were planned to be replaced by Airbus A380-800s and Boeing 747-8Is.
Boeing 747-400	9	—	10	12	—	439	461	Were planned to be replaced by Airbus A380-800s and Boeing 747-8Is.
Boeing 747-400	9	—	—	12	—	510	522	Were planned to be replaced by Airbus A380-800s and Boeing 747-8Is.
Boeing 747-8I	—	4	8	32	—	424	464	Planned to replace the Boeing 747-400. Two ordered and fully built planes were stored in a California boneyard and subsequently sold to the U.S. Air Force. These planes will be converted to VC-25B for use as United States Presidential transport.
Boeing 767-200ER	2	—	—	16	—	214	230	
Boeing 767-300ER	8	—	—	8	117	106	235	
Boeing 767-300ER	8	—	—	26	98	92	216	
Boeing 777-200	2	—	12	14	167	113	306	
Boeing 777-200ER	6	—	12	14	167	113	306	
Boeing 777-300	4	—	4	14	131	222	371	
Sukhoi Superjet 100	—	6	TBA					
Tupolev Tu-204	3	—	—	8	—	174	182	
Irkut MS-21-300	—	6	TBA					
Total	62	64						

== Cabin ==
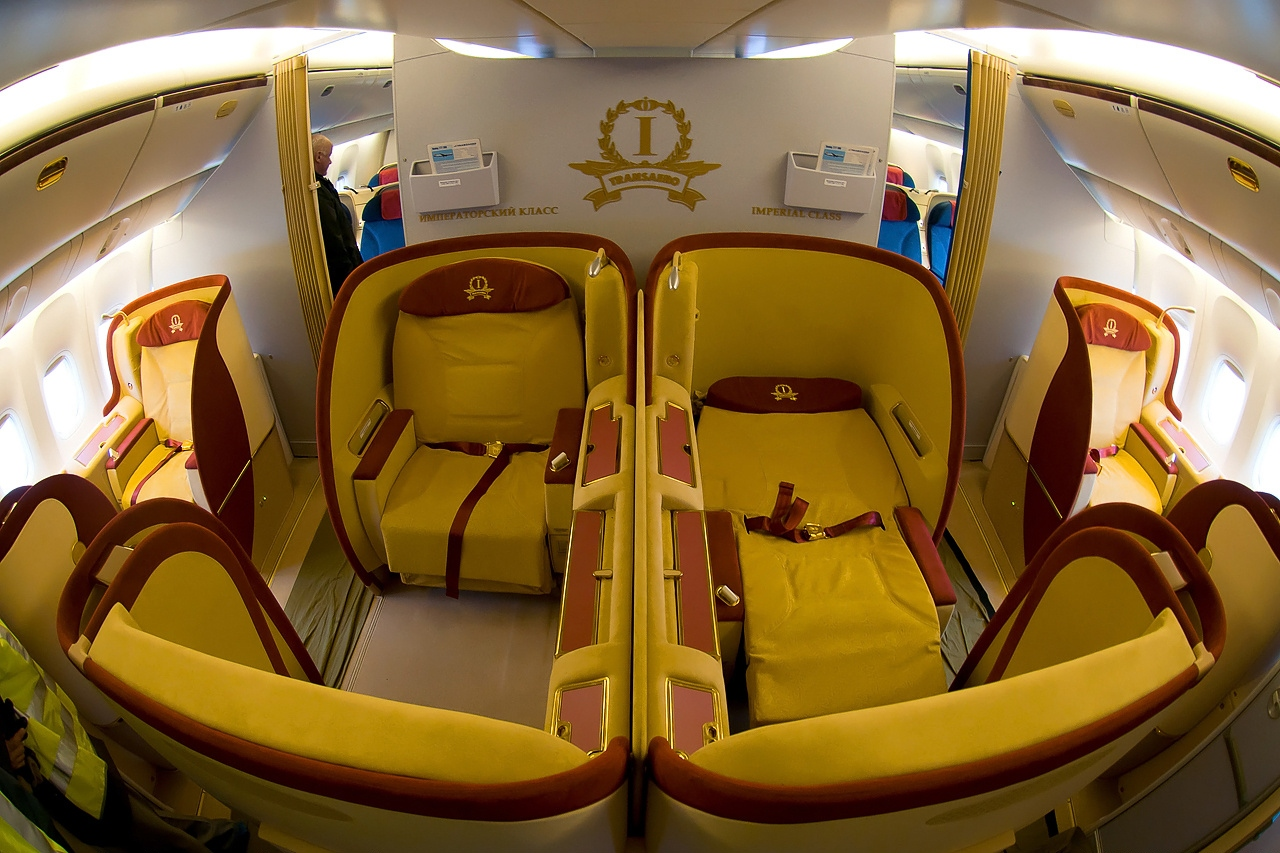
Imperial Class on board a Transaero Boeing 777-300

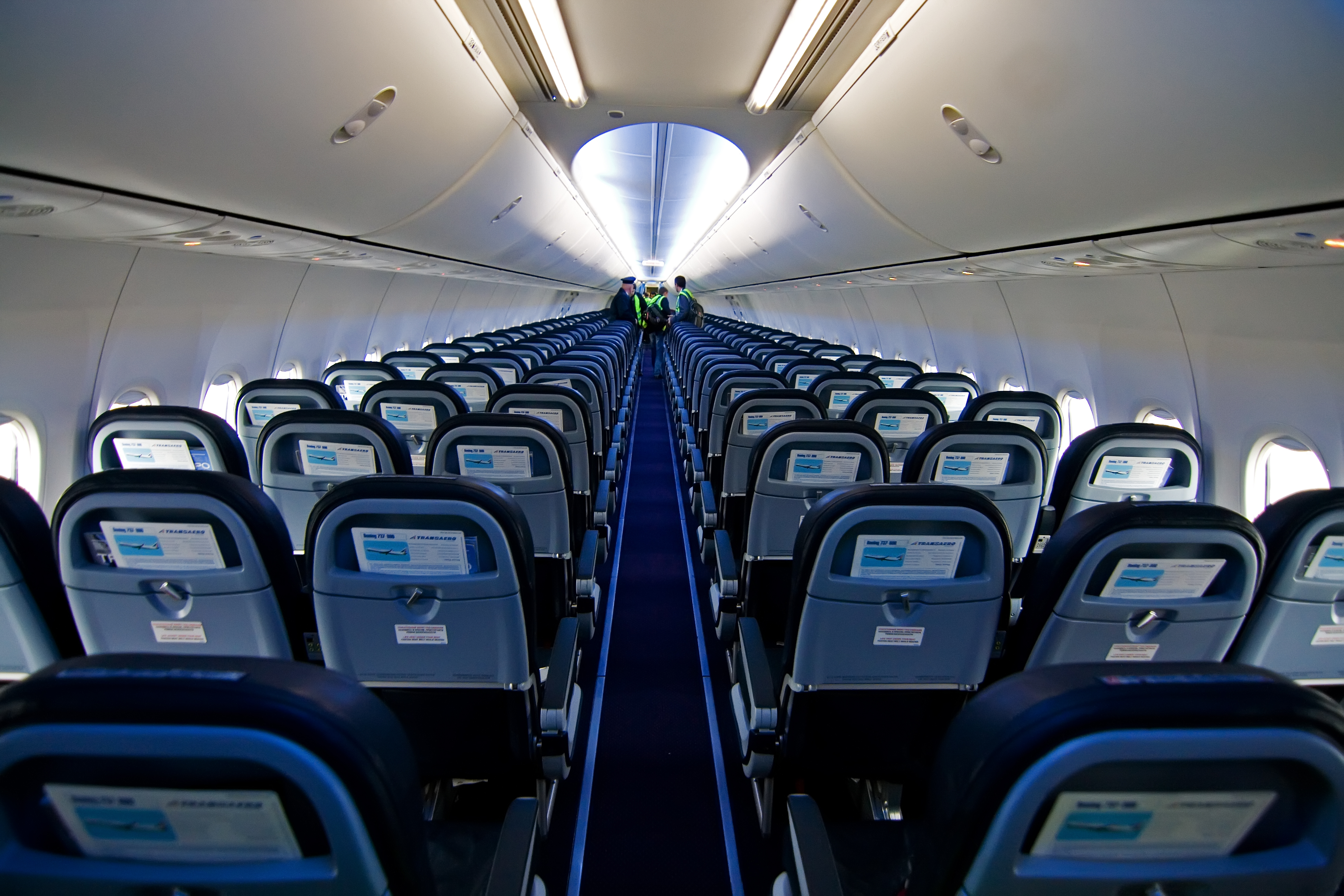
Tourist Economy Class on board a Transaero Boeing 737-800

Transaero's cabins differed greatly in amenities and layout from plane to plane, depending on which airline the aircraft was bought or leased from, ranging from poorly equipped cabins of older European/USA operators on 737s to better features in aircraft leased or purchased from Singapore Airlines (Transaero had to install their own first class cabin, because SIA kept their first class seats). The description below applied only to the Boeing 777s which used to belong to Singapore Airlines. 777-300s and some 747-400 were retrofitted with the Fiber optics to the screen Lumexis AVOD system in all classes. Wi-Fi Internet connection and cellular services are available on select routes and planes, with the price tag varying from 400 RUR ($12 US) for an hour to 800 RUR ($24 US) for 24 hours.

Tourist Economy Class

Transaero's Tourist Economy Class featured standard seat pitch (depends on aircraft but usually 31-32 inches), recline and width. The airline provides free food for Tourist passengers and an in-flight entertainment system is available for free on Boeing 747-400, Boeing 777-200ER and Boeing 777-300. The in-flight entertainment on international routes aboard the 747, and the 777-200ER, was either an integrated personal TV with 5-7 broadcast channels or AVOD Lumexis.

Premium Economy Class

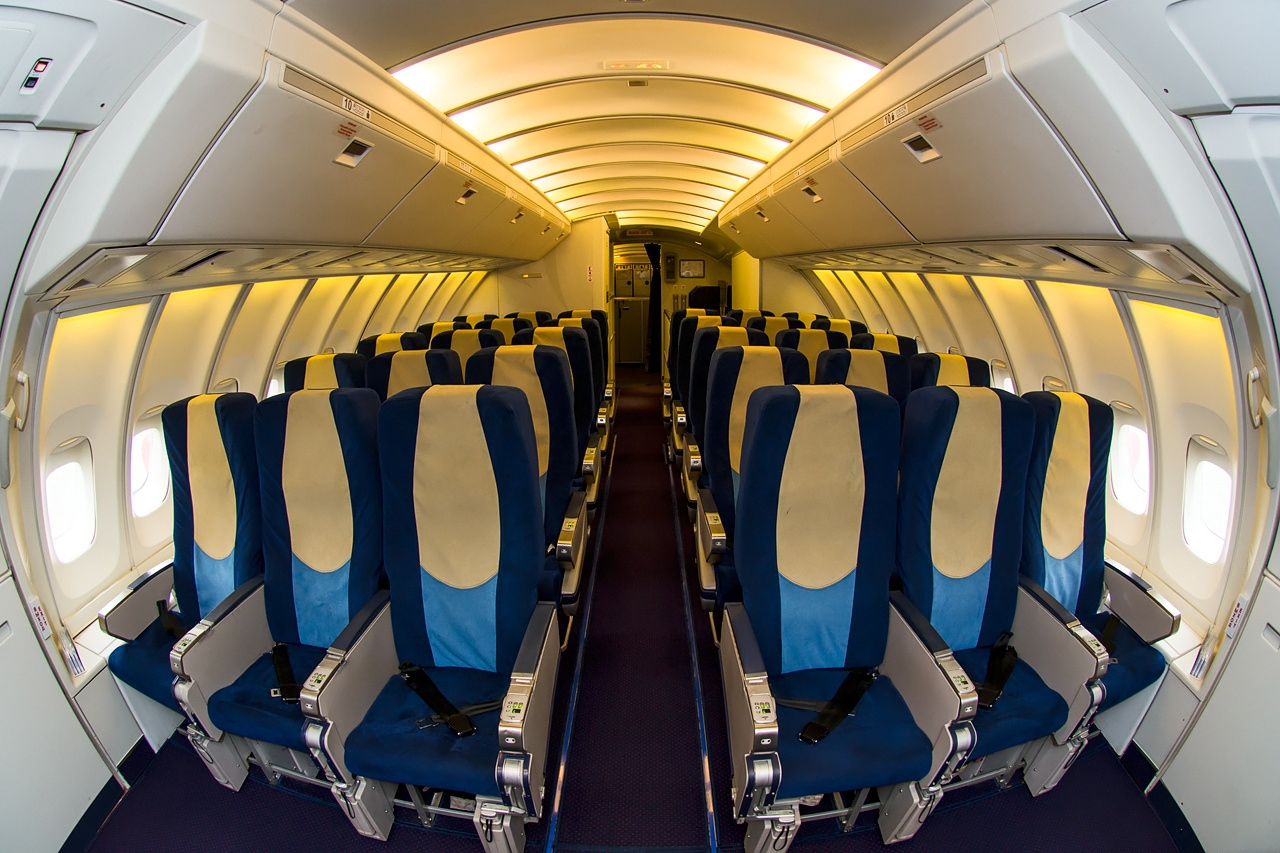
Tourist Economy Class on the top deck of a Transaero Boeing 747-400

Transaero's Premium Economy Class offered the same seat width as the Tourist Economy Class but a greater seat pitch of up to 36 inches and enhanced recline features for a recline of 29 degrees (just over 7 inches). The Premium Economy Class seats on the 777-300 were also distinguished by red seats instead of the blue seats in Tourist Economy Class. In addition to more seat pitch, recline and free food, Transaero also offers a larger baggage allowance for the Premium Economy class fares. The in-flight-entertainment system was available for free, with Lumexis AVOD on select Boeing 747-400s and all Boeing 777-300s. Passengers flying Premium Economy were also able to make use of a dedicated check-in desk at selected airports.

Business Class

Transaero's Business Class offered passengers a wider seat than Economy along with additional legroom and deeper recline. Each seat had two armrests. In-Flight Entertainment was free of charge and included a larger selection of music, movies and television. The cabins were located either in the upper deck on 747s or in the front part of the plane on all other types. The menus offered more choices and better quality food than Economy. The inflight service was individual and a la carte with wide selection of free beverages, wells and wines. There were free taxi transfers from Moscow Airports on some international routes and some fare classes.

Imperial Class

The Imperial Class was Transaero's First Class. The seats offered extra privacy and were the widest seats of all on the aircraft. The seat reclined fully flat to form a large bed for passengers and the food was either Russian or European. Complimentary taxi transfers were available for Imperial Class passengers.
