= Turbulent Skies =

Dutch television series

- Genre: Drama
- Created by: Joram Lürsen
- Starring: Anthony Fokker; Albert Plesman
- Country of origin: Netherlands
- Original language: Dutch

Original release
- Network: AVROTROS
- Release: 18 October – 6 December 2020

Turbulent Skies (Dutch: Vliegende Hollanders) is a 2020 Dutch television series, directed by Joram Lürsen.

The series is about Anthony Fokker and Albert Plesman, two aviation pioneers who stood at the cradle of civil aviation in the Netherlands. The series is set between 1919, the year of the First Air Traffic Exhibition Amsterdam, co-organized by Plesman, and 1939, the year in which Fokker died. Because few aircraft from this period have been preserved, a lot of CGI was used in making the series.

The series first aired on AVROTROS on October 18, 2020. It is available on Amazon Prime Video as King of the Skies.

== Cast ==
Actor	Role
Bram Suijker	Anthony Fokker (youth)
Fedja van Huêt	Anthony Fokker
Steef de Bot	Albert Plesman (youth)
Daan Schuurmans	Albert Plesman
Xander van Vledder	Frits Fentener van Vlissingen (youth)
Victor Löw	Frits Fentener van Vlissingen
Aus Greidanus Sr.	Herman Fokker
Leny Breederveld	Anna Fokker
Sanne Samina Hanssen	Suze Plesman (youth)
Anniek Pheifer	Suze Plesman
Ward Kerremans	Iwan Smirnoff (youth)
Koen van der Molen	Koene Dirk Parmentier (youth)
Lykele Muus	Koene Dirk Parmentier
Frieda Barnhard	Neeltje Langenberg (youth)
Laura de Boer	Neeltje Langenberg
Zita Téby	Violet Austman
Hylke van Sprundel	Cornelis van Aalst
