= Interstate Aviation Committee =

Commonwealth of Independent States body

- Межгосударственный авиационный комитет
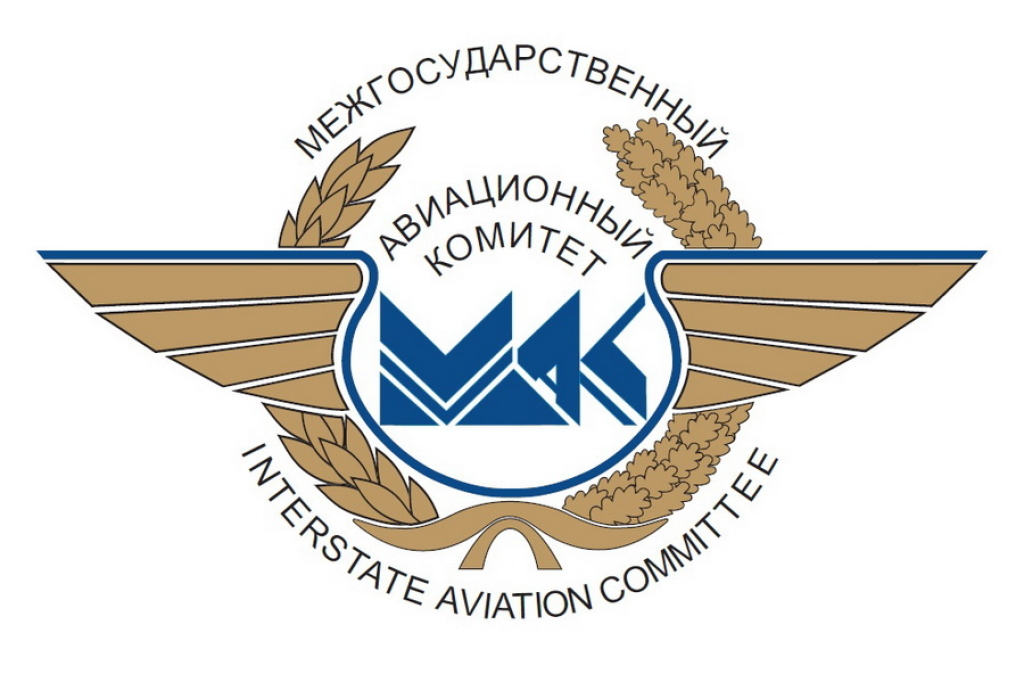

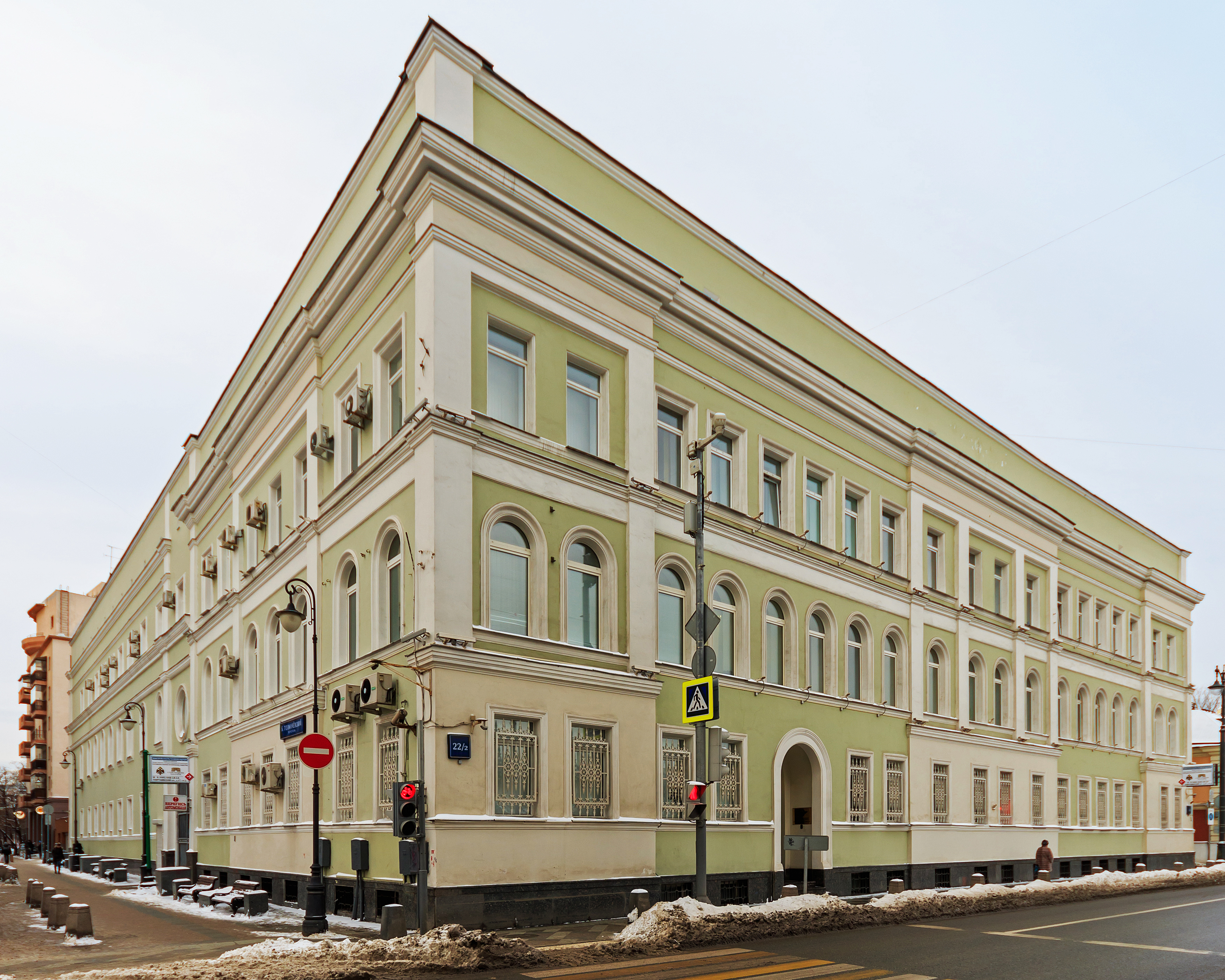
- IAC headquarters in Moscow

Agency overview
- Formed: 1991
- Preceding agency: Gosavianadzor of the USSR
- Jurisdiction: CIS countries
- Headquarters: Moscow, Russia
- Agency executive: Oleg Storchevoy, chairman
- Parent agency: Civil Aviation and Airspace Use Council of the Commonwealth of Independent States
- Website: mak-iac.org/en/

The Interstate Aviation Committee (IAC; Russian: Межгосударственный авиационный комитет, МАК) is an executive body of the Civil Aviation and Airspace Use Council of the Commonwealth of Independent States (CIS) and was formed in 1991 according to the Civil Aviation and Airspace Use Multilateral Agreement, signed on 25 December 1991.

== History ==
In the Soviet Union, the State Supervisory Commission for Flight Safety (Gosavianadzor), under the Council of Ministers, was the predecessor of the IAC. The Gosavianadzor conducted aircraft accident and incident investigations. until the IAC was established in Minsk on 25 December 1991.

The IAC has been accredited by ICAO as an intergovernmental organisation which may be invited to attend suitable ICAO meetings (officially, ICAO does not classify these as observers).

The Aviation Accident Investigation Commission of the IAC cooperates with the Federal Air Transport Agency in investigations of aviation accidents. One publicly known and controversial IAC investigation was the 2010 plane crash that killed Polish president Lech Kaczyński.

== Governance ==
The committee is headquartered in Yakimanka District, Central Administrative Okrug, Moscow, Russia. Since 1991, Tatiana Anodina had been the chairperson of the committee until January 2023. There was press speculation regarding Anodina's conflict of interest in certifying aircraft with respect to Transaero's market position.

== Participating states ==
=== Current ===
As of September 2024, the following countries are named by the IAC as the Treaty participants:

- Azerbaijan
- Armenia
- Belarus
- Kazakhstan
- Kyrgyzstan
- Russia (partially, in aviation accidents investigation domain)
- Tajikistan
- Turkmenistan
- Uzbekistan

=== Former ===
- Georgia
  - Despite the fact that Georgia withdrew from the Commonwealth of Independent States, as of 2011 Georgian authorities may still cooperate with the IAC.
- Moldova
  - In 1999 Government of Moldova announced its intention to reduce or end participation in the Civil Aviation and Airspace Use Multilateral Agreement.
- Ukraine
  - Ukraine has its own independent civil aviation and accidents investigation agencies. Ukraine's participation was based on two agreements concluded within the CIS - a presidential decree.

== See also ==
- Aviation accidents and incidents
