= Arnold W. G. Kean =

English lawyer

Arnold Wilfred Geoffrey Kean CBE (29 September 1914 – 18 January 2000) is an English lawyer most noted for his contribution to the development of civil aviation law.

== Biography ==
=== Early life ===
He was born in Salford, in Lancashire, England, on September 29, 1914. Educated at Blackpool Grammar School, Kean read law at Queens' College, Cambridge where he was President of the Union and took a double first. He then won a Commonwealth Fund Fellowship and continued his studies at Harvard Law School. He returned to England in 1938 and was called to the Bar with a certificate of honor in 1939.

=== War Years ===
Rejected for active service, he spent the war years as a lawyer for the British Purchasing Commission in New York and Washington, obtaining American supplies for the war effort.

=== The Treasury ===
Shortly after the War ended he returned to London and entered the Treasury Solicitor's Department, working first for the Ministry of Transport and eventually retiring as Legal Adviser and Secretary to the Civil Aviation Authority. He died in Harrow, England, on January 18, 2000.

== Career ==
His principal work, to which he devoted 40 years of his professional life, was the orderly development of civil aviation law. He played a significant role in the preparation of international conventions to combat hijacking and the criminal use of plastic explosives and was instrumental in the drafting of countless agreements to prevent offensive acts affecting aviation and to regulate the leasing and chartering of planes. He lectured in international law at University College London, (of which he was an Honorary Fellow) and abroad, educating an entire generation of specialists, and also to civil servants on the functions of the legal branch of the civil service at the Civil Service College, Sunningdale.

After retirement, Kean served as a member and President of the United Nations Administrative Tribunal and assisted a number of developing states in drafting their air laws. A witty and entertaining lecturer with interests in classical music, stamps, and gardening, he held many appointments, awards and offices throughout his career. He was awarded the CBE in 1977, the Edward Warner Award, the highest honor in civil aviation, and the King Christian X Liberation Medal for wartime services to Denmark.
