= State Supervisory Commission for Flight Safety =

- Государственная комиссия по надзору за безопасностью полётов воздушных судов при правительстве СССР

Agency overview
- Formed: 1986
- Dissolved: 1992
- Superseding agency: Interstate Aviation Committee (in Russia)
- Jurisdiction: Soviet Union
- Headquarters: Moscow, Russian SFSR
- Agency executive: Ivan Mashkivsky, chairperson
- Parent agency: Government of the Soviet Union

The State Supervisory Commission for Flight Safety (Russian: Государственная комиссия по надзору за безопасностью полётов воздушных судов при правительстве СССР, Gosavianadzor, Госавианадзор СССР) was an agency of the government of the Soviet Union, under the Council of Ministers. The agency investigated aviation accidents and incidents. After the breakup of the Soviet Union in 1991, the former Soviet republics that joined the Commonwealth of Independent States formed the Interstate Aviation Committee (IAC or MAK), the successor to the Gosavianadzor.
