= Anthony Fokker =

Dutch aviation pioneer (1890–1939)

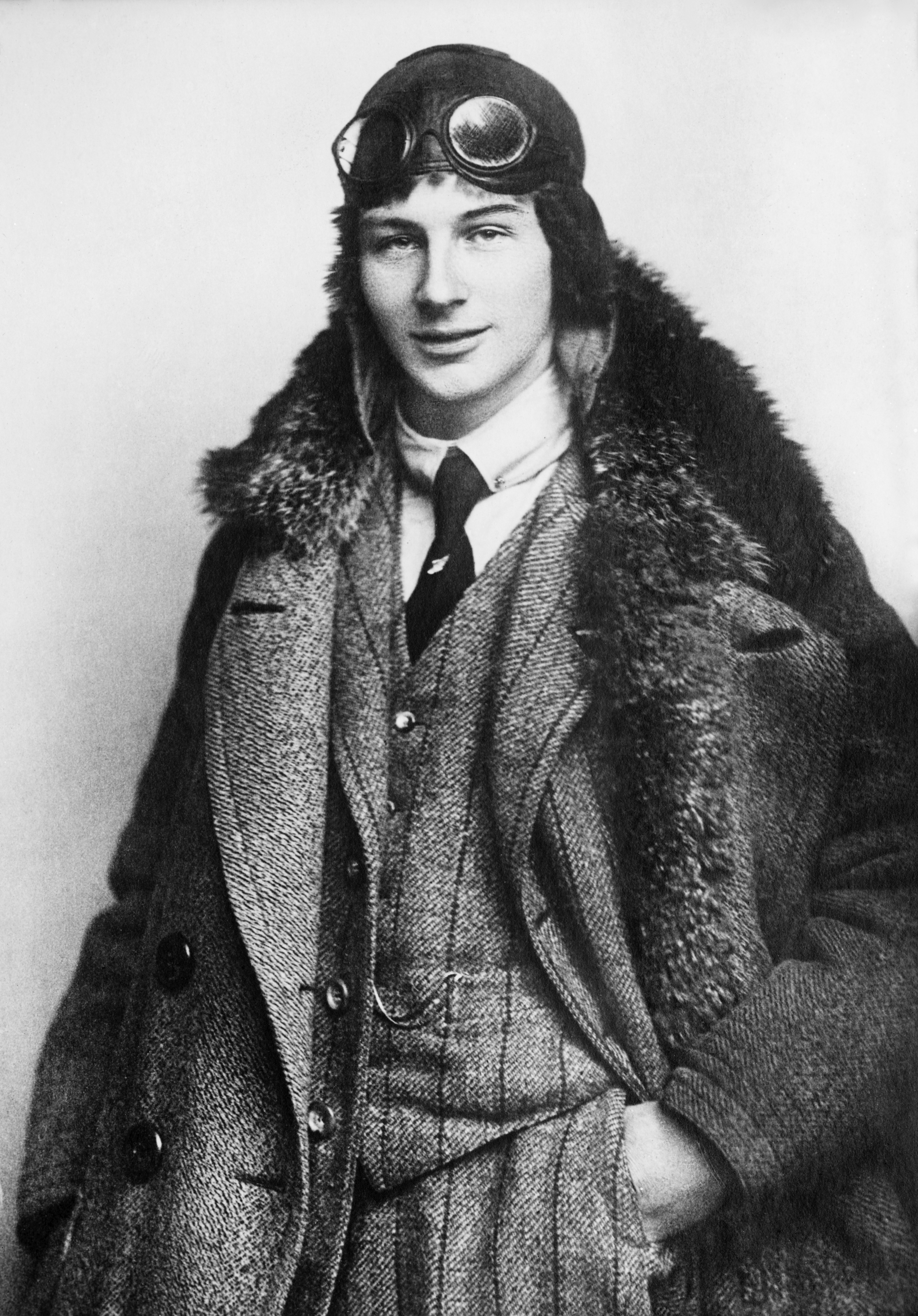
- Fokker in 1912
- Born: Anton Herman Gerard Fokker; 6 April 1890; Blitar, Oost-Java, Dutch East Indies (now Indonesia)
- Died: 23 December 1939 (aged 49); Murray Hill Hospital, New York City, US
- Occupation: Aircraft manufacturer
- Spouse(s): Sophie Marie Elisabeth von Morgen (1919–1923); Violet Austman (1927–1929) (her death)

Anton Herman Gerard "Anthony" Fokker (6 April 1890 – 23 December 1939) was a Dutch aviation pioneer, aviation entrepreneur, aircraft designer, and aircraft manufacturer. He produced fighter aircraft in Germany during the First World War such as the Eindecker monoplanes, the Dr.1 triplane and the D.VII biplane.

After the Treaty of Versailles forbade Germany to produce aircraft, Fokker moved his business to the Netherlands. There, his company was responsible for a variety of aircraft including the Fokker F.VII/3m trimotor, a successful interwar passenger aircraft. He died in New York City in 1939. Later authors suggest he was personally charismatic but unscrupulous in business and a controversial character.

== Early life ==
Anthony (Tony) Fokker was born in Blitar, Dutch East Indies (now Indonesia), to Herman Fokker, a Dutch coffee plantation owner and Johanna Hugona Wouterina Wilhelmina Diemont. Some sources say that he was born in Kediri. At that time, Blitar was a part of the "Kediri Residency", a colonial administrative division, the capital of which was Kediri. He was a cousin of the physicist Adriaan Fokker.

When Fokker was four, the family returned to the Netherlands and settled in Haarlem in order to provide Fokker and his older sister, Toos, with a Dutch upbringing.

Fokker was not a studious boy and did not complete his high school education. However, he showed an early interest in mechanics, and preferred making things, playing with model trains and steam engines, and experimenting with model aeroplane designs.

As a high school student, he devoted considerable effort to the development of a wheel that would not suffer from punctures; basically a wheel with a perimeter formed by a series of metal plates.

== Move to Germany ==
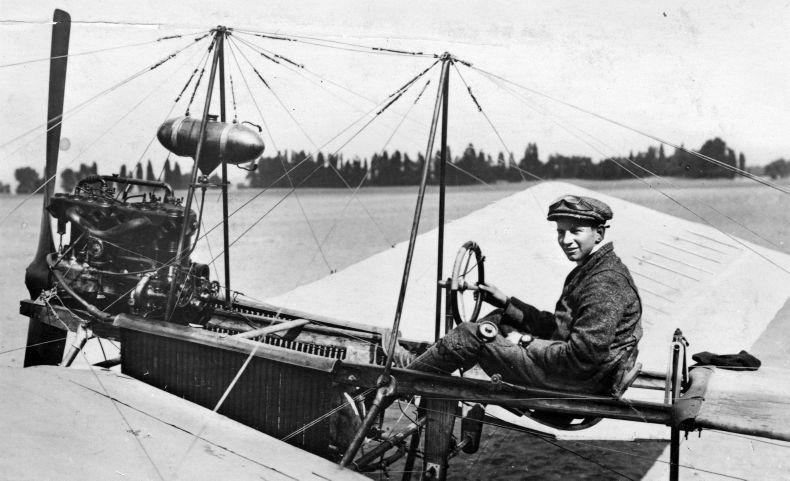
Fokker in de Spin

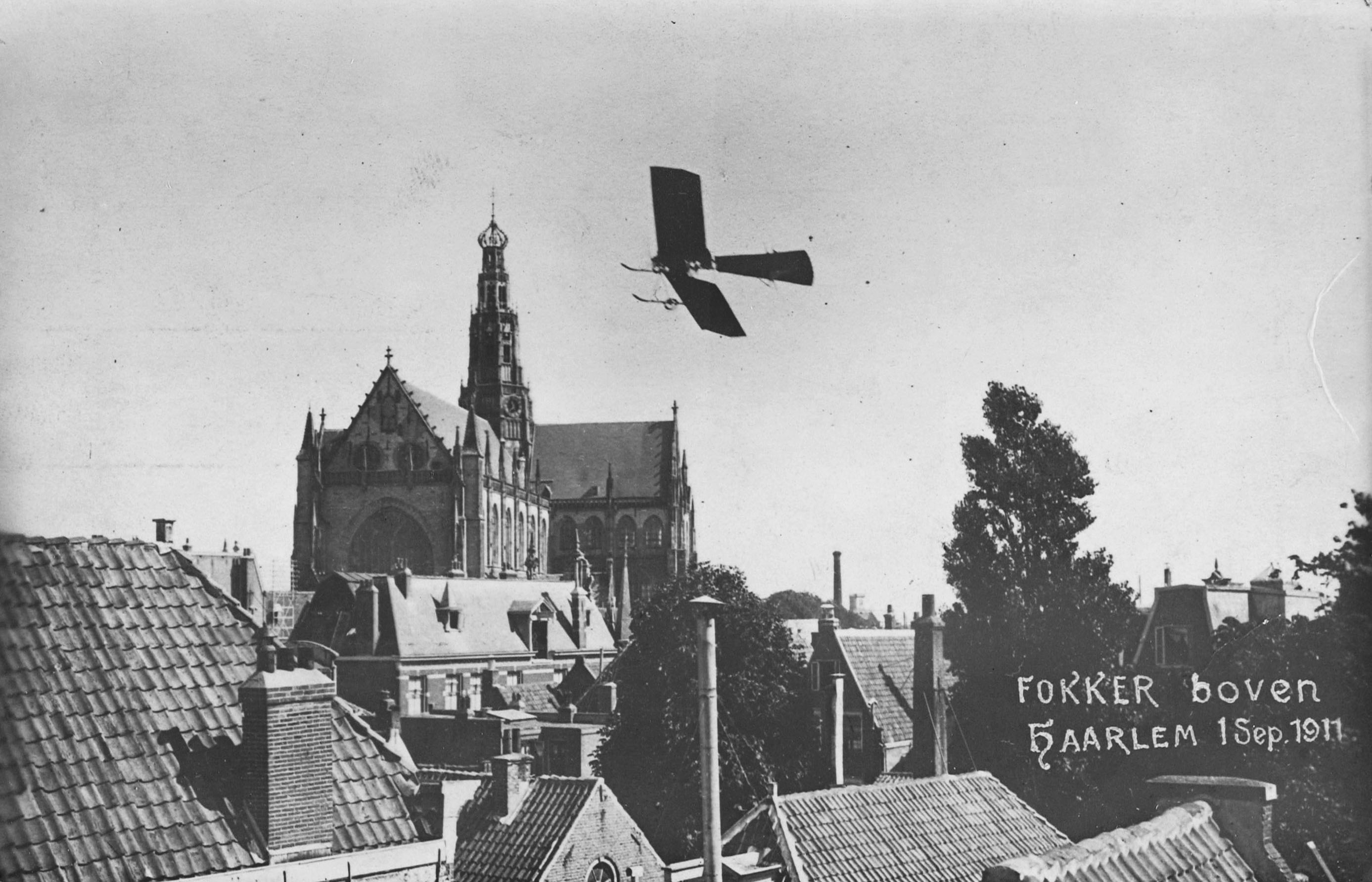
Fokker flies around the Grote Kerk in Haarlem on 1 September 1911

Fokker's interest in flight stemmed from Wilbur Wright's exhibition flights in France in the summer and fall of 1908. In 1910, aged 20, Fokker was sent by his father to Germany to receive training as an automobile mechanic at Bingen Technical school, but his interest was in flying, so he transferred to the Erste deutsche Automobil-Fachschule in Mainz. That same year Fokker built his first aircraft "de Spin" ("the Spider"), which was destroyed when his business partner flew it into a tree. He gained his flying certificate in his second "Spin" aircraft, which shortly thereafter was also destroyed by the same business partner, prompting Fokker to end their relationship. In his own country, he became a celebrity by flying around the tower of the Grote or St.-Bavokerk in Haarlem on 1 September 1911, with the third version of the "Spin". One day earlier, on Queen's Day (31 August, Queen Wilhelmina's birthday), Fokker had already taken the opportunity to make a couple of demonstration flights in Haarlem in the same aircraft.

In 1912, Fokker moved to Johannisthal near Berlin, where he founded his first own company, Fokker Aeroplanbau. In the following years he constructed a variety of aircraft. He relocated his factory to Schwerin where it was renamed Fokker Flugzeugwerke GmbH, and later shortened to Fokker Werke GmbH.

== Involvement in World War I ==
At the outbreak of World War I the German government took control of the factory. Fokker remained as director and alleged designer of many aircraft for the Imperial German Army Air Service (Luftstreitkräfte), including the Fokker Eindecker and the Fokker Dr.I, the triplane made famous in the hands of aces such as Manfred von Richthofen (the Red Baron). In all, his company delivered about 700 military aircraft to the German air force as well as supplying the German navy and Austria-Hungary.

Fokker himself was a skilled pilot, demonstrating his aircraft on many occasions. On 13 June 1915, Fokker demonstrated the new Eindecker (monoplane) at Stenay in the German 5th Army Sector in front of the German Crown Prince and other VIPs. Fokker worked closely with an accomplished military pilot, Otto Parschau, to bring the Eindecker into military use and on this occasion both men demonstrated the aircraft. Max Immelmann, later to become a high-scoring flying ace with the Eindecker, commented in a letter written shortly after this event on 25 June 1915 that: "Fokker, especially, amazed us with his skill".

Author A.R. Weyl (Fokker: The Creative Years, Putnam 1965) says that, while Fokker was a talented and bold pilot, his business character was more flawed. He failed to reinvest war profits back into his factory which consequently struggled to fulfill contracts as the factory floor was often muddled with prototype development and production taking place at the same time. Fokker distrusted qualified engineers (which he was not), and resented frequent German insistence on carrying out stringent structural tests to ensure prototype aircraft were fit for combat. He could be bad tempered and insensitive, as when he verbally abused his dying designer Martin Kreuzer on the evening of 27 June 1916, after Kreuzer had crashed the prototype Fokker D.I. The rudder jammed, but Kreuzer was able to give an oral report on the accident before he died. "Fokker hurried to the scene, and shouted reproaches at the mortally injured man". Weyl says this incident was witnessed by Reinhold Platz, who succeeded Kreuzer.

While Weyl's biography paints an unpleasant picture of Fokker as a businessman, he was a popular and charismatic figure with service pilots, and could charm even senior officers. This charm enabled him to deal with the first major crisis of his German career when his newly delivered Fokker Dr.I triplanes began to experience sudden fatal accidents in late 1917, and the type was temporarily grounded as too dangerous to fly. The triplanes' top wings frequently ripped off under aerobatic conditions and even Lothar von Richthofen (brother of Manfred) was lucky to survive one such crash. Fokker was able to prove to the German high command that the basic design was not at fault, but the German military inquiry concluded that shoddy workmanship due to poor supervision and quality control at the Fokker factory were to blame. Fokker received a stern warning about future conduct. Unfortunately the same scenario repeated itself a few months later, with the introduction of his Fokker E.V/D.VIII monoplane in mid-1918. A further high level German inquiry revealed more production and workmanship issues. Weyl asserts that the German authorities were now willing to file criminal charges against Fokker, and might have done so, had he not returned to the Netherlands shortly after the end of World War I.

Fokker's own account of the D.VIII places the blame on officious German Air Force inspectors requiring an ill-conceived design change. "When the first D-8 [sic] was submitted to the engineering division to be sandload tested, the wings proved to be sufficiently strong, but the regulations called for a proportionate strength in the rear spar compared to the front spar ... Complying with the government's edict, we strengthened the rear spar and started to produce in quantity ..." The D.VIIIs immediately ran into trouble with the wing collapsing at high speed. Fokker recalled the aircraft for further testing, and successfully demonstrated that the reinforced rear spar caused the wings to flex unevenly at speed, increasing the angle of attack at the wing tips and causing the wing to shear apart under the increased loads. The problem was resolved by restoring the rear spar to its original specifications.

Weyl also discusses claims of Fokker's outright plagiarism or taking sole credit for the work of his staff, first designer Martin Kreuzer and later Reinhold Platz. For example, contemporary German documents for the E.V/D.VIII refer to Fokker as "the designer" but Weyl and other authors now suggest that Platz was the real design genius behind the Dr.I, D.VII and D.VIII. There may be some truth in this as Platz recalled to Weyl that he attended high level meetings alongside Fokker but was never introduced or referred-to as the designer and often never even spoke. Yet when Fokker fled Germany it was Platz who immediately took over the German works on Fokker's behalf. Fokker later moved Platz to the Netherlands, as head designer, when the post-war German operation collapsed which indicates Platz really did play a greater design role than Fokker admits. Weyl uncharitably suggests that Platz's role at the Fokker D.VIII crisis meetings was to take the blame if anything was wrong and not receive credit. How much of this interpretation is based on the fact that Platz was still alive to tell his side of the story in 1965, and Fokker was not, is unclear.

Another book by Henri Hegener (who knew both Fokker and Platz personally) depicts a rather different story, saying that Platz, while a skilled craftsman (and excellent welder), had received no formal technical training, and that his contributions to the Fokker designs are exaggerated, although Hegener grants that Platz was a good "rule of thumb" designer. Hegener also contradicts the claims that Platz was treated badly by Fokker, at least not financially because Platz's year-end bonuses often exceeded his yearly salary.

== The interrupter gear ==
Fokker is often credited with having invented the synchronization device which enabled World War I aircraft to fire through the spinning propeller. His role was certainly significant, but there were a number of prior developments before the result was achieved for which Fokker is commonly credited.

The famous French pilot Roland Garros was shot down on 18 April 1915. His aircraft had been fitted with a deflector device, consisting of metal deflector wedges fitted to the propeller. Garros was able to set fire to the aircraft before being taken prisoner but the aircraft's gun and the armoured propeller remained intact and came into German hands.

This initiated a phase of consideration of the interrupter gear concept in the Imperial German Army Air Service (Luftstreitkräfte). Fokker was heavily involved in this process but the story of his conception, development and installation of a synchronization device in a period of 48 hours (first found in an authorized biography of Fokker written in 1929) has been shown to be not factual. The available evidence points to a synchronisation device having been in development with Fokker's company for perhaps six months prior to the capture of Garros' machine. Additionally there were patents filed in France, Germany and Austria-Hungary as far back as 1910 for very similar devices to that produced by Fokker. Author A. J. Weyl suggests that Fokker – or more probably someone on his production team – was aware of these patents. One patentee, Franz Schneider and his employer LVG, later sued Fokker in the German courts and won their case; but Fokker (by then in America) refused to pay.

However, the final result of the development was Fokker's pushrod control mechanism, Gestängesteuerung, which allowed the aircraft's forward-firing machine gun to fire only when the propeller was out of the line of fire. Fitted to the famous Fokker Eindecker, its use directly led to a phase of German air superiority known as the Fokker Scourge. Despite its shock effect on the enemy, the first Fokker interrupters remained unreliable and were prone to failures. Both Oswald Boelcke and Max Immelmann survived failures which resulted in propellers being shot off and even engines pulled out of their mountings due to the engine becoming unbalanced by the loss of the propeller. Immelmann's eventual death in combat has also been attributed to interrupter gear failure as the aircraft was seen to break up in mid-air while engaged against a Royal Flying Corps F.E.2b.

== Other works on aircraft armament ==
Fokker and his armament team, including Lübbe and Leimberger, also worked on lesser known projects, including a multi-barrelled machine gun, known as the Fokker-Leimberger. Although superficially similar to a Gatling gun, the action of the Fokker-Leimberger was substantially different. Problems with the gun, especially with ruptured cases, prevented its adoption into production during the war. After moving to the US, Fokker continued to work on the design, but he was ultimately unsuccessful—properly sealing the rotary split-breech was apparently very difficult. A single surviving prototype is known today at the Kentucky Military Treasures.

== Return to the Netherlands ==
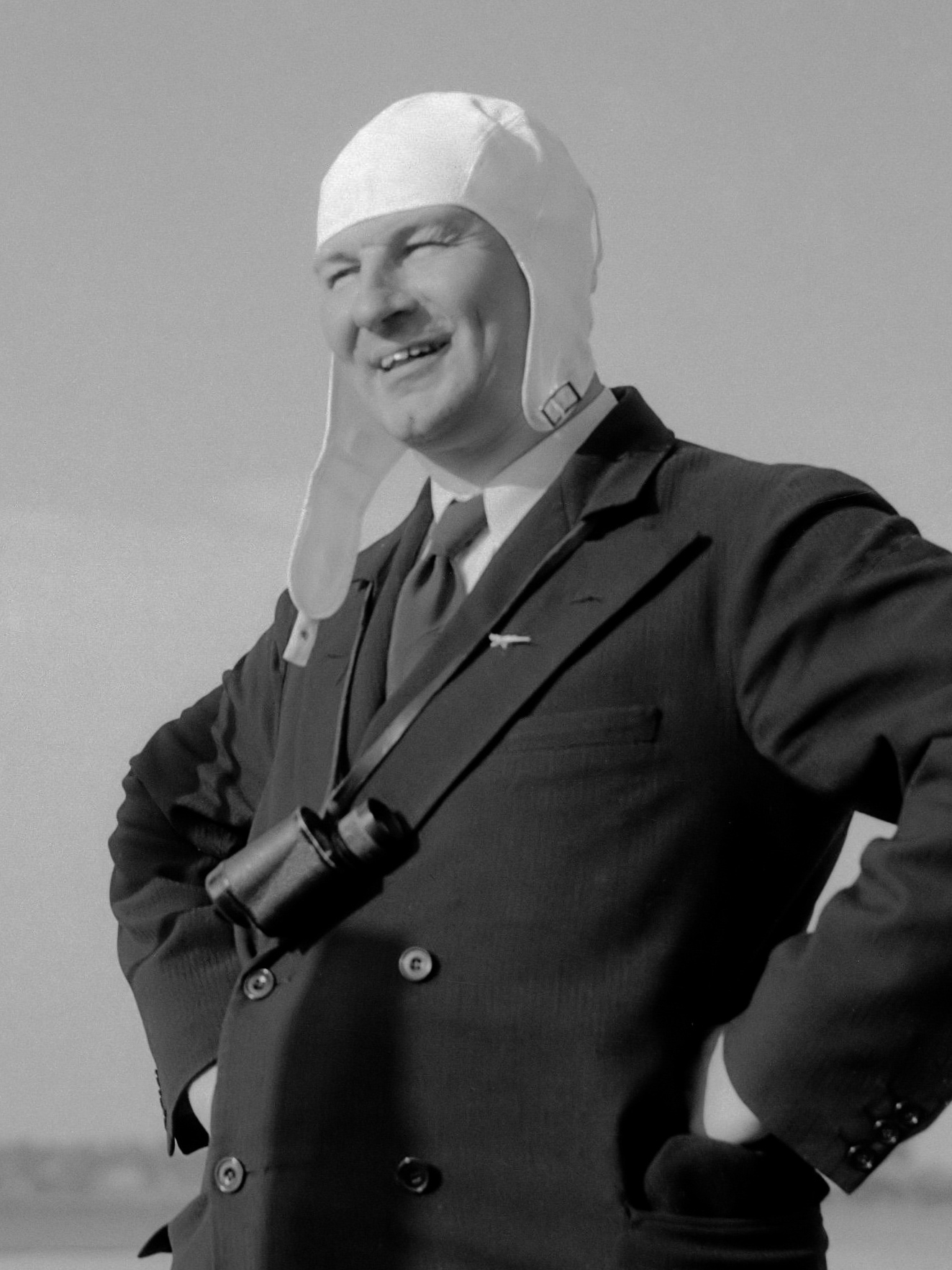
Fokker in the Netherlands in 1934

After the war's end, the terms of the Treaty of Versailles forbade Germany to build any aircraft or aircraft engines. The Armistice, not the Treaty of Versailles, singled out the Fokker D.VII for destruction or confiscation, the only aircraft to be so named. In 1919, Fokker returned to the Netherlands and started a new aircraft company, the Nederlandse Vliegtuigenfabriek (Dutch Aircraft Factory), predecessor to the Fokker Aircraft Company. Despite the strict disarmament conditions in the treaty, Fokker did not return home empty-handed: he managed to smuggle six goods trains' worth of D.VII and C.I military aircraft and spare parts out of Germany across the German-Dutch border. Author Weyl says that Fokker used 350 railway wagons and made sure that each train was too long to fit into the railway sidings where trains were normally checked for contraband. Weyl quotes Fokker himself as saying that he paid 20,000 Dutch guilders in bribes. The trains included 220 aeroplanes, more than 400 aero engines and much other material. This initial stock enabled him to quickly set up shop, but his focus shifted from military to civil aircraft such as the very successful Fokker F.VII/3m trimotor.

Fokker's admitted bribery has contributed to his reputation for sharp business practices. Weyl also points out that – in addition to possible criminal charges for the Fokker D.VIII fatal crashes – Fokker also failed to pay taxes to German authorities, and actually owed more than 14 million marks. Fokker's autobiography tells a similar story, but focuses on the rampant corruption, hyper-inflation, economic meltdown, and violent revolutionary forces of the pre-Weimar days. According to Fokker's account, as WWI progressed, the German High Command became increasingly brazen, even forcing Fokker into German citizenship against his will. Fokker describes his escape from Germany as a harrowing tale in which he protected as many workers as possible and escaped with less than a quarter of his net worth. He takes pains to rebuff the claim that he left the country owing any taxes.

== Personal life ==
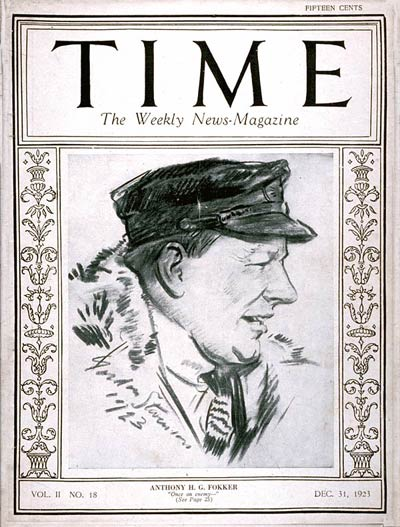
Time cover, 31 December 1923

On 25 March 1919, Fokker married Sophie Marie Elisabeth von Morgen in Haarlem. This marriage ended in divorce in 1923. In 1927, he married Canadian Violet Austman in New York City. On 8 February 1929, she died in a fall from their hotel suite window. The original police report said her death was a suicide, but this was later changed to "vertigo victim" at the request of her husband's staff. On the subject of his marriages, Fokker wrote, "I have always understood airplanes much better than women. I had more love affairs in my life, and they ended just like the first one, really, because I thought there was nothing that could be more important than my airplanes ... I have now learned, by bitter experience, that one must give a little too; in love one has to use one's brain just as much as in business, and perhaps even more".

== Move to the US and death ==
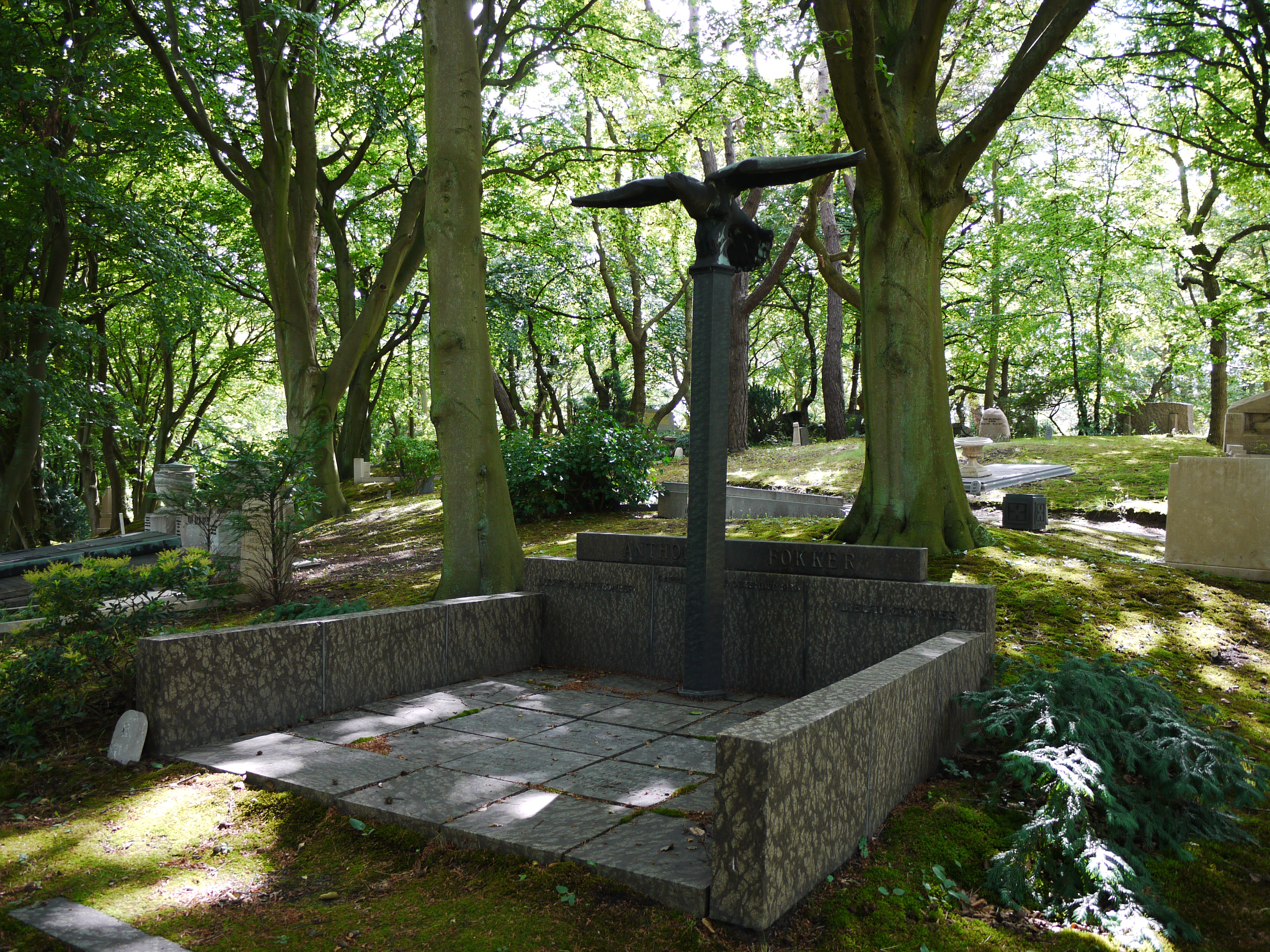
Fokker's grave in Driehuis

In or about 1926 or 1927, Fokker moved to the United States. Here he established the North American branch of his company, the Atlantic Aircraft Corporation. The company gained high visibility in daring exploits by pilots. The Fokker F.VII aircraft was used by pilot Richard E. Byrd and machinist Floyd Bennett to fly over or near the North Pole on 9 May 1926. In June 1928, Amelia Earhart crossed the Atlantic to Wales in a Fokker F.VII/3m trimotor, and in 1930 Charles Kingsford Smith circumnavigated the globe in another. However the reputation was hurt when the famous University of Notre Dame football coach Knute Rockne was killed in the crash of a Fokker F.10A in March 1931.

Fokker's Dutch and American companies were at the peak of their success in the late 1920s, but he lost control by going public to sell stock. In 1929, General Motors took over Fokker Aircraft Corporation of America, and merged it in the General Aviation Corporation. Fokker was appointed director of engineering. He resigned in 1931. Fokker designs were increasingly outdated and in 1934 General Aviation discontinued their production. They were still built in the Netherlands.

Neville Shute in 1934 negotiated with Fokker for a manufacturing licensing agreement for Airspeed Ltd (England), and found him "genial, shrewd and helpful" but "already a sick man"; and he was difficult to deal with as "his domestic life was irregular". He worked "at all hours and in strange places". Frequently "his very efficient legal advisor and secretary could not tell us where he was". Shute said he was "a good chooser of men" and had a "most efficient staff of Dutchmen and ex-Germans".

Fokker died at age 49 in New York in 1939 from pneumococcal meningitis, after a three-week-long illness. In 1940, his ashes were brought to Westerveld Cemetery in Driehuis, North Holland, where they were buried in the family grave.

In 1970, Fokker was inducted into the International Air & Space Hall of Fame.

In 1980, Fokker was inducted into the National Aviation Hall of Fame in Dayton, Ohio.

== Popular culture ==
Fokker's nickname was The Flying Dutchman. In popular media, Hurd Hatfield portrayed him in the 1971 film Von Richthofen and Brown. The character Roy Fokker from the animated series Super Dimension Fortress Macross and its prequel Macross Zero was named in honor of Anthony Fokker and Roy Brown, the Royal Air Force pilot who is officially credited with downing Manfred von Richthofen's Fokker Dr.I. Fokker is portrayed by Craig Kelly in the Young Indiana Jones Chronicles: Attack of the Hawkmen.

One of KLM's Boeing 747-200s, registration serial PH-BUN, was named after Fokker and operated for the airline from 1979 until 2004. The aircraft was scrapped after the end of its service with KLM.

== Television series ==
Turbulent Skies is a 2020 Dutch television series comprising eight episodes depicting Anthony Fokker's and Albert Plesman's achievements.

== See also ==
- Jan Hilgers
- Vecihi Hürkuş

== Bibliography ==
- Boyne, Walter J. The Smithsonian Book of Flight for Young People. Washington, DC: Smithsonian Institution, 1988. ISBN 0-689-31422-1.
- Dierikx, Marc. Fokker: A Transatlantic Biography. Washington, DC: Smithsonian Institution Press, 1997. ISBN 1-56098-735-9.
- Fokker, Anthony and Bruce Gould. Flying Dutchman: The Life of Anthony Fokker. London: George Routledge, 1931.
- Hegener, Henri; Bruce Robinson (ed.) Fokker – The Man and the Aircraft. Lethchworth: Harleyford, 1961.
- Molson, K. M. Pioneering in Canadian Air Transport. Winnipeg: James Richardson & Sons, Ltd., 1974. ISBN 0-919212-39-5.
- Nevin, David. The Pathfinders (The Epic of Flight Series). Alexandria, Virginia: Time-Life Books, 1980. ISBN 0-8094-3256-0.
- Postma, Thijs. Fokker: Aircraft Builders to the World. London: Jane's, 1979. ISBN 0-7106-0059-3.
- Wepman, Dennis. "Fokker, Anthony" American National Biography (2006) online
- Weyl, A. R. Fokker: The Creative Years. London, Putnam publications, 1965

Awards and achievements
| Preceded by George Bernard Shaw | Cover of Time magazine 31 December 1923 | Succeeded by William G. McAdoo |
