= Arthur Rhys-Davids =

British World War I flying ace

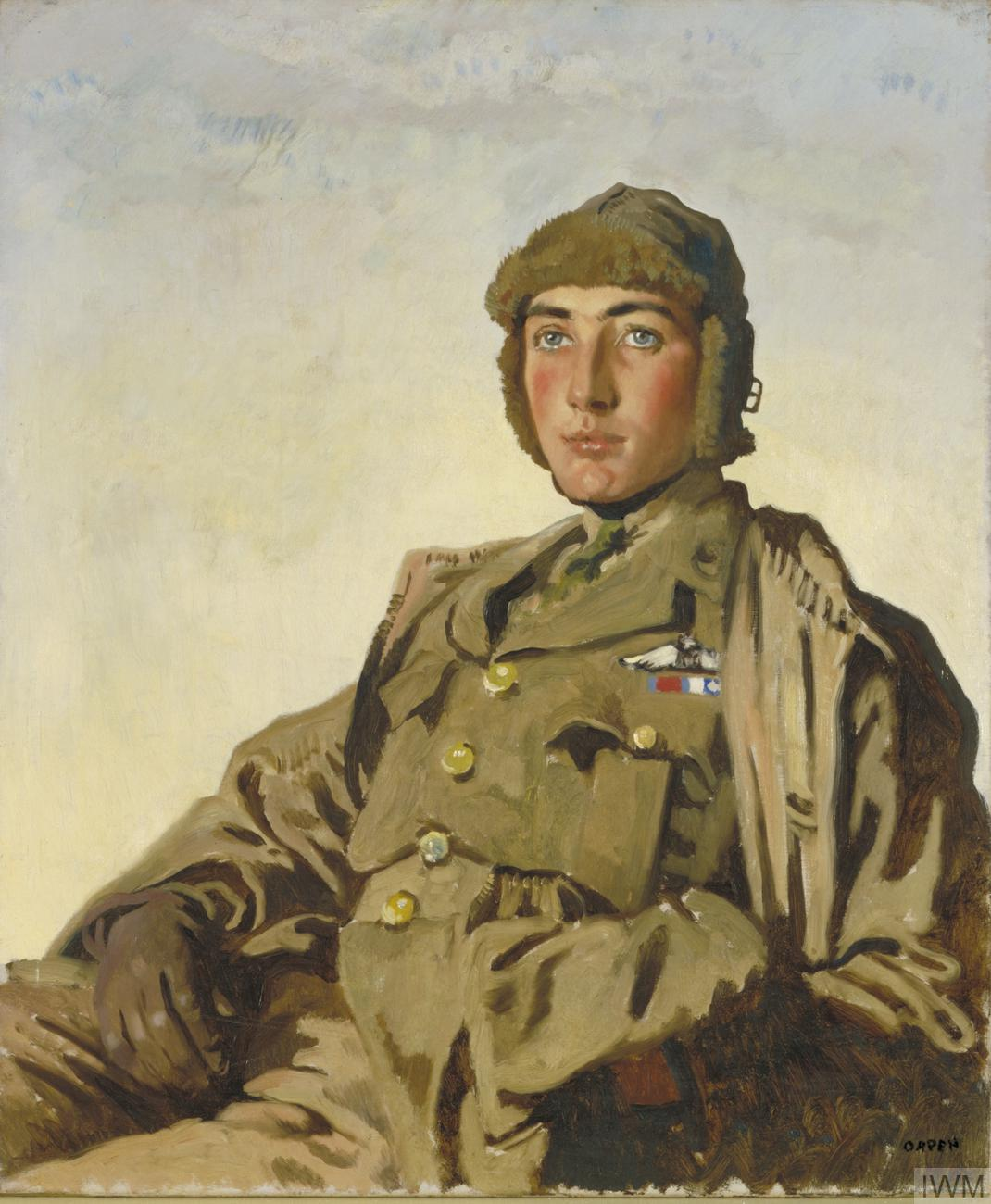
- Lieut. A. P. F. Rhys Davids, DSO, MC painted by William Orpen, October 1917
- Born: 26 September 1897; Forest Hill, London, England
- Died: 27 October 1917 (aged 20); Roeselare, West Flanders, Belgium
- Relatives: Thomas Rhys-Davids (father); Caroline Rhys-Davids (mother)
- Military career
- Allegiance: United Kingdom
- Branch: Royal Flying Corps
- Service years: 1916–1917
- Rank: Lieutenant
- Unit: No. 56 Squadron RFC
- Conflicts: World War I
- Awards: Distinguished Service Order; Military Cross & Bar

Arthur Percival Foley Rhys-Davids, DSO, MC & Bar (26 September 1897 – 27 October 1917) was an English flying ace of the First World War.

Rhys-Davids was born in 1897 to a distinguished family. His father was a professional academic and his mother a prolific author. At school he showed considerable potential in all subjects and was an excellent student. At the age of 14 Rhys-Davids joined Eton College as a King's Scholar. He gained his School Certificate in July 1913 with higher marks than any other student. In 1914 war had broken out and in mid-1916 Rhys-Davids applied for a commission in the Royal Flying Corps. On 28 August 1916 he reported for training which he completed in the spring of 1917 and was assigned to No. 56 Squadron RFC on 7 March 1917.

Rhys-Davids gained his first victory on 23 May 1917 and began a steady run of success. Only two days later he gained his fifth air victory and became an ace. It was during the Third Battle of Ypres (July–November 1917) that Rhys-Davids scored the majority of his successes, gaining 22 more victories by the time of his death. On 23 September Rhys-Davids shot down the German ace Werner Voss (48 victories), who was killed; and possibly also Carl Menckhoff (39 victories). By 11 October 1917, Rhys-Davids had shot down five more enemy aircraft for an official total of 27 aerial victories – 23 of them individual kills.

Rhys-Davids had earned a reputation as a "fighter", and pursued enemy aircraft wherever and whenever he spotted them. On 27 October 1917 he pursued a group of German aircraft over Roeselare, Belgium. He was never seen or heard from again. Post-war analysis suggests Rhys-Davids may have been shot down by German ace Karl Gallwitz. Despite disappearing less than five miles from the crash site of Werner Voss, shot down by Rhys-Davids one month earlier, his remains have never been found.

== Early life ==
=== Family and education ===
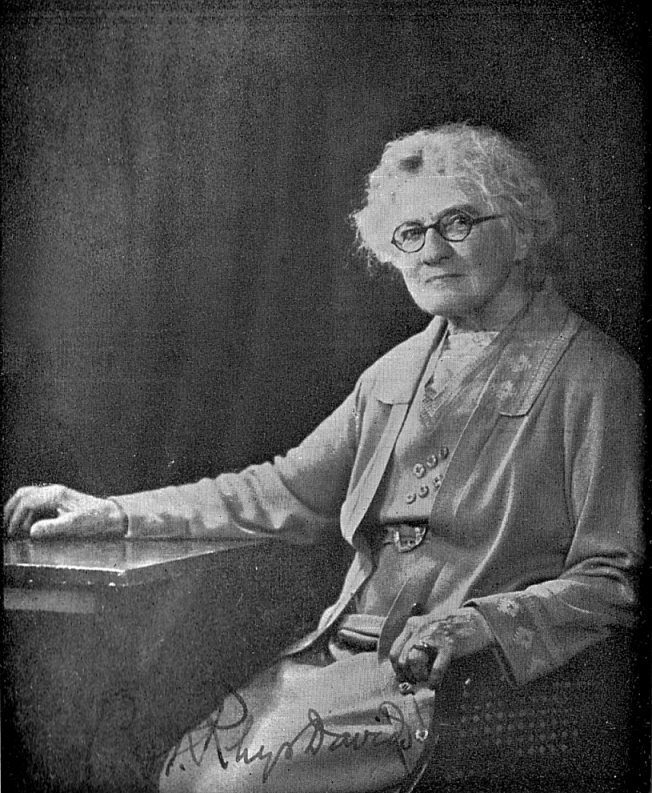
Rhys-Davids's mother, Caroline Augusta Foley Rhys Davids, a successful author

Rhys-Davids was born to Thomas William Rhys-Davids and Caroline Augusta Foley Rhys-Davids in Forest Hill, London. His father was of Anglo-Welsh descent and his mother was English. Thomas Rhys-Davids was born in 1843 the son of a Congregational minister. After schooling at Brighton he refused to be trained as a solicitor and he enrolled at Breslau University to study Sanskrit in which he took a PhD. While there, he learned Pali and studied Buddhism. In 1864 he joined the Ceylon Civil Service as acting secretary to the Governor. While acting as a magistrate Rhys-Davids ruled in favour of a native over an Englishman during a land-ownership dispute leading him to be ostracised by the British community on the island. In 1872 he left for England. In 1877 he passed the Bar examination but practised little law. In 1877 he joined the Middle Temple and four years later founded the Pali Text Society, translating Buddhist literature. In 1882 he was appointed Professor of Pali at University College London. It was there he met Caroline Foley.

Caroline Augusta Foley was born in 1859, one of ten children of Reverend John Foley and Caroline Augusta Windham. Rhys-Davids' great-grandfather was Vice Admiral William Lukin who had assumed the name Windham in 1824 upon inheriting Felbrigg Hall. Caroline joined University College London and gained her Bachelor of Arts degree in 1886. She was awarded a master's degree in 1889 and was elected a fellow in 1896. While reading Economics, Caroline was advised by her professor to further her interests in Indian philosophy by studying Sanskrit and Pali. Upon contacting the language department she was assigned to Professor Rhys-Davids. They began a relationship which was formalised into marriage in 1894.

The couple had three children within the first three years: Vivien Brynhilda Carloine Foley (b. July 1895 – 1978), Arthur Percival Foley (b. 27 September 1897) and a second daughter, Nesta Foley (1900–1973). Unlike most parents of the Victorian era, they spent a great deal of their time with their children, although they employed a child minder named Minna, a German woman. The first words of Arthur and his sister were German and the children often used German phrases. Nevertheless, Rhys-Davids's parents continued to be busy academics. In 1905 his father became a professor at the University of Manchester. His mother became a prolific author.

At the age of three Rhys-Davids started kindergarten at the Manor Mount High School in Forest Hill. In 1905 he left Manor Mount High School, sixth in his class, before spending the summer in Switzerland by Lake Champex.

On 27 September 1905 he joined the Sale, Brooklands and Ashton-Upon-Mersey High School for Boys. Excelling at school, his parents sent him to Doctor Summerfield's Preparatory School near Oxford. Rhys-Davids stayed there until September 1910, when he completed the Scholarship examinations for Eton College. After two and a half days of exams, Rhys-Davids was questioned by a formidable array of Eton notables. Rhys-Davids was duly elected as a Colleger—a term used for successful candidates, who usually numbered 10. There were two types of pupil: Oppidans—fee-paying pupils numbering 1,000—and King's Scholars or Collegers. The distinction was held to be between money and ability; Oppidans viewed Collegers, financially poorer, as "unwashed saps, tugs and swots", while Collegers regarded Oppidans as "philistines" and "hearties".

In spring 1911 he was enrolled at Eton College as a King's Scholar. Despite poor health—he was asthmatic and had other unspecified maladies—he took part in football, cricket, the Eton Wall Game, and the Eton Field Game. He was also an accomplished rugby player. Rhys-Davids excelled at Classics—Ancient Greek and Latin.

In July 1913 Rhys-Davids won his Division or Class, beating his nearest rival by 53 marks. In Eton terms, he was now considered a specialist. On 12 December 1915 he was nominated for the Newcastle (Domus Exhibition) Scholarship to Balliol College, Oxford, and by 1916 was named Captain of the School. He was also inducted into the Eton Debating Society. As a person of consequence he was mentioned in The Eton Chronicle, the school's newspaper. On 7 April 1916 it was announced that Rhys-Davids had won the Newcastle Scholarship. At this point, Rhys-Davids gave the first indication he was interested in becoming a pilot and joining the Royal Flying Corps (RFC).

=== Royal Flying Corps ===
On 28 August 1916 Rhys-Davids reported to No. 2 School of Aeronautics at Oxford and billeted in Exeter College, Oxford. Rhys-Davids began flight training but did not enjoy life in the British Army and complained about the "coarse and uneducated company". Rhys-Davids's time did not last long at Exeter, for he was transferred to the Central Flying School at Upavon Aerodrome for further training. One of his instructors there was Keith Muspratt, who was the same age as Rhys-Davids and had been educated at Selborne College in East London, South Africa. He had taken his Royal Aero Club certificate in his last year of school; a talented pilot, the RFC recognised his ability and commissioned him as an instructor. Rhys-Davids became firm friends with Muspratt.

Rhys-Davids completed basic training by flying three hours solo at Netheravon. He graduated to operational types. He hoped to gain his flight certificates by Christmas 1916, but that involved 25 hours solo flying, night landings, cross country, artillery observations, bomb dropping and aerial photography. At Upavon he flew Royal Aircraft Factory B.E.2s and Avro 504s. By December 1916 he had completed his training and was flying without an instructor regularly.

By late January 1917 Rhys-Davids was flying Sopwith Pups almost exclusively. On 28 January he "looped" one for the first time. At the end of the month he was sent to Turnberry Airfield and Ayrshire for gunnery training. The course finished on 1 March 1917 and he was given leave. By 6 March he was back at Upavon awaiting a posting. On 7 March he received news he was to be posted to No. 56 Squadron RFC. The squadron boasted the most famous ace in the RFC—Captain Albert Ball, a fighter pilot with 30 air victories. The squadron had also re-equipped with the S.E.5, considered one of the most successful designs of the First World War. On 7 April 1917, Rhys-Davids left for France.

== War service ==
=== From beginner to ace ===
Rhys-Davids' beginning as a fighter pilot was inauspicious. He misjudged a landing and totally wrecked his SE5 A4847 when it overturned on landing and broke its fuselage in two. Rhys-Davids sprained his back. Lacking an aircraft he was effectively grounded for a month. After a brief test on 2 May 1917 in A4868 Rhys-Davids flew his first combat mission the following morning escorting Martinsyde G.100 bombers from 27 Squadron.

On 7 May Rhys-Davids took part in a disastrous sortie. The day was cloudy with thick layers of cumulus between 2,000 and 10,000 feet. Rhys-Davids's flight kept just below the cloud to avoid attack, and headed towards Cambrai. Eleven Royal Aircraft Factory SE5s of 56 Squadron ran into the experienced German airmen of Jasta 11 of the Flying Circus. One of the Squadron 56 flight commanders, famous ace Albert Ball (44 victories), was killed when he likely flew into the ground after becoming disorientated in low-lying cloud. Three other British pilots were shot down, including Rhys-Davids. He came under attack from an Albatros D.V which was painted red, with a green band behind the cockpit. The pilot was Kurt Wolff, a very experienced pilot and ace with 20 victories. Rhys-Davids was unaware he was under attack until he saw Wolff's tracers pass his aircraft. He evaded Wolff's initial attack and a duel for position followed. Rhys-Davids's guns jammed but he managed to get up to Wolff's height and took evasive action. But he had taken hits to the wing, undercarriage and engine. He kept cool and continued turning, denying the German an easy shot. As Rhys-Davids was deciding just how best to escape his hazardous position, Wolff abandoned the fight and headed for Douai. Rhys-Davids headed for British lines, his engine streaming water; west of Arras his engine finally seized up. He attempted to glide to Belle Vue but had insufficient height and force-landed near La Herliere. The reason for Wolff's decision to break off combat is unknown. He may have run out of ammunition or perhaps was low on fuel.

More bad luck followed as A4868 seemed plagued with engine trouble and he was forced to crash-land again on 18 May. On 20 May he flew a bomber escort mission and fought off an interception by German fighters.

On 23 May, Rhys-Davids gained his first victory, shooting an Albatros D.III fighter down out of control. On 24 May he scored three victories in an hour. One day later, he shot down another for his fifth victory and became a flying ace. The second to fifth victories were against enemy observer aircraft; Rhys-Davids repeated the tactics of diving and eliminating the gunner before bringing down the aircraft. In late May No. 56 Squadron moved to Saint-Omer. On 26 May he destroyed another Albatros followed by another on 4 and 7 June, the former date being the first day of the seven-day battle for Messines. On 5 June 1917, after his sixth triumph, he received a telegram informing him that along with Captain Cyril M. Crowe and Second Lieutenant Reginald Hoidge he had been awarded the Military Cross (MC). During the last battle Rhys-Davids's SE5, A4563, had its propeller damaged and its right top wing's main spar was shattered by ground fire.

In June, Rhys-Davids returned to England to take part in Home Defence duties. He returned to France in late June. On 12 July Rhys-Davids bounced and shot down an enemy scout then followed it up with a DFW CV which crash-landed. Its crew—Eugen Mann and Albert Hahnel—were taken prisoner. Hahnel was badly wounded. Rhys-Davids followed this success with victories against Albatros' on 13, 17 and 21 July 1917.

The beginning of the Third Ypres Campaign on 31 July provided Rhys-Davids with the opportunity to increase his successes. On 3 September, he destroyed an Albatros D.V. On the 5th, he shot down two more D.Vs and drove another one out of the battle claiming it out of control, all within 45 minutes. On 9 September he scored again, downing two more Albatros' whilst dispatching another on 14 September.

=== A famous dogfight ===
On 23 September, Rhys-Davids was the victor in one of the most famous dogfights of the war. McCudden led the Squadron on a trip over the front lines at 9,000 feet. There were large numbers of aircraft, both British and German, in the air. McCudden dived on a German reconnaissance machine and shot it down.

Re-grouping at 6,000 feet another German formation was spotted. McCudden was about to attack, but noticed ahead, an SE5 spinning down with a German fighter on its tail. The SE5, from No. 609 Squadron RFC, was piloted by a Lieutenant Harold A. Hamersley. His aircraft mortally wounded, he spun downwards hoping to throw the German off and get closer to the ground. The German stayed behind, firing all the way. A fellow member of 609, Chidlaw-Roberts, attempted to assist, but was shot up by the German Fokker F.I pilot and retired from the fray. Squadron leader Caldwell, 609, saw the approaching SE5s of 56 Squadron. Believing odds of seven-to-one to be good odds, he "left them (the SE5's) to it".

McCudden and Rhys-Davids attacked from the left and right and soon the German was in the midst of six British machines. McCudden explained;

...the German triplane was in the middle of our formation, and its handling was wonderful to behold. The pilot seemed to be firing at us all simultaneously, and although I got behind him a second time, I could hardly stay there for a second. His movements were so quick and uncertain...

Werner Voss. The victor in 48 dogfights was eventually defeated by Rhys-Davids and his six comrades after an epic ten-minute battle.

Rhys-Davids, James McCudden, Geoffrey Hilton Bowman, Richard Maybery, Keith Muspratt, and Verschoyle Cronyn were all now engaged in battle with the tenacious German, who made no attempt to escape. He fired on and hit McCudden in the wing, and forced Muspratt and Cronyn out of the battle with hits to their engines. C Flight arrived, led by Reginald Hoidge, as another German fighter, a red-nosed Albatros, arrived to assist the besieged triplane. Hoidge and Maybery attempted to attack the triplane but were unsuccessful, as was a counter-move by the Germans which was broken up by McCudden and Rhys-Davids. As Rhys-Davids attacked the Fokker the Albatros engaged him from astern. Maybery forced it to disengage. The triplane was now alone in the fight.

The German repeatedly evaded the British fighters' attacks. Eventually he made a flat turn, enabling Rhys-Davids to get onto his tail. Bowman believed the German was momentarily distracted and intent on attacking himself, otherwise doubting Rhys-Davids' ability to get onto the Fokker's tail so easily. With his propeller "boss almost on the rudder" Rhys-Davids fired.

The Fokker dived, level and straight for the first time, toward German lines. Rhys-Davids remained behind and then turned away. As Rhys-Davids turned away the German made a fatal error. He turned with the Englishman and brought his machine back into Rhys-Davids' path. Rhys-Davids fired an entire drum of ammunition at the German and broke off to avoid a collision. Climbing, Rhys-Davids saw the German machine, its engine off, heading west. Rhys-Davids made several more attacks with the Fokker going down in a shallow right-hand turn. McCudden saw the machine crash:

he was very low... still being engaged by an SE... the pilot being Rhys-Davids. I noticed the triplane's movements were very erratic... I saw him go into a steep dive... and then saw the triplane hit the ground and disappear into a thousand fragments.
As long as I live I shall never forget my admiration for that German pilot, who single-handed fought seven of us for ten minutes and also put some bullets through all our machines. His flying was wonderful, his courage magnificent, and in my opinion he was the bravest German airman whom it has been my privilege to see fight.

While McCudden watched the triplane crash, Rhys-Davids spotted the Albatros and dispatched it, firing from 100 to 30 yards and severely damaging the machine which force-landed. (The Albatros is said in some accounts to have belonged to Carl Menckhoff, but Menckhoff made no mention of this engagement in his later memoirs, and his involvement has been questioned.) Rhys-Davids then returned to base at 18:35–18:40. That evening there was much speculation about the identity of the German pilot. The Germans soon announced that an ace pilot named Werner Voss had not returned from a sortie and was posted as missing in action. Rhys-Davids came in for a shower of congratulations from the Squadron upon learning the identity of his victory. Rhys-Davids was less sanguine; he lamented to McCudden; "if only I could have brought him down alive".

=== Final flight ===
During the next three weeks, Rhys-Davids would gain five more victories, his last on 11 October 1917. On 1 October 1917 he was awarded the Distinguished Service Order. It was announced in the London Gazette on 18 March 1918:

2nd Lt. Arthur Percival Foley Rhys Davids, M.C., R.F.C., Spec Res. For conspicuous gallantry and devotion to duty in bringing down nine enemy aircraft in nine weeks. He is a magnificent fighter, never failing to locate enemy aircraft and invariably attacking regardless of the numbers against him.

The same day he was selected by Hugh Trenchard and Maurice Baring to have his portrait sketched by artist William Orpen. Orpen remembered "he hated fighting, hated flying, loved books and was terribly anxious for the war to be over, so that he could get to Oxford".

His final tally was 27 enemy aircraft; one shot down in flames, one 'destroyed in flames', one 'driven down', two 'forced to land', 15 'out of control' and seven destroyed. His fighting spirit won admiration from his commanding officer James McCudden:

If one was over the salient in the autumn of 1917 and saw an SE5 fighting like hell amidst a heap of huns, one would find nine times out of ten the SE5 was flown by Rhys-Davids.

On 27 October 1917 Rhys-Davids was promoted to lieutenant, backdated to 1 September 1917. That same day he took off on a routine patrol and was last seen flying east of Roeselare chasing a group of German Albatros fighters. The Luftstreitkräfte (German Air Service) credited Karl Gallwitz with shooting him down. It was not until 29 December 1917 that a report came through that a German aircraft had dropped a note to inform the RFC of Rhys-Davids's death.

In March 1920 Rhys-Davids's mother presented the rudder from the plane of Werner Voss—the ace shot down by Rhys-Davids a month before his own death—to the Imperial War Museum. It had been brought back from France by Gerald Maxwell in July 1918. In October 1920 the Secretary of the War Office secured the effects of Rhys-Davids from Germany through diplomatic channels. Rhys-Davids has no known grave, but his name is engraved on the Air Services Memorial at Arras, France.

== See also ==
- List of people who disappeared

== List of victories ==
Victory No.	Date	Location	Kills	Notes
1.	23 May 1917	East of Lens	Albatros D.III	Out of control
2–4.	24 May 1917	South of Doui/Gouy-sous-Bellone/Sains.	Three Single-seaters	Out of control First shared with B Flight.
5.	25 May 1917	Lens	Two-seater	Destroyed
6.	26 May 1917	Gouy-sous-Bellone	Albatros D.III	Out of control.
7.	4 June 1917	West of Moorslede.	Albatros D.III	Destroyed.
8.	7 June 1917	Westroosebeke	Albatros D.III	Out of control
9–10.	12 July 1917	Brickfield/East of Roncq	DFW C.V and Fokker D.V	Forced to land/out of control. First victory DFW CV 799/17.Fl/Abt.7 Leutnant Mann and Unteroffizier Hahnel prisoner of war.
11.	13 July 1917	Menin	Albatros D.III	Out of control.
12.	17 July 1917	Menin	Albatros D.III	Out of control. Shared with B Flight.
13.	21 July 1917	Polygon Wood	Albatros D.III	Out of control.
14.	3 September 1917	Houthem	Albatros D.III	Destroyed. Shared with Maybery.
15–17.	5 September 1917	East of Menin/East of Menin/Poelcapelle	Three Albatros D.III	Out of control/Two destroyed. One possibly Alfred Muth from Jasta 27.
18–19.	9 September 1917	Houthulst Forest/Moorslede	Two Albatros D.III	Destroyed/driven down.
20.	14 September 1917	Menin	Albatros D.III	Out of control. Possibly a Leutnant Gross from Jasta 10.
21–22.	23 September 1917	Both North-East of Ypres Salient	Fokker Dr.I/Albatros D.III	Destroyed/Forced to land. Werner Voss (Jasta 10), killed in action; and possibly Carl Menckhoff (Jasta 3), crash-landed.
23.	24 September 1917	Houthulst Forest	Two seater	Destroyed in Flames. The Machine, from Fliegerabteilung 256, crashed killing Carl von Esmarch and Hans Fleischer.
24.	28 September 1917	Comines	Albatros D.III	Out of control.
25–26.	1 October 1917	Westroosebeke	Two Albatros D.III	Both Out of control. Shared first with B Flight
27.	11 October 1917	Beceleare	Albatros D.III	Out of control.

== Bibliography ==
- Franks, Norman. SE 5/5a Aces of World War 1. Osprey, Oxford. 2007. ISBN 978-1-84603-180-9
- Revell, Alex. Brief Glory: The Life of Arthur Rhys Davids, DSO, MC and Bar. Pen & Sword Aviation, Barnsley, 2010, ISBN 1-84884-162-0.
- Revell, Alex and Dempsey, Harry. No 56 Sqn RAF/RFC. Osprey publishing, Oxford, 2009, ISBN 978-1-84603-428-2
