= Lieut A. P. F. Rhys Davids, DSO, MC (1897–1917) =

Painting by William Orpen

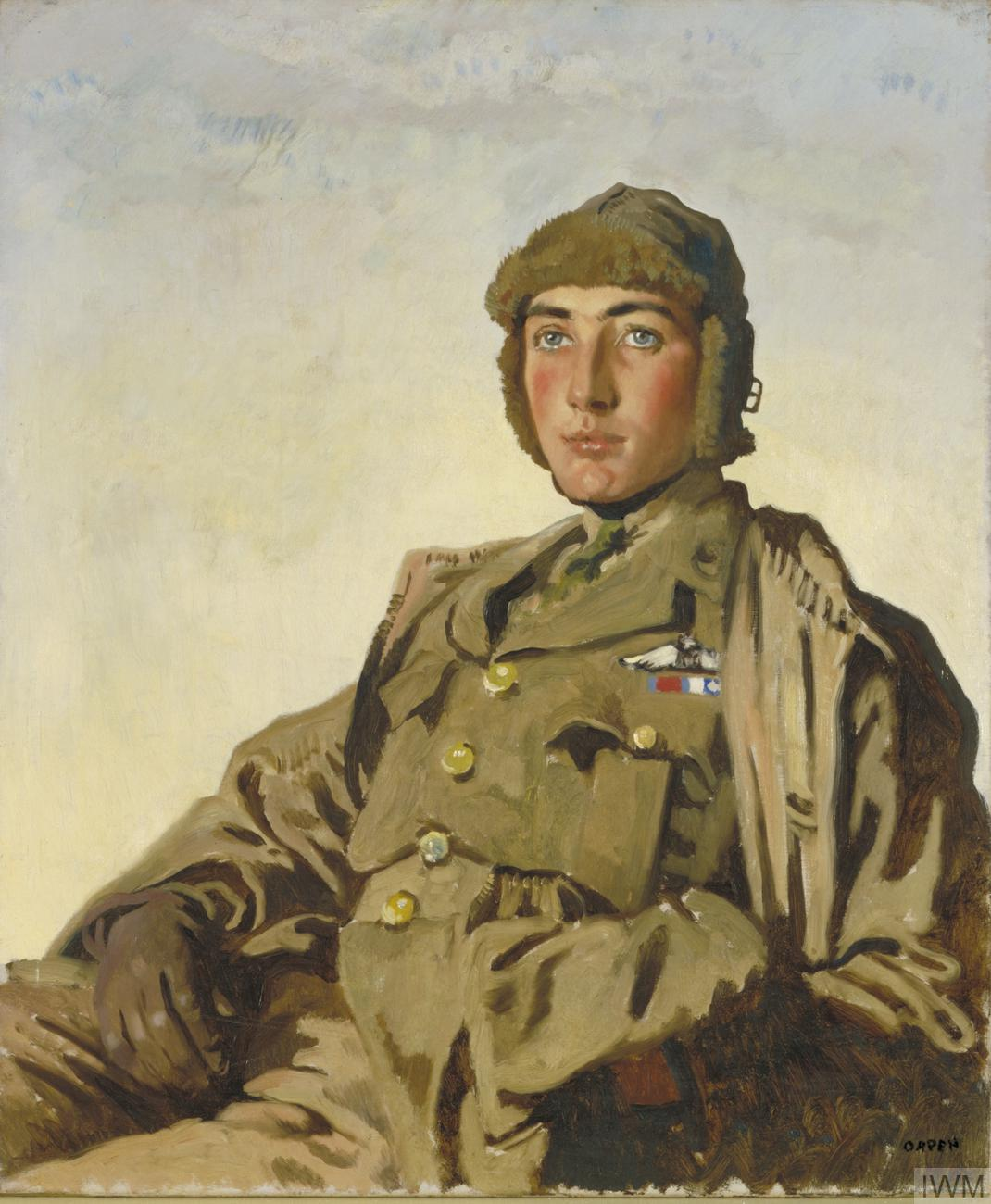
- Artist: Sir William Orpen
- Year: 1917
- Type: oil on canvas
- Dimensions: 76.2 cm × 91.4 cm (30.0 in × 36.0 in)
- Location: Imperial War Museum, London

Lieut A. P. F. Rhys Davids, DSO, MC (1897–1917) is an oil on canvas painting by the Irish artist William Orpen, from 1917. The painting is signed “Orpen” at the lower right, though it bears no date. It is held at the Imperial War Museum, in London.

== History ==
Orpen made the portrait during the First World War, in France, depicting the British fighter pilot Arthur Rhys-Davids, only weeks before the young airman was killed in combat at the age of 20.

Arthur Percival Foley Rhys-Davids (1897–1917) was one of the most celebrated British fighter pilots of the First World War. After joining the Royal Flying Corps in 1916, he quickly distinguished himself in aerial combat. He became widely known for shooting down the German ace Werner Voss, in September 1917, a feat that brought him considerable celebrity in Britain. Rhys-Davids was awarded the Military Cross and later the Distinguished Service Order for his achievements. By the time Orpen painted him in 1917, he had already gained the reputation of a rising star among RFC pilots. Only a few weeks after the portrait was completed, Rhys-Davids was killed in action on 27 October 1917 during a dogfight over Belgium. His body was never recovered.

Orpen served as an official war artist during the First World War. In 1917 he was working in France, where he produced numerous portraits of soldiers, officers, and pilots. The commission came from the British Department of Information, the wartime propaganda office that later became the Ministry of Information. The Department of Information commissioned him as part of its efforts to document and publicize the war.

Orpen met Rhys-Davids shortly before the young pilot's death. Contemporary accounts suggest that Orpen was struck by his combination of youthful appearance, modesty, and exceptional skill as an aviator. The portrait was likely completed rapidly, as Orpen was working under wartime conditions and Rhys-Davids was frequently on active duty.

The painting reflects Orpen's characteristic blend of realism and psychological insight. His war portraits often emphasize the individuality and vulnerability of their subjects, contrasting with the heroic imagery common in wartime propaganda.

== Description ==
Orpen depicts Arthur Rhys-Davids seated in a half-length portrait. The young officer wears the khaki uniform of the Royal Flying Corps, set against a background of blended yellow and blue tones suggesting an open sky.

Rhys-Davids sits on an unspecified piece of furniture, his body cropped by the lower and left edges of the canvas. Orpen presents him in a relaxed pose, leaning slightly back, with his right hand resting loosely on his thigh and his left hand tucked into his trouser pocket. Although parts of the painting, such as the lower right corner, show a freer, more expressive brushwork, the uniform itself is rendered with considerable detail.

The sitter wears a shirt and tie, trousers, a buttoned tunic, and an open greatcoat. His right hand is gloved in leather, and he wears on his head a fur‑lined flying helmet that covers both ears. Small details are carefully observed: the buckle on the helmet, the polished brass buttons of the tunic, and the service distinctions on his chest. These include the RFC pilot's brevet (the winged badge) and, beneath it, the ribbon bar representing his decorations, the Distinguished Service Order and the Military Cross, which appear as postnominals in the painting's title.

Orpen devoted particular attention to the face. Painted with fine, precise brushwork, the features have an almost photographic clarity. Rhys-Davids’ youthful appearance is marked by a long nose, narrow mouth, pointed chin, and smooth, slightly flushed skin. His bright blue eyes, set beneath dark eyebrows, are wide open and directed not toward the viewer but toward a distant point—perhaps in the sky.

== Provenance ==
After its completion, the painting entered the holdings of the Imperial War Museum in London, where it remains today. It forms part of the museum's extensive collection of First World War art commissioned by the British government.

The portrait is frequently reproduced in publications about the Royal Flying Corps and early military aviation, and it is considered one of Orpen's most compelling wartime likenesses.

== See also ==
- List of paintings by William Orpen
