= Mary Foley =

Mary Foley may refer to:

- Mary Cecilia Foley (1859–1925) British geologist and university administrator
- Mary Cleophas Foley (1845–1928), Superior General of the Sisters of Providence of Saint Mary-of-the-Woods, Indiana
- Mary Jo Foley (born 1961), American freelance technology writer
- Mary Foley Benson (1905–1992), American scientific illustrator and fine artist
- Mary Foley-Berkeley, 17th Baroness Berkeley (1905–1992), English politician and peeress
