= Harold A. Hamersley =

Australian flying ace (1896–1967)

Harold Alan Hamersley
- Born: 6 February 1896; Guildford, Western Australia
- Died: 4 December 1967 (aged 71)
- Military career
- Allegiance: Australia; United Kingdom
- Branch: Australian Imperial Force; Royal Flying Corps; Royal Air Force
- Service years: 1915–1945
- Rank: Group Captain
- Unit: No. 60 Squadron RFC
- Commands: RAF Hullavington
- Conflicts: First World War; Second World War
- Awards: Military Cross

Harold Alan Hamersley MC (6 February 1896 – December 1967) was an Australian World War I flying ace credited with 13 confirmed aerial victories. He later went on to serve in the Royal Air Force following the war, serving in India and reaching the rank of group captain before retiring.

== World War I service ==
Hamersely was born on 6 February 1896 in Guildford, Western Australia. His father was Hugh Hamersley. Following the outbreak of World War I, Hamersley volunteered for overseas service, joining the Australian Imperial Force on 18 February 1915. Listing his occupation as a farmer, upon enlistment he was commissioned as a second lieutenant and assigned to the 16th Battalion, with whom he embarked as part of the 5th Reinforcements to leave Fremantle on board HMAT Hororata on 26 April 1915.

He fought with the battalion in the Gallipoli Campaign and suffered a bullet wound to his right thigh in August and was evacuated to Cairo. He returned to his unit in October and remained at the front until November when he contracted influenza and was evacuated to Mudros. He returned to Gallipoli just in time to participate in the evacuation and disembarked in Alexandria in January 1916. In March 1916 he was transferred to the 48th Battalion as part of the expansion of the AIF that occurred at that time. Later that month he was promoted to lieutenant and in June 1916 was transferred to France along with the rest of his battalion, to take part in the fighting in the trenches of the Western Front. In August he was temporarily seconded to the headquarters staff of the 4th Division, with the acting rank of captain.

In November 1916, he was transferred to the Royal Flying Corps and struck off the AIF's strength. After attending the 2nd Royal Flying Corps School of Instruction, he was subsequently posted to No. 60 Squadron on the Western Front to pilot a Royal Aircraft Factory SE.5a in September 1917. On the 16th, he promptly scored his first victory, destroying an Albatros D.III. On the 22nd, he shared a victory as he helped Captain Robert L. Chidlaw-Roberts become an ace by driving down an Albatros D.III out of control. The following day, Hamersley almost became Werner Voss's 49th victim; Voss shot up his SE.5a before being shot down and killed by a patrol from 56 Squadron. Hamersley survived unhurt. He continued to score; on 18 November, he scored his sixth and last win for 1917, again teaming with Chidlaw-Roberts as they destroyed a DFW reconnaissance plane.

Hamersley started again on 25 January 1918, destroying an Albatros D.V. After a couple more wins, on 30 March he destroyed an LVG recce craft and an Albatros D.V and drove down another D.V for a triple win. This rounded off his record at 10 German planes destroyed and three driven down out of control. He returned to England in May 1918 as a captain awarded a Military Cross.

== Post World War I ==
In 1920–1922, Hamersley was once again assigned to 60 Squadron, although by then it was stationed in India. He then became the Avro test pilot for a while; it was during this time that he set an altitude record in an aircraft powered by an Austin 7 motor. On 1 January 1926, he was granted a permanent commission as a Flight Lieutenant.

He was promoted to squadron leader on 1 April 1935; four months later, he was selected for an engineering assignment at RAF Worthy Down. On 1 July 1938, he was promoted to wing commander. That same year, he was named Officer Commanding of the University of London Air Squadron. He moved on to command RAF Hullavington in 1940. On 1 December 1940, Hamersley was promoted to group captain. Later, he became president of the Air Crew Selection Board in Scotland before his retirement.

== Honours and awards ==
Military Cross (MC)

Lt. (T./Capt.) Harold Alan Hamersley, R.F.C., Spec. Res. For conspicuous gallantry and devotion to duty. On one occasion whilst leading his patrol he attacked a formation of six enemy planes. In the ensuing fight he destroyed two of these machines, one falling in flames and the second crashing to earth, and during the same engagement assisted another officer in destroying a third. In addition to these he has destroyed five hostile machines and driven down three out of control. He is a magnificent pilot, displaying at all times an utter disregard of fear.
