= Richard Maybery =

British World War I flying ace (1895–1917)

Richard Aveline Maybery
- Born: 4 January 1895; Brecon, Brecknockshire, Wales
- Died: 19 December 1917 (aged 22); Haynecourt, France
- Burial place: Flesquières Hill British Cemetery, Flesquières, Nord; 50°7′30″N 3°7′30″E
- Military career
- Allegiance: United Kingdom
- Branch: British Army; Royal Air Force
- Service years: 1913–1917
- Rank: Captain
- Units: 21st (Empress of India's) Lancers; No. 56 Squadron RFC
- Conflicts: World War I • North West Frontier Province • Western Front
- Awards: Military Cross & Bar

Captain Richard Aveline Maybery MC* (4 January 1895 – 19 December 1917) was a Welsh flying ace in the First World War.

== Biography ==
Maybery was born in Brecon, Wales, on 4 January 1895, the only son of Aveline Maybery, a solicitor, and his wife Lucy. He was educated locally and at Wellington College, Berkshire, before going on to the Royal Military College, Sandhurst.

After his graduation he was commissioned as a second lieutenant in the 21st (Empress of India's) Lancers on 17 September 1913. At the outbreak of the war he was serving in the North West Frontier Province where he was promoted to lieutenant on 31 October 1914. After being seriously wounded in action at Shabqadar on 15 September 1915, Maybery became bored during his rehabilitation and, unable to sit on a horse, became involved in observing for a unit of the Royal Flying Corps who were based nearby. He was eventually seconded to the RFC, and appointed a flying officer (observer) on 10 October 1916, with seniority from 21 August 1916. Later he travelled to Egypt where he trained to be a pilot, being appointed a flying officer on 11 April 1917, and was posted to France to serve in No. 56 Squadron, alongside aces James McCudden, Arthur Rhys Davids and Keith Muspratt.

Aggressive and headstrong, Maybery quickly accumulated a high victory tally, accounting for 21 enemy aircraft between 7 July and 19 December 1917. He was awarded the Military Cross on 26 September, and on 18 November was appointed a flight commander with the temporary rank of captain. His second Military Cross was awarded on 17 December.

Moments after his final victory on 19 December, shooting down an Albatros D.V over Bourlon Wood, Maybery's SE5a was either hit by fire from a mobile anti-aircraft battery (credited to K-Flakbatterie 108 commanded by Leutnant Thiel), or shot down by Vizefeldwebel Artur Weber of Jasta 5, and crashed near the village of Haynecourt. His wartime tally consisted of 16 destroyed (two shared), and five driven down 'out of control'.

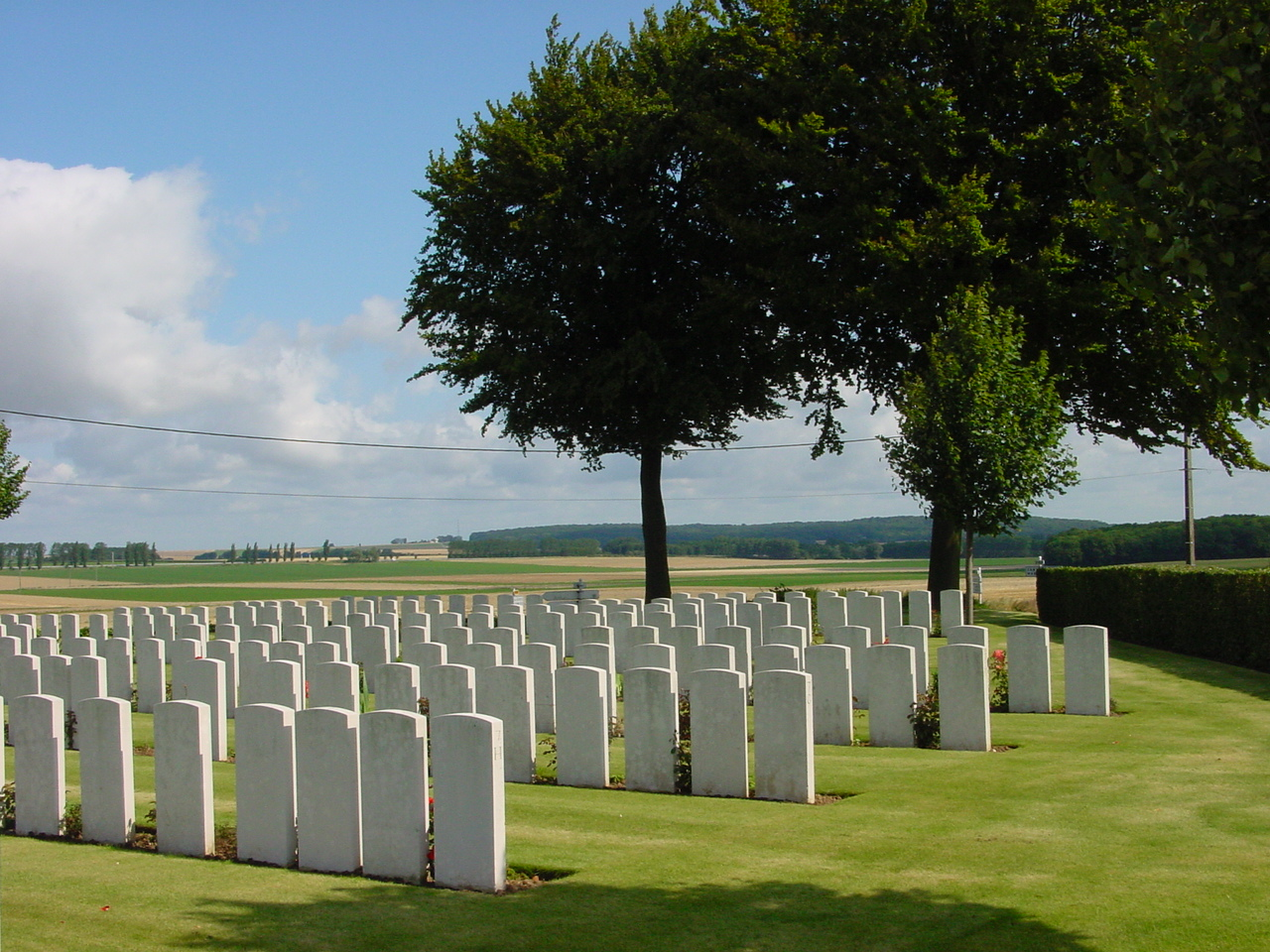
Flesquières Hill British Cemetery

Maybery was buried in Haynecourt by the Germans, but after the war was re-interred at Flesquieres Hill British Cemetery, Nord, France.

A marble plaque dedicated to the memory of Richard Aveline Maybery, can be found in Brecon Cathedral. The plaque includes the prayer:

"Almighty God..... enable us who remain in the safety of our homes to be worthy of those who have died for us... grant us with a willing spirit to do whatever duty may be laid upon us."

== Awards and citations ==
Military Cross
Lieutenant Richard Aveline Maybery, Lancers and Royal Flying Corps.

"For conspicuous gallantry and devotion to duty. After attacking two aerodromes in succession at very low altitudes, and inflicting considerable damage, he attacked and dispersed a number of mounted men and then attacked a goods train. He next attacked and shot down a hostile machine at 500 feet, and before returning attacked a passenger train. On numerous occasions he has attacked, single handed, large hostile formations and set a fine example by his gallantry and determination."

Bar to the Military Cross
Lieutenant Richard Aveline Maybery, Lancers and Royal Flying Corps

"For conspicuous gallantry and devotion to duty as leader of offensive patrols for three months, during which he personally destroyed nine enemy aeroplanes and drove down three out of control. On one occasion, having lost his patrol, he attacked a formation of eight enemy aeroplanes. One was seen to crash and two others went down, out of control, the formation being completely broken up.

== Combat record ==
List of aerial victories
| No. | Date/Time | Aircraft/ Serial No. | Foe | Result | Location | Notes |
|---|---|---|---|---|---|---|
| 1 | 7 July 1917; 0830-0915 | S.E.5a (A8934) | Albatros D.V | Driven down out of control | Henin-Liétard | |
| 2 | 12 July 1917; 2000-2030 | S.E.5a (A8934) | Albatros D.V | Destroyed | Dadizeele | |
| 3 | 16 July 1917; 1815-1915 | S.E.5a (A8934) | Albatros D.V | Driven down out of control | Polygon Wood | |
| 4 | 23 July 1917; 1945-2045 | S.E.5a (A8934) | Albatros D.V | Destroyed | Moorslede | |
| 5 | 27 July 1917; 1930-2045 | S.E.5a (A8934) | Albatros D.III | Driven down out of control | North-east of Roulers | |
| 6 | 31 July 1917; 0445-0615 | S.E.5a (A8934) | Type C | Destroyed | Wevelgem | |
| 7 | 10 August 1917; 1845-2015 | S.E.5a (B502) | Albatros D.III | Destroyed | South of Roulers | |
| 8 | 10 August 1917; 1845-2015 | S.E.5a (B502) | Albatros D.III | Destroyed | North of Houthoulst Forest | Shared with Lieutenant V. P. Cronyn |
| 9 | 22 August 1917; 1845-1930 | S.E.5a (A4859) | Albatros D.V | Destroyed | Clerkavenhoek | |
| 10 | 3 September 1917; 1845-1915 | S.E.5a (B508) | Albatros D.V | Destroyed | Houthem | Shared with Second Lieutenant Arthur Rhys-Davids |
| 11 | 5 September 1917; 1815-1915 | S.E.5a (B508) | Albatros D.V | Destroyed | Moorslede | |
| 12 | 10 September 1917; 1740-1845 | S.E.5a (B508) | Albatros D.V | Destroyed | South-east of Houthoulst Forest | |
| 13 | 10 September 1917; 1740-1845 | S.E.5a (B508) | Albatros D.V | Driven down out of control | Zonnebeke-Moorslede | |
| 14 | 30 September 1917; 1700-1800 | S.E.5a (B528) | Pfalz D.III | Destroyed | West of Roulers | |
| 15 | 2 October 1917; 1030-1145 | S.E.5a (B542) | Albatros D.III | Destroyed | Rollegem-Kapelle | |
| 16 | 28 October 1917; 0830-0855 | S.E.5a (B511) | Albatros D.V | Destroyed | Dadizeele | |
| 17 | 31 October 1917; 0855-1115 | S.E.5a (B595) | Albatros D.III | Driven down out of control | East of Ledegem | |
| 18 | 31 October 1917; 1445 | S.E.5a (B595) | Albatros D.V | Destroyed | South-west of Roulers | |
| 19 | 30 November 1917 | S.E.5a (B501) | Albatros D.V | Destroyed | Bourlon Wood | |
| 20 | 30 November 1917 | S.E.5a (B501) | Albatros D.V | Destroyed | Bourlon Wood | |
| 21 | 19 December 1917; 1250 | S.E.5a (B506) | Albatros D.V | Destroyed | Bourlon Wood | |

== Quotes ==
"...He (Captain Maybery) and Captain Ball and Lieutenant Rhys Davids did more harm to the morale of the German Flying Corps than any other fifteen pilots between them. They all, always, took on any odds. They were too brave and reckless."

— Reminiscence of Captain Duncan Grinnell-Milne, Commanding Officer of No. 56 Squadron RFC, upon hearing news of the death of Captain Richard Maybery.
