= Werner Voss =

German flying ace in WWI (1897–1917)

- Werner Voss, with the Pour le Mérite on his collar
- Born: 13 April 1897; Crefeld, Prussia, German Empire
- Died: 23 September 1917 (aged 20) near Poelcappelle, West Flanders, Belgium
- Military career
- Allegiance: German Empire
- Branch: Luftstreitkräfte
- Service years: 1914–1917 †
- Rank: Leutnant
- Units: 11th Hussar Regiment; Kampfstaffel 20; Jagdstaffel 2; Jagdstaffel 5; Jagdstaffel 10; Jagdstaffel 14; Jagdstaffel 29
- Awards: Pour le Mérite, House Order of Hohenzollern, Iron Cross 1st and 2nd Class; Pilot's Badge German Empire

Werner Voss (German: Werner Voß; 13 April 1897 – 23 September 1917) was a World War I German flying ace credited with 48 aerial victories. A dyer's son from Krefeld, he was a patriotic young man while still in school. He began his military career in November 1914 as a 17‑year‑old Hussar. After turning to aviation, he proved to be a natural pilot. After flight school and six months in a bomber unit, he joined a newly formed fighter squadron, Jagdstaffel 2 on 21 November 1916. There he befriended Manfred von Richthofen.

By 6 April 1917, Voss had scored 24 victories and awarded Germany's highest award, the Pour le Mérite. A month's leave removed Voss from the battlefield during Bloody April; in his absence, Richthofen scored 13 victories. Nevertheless, Richthofen regarded Voss as his only possible rival as top scoring ace of the war.

Soon after Voss returned from leave, he was at odds with his squadron commander. He was detailed from his squadron to evaluate new fighter aircraft and became enthusiastic about the Fokker Triplane. After transferring through three temporary squadron commands in two months, Voss was given command of Jagdstaffel 10 on 30 July 1917 at Richthofen's request. By now, his victory total was 34.

His last stand came on 23 September 1917, just hours after his 48th victory. Flying a silver-blue Fokker Dr.1, he singly fought James McCudden, Keith Muspratt, Harold A. Hamersley, Arthur Rhys-Davids, Robert L. Chidlaw-Roberts, Geoffrey Hilton Bowman, Reginald Hoidge, and Richard Maybery. After he fell in solo opposition to those eight British, Canadian and Australian aces after a dazzling display of aerobatics and gunnery that put bullets in his every opponent, he was described by his preeminent foe, Victoria Cross winner James McCudden, as "the bravest German airman". The pilot who actually killed Voss, Arthur Rhys-Davids, wished he had brought him down alive. The dogfight remains a subject of debate and controversy among aviation historians and interested parties.

== Early life and entry into military service ==
Werner Voss was born in Krefeld, Germany, on 13 April 1897. His mother, Johanna Mathilde Pastor Voss, was a pious homemaker who raised her children in the Evangelical Lutheran faith. His father Maxmilian owned a dye factory. Werner was soon followed by two brothers; Maxmilian Jr. was born in 1898, and Otto on 22 April 1901. An unusual feature of the Voss household was the presence of two first cousins, Margaret and Katherine. The elder Vosses longed for daughters, so they virtually (if not formally) adopted their nieces. The two nieces were commonly referred to within the family as "daughters" and "sisters".

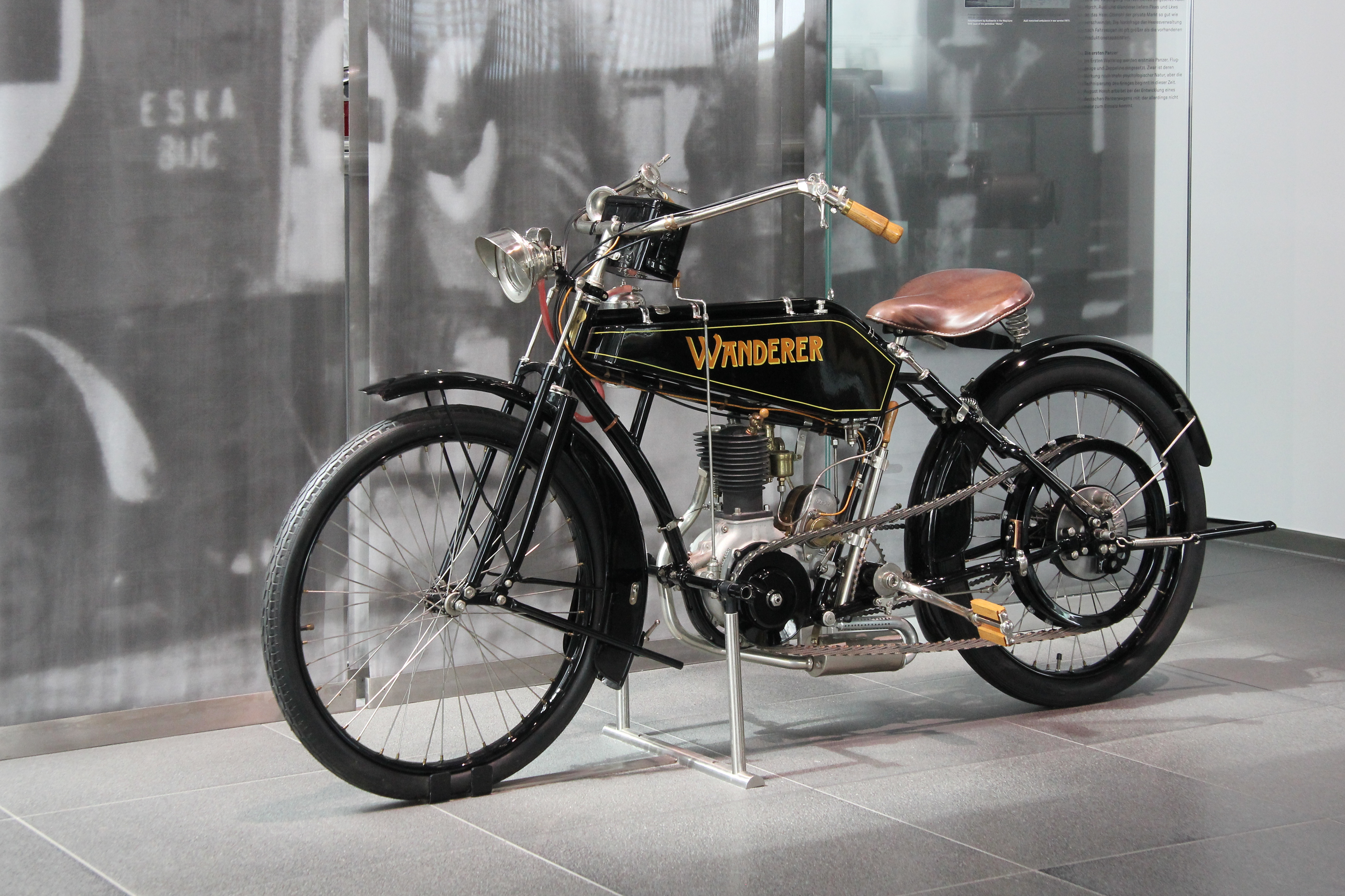
A 1914 Wanderer motorcycle

The Voss family home at 75 Blumenthalstrasse was a comfortable two-story house with surrounding grounds. Young Werner was expected to carry on the family trade as he grew into his heritage. However, even before World War I burgeoned, he was already drawn towards patriotic service. When he finished his schooling at Krefeld's Moltke Gymnasium, he joined the Krefeld Militia. In April 1914, disregarding conscription laws, the underage Werner Voss joined Ersatz Eskadron 2. His parents gave him a 300 cc (18.3 cid) Vee-twin Wanderer motorcycle for his 17th birthday. He received his "Certificate of Graduation" as a motorcyclist on 2 August 1914. After Germany entered World War I, he spent August and September 1914 as a civilian volunteer driver for the German military. The Militia Ersatz Eskadron 2 had been set up to feed recruits to Westphalia's 11th Hussar Regiment. On 16 November 1914, Werner Voss became one of those recruits despite still being only 17 years old. On 30 November, the hussar regiment was ordered to combat duty on the Eastern Front.

== Military service ==
=== From cavalry to the clouds ===
Voss was proficient in his military duties on the Eastern Front. He was promoted to Gefreiter on 27 January 1915, and raised to Unteroffizier, when barely 18 years of age, on 18 May 1915. His service earned him the Iron Cross 2nd Class. Voss reported to begin officer's training at Camp Beckstadt on 3 June 1915. There he was classified as a reservist because of his flat feet and weak ankles. He graduated on 26 July 1915.

Voss transferred to the Luftstreitkräfte (German Air Service) on 1 August 1915, joining Fliegerersatz-Abteilung 7 (Training Detachment 7) in Cologne. On 1 September, he began learning to fly at Egelsberg airfield in his hometown of Krefeld. A gifted natural pilot, Voss flew his first solo flight on 28 September. He was retained as an instructor at the training school after he graduated on 12 February 1916. On 2 March, as part of his progress towards becoming an officer, he was promoted to Vizefeldwebel (a senior noncommissioned officer). He was the youngest flight instructor in German service.

=== Aerial combat ===
See also World War I - Aerial Victory Standards

On 10 March 1916, Voss was posted to Kampfstaffel 20 (Tactical Bomber Squadron 20) of Kampfgeschwader IV (Tactical Bomber Wing IV), and served as an observer before he was allowed to fly as a pilot. In accordance with German custom, he received his pilot's badge on 28 May 1916 after flying actual combat missions. Finally commissioned as an officer on 9 September 1916, he transferred to single-seater scout aircraft and was posted to Jagdstaffel 2 (Fighter Squadron 2) on 21 November 1916.

Here Voss began a lifelong friendship with another young pilot in the squadron, Manfred von Richthofen, who would soon gain fame as the Red Baron. They would later exchange family visits while on leave, and Richthofen would host the Voss family at his squadron's airfield. The friendship grew from Voss flying as Richthofen's wingman in combat, and disregarded the disparity in their family backgrounds.

Voss, an avid motorcyclist, had a love of machinery that led him to consort with his enlisted mechanics, Karl Timms and Christian Rueser; he was even on a first name basis with them. In time, they would transfer squadrons to accompany him. Voss contravened uniform regulations at times and could often be found in the hangar working on his machine beside the mechanics, dressed in a grubby jacket without insignia. His care extended to his craft's exterior; he adorned his Albatros D.III with both a swastika and a heart for good luck. Although he was a casual dresser around his home airfield, when flying he would be well-dressed with a silk shirt beneath his aviation gear. He joked that he wanted to be presentable to the girls of Paris if he were captured. Actually, the shirt's silk collar protected his neck from chafing while he swiveled his head about watching for other aircraft during flight.

Voss scored his first aerial victory on the morning of 26 November 1916 and added a second during his afternoon flight. The two victories meant he was awarded the Iron Cross First Class on 19 December 1916. His first victory of 1917, over Captain Daly, inadvertently taught Voss the knack of deflection shooting. Voss later visited Daly while he was in hospital, twice.

Voss' score rose sharply during February and March 1917; of the 15 victories credited to his Jagdstaffel (Jasta) during March, 11 of them were shot down by him alone. For his feats, he was awarded the Knight's Cross with Swords of the Order of Hohenzollern on 17 March. The following day, Voss downed two British aircraft, doing so in a mere ten minutes. The first one burned; the second managed a crash-landing behind German lines. The second downed aircrew protested to their captors that they had supposedly been strafed at by Voss after landing.

Following his 23rd victory on 1 April, Voss strafed at both the pilot and his plane after he too had crash-landed. On 6 April 1917, he claimed to have scored another two victories 15 minutes apart. Having brought down a two-seater scout plane and a Sopwith Pup who were near one another on either side of the front lines. The two-seater pilot braved both Voss' strafing and incoming German artillery to retrieve aerial photography plates for their military intelligence value. The Sopwith Pup, though later seen with Jasta 2 in German markings after its capture, was marked as an unconfirmed victory despite landing behind German lines.

Voss was awarded the Pour le Mérite on 8 April 1917. It was customary to award a month's leave to a Pour le Mérite winner. Voss immediately left for his holiday and did not return to combat until 5 May. By the time of this leave, Voss had gained impressive marksmanship and situational awareness skills during his many hours of combat.

The timing of the holiday allowed him to spend both Easter and his birthday at home. There was a large family reunion; to the family photos, he added a formal photo, in which he is seated wearing his Pour le Mérite. He also tinkered with, and roared about upon, his motorcycle. He was out of action during Bloody April, the most intense air fighting of the war, when the Luftstreitkräfte and its aces inflicted heavy losses on the Royal Flying Corps. Richthofen, who had scored 11 victories before Voss began his own tally, achieved 13 additional victories during his absence. Referring to his "dear friend", Richthofen stated: "He was ... my most redoubtable competitor."

Upon his return from leave, Voss was dissatisfied with his commanding officer, Franz Walz, whom he considered insufficiently aggressive. Voss shared his sentiments with another Westphalian hussar, Leutnant Rolf Freiherr von Lersner. Walz had assumed command on 29 November 1916, just after Voss joined the Jasta. An older man of 31, he was a prewar pilot and professional soldier who had flown over 300 combat missions in reconnaissance two-seaters before being appointed to command this squadron of fighter pilots. Lacking a background in fighter tactics, he compensated by allowing his more experienced pilots to follow their own inclinations, including solo excursions into British territory. The fact that Walz followed two prior brilliant fighter tacticians in his command—Oswald Boelcke and Stefan Kirmaier—only exposed his weaknesses.

Voss disregarded military procedure and went outside the chain of command to petition higher headquarters for Walz's removal. Faced with such a case of insubordination, all three men were transferred out of the Jagdstaffel. Lersner was packed off to a bomber unit. Discovering the betrayal, Walz requested reassignment on the grounds that his honor had been impugned. On 20 May 1917, Flight Commander Voss was sent to Jagdstaffel 5 to assume temporary command.

=== Voss in command ===
Voss was bequeathed an Albatros D.III with the squadron's insignia. During his brief spell with Jasta 5, Voss scored a further half dozen victories. On 9 May 1917, he managed to shoot or force down three Allied aircraft, making it the first of two "hat trick" days he would have in his career. However, he was not always successful; being one of the three German fighter pilots who attacked and seriously damaged Captain Keith Caldwell of 60 Squadron on 28 May 1917, just after Voss's 31st victory, but the New Zealander escaped.

Voss was slightly wounded on 6 June 1917 by Flight Sub-Lieutenant Christopher Draper, but soon returned to duty. The Royal Naval Air Service credited Draper with an "out of control" victory; after returning to base, Voss had to trade in his damaged Albatros D.III for a fresh one. Meanwhile, Voss went on leave with Richthofen to Krefeld; surviving photographs portray them exhibiting their aircraft for Voss' relatives. Pater familias Maxmilian Voss Sr. issued an open invitation for Richthofen's use of the Voss family hunting lodge. After returning from his leave, on 28 June Voss took acting command of Jagdstaffel 29, a mere five days later he was given temporary command of Jagdstaffel 14, a posting which also didn't last long. (Note: His tenure was so fleeting, the unit histories of both Jasta 29 and Jasta 14 do not list Voss in command.)

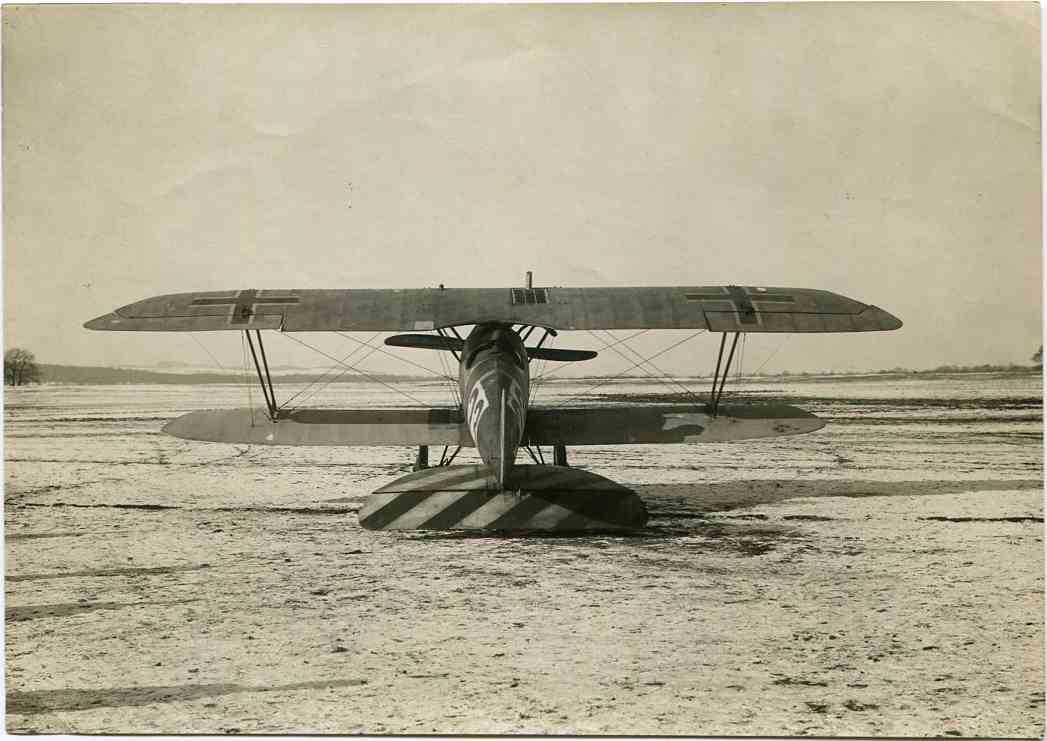
A Pfalz D.IIIa was the ace's third choice in planes.

Voss was one of the test pilots for the F.I. triplane prototype which developed into the Fokker Dr.I. He was summoned to Schwerin, and on 5 July 1917 was one of the first pilots to test fly Fokker F.I. s/n 103/17. Although the Fokker had some drawbacks, such as its low speed and slowness in a dive, Voss loved the new craft. It was easy to fly with light controls, could out-maneuver any previous aircraft, was equipped with forward-firing mounted twin machine guns and had a rapid rate of climb. The same climbing ability which put it at 1,000 meters (3,300 feet) within three minutes of takeoff lent itself well to the combat tactic of quickly rising upwards out of combat to gain the height advantage on opponents. Voss enthusiastically recommended the Fokker's adoption while never progressing to testing the Pfalz Dr.I. He left Schwerin with an assignment to command yet another fighter squadron.

On 30 July, Voss moved to his permanent command of Jagdstaffel 10 in Richthofen's Flying Circus, Jagdgeschwader I (JG I), relieving Ernst Freiherr von Althaus at Richthofen's request. A brand new silvery Pfalz D.III awaited him; Voss deemed it inferior to his green Albatros D.V, although he may have scored four victories with the Pfalz. With his mercurial "loner" personality, Voss was impatient with the paperwork and responsibilities of command. Oberleutnant Ernst Weigand managed the squadron's daily administration and relieved Voss of those chores. Voss left his staff car parked, and made his official rounds of his aerodrome on his motorcycle.

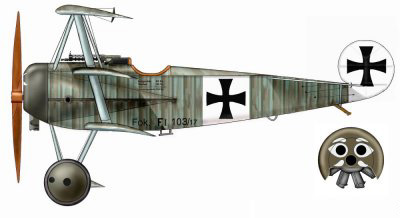
The famous Fokker Triplane of Werner Voss. The aircraft's low wing loading gave it excellent maneuverability and a high climb rate.

In late August 1917, the rotary engine F.I. prototype was assigned to Voss as his personal aircraft. In his childhood, Voss had flown Japanese fighting kites with his cousins in Krefeld; the decorations on the kites gave him the inspiration to paint the nose cowling of his triplane with two eyes, eyebrows and a moustache. The arrival of the new fighter prompted visits from celebrities. On 31 August, Anthony Fokker escorted German Chancellor Georg Michaelis and Major General Ernst von Lossberg to see and film the new triplane. On 9 September, Crown Prince Wilhelm would also visit Jagdstaffel 10.

By 11 September 1917, Voss had raised his victory total to 47, second only to the Red Baron's 61. In the process, he had his closest call yet in combat. After shooting down six-victory ace Oscar McMaking, he had in turn been attacked by Captain Norman Macmillan of No. 45 Squadron 45 RFC. Macmillan dived his Sopwith Camel within six meters (20 feet) of Voss, with machine gun rounds nearly hitting the German's head. The Scottish ace saw Voss turn his head twice to judge the Camel's position before evading. Then a Royal Aircraft Factory RE.8 blundered between them, nearly colliding with the Camel and breaking off the attack as Voss dived away. Macmillan claimed an "out of control" victory when he returned to base.

The following day, Voss signed himself out on leave on his authority as Staffelführer (squadron leader). His first stop was Berlin, where he was honored by receiving an autographed photograph of Kaiser Wilhelm II from the emperor's own hands. From the 15th to the 17th, he was at the Fokker factory in Schwerin; he was accompanied by his girlfriend Ilse. His leave authorization also cleared him for Düsseldorf and his hometown of Krefeld, but it is not known if he visited them. He returned to duty on 22 September 1917.

=== Final patrol ===
Voss returned from leave on 23 September 1917 not yet fully rested; as fellow pilot Leutnant Alois Heldmann observed: "He had the nervous instability of a cat. I think it would be fair to say he was flying on his nerves." Nevertheless, Voss flew a morning mission and shot down an Airco DH.4 from No. 57 Squadron RFC at 09:30 hours. Upon his return to his air base with bullet holes in his Fokker, he took advantage of Richthofen's absence at the Voss family hunting lodge to celebrate with a victory loop before landing. In contrast to Voss's usual tidy flying garb, he was wearing striped gray trousers, a dirty gray sweater, and tall lace-up boots.

Just before Werner landed, brothers Max and Otto Voss arrived at Jagdstaffel 10 for a visit. They were both now in the German military. Otto was a 19-year-old army leutnant bucking for an opportunity to become a flier like his elder brother. Max Jr. was a 16-year-old sergeant. Voss was fatigued and told his brothers he was looking forward to more time off. He ate lunch with his brothers—soup, black bread, coffee, and cake. His brothers noted his haggard appearance, apparent in his final photographs. After the meal, the three posed before Werner Voss's camera, which was equipped with a timed shutter release. Then Voss was scheduled for another patrol.

As the brothers were in their photo session, on the other side of the lines No. 56 Squadron RFC (Note: No. 56 squadron was an elite squadron raised to counter Richthofen's Jagdgeschwader I (someitnes called The Flying Circus).) was mustering for its own afternoon patrols. 'B' Flight was led by Captain James McCudden. In Royal Flying Corps fashion, his Royal Aircraft Factory SE5a serial number B4863 was marked with a large initial G painted upon the side of its fuselage. He would be followed by two other aces: Captain Keith Muspratt in SE5a A8944, designated H; Lieutenant Arthur Rhys-Davids in SE5a number B525, lettered I. Three other pilots were also attached to B Flight for this sortie—Lieutenants V. P. Cronyn in SE5a A4563, as well as R. W. Young, and Charles Jeffs.

Also mustering for patrol was the Squadron's 'C' Flight, led by Captain Geoffrey Hilton Bowman. His SE5a was followed by Lieutenant Reginald Hoidge in SE5a B506, lettered J. A third ace, Lieutenant Richard Maybery in SE5a B1 designated K, was also in 'C' Flight. Lieutenants E. A. Taylor and S. J. Gardiner filled out the flight's roster.

Both flights of 56 Squadron took off from their side of the trench lines at 1700 hours. They climbed into a sky overhung with a 300-meter-thick (980-foot) cloud ceiling at 2,700 meters (8,900 feet) altitude, and crossed the lines over Bixschoote at 2,400 meters (7,900 feet). McCudden later noted there were lower scattered layered skeins of clouds, but horizontal visibility was fair. On the other hand, he saw ground visibility was veiled by haze. He also noted friendly aircraft swarming to the North as his flight approached the Battle of Passchendaele. At this time there were elements of at least eight different Royal Flying Corps squadrons waging its offensive campaign over this battlefield area. There was also considerable enemy air activity to the east, where German jagdstaffeln waited for "the customers to come into the shop". The overcast conditions compressed aerial activity to lower levels instead of allowing its usual altitude range to about 6,000 meters (20,000 feet).

German anti-aircraft fire was noted as heavy and accurate, as 'B' and 'C' Flights diverged onto separate patrol routes at Houthoulst Forest. As 'B' Flight's patrol continued, McCudden swooped on a German DFW and shot it down at 18:00 hours; Rhys-Davids giving it a parting burst of machine-gun fire as it fell past him earthbound.

On the German side of the lines, Voss had changed clothing. He wore a colourful civilian silk dress shirt beneath his unbuttoned knee-length brown leather coat. His polished brown boots shone from below the coat's hem. His Pour le Mérite was at his throat. He was to lead one of the two scheduled afternoon patrols. Leutnant Gustav Bellen was his righthand wingman; Leutnant Friedrich Rüdenberg had Voss's other side. After takeoff at 18:05 hours, Voss, with his new Fokker Triplane, advanced its throttle and soon outdistanced his two wingmen flying slower Pfalz D.IIIs. A few minutes later, Oberleutnant Ernst Weigand in Albatros D.V. number 1187/17 led a second flight skyward; three Pfalz D. IIIs followed him, piloted by Leutnants Erich Löwenhardt, Alois Heldmann, and Max Kuhn. None of these Jasta 10 aircraft would ever catch up with their Staffelführer.

=== The fighting begins ===
The dogfight developed over Poelkapelle at about 18:30 hours. The Germans chasing Voss found themselves stalemated by British Sopwith Camels, as well as some SPADs and Bristol F.2 Fighters patrolling under the overcast. Two flights of the elite 56 Squadron formed a lower layer of British patrols at 1,800 meters (5,900 feet) altitude. Below that, Lieutenant Harold A. Hamersley, flying as a rear guard to his squadronmates in 60 Squadron, had a wary eye on a nearby enemy formation of 20 to 25 German aircraft. At about 18:25 hours, he turned to help what he believed to be a Nieuport threatened by a German Albatros, firing a short burst of machine-gun fire to distract the German. The "Nieuport", Voss's misidentified Fokker Triplane, rounded on Hamersley and raked him with Spandau fire. Hamersley flung his Royal Aircraft Factory SE.5a into a spin that went inverted, with Voss continuing to fire at him, holing his wings and engine cowling. Lieutenant Robert L. Chidlaw-Roberts, a squadronmate of Hamersley, rushed to his aid. Within seconds, Voss shredded Chidlaw-Roberts's rudder bar, also driving him out of the fray into a forced landing.

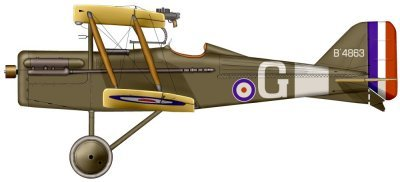
McCudden's upgraded & re-tuned SE.5a. The SE.5a's speed of 205 km/h (127 mph) made it much faster than the Fokker Triplane. McCudden retuned the engine for high altitude performance.

While they fell away seriously shot about, and the rest of 60 Squadron exited the scene, Voss was engaged by 'B' Flight of 56 Squadron, in their SE.5as. Captain McCudden and his wingmen attacked in pairs from 300 meters (980 feet) above Voss. In a pincer movement, McCudden hooked into an assault from the right while his wingman, Lieutenant Arthur Rhys Davids, swooped in from the left. Muspratt trailed them down, while Cronyn brought up the rear. Jeffs and Young held high as top-cover in case Voss climbed. Voss now found himself boxed in from above and below, with assailants pouncing from either side. To further worsen Voss's situation, there was a British fighter patrol beneath him. To the attackers' surprise, Voss did not try to escape the trap. Instead, he flicked his tri-plane about in a flat spin and fired at his attackers in a head-on firing pass, holing McCudden's wings. Voss then riddled Cronyn's SE.5 from close range, putting him out of the dogfight. Cronyn had to turn in under his attacker and throw his aircraft into a spin to escape being killed. His wing-mates then attacked Voss, while Cronyn also limped for home.

At this point 'C' Flight arrived. As it dipped down through the overcast toward the dogfight, Gardiner and Taylor went astray. Maybery was attacked by a green Pfalz D.III. Hoidge's counter-attack foiled the German. Bowman and Maybery remained to join the attack on Voss. Hoidge, having broken off his pursuit of the falling Pfalz, changed the drum magazine in his Lewis gun, and climbed to join battle.

Voss in his tri-plane zigzagged, yawed, and bobbed among his multiple attackers, never holding a straight course for more than seconds, evading British fire and spewing bullets at them all individually. The combat now became so frenetic that the surviving pilots later gave widely varying accounts. However, certain events were commonly related:

Muspratt's engine lost its coolant to a Spandau bullet early on; he glided away from the fight with the engine beginning to seize.

At some point, a red-nosed Albatros D.V. made a short-lived attempt to help Voss, but Rhys-Davids succeeded in putting a bullet through its engine and it dropped out of the fight. (Note: Until the belated discovery of Carl Menckhoff's memoirs, it was believed that he piloted this Albatros. Cite: Täger 2013, p. 186–87, 252.) At another point, Voss was caught in a crossfire by at least five of his attackers but appeared to be miraculously unaffected by the fire. At about this point, Maybery withdrew with his aircraft's upper right-hand longeron holed in several places.

Voss and the six remaining British aces swirled down to 600 meters (2,000 feet). At times Voss had altitude advantage over his attackers, but apparently did not attempt to escape the situation, despite the odds against him. Using the tri-plane's superior rate of climb and its ability to slip turn he managed to evade his opponents, and plunged down back into the melee. He continued to flick turn at high speeds and counter-attack any aircraft pursuing him. As Bowman later noted concerning his only shot at Voss: "'To my amazement he kicked on full rudder, without bank, pulled his nose up slightly, gave me a burst while he was skidding sideways and then kicked on opposite rudder before the results of this amazing stunt appeared to have any effect on the controllability of his machine." Bowman's machine was hit, left slowed and ineffectively trailing dark smoke and steam, though he stayed in the fight.

=== Death in the sky ===
Then, after flying at McCudden in a head-on machine-gun firing merge by both pilots, Voss' aircraft was suddenly struck by a starboard broadside burst of machine-gun fire from Hoidge, who was probably unsighted by Voss at that moment, and after this it was noticed that Voss stopped manoeuvring and flew level for the first time in the engagement. At this moment Rhys-Davids, who had pulled aside to change an ammunition drum, rejoined the battle with a 150-meter (490-foot) height advantage over Voss's altitude of 450 meters (1,480 feet), and began a long flat dive on to the tail of Voss' tri-plane, which failed to react. At point-blank range he raked Voss' aircraft with his machine-guns before breaking off. A few seconds on Voss's aircraft wandered into Rhys-Davids line of flight again in a strangely becalmed slow westward glide, Rhys-Davids again fired an extended burst into it causing its engine to stop, the two aircraft missing a mid-air collision by inches. As the tri-plane's glide steepened, Rhys-Davids overran him at about 300 meters (980 feet) altitude and lost sight of Voss's aircraft beneath his own. From above, Bowman saw the Fokker in what could have been a landing glide, right up until it stalled. It then flipped inverted and nose down, dropping directly to earth. The resulting smash left only the rudder intact. The White Rudder with nine bullet holes was brought back from France by Gerald Maxwell in July 1918 who presented it to Rhys-Davids's mother. In March 1920 she presented the rudder to the Imperial War Museum. It was later returned to the Rhys-David family; its current whereabouts are unknown. A yellow Fokker Triplane rudder in the IWM is not from Voss plane.

McCudden, watching from 900 meters (3,000 feet), recalled: "I saw him go into a fairly steep dive and so I continued to watch, and then saw the tri-plane hit the ground and disappear into a thousand fragments, for it seemed to me that it literally went into powder." There would be debate later whether Voss dropped out of the inverted triplane.

Voss had fought the British aces for around eight minutes, (Note: While the excited participants over-estimated the fight's duration as half an hour, a British observer overhead timed it at eight minutes.) eluding them and achieving hits on nearly every SE.5a. His stricken aircraft crashed near Plum Farm north of Frezenberg, Belgium at about 18:40 hours.

== Aftermath ==
=== British reaction ===
Lieutenant Verschoyle Phillip Cronyn later described his harrowing return flight. Being the rare targeted pilot to escape Voss's gun fire, he now had to coax home a failing machine destined for the scrapheap. He lost control of it banking for the landing pattern, and finally performed a desperate high speed landing at 18:40 hours, approximately coincidental with the triplane's impact. His Squadron commander, Major Blomfield, led the shaky-kneed pilot from his machine to a bench and plied him with medicinal brandy. Cronyn's composure broke. After a fit of weeping, he pulled himself together as McCudden landed, followed by Rhys-Davids. The latter exited his machine hyperventilating and stammering. He got his tot of brandy, and uttered an account jumbled by his excitement. With the exception of Muspratt, who had landed at the 1 Squadron aerodrome with a seized engine, the rest of 56 Squadron landed back at Estrée-Blanche. Combat reports by the pilots were written and submitted; those from McCudden, Rhys-Davids, Bowman, Maybery, Hoidge, and Gardiner still exist. These fragmentary written documents would be supplemented by McCudden's autobiography, written before his death the following year; contradictory written accounts produced by Chidlaw-Roberts and Bowman in 1942; and Cronyn's war memoirs of 1976. When corresponding with aviation historian Evan Hadingham in 1967, Cronyn offered, "... movements were purely instinctive, and made on such split second action that no impression was recorded." He offered as example that he was unaware he had spent most of his fight with Voss flying inverted until Muspratt mentioned it in the mess the evening of the fight.

The 56 Squadron mess atmosphere that night was muted, with speculation about the identity of their fallen opponent. The names Richthofen, Voss, and Wolff were suggested. Rhys-Davids was besieged with congratulations, which he received modestly with a disclaimer of, "If I only could have brought him down alive." A standing toast was drunk to their gallant fallen foe.

The following day, 24 September 1917, a British patrol reached the crash site. Documents in Voss' pocket identified him. A military doctor cursorily examined the corpse. He noted three bullet wounds. One ranged slightly upward through the chest cavity from right to left, consistent with Hoidge's angle of fire; it would have killed Voss in less than a minute. The other two gunshot wounds pierced Voss's abdomen from rear to front, coinciding with Rhys-Davids's firing angle. Werner Voss was buried like any other dead soldier near Plum Farm, laid in a shell crater without coffin or honors. His grave's location was recorded as Map Sheet 28, coordinates 24.C.8.3. The field grave would subsequently be lost trace of, through the turmoil of ongoing ground fighting.

That same day, Aide de Camp Maurice Baring was sent by Major General Hugh Trenchard to gather such military intelligence as he could about the dogfight. Baring interviewed McCudden, Maybery, Hoidge, and Rhys-Davids. McCudden laconically reported his observation of the crash location being near Zonnebeke. Maybery insisted he saw two triplanes in the fight, a grey one and a green one, in addition to a green German scout and a rednosed German scout. Hoidge never saw the rednosed Albatros. Rhys-Davids said the dogfight began when a red-nosed Albatros, a green German scout, and a grey and brown Triplane attacked an SE.5. He also insisted that the triplane mounted four guns, and thought it had a stationary engine instead of a rotary engine. Subsequent accounts of Voss's last stand would partially depend on such "facts" drawn from Baring's inquiries.

Rhys-Davids, in a letter home written on 25 September mentioning his victory claim, did not know the name of his victim. However, another letter of the 28th mentioned Voss by name. Also, on 28 September, after five days as a nonflying orderly officer, V. P. Cronyn was shipped off to another noncombat post with combat fatigue, a belated casualty.

On 1 October 1917, the British Headquarters in France and Belgium finally posted a press release to the Associated Press announcing "... Lieut. Vosse ... has been found within the British lines, and British airmen have already dropped messages behind the German front, giving notification of his death." In conformity with British Army policy, credit was given only to "... a British airman." By 5 October, Rhys-Davids's letter to his mother boasted of his souvenir rudder and compass salvaged from the triplane wreckage.

On 27 October, the same day Rhys-Davids died in action, a British intelligence officer finally gained access to the wreckage after it had lain a month in the open. He verified it was a triplane, and noted that its upper surfaces were camouflage green and its bottom surfaces were blue. Second Lieutenant Barfoot-Saunt removed some small pieces from the wreck to accompany his report, illustrating technical points. The technical information that was reported gave the British their first insight into the new craft, although Voss had swapped in a French Le Rhone engine.

=== German reaction ===
Leutnants Rüdenberg and Bellen had returned to base, as had the rest of the Jasta 10 pilots. The only one with news was Heldmann, who reported Voss headed toward British lines while pursued by a British SE.5. Timm and Rueser waited anxiously for his return as the sun set. The fact that Voss was missing in action was communicated to wing headquarters; telephone queries were made of all friendly airfields within range. Late that night, a German frontline unit reported seeing six British machines shoot down a lone German aircraft that fell within the British trenches. Heldmann refused to believe Voss was killed in aerial combat; he claimed Voss had to have been shot after crawling from the wreckage.

On 24 September, Jasta 10 pilots dropped a note inquiring about Voss attached to a black, white, and red streamer over British lines. By 25 September, two days after the fight, the Niederrheinische Volkszeitung ran a notice of Voss's death. That same day, Jasta 10 lost its second commander in three days, when Weigand was killed in action.

On 7 October 1917, the Krefelder Zeitung ran a page of tributes to Werner Voss, including those from Crown Prince Wilhelm, aviator Anthony Fokker, and Generalleutnant Ernst von Hoeppner.

On 11 October 1917, Bellen was invalided from the ranks of Jasta 10. In November, Rüdenberg was released from active duty to pursue his studies at university. Aviation historians such as Douglas Whetton posited these reassignments were retribution for failure to aid Voss in his dogfight.

== Legacy ==
When the British aces of 56 Squadron learned their fallen foe's identity, they were quick to pay public tribute to him. The leading British pilot he fought that day, James McCudden VC, expressed sincere regret at Voss' death: "His flying was wonderful, his courage magnificent and in my opinion he was the bravest German airman whom it has been my privilege to see fight."

During the Nazi regime, Voss' old school in Krefeld was renamed in his honour, but this was later reversed following the German defeat in World War II. A major thoroughfare in Krefeld is still named for him. He is also commemorated by street names in Stuttgart and in Berlin.

Still enduring is the debate as to why Voss chose to fight on against clearly almost impossible odds rather than disengage from the action. However, it is possible that he wanted to close the gap in victories between himself and the Red Baron by shooting down some British aircraft, so he stayed on. Although Voss's apparent refusal to retreat is not mentioned in the contemporary English combat reports, nor in McCudden's autobiography written in June and July 1918, McCudden is credited with the observation that Voss seemingly rejected several opportunities to disengage and withdraw from the tactically grave situation in which he found himself. In 1942 author Hector Bolitho and ace James Ira Thomas Jones received letters from both Chidlaw-Roberts and Bowman concerning their recall of Voss's last stand. Bowman read and savaged the Chidlaw-Roberts account for its inaccuracies, although his own account had obvious errors. At the same time Bowman also stated that he believed Voss had an opportunity to disengage and save himself, but had deliberately chosen instead to fight in spite of the overwhelmingly unequal situation with which he was faced. This is the earliest positively identified historical source for the assertion that Voss rejected chances for a safe retreat that were open to him. The dogfight remains a subject of debate and controversy among combat aviation historians and interested parties.

== In popular culture ==
In the 2008 biopic The Red Baron, Werner Voss is portrayed by actor Til Schweiger.

== Voss' victories ==
Confirmed victories are numbered and listed chronologically. Unconfirmed victories are denoted by "u/c".

When two casualties are listed in the Notes column, the first listed is the pilot, the other the aerial observer/gunner. Conflicting claims are denoted by *, although only one counts as a confirmed victory according to either source.

Doubled horizontal lines mark changes in squadron assignments. In his last fight Voss had nearly damaged all his opponents aircraft; they could not be credited to him as he did not survie to file any combat claims and likewise although damaged the enemy aircraft were not permanently put out action

No.	Date/time	Aircraft	Foe	Result	Location	Notes
1	27 November 1916 @ 09:40 hours	Albatros	Nieuport 17 serial number A281 from 60 Squadron	Shot down	Miraumont, France	Captain George Alec Parker missing in action
2	27 November 1916 @ 14:15 hours	Albatros	Royal Aircraft Factory FE.2b s/n 4915 from 18 Squadron	Shot down in flames	South of Bapaume, France	Lieutenant F. A. George wounded in action; Air Mechanic 1st Class Oliver Frederick Watts killed in action
3	21 December 1916 @ 11:00 hours	Albatros	Royal Aircraft Factory B.E.2d s/n 5782 from 7 Squadron	Shot down	Miraumont, France	Lieutenant D. W. Davis WIA; Second Lieutenant William Martin Vernon Cotton KIA
4	1 February 1917 @ 16:00 hours	Albatros	Airco D.H.2 s/n A2614 from 29 Squadron	Shot down	Achiet-le-Petit	Captain Albert Peter Vincent Daly WIA, prisoner of war
5	4 February 1917 @ 14:40 hours	Albatros	Royal Aircraft Factory B.E.2d s/n 5927 from 16 Squadron	Shot down	Givenchy, France	Second Lieutenant Herbert Martin-Massey WIA; Second Lieutenant Noel Mark Hodson Vernham KIA
6	10 February 1917 @ 11:15 hours	Albatros	Airco D.H.2 s/n A2548 from 32 Squadron	Damaged	Southwest of Serre	Captain Leslie Peech Aizlewood returned to base unhurt
7	25 February 1917 @ 14:55 hours	Albatros	Airco D.H.2 s/n A2557 from 29 Squadron	Shot down	Arras-Saint Sauveur	Lieutenant Reginald J. S. Lund WIA
8	25 February 1917 @ 15:00 hours	Albatros	Airco D.H.2 s/n 7849 from 29 Squadron	Damaged	Arras, France	Captain H. J. Payn's returned to base unhurt
9	26 February 1917 @ 16:50 hours	Halberstadt	Royal Aircraft Factory B.E.2c s/n 2535 from 16 Squadron	Shot down	Écurie, France	Lieutenant H. E. Bagot WIA; Second Lieutenant Robert Lawrence Munro Jack died of wounds
10	27 February 1917 @ 10:45 hours	Albatros	Royal Aircraft Factory B.E.2e s/n 2530 from 8 Squadron	Shot down in flames	Blairville, France	Second Lieutenants Edwin Albert Pope and Hubert Alfred Johnson KIA
11	27 February 1917 @ 16:48 hours	Albatros	Royal Aircraft Factory B.E.2c s/n 7197 from 12 Squadron	Shot down	West of Arras	Captain John McArthur and Private James Whiteford KIA
12	4 March 1917 @ 11:30 hours	Albatros	Royal Aircraft Factory B.E.2d s/n 6252 from 8 Squadron	Shot down in flames	South of Berneville, France	Sergeant Reginald James Moody and Second Lieutenant Edmund Eric Horn KIA
13	6 March 1917 @ 16:35 hours	Albatros	Airco D.H.2 s/n 7941 from 32 Squadron	Shot down	Favreuil, France	Captain Herbert Gordon Southon WIA, POW
14	11 March 1917 @ 10:00 hours	Albatros	Royal Aircraft Factory F.E.2b s/n 7685 from 22 Squadron	Shot down	Rancourt, France	Second Lieutenant Leslie W. Beale and Air Mechanic 2nd Class F. G. Davis WIA
15	11 March 1917 @ 14:30 hours	Albatros	Nieuport 17 s/n A279 from 60 Squadron	Shot down	Bailleul, France	Arthur D. Whitehead WIA, POW
16	17 March 1917 @ 12:15 hours	Albatros	Royal Aircraft Factory F.E.2b s/n 7695 from 11 Squadron	Shot down	Northeast of Berlencourt-le-Cauroy, France	Second Lieutenant Russell W. Cross and Lieutenant Christopher F. Lodge WIA
17	17 March 1917 @ 12:25 hours	Albatros	Airco D.H.2 s/n A2583 from 32 Squadron	Shot down	Northeast of Berlencourt-le-Cauroy	Lieutenant Theodore A. Cooch WIA
18	18 March 1917 @ 18:40 hours	Albatros	Royal Aircraft Factory B.E.2e s/n 5784 from 8 Squadron	Shot down in flames	Neuville, France	Second Lieutenant Charles R. Dougal WIA; Second Lieutenant Sydney Harryman POW/WIA/DOW
19	18 March 1917 @ 18:50 hours	Albatros	Royal Aircraft Factory B.E.2d s/n 5750 from 13 Squadron	Shot down; aircrew and aircraft strafed on ground	Boyelles, France	Captain Guy Stafford Thorne DOW; Second Lieutenant Philip Edward Hislop van Baerle POW
20	19 March 1917 @ 09:30 hours	Albatros	Royal Aircraft Factory R.E.8 s/n A4165 from 59 Squadron	Shot down	Saint-Léger, France	Captain Eldred Wolferstan Bowyer-Bower and Second Lieutenant Eric Elgey KIA
21	24 March 1917 @ 16:10 hours	Albatros	Royal Aircraft Factory F.E.2b s/n A5485 from 23 Squadron	Shot down	Between Vaulx and Morchies	Sergeant Edward P. Critchley WIA; Air Mechanic 1st Class Frank Russell KIA
22	24 March 1917 @ 16:45 hours	Albatros	Royal Aircraft Factory B.E.2d s/n 5769 from 8 Squadron	Shot down	Boileux-Boiry	Lieutenant Hugh Norton and Second Lieutenant Reginald Alfred William Tillett KIA
23	1 April 1917 @ 11:45 hours	Albatros	Royal Aircraft Factory B.E.2c s/n 2561 from 15 Squadron	Shot down; aircraft strafed on ground	East of Saint-Léger, France	Captain Arthur Meredith Wynne WIA; Lieutenant Adrian Somerset MacKenzie KIA
24	6 April 1917 @ 09:30 hours	Albatros	Royal Aircraft Factory B.E.2c s/n A3157 from 15 Squadron	Shot down	South of Lagnicourt-Marcel, France	Second Lieutenants Albert Higgs Vinson and Everard Champion Gwilt crashlanded within British lines
u/c	6 April 1917 @ 09:45 hours	Albatros	Sopwith Pup s/n A6165 from 54 Squadron	Forced to land	South of Lagnicourt-Marcel, France	Second Lieutenant Robert M. Foster survived
25	7 May 1917 @ 19:25 hours	Albatros	Royal Aircraft Factory SE.5 s/n A4867 from 56 Squadron	Shot down	Between Étaing and Lecuse	Second Lieutenant Roger Michael Chaworth-Musters KIA
26	9 May 1917 @ 14:00 hours	Albatros	Royal Aircraft Factory B.E.2c s/n 7209 from 52 Squadron	Exploded	Havrincourt, France	Lieutenant Roland Humphrey Coles and Second Lieutenant John Charles Sigismund Day KIA
27	9 May 1917 @ 16:45 hours	Albatros	Sopwith Pup s/n A6174 from 54 Squadron	Shot down	Lesdain, France	Lieutenant George Copland Temple Hadrill POW
28	9 May 1917 @ 16:50 hours	Albatros	Royal Aircraft Factory F.E.2b s/n 4991 from 22 Squadron	Shot down	Le Bosquet	Second Lieutenants Charles McKenzie Furlonger and Charles William Lane POW
29	23 May 1917 @ 14:25 hours	Albatros D.III	Royal Aircraft Factory F.E.2b s/n A5502 from 18 Squadron	Shot down	North of Havrincourt	Second Lieutenant Wilfred Ferguson MacDonald and Lieutenant Frank Charles Shackell KIA
30	26 May 1917 @ 15:45 hours	Albatros D.III	Sopwith Pup s/n A6168 From 54 Squadron	Shot down	Southwest of Gouzeaucourt, France	Second Lieutenant Mortimer George Cole WIA
31	28 May 1917 @ 14:00 hours	Albatros D.III	Royal Aircraft Factory F.E.2d s/n A6378 from 25 Squadron	Shot down	Southeast of Douai, France	Captain Aubrey de Selincourt and Lieutenant Henry Cotton POW
32	4 June 1917 @ 07:10 hours	Albatros D.III	Sopwith Pup s/n B2151 from 54 Squadron	Shot down	Aubencheul-aux-Bois, France	Captain Reginald George Hewett Pixley KIA
33	5 June 1917 @ 09:30 hours	Albatros D.III	Royal Aircraft Factory F.E.2b s/n A857 from 22 Squadron	Shot down	North of Vaucelles	Captain Francis Percival Don and Lieutenant Herbert Harris POW
34	6 June 1917 @ 13:10 hours	Albatros D.III	Nieuport 17 s/n N3204 from 6 Naval Squadron	Shot down	West of Graincourt-lès-Havrincourt, France	Sub-Lieutenant Fabian Pember Reeves of the RNAS KIA
35	10 August 1917 @ 16:25 hours	Albatros D.III	Spad XIII from Escadrille 31 of the Aéronautique Militaire	Shot down	South of Diksmuide, Belgium	Captain Henri Rousseau MIA
36	15 August 1917 @ 19:10 hours	Albatros D.III	Royal Aircraft Factory F.E.2b s/n A5152 from 20 Squadron	Shot down	Zillebeke Lake	Second Lieutenant Charles H. Cameron unhurt; Private Stanley Edward Pilbrow KIA
37	16 August 1917 @ 21:00 hours	Albatros D.III	Sopwith Camel s/n B3756 from 70 Squadron	Disappeared	St. Julien	Captain Noel William Ward Webb MIA
38	23 August 1917 @ 10:10 hours	Albatros D.III	Spad VII s/n B3528 from 19 Squadron	Crashlanded at 23 Squadron's airfield	Southwest of Diksmuide, Belgium	Captain Arthur Lionel Gordon-Kidd WIA/DOW
39	3 September 1917 @ 09:52 hours	Fokker Triplane s/n 103/17	Sopwith Camel s/n 3917 from 45 Squadron	Shot down	North of Houthem	Lieutenant Aubrey Talley Heywood KIA
40*	5 September 1917 @ 14:50 hours	Fokker Triplane s/n 103/17	Sopwith Pup s/n B1842 from 46 Squadron	Crashlanded trailing blue smoke	St. Julien	Second Lieutenant Charles Walter Odell unharmed
40*	5 September 1917 @ 15:50 hours	Fokker Triplane s/n 103/17	Airco DH.5 s/n A9374 from 32 Squadron	Crashed into Ypres Canal	St. Julien	Lieutenant William Edwin Sandys KIA
41	5 September 1917 @ 16:30 hours	Fokker Triplane s/n 103/17	Caudron two-seater s/n G.6 from Escadrille 53	Shot down	Bixschoote	Maréchal des logis Jacques Thabaud-Desthouilieres and Lieutenant Marcel Mulard KIA
42	6 September 1917 @ 16:35 hours	Fokker Triplane s/n 103/17	Royal Aircraft Factory F.E.2d s/n B1895 from 20 Squadron	Shot down in flames	Saint Julien/Boesinghe	Lieutenant John Oscar Pilkington and Air Mechanic 2nd Class Herbert Frederick Matthews KIA
43	10 September 1917 @ 17:50 hours	Fokker Triplane s/n 103/17	Sopwith Camel s/n B3927 from 70 Squadron	Shot down	Between Passendale and Langemarck	Second Lieutenant Arthur Jackson Smith Sisley KIA
44	10 September 1917 @ 17:55 hours	Fokker Triplane s/n 103/17	Sopwith Camel s/n B3787 from 70 Squadron	Shot down	Between Passendale and Langemarck	2nd Lt Oliver Charles Pearson MIA
45	10 September 1917 @ 18:15 hours	Fokker Triplane s/n 103/17	Spad VII from Escadrille 31	Shot down	Paschendaele-Westroosebeke	Adjutant Jules Tiberghein KIA
46	11 September 1917 @ 10:30 hours	Fokker Triplane s/n 103/17	Bristol F.2 Fighter s/n B1105 from 22 Squadron	Shot down	Langemarck	Second Lieutenant R. de Lacey Stedman WIA; Second Lieutenant Harry Edward Jones KIA
47	11 September 1917 @ 16:25 hours	Fokker Triplane s/n 103/17	Sopwith Camel B6236 from 45 Squadron	Shot down	East of Saint Julien	Lieutenant Oscar Lennox McMaking KIA
48	23 September 1917 @ 09:30 hours	Fokker Triplane s/n 103/17	Airco D.H.4 s/n A7643 from 57 Squadron	Shot down in flames	Ledegem, Belgium	Second Lieutenants Samuel Leslie John Bramley and John Matthew Delacey KIA
