= Geoffrey Hilton Bowman =

British WW1 fighter ace (1891–1970)

- Born: 2 May 1891; Manchester, Lancashire
- Died: 25 March 1970 (aged 78)
- Military career
- Allegiance: United Kingdom
- Branch: British Army; Royal Air Force
- Service years: 1914–1934; 1939–1941
- Rank: Group Captain
- Nickname: Beery
- Units: 3rd Battalion, Royal Warwickshire Regiment; No. 29 Squadron RFC; No. 56 Squadron RFC
- Commands: No. 41 Squadron RAF; No. 3 Squadron, Slavo-British Aviation Corps; No. 8 Squadron RAF; No. 1 Armament Training Camp, RAF Catfoss; RAF South Farnborough
- Conflicts: World War I World War II
- Awards: Distinguished Service Order; Military Cross & Bar; Distinguished Flying Cross; Croix de guerre (Belgium)
- Other work: Director of Heston Aircraft Co.

Group Captain Geoffrey Hilton "Beery" Bowman, DSO, MC & Bar, DFC (2 May 1891 – 25 March 1970) was an English First World War fighter ace credited with 32 victories. After attaining the rank of major in the Royal Flying Corps, he later became a group captain in the Royal Air Force.

== Early life ==
Bowman was born in Manchester, England, the son of George Bowman, a physician, and his wife Mary. He was educated at Haileybury College and Trinity College, Cambridge.

== First World War ==
Having served in the Officers' Training Corps, Bowman was commissioned as a probationary second lieutenant in the 3rd (Reserve) Battalion, Royal Warwickshire Regiment on 15 August 1914. After serving with his regiment in France, on 20 March 1916 Bowman was seconded to the Royal Flying Corps (RFC). He was awarded the Royal Aero Club's Aviator's Certificate No. 7977 on 27 June, and was appointed a flying officer in the RFC two days later.

Bowman joined No. 29 Squadron on 7 July 1916, based at Abeele, flying the Airco DH.2. His first victory was against a Roland C.II two seater, with which he unintentionally collided on 3 September; he turned into its attack, firing away, and the German plane tore away his aileron kingpost. Bowman "babied" his crippled craft home despite its lack of lateral control. His second victory, on 27 September, was a run-away German observation balloon which he downed after finding it drifting over the lines; however he crashed while trying to land alongside the balloon wreckage on Mount Kemmel.

On 1 January 1917 he was appointed a flight commander with the temporary rank of captain, receiving promotion to the permanent rank of captain on 1 April 1917. On 11 May he was posted to No. 56 Squadron as a flight commander, flying S.E.5. By July he had claimed another five victories. On 23 September Bowman was one of the eight British aces who fought and shot down German ace Werner Voss. Bowman was awarded the Military Cross on 14 September, and a bar on 26 October. On 9 February 1918 he was posted to command of No. 41 Squadron.

Awarded the Distinguished Service Order in March 1918, his final tally at the end of the war in November was one aircraft shared captured, one balloon destroyed, 15 aircraft destroyed and 15 driven 'out of control'. He was awarded the Distinguished Flying Cross on 30 May 1919, and the Croix de guerre from Belgium in July 1919.

== Inter-war career ==
In February 1919 Bowman completed the Naval Co-operation Course at RAF Calshot. On 7 June he was appointed acting-major, and served as the commander of No. 3 Squadron, Slavo-British Aviation Corps, an Anglo-Russian unit based around Arkhangelsk, fighting for the White Russians during the Russian Civil War. Bowman relinquished his Army commission on being granted a Permanent Commission in the Royal Air Force on 1 August 1919, with the rank of flight lieutenant.

Bowman served in India in 1920, and was promoted to squadron leader on 1 January 1921. He served in the RAF Coastal Area, and as a supernumerary at the RAF Depot (Inland Area), before attending the Central Flying School for a flying refresher course before embarking for overseas service on 16 January 1922. He served as the Commanding Officer of No. 8 Squadron in Iraq from 1922 to 1924. He then served on the staff at No. 5 Flying Training School, RAF Sealand, in 1925, and from December 1925 attended the Staff College, Quetta, and then served at Headquarters RAF India until 1928.

On 21 January 1928 he returned to No. 8 Squadron as Commanding Officer, based in Aden, and on 15 March 1929 his name was brought to notice by Group Captain William Mitchell, commander of British Forces in Aden, for his "distinguished services rendered in connection with the operations in the Protectorate of Aden during the period June to August 1928". He was promoted to wing commander on 1 January 1929.

On 9 August 1929 Bowman was assigned to Headquarters, Inland Area, for Air Staff duties. In June 1931 he competed in a race at the annual Hendon Air Show, flying an Armstrong Whitworth Siskin.

Bowman served as the Commanding Officer of No. 1 Armament Training Camp at RAF Catfoss, Yorkshire, from 1 March 1932, and on 15 November was assigned to the Experimental Section at the Royal Aircraft Establishment, Farnborough, for flying duties. He married Pamela Ward of Marden Hill, Hertfordshire, on 5 December. From 16 October 1933 he was Commanding Officer of RAF South Farnborough, home of the Royal Aircraft Establishment, the School of Photography, and No 4 (Army Co-operation) Squadron.

On 6 August 1934 Bowman was assigned to No. 27 Group Headquarters at RAF Grantham for Air Staff duties. Finally, on 20 January 1937, Bowman was placed on the retired list at his own request.

== World War II and later life ==
Bowman was recalled for active service on 1 September 1939, and served until 15 December 1941 before retiring for a second time. He served on the board of the Heston Aircraft Company in the 1940 and 1950s.

Group Captain Bowman died on 25 March 1970. His funeral was held at Southwest Middlesex Crematorium, Hanworth, Middlesex, on 2 April, and a memorial service held at St Clement Danes, Aldwych, on 17 April.

== Awards and citations ==
Military Cross

Lieutenant (Temporary Captain) Geoffrey Hilton Bowman, Royal Warwickshire Regiment (Special Reserve), and Royal Flying Corps.

For conspicuous gallantry and devotion to duty. He has taken part in many offensive patrols, which he led on twenty occasions, in the course of which four enemy aircraft were destroyed and twelve others driven down out of control. Although outnumbered by five to one on one occasion he handled his patrol of four machines with such skill and gallantry that after a very severe fight he was able to withdraw them without loss, having destroyed at least two enemy machines and driven down one out of control. His fearlessness and fine offensive spirit have been a splendid example to others.

Bar to the Military Cross

Lieutenant (Temporary Captain) Geoffrey Hilton Bowman, MC, Royal Warwickshire Regiment (Special Reserve), and Royal Flying Corps.

For conspicuous gallantry and devotion to duty in leading twenty-five offensive patrols in two months, shooting down five enemy aircraft and showing marked skill as a leader.

Distinguished Service Order

Lieutenant (Temporary Captain) Geoffrey Hilton Bowman, MC, Royal Warwickshire Regiment (Special Reserve), and Royal Flying Corps.

For conspicuous gallantry and devotion to duty. He has recently destroyed six enemy aeroplanes and driven down others out of control. He has at all times shown splendid courage and determination, and by his leadership and good example has contributed largely to the success of his squadron.

== Bibliography ==
- Shores, Christopher F.; Franks, Norman; Guest, Russell (1990). Above the Trenches: A Complete Record of the Fighter Aces and Units of the British Empire Air Forces 1915–1920. London, UK: Grub Street. ISBN 0-948817-19-4.
- Guttman, Jon; Dempsey, Harry (2009). Pusher Aces of World War I. Osprey Publishing. ISBN 978-1-84603-417-6.
