= La Herlière =

- Commune
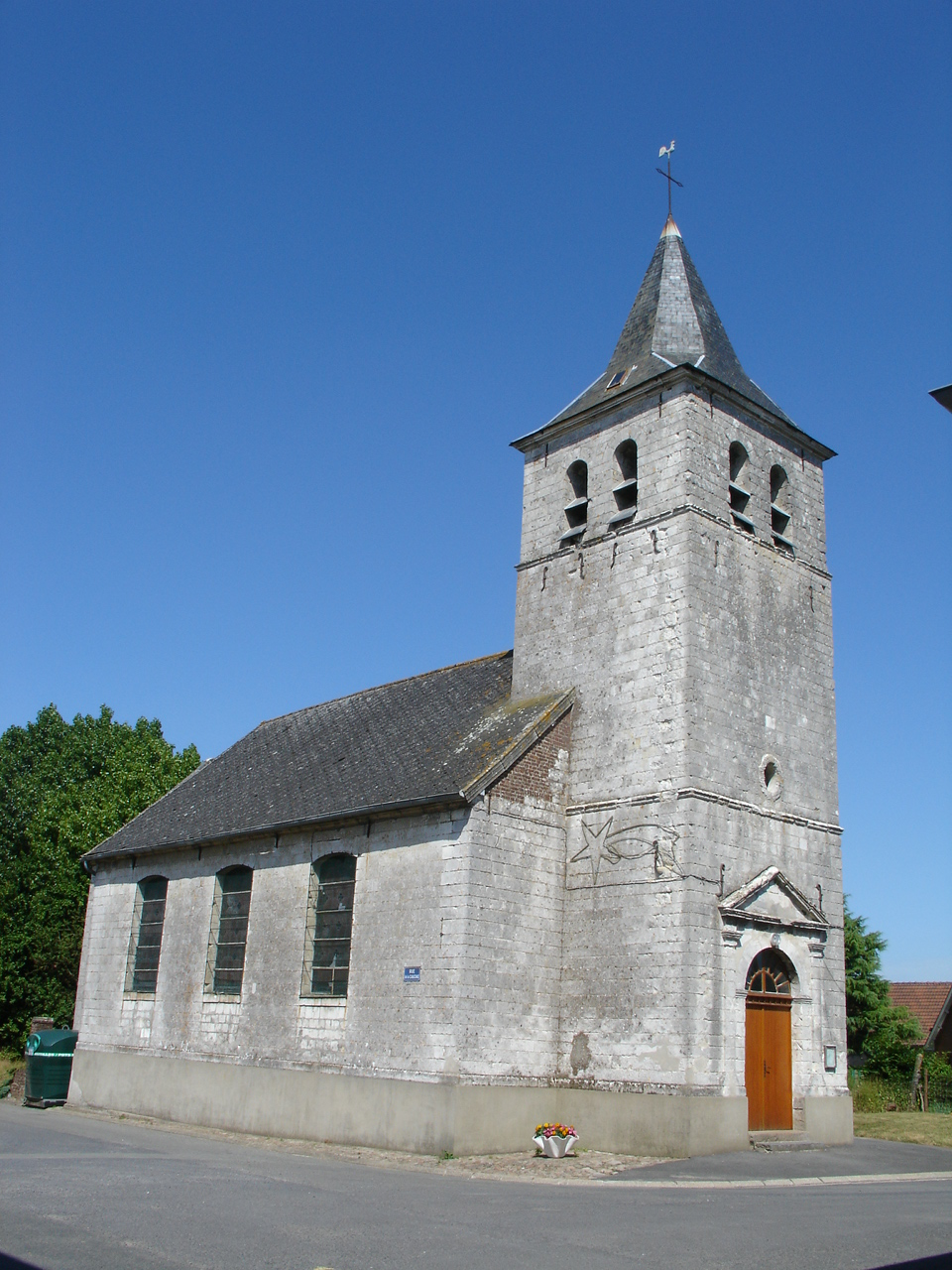
- The church of La Herlière

- Coat of arms
- Location of La Herlière
- Location within France Location within Hauts-de-France
- Coordinates: 50°12′32″N 2°33′36″E
- Country: France
- Region: Hauts-de-France
- Department: Pas-de-Calais
- Arrondissement: Arras
- Canton: Avesnes-le-Comte
- Intercommunality: CC Campagnes de l'Artois

Government
  - Mayor (2020–2026): Alain Traisnel
- Area^{1}: 5.4 km^{2} (2.1 sq mi)
- Elevation: 171 m (561 ft)
- Highest elevation: 178 m (584 ft)
- Lowest elevation: 142 m (466 ft)
- Population (2023): 135
  - Density: 25/km^{2} (65/sq mi)
- Time zone: UTC+01:00 (CET)
  - Summer (DST): UTC+02:00 (CEST)
- INSEE/Postal code: 62434 /62158
- ^{1} French Land Register data, which excludes lakes, ponds, glaciers > 1 km^{2} (0.386 sq mi or 247 acres) and river estuaries.

La Herlière (French pronunciation: [la ɛʁljɛʁ]) is a commune in the Pas-de-Calais department in the Hauts-de-France region of France.

== Geography ==
A small farming village situated 13 miles (21 km) southwest of Arras, at the junction of the D26 and the N25 road.

== Population ==
Historical population
Year	Pop.	±% p.a.
1968	137	—
1975	121	−1.76%
1982	124	+0.35%
1990	135	+1.07%
1999	127	−0.68%
2007	152	+2.27%
2012	165	+1.65%
2017	149	−2.02%
2023	135	−1.63%
Source: INSEE

== Places of interest ==
- The church of St.Jean, dating from the twentieth century.

== See also ==
- Communes of the Pas-de-Calais department
