= Slip-turn =

Type of aircraft manoeuvre

A slip-turn is a maneuver in which an aircraft turns using only the rudder. In most aircraft, the presence of a fixed vertical stabilizer complicates the maneuver. However, in those in which the whole of the vertical stabilizer comprises the rudder, such as the Fokker Dr.I triplane, the aircraft can be made to effectively skid in the horizontal plane, a technique employed by the German World War I ace Josef Jacobs to great effect, and which Werner Voss used in his final combat.
