= Robert L. Chidlaw-Roberts =

Welsh World War I flying ace

Robert Leslie Chidlaw-Roberts
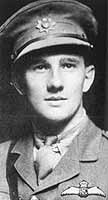
- Born: 9 May 1896; Tywyn, Merionethshire, Wales
- Died: 1 June 1989 (aged 93); Winchester, Hampshire, England
- Military career
- Allegiance: United Kingdom
- Branch: British Army; Royal Air Force
- Service years: 1915–1920; 1942–1954
- Rank: Flight Lieutenant
- Units: Hampshire Regiment; No. 2 Squadron RFC; No. 18 Squadron RFC; No. 40 Squadron RFC; No. 60 Squadron RFC/RAF
- Conflicts: World War I World War II
- Awards: Military Cross; Air Force Cross

Flight Lieutenant Robert Leslie Chidlaw-Roberts MC AFC (9 May 1896 – 1 June 1989) was a Welsh World War I flying ace credited with ten aerial victories. During his aerial combat career, and in different dogfights, he engaged two famous German aces, he was one of the British pilots who downed Werner Voss, and on 9 January 1918, he shot down and killed Max Ritter von Müller.

He also served in the Royal Air Force during and after World War II.

== Biography ==
=== Early life ===
Robert Leslie Chidlaw-Roberts was born in Tywyn, Merionethshire on 9 May 1896 to John Chidlaw-Roberts (1859–1910) and his wife Matilda Eleanor (1867–1951). His mother was a daughter of noted Welsh antiquary John Pughe (Ioan ab Hu Feddyg, 1814–74).

=== World War I ===
Chidlaw-Roberts attended the Royal Military College, Sandhurst, and from there was commissioned as a second lieutenant in the Hampshire Regiment on 16 June 1915. He was seconded to the Royal Flying Corps on 21 October 1915, as a flying officer (observer). His first aerial duty was six months spent as an observer/gunner with No. 2 Squadron RFC. He then underwent pilot training, receiving the Royal Aero Club Aviator's Certificate No. 2527 on 23 January 1916, and on 21 April 1916 he was appointed a flying officer.

Chidlaw-Roberts served in No. 18 Squadron RFC from 18 May to 4 December 1916 as a Royal Aircraft Factory FE.2b pilot; During this stretch, he also received promotion to the temporary rank of lieutenant on 1 September 1916.

He then transferred to No. 60 Squadron RFC in August 1917. He was one of the combatants who engaged Werner Voss in the German ace's last stand on 23 September 1917. Later, on 9 January 1918, he shot down and killed a German ace with 36 victories, Max Ritter von Müller. Shortly after this, he was rotated to England for a rest, and was assigned to No. 28 Training Squadron.

Chidlaw-Roberts was awarded the Military Cross on 1 February 1918. In Summer 1918, he returned to the front as the flight commander of A Flight, No. 40 Squadron RAF.

=== Between the wars ===
Chidlaw-Roberts was one of the RAF pilots who served in Russia in 1919.

In January 1920 Flight Lieutenant Chidlaw-Roberts relinquished his temporary RAF commission and was restored to the establishment of the Hampshire Regiment with the rank of lieutenant, but on 23 March 1920 Chidlaw-Roberts left the Hampshire Regiment, and was assigned to the General Reserve of Officers as a lieutenant with seniority from 3 July 1916.

=== World War II ===
Chidlaw-Roberts returned to active duty on 12 May 1942 when he was commissioned as a pilot officer (emergency) in the General Duties Branch of the Royal Air Force Volunteer Reserve. On 1 September 1944 Flight Lieutenant Chidlaw-Roberts was awarded the Air Force Cross.

He remained in the RAF post-war, and on 1 November 1947 was granted the substantive rank of flying officer, with seniority from 12 May 1943. He relinquished his war substantive rank of flight lieutenant on 1 January 1948, and finally relinquished his commission on 10 February 1954.

== Honours and awards ==
Military Cross
Lieutenant (Temporary Captain) Robert Leslie Chidlaw-Roberts, Hampshire Regiment and Royal Flying Corps.
For conspicuous gallantry and devotion to duty. He constantly attacked superior numbers of enemy aeroplanes. On one occasion he repeatedly attacked five enemy machines, driving among them and attacking each in turn at short ranges. On three other occasions he brought down enemy machines. He showed great skill and courage.
