= Mary Cecilia Foley =

British geologist and university administrator (1859–1925)

- Born: 8 October 1859; Wadhurst, Sussex, United Kingdom
- Died: 22 October 1925 (aged 66)
- Education: University College, London B.Sc (1891)
- Parents: John Foley (father); Caroline Elizabeth Windham (mother)
- Relatives: Caroline Rhys Davids (sister)
- Scientific career
- Workplaces: University of London

Mary Cecilia Foley (8 October 1859 – 22 October 1925) was a British geologist who worked at the University of London.

== Early life and education ==
Foley was born at Wadhurst, Sussex in October 1859. She was the daughter of John Foley, vicar of Wadhurst, and Caroline Elizabeth Foley (née Windham), and had an older sister, Caroline Rhys Davids and a brother Charles Windham Foley. Four years before she was born, five of her siblings died from diphtheria within weeks of each other between December 1855 and January 1856. They are commemorated in the church of St Peter and St Paul, Wadhurst.

Foley studied at University College, London under geologist Thomas George Bonney. She graduated in 1891 with an honours degree in geology and was awarded the Morris prize for geology that same year. Foley was active in improving women's welfare through social work and advancement in politics.

Foley is known for her contribution to the understanding of geology with her discovery of dark green glass in volcanic lava located at Bertrich.

== Geologists' Association ==
During the 1890s, Foley was an active member of the Geologists' Association, which is an inclusive professional organization that welcomes geologists of all backgrounds. Foley also published a number of reports of field excursions, and in 1896, she published a paper on 'enclosures of glass in basalt', based on field observations of some volcanic outcrops in the Eifel.

She served on the council of the Geologists' Association from 1897 to 1900, and from 1909 to 1912. Foley was only the second woman, after Catherine Raisin, to be elected to serve on the council. From 1901 to 1903, Foley was excursions secretary for the association.

From 1901 to 1925 Foley was the Chief Lady Invigilator at London University.

During the 1900s, Foley assisted her sister Caroline Rhys Davids with the transcription of two Buddhist texts in the Pali language: the Dukapaṭṭhāna (1906) and the Yamaka (1911).
