= Keith Muspratt =

Irish air force captain

Keith Knox Muspratt MC
- Born: 22 December 1897; Bournemouth, Hampshire, England
- Died: 16 March 1918 (aged 20); Martlesham Heath, Suffolk, England
- Burial place: Bournemouth Cemetery, Wimborne Road, Hampshire; 50°44′00″N 1°52′25″W
- Military career
- Allegiance: United Kingdom
- Branch: British Army
- Service years: 1916–1918
- Rank: Captain
- Units: Dorsetshire Regiment; No. 56 Squadron RFC
- Conflicts: First World War
- Awards: Military Cross

Captain Keith Knox Muspratt MC (22 December 1897 – 16 March 1918) was an English First World War flying ace in the Royal Flying Corps with eight victories to his name.

== Biography ==
=== Early life and background ===
Keith Muspratt was born in Bournemouth, Hampshire, the youngest of three sons of Charles Drummond Muspratt, MD (1859–1927), a surgeon, and his wife Mabel, the daughter of the Right Honourable Sir H. Knox. His older brother Captain Terence Petty Muspratt, MC, of the Worcestershire Regiment, was killed in action on 29 May 1918, aged 22, and is buried at Terlincthun British Cemetery, Wimille, France.

Muspratt was educated at Wychwood School in Bournemouth, and in 1911, aged 14, was sent to Sherborne School, Dorset. There he was a school prefect, played football for his house, and was commissioned as a cadet officer in the Junior Division of the Officers' Training Corps. Muspratt began to learn to fly while still at school, mainly during the holidays, attending the Ruffy-Baumann School of Flying at Hendon Aerodrome from mid-1915. He was awarded his Royal Aero Club Aviator's Certificate (No. 2789) on 27 April 1916.

=== Military service ===
Muspratt left school at the end of the 1916 summer term, and was commissioned as a temporary second lieutenant in the Dorsetshire Regiment for service in the Royal Flying Corps on 8 August 1916. On 2 November he was appointed a flying officer.

Muspratt first served as a flying instructor and in a testing squadron, before joining No. 56 Squadron in France in May 1917. During his service, he was credited with eight aerial victories (one captured, four destroyed, and three (two shared) 'out of control'). His first claim was flying Sopwith-built SE.5 No. A4861, against an Albatros D.III that he helped to force down out of control on 24 May 1917. He added a second out-of-control victory on the 28th while flying SE.5 No. A8913. On 17 July, he shared another out-of-control victory flying A8913.

He switched to SE.5 No. 8944, and scored decisively three times in August. Then, on 23 September, he participated in one of the epic air battles of World War I when Werner Voss single-handedly fought patrols from No. 60 Squadron, and "B" Flight of No. 56 Squadron, included Muspratt. During the battle, Voss damaged two No. 60 squadron aircraft such that they withdrew from the fight. He also holed the radiator of Muspratt's aircraft and riddled the wings of another 56 Squadron aircraft. Voss finally succumbed to bullets from Arthur Rhys Davids.

Muspratt was awarded the Military Cross on 18 October 1917, and destroyed two more German aircraft by the end of the month. After his final victory, he was withdrawn from battle and assigned to Home Establishment to serve as a test pilot at Martlesham Heath.

Muspratt was promoted to lieutenant on 8 February 1918, and appointed a flight commander with the acting rank of captain on 11 February. He was killed in a flying accident in Suffolk on 16 March 1918, and is buried at Bournemouth Cemetery on Wimborne Road.

== Awards and citation ==
Military Cross
Temporary Second Lieutenant Keith Knox Muspratt, General List and Royal Flying Corps.

"For conspicuous gallantry and devotion to duty. He showed great initiative throughout the offensive operations, and seldom failed to become engaged with enemy aircraft when on offensive patrol. He destroyed several hostile machines. He took part in over forty offensive patrols, the majority of which entailed very severe fighting at low altitudes under heavy fire, and he set a magnificent example by his skill, gallantry, and initiative."
