= Relative wind =

In aeronautics, the relative wind is the direction of movement of the atmosphere relative to an aircraft or an airfoil. It is opposite to the direction of movement of the aircraft or airfoil relative to the atmosphere. Close to any point on the surface of an aircraft or airfoil, the air is moving parallel to the surface; but at a great distance from the aircraft or airfoil, the movement of the air can be represented by a single vector. This vector is the relative wind or the free stream velocity vector.

The angle between the chord line of an airfoil and the relative wind defines the angle of attack. The relative wind is of great importance to pilots because exceeding the critical angle of attack will result in a stall, regardless of airspeed.

== In freefall ==
Relative wind is also used to describe the airflow relative to an object in freefall through an atmosphere, such as that of a person's body during the freefall portion of a skydive or BASE jump. In a normal skydive, the vertical descent of the skydiver creates an upward relative wind. The relative wind strength increases with increased descent rate.

The relative wind is directly opposite the direction of travel.

When a skydiver exits a forward-moving aircraft such as an aeroplane, the relative wind emanates from the direction the aeroplane is facing due to the skydiver's initial forward (horizontal) momentum. As aerodynamic drag gradually overcomes this forward momentum and gravity simultaneously attracts the skydiver downward, the relative wind alters proportionally into an upward (vertical) direction. This creates an arc of travel for the skydiver similar to water flowing from a low pressure hose held horizontally and creates a variation in the angle of the relative wind from horizontal to vertical.

When exiting from a forward-moving aircraft (as distinguished from a hovering aircraft, such as a balloon or a helicopter in hover mode) during a normal belly-to-earth skydive, the skydiver must arch his body in the direction of travel which is initially horizontal. If the skydiver continues to arch, his belly will gradually alter pitch until he is belly-to-earth. This section of the jump is commonly referred to as "the hill".

Relative wind differs from the wind in meteorology in that the object (e.g.., the skydiver) moves past the air, as opposed to the air moving past the object.
