= Reginald Hoidge =

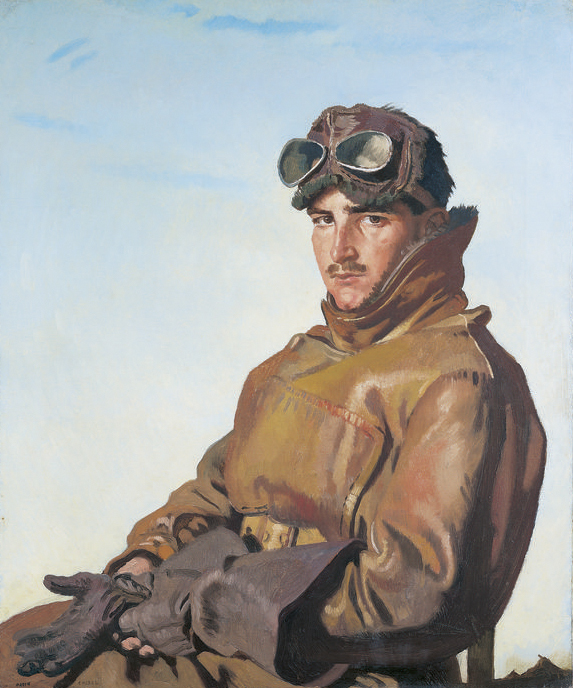
- Lieut R. T. C. Hoidge (William Orpen, 1917)
- Born: 28 July 1894; Toronto, Ontario, Canada
- Died: 1 March 1963 (aged 68); New York City, New York, United States
- Military career
- Allegiance: Canada c. 1914–1916; United Kingdom 1916–1920
- Branch: Canadian Army; British Army; Royal Air Force (attached)
- Rank: First Lieutenant (held temporary rank as Captain for a short period)
- Nickname: Georgie
- Units: Canadian Royal Garrison Artillery; Royal Flying Corps: No. 1 Squadron RFC; No. 56 Squadron RFC
- Conflicts: First World War
- Awards: Military Cross & Bar

Reginald Theodore Carlos Hoidge MC & Bar (28 July 1894 – 1 March 1963) was a Canadian First World War flying ace, officially credited with 28 victories. He served initially in the Canadian Royal Garrison Artillery before transferring to the British Army to be attached to the Royal Flying Corps, and then the new Royal Air Force on its creation in 1918.

== Early life ==
Hoidge was born in Toronto, Ontario, Canada. He was the son of John R. and Lovida Hoidge. He originally served with the Canadian Royal Garrison Artillery.

== Aerial service in combat ==
Hoidge transferred to the British Army, taking a commission in the (British) Royal Garrison Artillery (Special Reserve), and was attached to the Royal Flying Corps, as a second lieutenant on 15 November 1916. He was posted to No. 56 Squadron to fly a Royal Aircraft Factory SE 5 fighter in 1917. He flew this aircraft for all his victories.

His first victory was over an Albatros D.III on 5 May 1917. He sent it down out of control over Montigny, France. The first of three victories on 24 May made him an ace. In an evening hour's roving battle, he sent an Albatros D.II down out of control for score number five, set another German plane on fire for number six, and finished up the day by driving down another D.III as victim seven.

He was promoted to temporary lieutenant on 1 June 1917, and later confirmed in that rank from 11 July 1917. He was awarded the Military Cross on 18 July, the citation read:

2nd Lt. Reginald Theodore Carlos Hoidge, R.G.A. (Spec. Res.) and R.F.C. For conspicuous gallantry and devotion. On many occasions he has attacked and destroyed or driven down hostile machines, and has taken part in twenty-four offensive patrols. In all combats his bravery and skill have been most marked.

On 22 August, he was appointed a flight commander, with the rank of temporary captain.

Hoidge continued downing enemy aircraft until 31 October 1917, when his total stood at 27. During this stretch of success, his most memorable battle was one in which he did not score. He was one of the seven aces involved in Werner Voss's last stand on 23 September, when Voss in his Fokker F.I fought all the British fliers to a standstill, damaging all the attacking SE 5s. Hoidge's final total included 23 successes over enemy fighters and only five over opposing two-seater reconnaissance planes. His 28-claim tally comprised eight destroyed (including a shared victory), and 20 'out of control' victories (including two shared).

== Later life ==
Hoidge was returned to England for a year's duty as an instructor. He was awarded a Bar to his MC on 18 March 1918, the citation read:

2nd Lt. (T. /Lt.) Reginald Theodore Carlos Hoidge, M.C., R.G.A., Spec. Res. and R.F.C. For conspicuous gallantry and devotion to duty in shooting down fourteen enemy aircraft in three and a half months. After attacking a large formation of enemy aircraft, owing to engine trouble he was driven down to six hundred feet at least five miles from our lines, but managed to recross the lines at a height of five hundred feet, and so saved his machine.

He returned to the front as a flight commander in his old unit and scored a final victory on 29 October 1918. He relinquished his commission on 1 April 1920, and was permitted to retain the rank of lieutenant. He died in New York City on 1 March 1963.
