= John Sharpe Griffith =

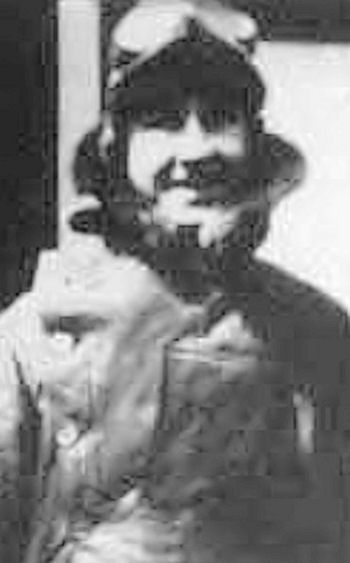
- John Sharpe Griffith, 1918
- Born: November 26, 1898; Seattle, Washington US
- Died: October 14, 1974 (aged 75); Riverhead, New York, US
- Military career
- Allegiance: United States
- Branch: British Army; Royal Air Force
- Service years: 1917–1921
- Rank: Lieutenant
- Unit: No. 60 Squadron RFC/RAF
- Conflicts: World War I; Western Front; Russian Civil War; World War II
- Awards: Distinguished Flying Cross & Bar; Order of Saint Vladimir (Russia)
- Other work: Served as colonel in USAAF in World War II

Lieutenant (later Colonel) John Sharpe Griffith, DFC* (November 26, 1898 – October 14, 1974) was an American World War I flying ace credited with seven aerial victories while serving in the British Royal Flying Corps and Royal Air Force, also serving during the Allied intervention in the Russian Civil War. He returned to service during World War II in the United States Army Air Forces, and finally retired in 1956.

== Early life ==
Griffith was born in Seattle, Washington, the son of C. E. Griffith, and was educated at Broadway High School.

== World War I ==
In July 1917, Griffith travelled to Vancouver where he enlisted into Royal Flying Corps Canada, learning to fly in Toronto before travelling to England in November. He was posted to No. 60 Squadron RFC in February 1918 to fly a S.E.5a single-seat fighter. Between 9 March and 7 July 1918, he destroyed five enemy aircraft, including one each shared with Art Duncan and George Hegarty. On 18 July, he was shot down by anti-aircraft fire, his wounds ending his participation in the war.

== Post-war ==
In 1919, while serving as part of the North Russian Expeditionary Force, Griffith flew 40 patrols in northern Russia against the Bolsheviks, shooting down one of their observation balloons. He finally left the Royal Air Force in 1921.

== Honours and awards ==
Distinguished Flying Cross
Lieutenant John Sharpe Griffith.

"During the last few months this officer has destroyed three enemy aeroplanes and assisted in bringing down a fourth; he has, in addition, driven down two balloons and shot down two machines out of control. Whilst leading his patrol at 11,000 ft. altitude he observed three enemy aeroplanes at 2,000 ft.; he immediately dived and led his patrol to the attack, destroying two of the machines, one of which he accounted for himself. A gallant and determined officer."

Bar to Distinguished Flying Cross
Flying Officer John Sharpe Griffith, DFC.

Between the 5th May and 24 July 1919, this officer carried out forty bomb raids and reconnaissances, all with great success and generally from a low altitude. On the 3rd June, 1919, he dived to within 100 feet of the ground and destroyed an enemy balloon, as well as several of its attendants. When a two-seater machine was not readily available he fitted a camera to his scout, and, although, it is very difficult to take photographs from such machines (and, moreover, he was inexperienced in such work); he succeeded in taking a very good mosaic which proved of great utility to the Commander of the Vologda Force. Flying Officer Griffith is an intrepid pilot and a very skilful all-round officer.

== List of aerial victories ==
Combat record
No.	Date/Time	Aircraft/ Serial No.	Opponent	Result	Location	Notes
1	9 March 1918 @ 1110	S.E.5a (C5385)	Albatros D.V	Out of control	North of Menin	
2	18 March 1918 @ 1250	S.E.5a (C1069)	Albatros D.V	Out of control	Roulers	
3	30 March 1918 @ 1150	S.E.5a (C1069)	LVG C	Destroyed	Bécourt	
4	6 May 1918 @ 1115	S.E.5a (D3503)	Albatros D.V	Destroyed	Guillaucourt	Shared with Lieutenant William Duncan.
5	16 May 1918 @ 0845	S.E.5a (D3503)	LVG C	Destroyed	Fampoux	Shared with Lieutenant Herbert Hegarty.
6	1 July 1918 @ 0845	S.E.5a (D3503)	Albatros D.V	Destroyed	Lamotte	
7	7 July 1918 @ 1140	S.E.5a (D5992)	DFW C	Destroyed	Achiet-le-Grand	

== See also ==
- List of World War I flying aces from the United States
