= Alexander Beck =

Alexander Beck may refer to:

- Alexander Beck (aviator) (1899–1989), Anglo-Argentine World War I flying ace
- Alexander Beck (athlete) (born 1992), Australian sprinter
- Alexander Bek (1903–1972), Soviet novelist and writer
