= Robert Kenneth Whitney =

- Born: 6 December 1898; Abbotsford, Quebec
- Died: 1983 (aged 84–85)
- Military career
- Allegiance: Canada; United Kingdom
- Branch: Royal Flying Corps; Royal Air Force
- Rank: Lieutenant
- Unit: No. 60 Squadron RAF
- Awards: Distinguished Flying Cross

Robert Kenneth Whitney DFC (6 December 1898 - 1983) was a Canadian First World War flying ace, officially credited with 5 victories.

Whitney joined 60 Squadron on 21 February 1918; they were equipped with Royal Aircraft Factory SE.5as. He did not win until 7 July, when he set a DFW reconnaissance afire. He destroyed another on the 18th. On 8 August, he scored a double victory, destroying a Hannover reconnaissance plane (a shared win with John Doyle), and flaming another DFW, whose crew parachuted to safety. Whitney's last victory, tallied the following day, was the destruction of another Hannover; this was another triumph shared with Doyle.
