= Herbert George Hegarty =

Irish World War I flying ace

- Born: 31 October 1885; Clonbur, County Galway, Ireland
- Died: 1953 (aged 67–68); Somerset, England
- Military career
- Allegiance: United Kingdom
- Branch: British Army; Royal Air Force
- Service years: 1911–1919
- Rank: Captain
- Units: Hong Kong Artillery and Rifle Volunteer Corps; No. 60 Squadron RFC/RAF
- Conflicts: World War I; Western Front
- Awards: Military Cross
- Other work: Banker

Captain Herbert George Hegarty MC (31 October 1885 – 1953) was an Irish World War I flying ace credited with eight aerial victories.

== Early life and education ==
Hegarty was born in Clonbur, County Galway, and was educated at Portora Royal School, Enniskillen. He then gained a position at the Hongkong and Shanghai Bank, based in Hong Kong. He also served as a second lieutenant in the Hong Kong Artillery and Rifle Volunteer Corps from October 1911.

== World War I ==
In 1917 Hegarty travelled from Hong Kong to England via North America. He was commissioned as a second lieutenant (on probation) to serve in the Royal Flying Corps on 8 June, and was posted to No. 5 and No. 28 Training Squadrons between July and September, being confirmed in his rank on 8 September.

In November 1917 Hegarty was posted to No. 60 Squadron RFC based at Sainte-Marie-Cappel, France, to fly a S.E.5a single-seat fighter. He gained his first aerial victory on 28 January 1918, driving down out of control an Albatros D.V fighter over Kortemark. On 4 February he shared in the shooting down in flames of another D.V over Zonnebeke, and destroyed two more on 18 and 30 March. On 14 May he destroyed an Albatros two-seater to gain his fifth victory and ace status. Early on 16 May 1918 he shared in the destruction of an LVG two-seater over Fampoux with American ace Lieutenant John Griffith, and later that day was recommended for the Military Cross, which cited his six confirmed victories and mentions several other unconfirmed ones. His award was gazetted on 13 September, the citation reading:

Second Lieutenant Herbert George Hegarty, RAF.

"For conspicuous gallantry and devotion to duty on offensive patrols. During recent operations he destroyed four enemy machines and drove down two. He is a bold and fearless pilot, and has done splendid work."

Hegarty was appointed a flight commander with the temporary rank of captain on 13 June, and gained two more aerial victories on 30 June and 1 July. He was posted to the Home Establishment on 15 July 1918 to serve as an instructor at the No. 4 Fighting School at RAF Freiston, Lincolnshire. Hegarty was transferred to the RAF's unemployed list on 6 February 1919.

== List of aerial victories ==
Combat record
| No. | Date/Time | Aircraft/ Serial No. | Opponent | Result | Location | Notes |
|---|---|---|---|---|---|---|
| 1 | 28 January 1918 @ 1320 | S.E.5a (B626) | Albatros D.V | Out of control | Kortemark, Belgium | |
| 2 | 4 February 1918 @ 1125 | S.E.5a (B626) | Albatros D.V | Destroyed in flames | Zonnebeke, Belgium | Shared with Lieutenant H. D. Crompton. |
| 3 | 18 February 1918 @ 1230 | S.E.5a (C9536) | Albatros D.V | Out of control | Staden, Belgium | |
| 4 | 30 March 1918 @ 1110 | S.E.5a (C5381) | Albatros D.V | Destroyed | South of Albert, France | |
| 5 | 14 May 1918 @ 0730 | S.E.5a (B190) | Albatros C | Destroyed | Moreuil, France | |
| 6 | 16 May 1918 @ 0845 | S.E.5a (B190) | LVG C | Destroyed | Fampoux, France | Shared with Lieutenant John Griffith. |
| 7 | 30 June 1918 @ 0510 | S.E.5a (D5992) | Albatros D.V | Destroyed | Rainecourt, France | |
| 8 | 1 July 1918 @ 0840 | S.E.5a (D5992) | Halberstadt C | Destroyed | Bray, France | |
