= Alfred William Saunders =

Irish flying ace

- Born: 16 January 1888; Dublin, Ireland
- Died: 22 May 1930 (aged 42); Te Awamutu, Waikato, New Zealand
- Burial place: Te Awamutu Cemetery, Waikato, New Zealand
- Military career
- Allegiance: United Kingdom
- Branch: British Army; Royal Air Force
- Service years: 1915–1927
- Rank: Captain
- Units: Royal Field Artillery; No. 60 Squadron RAF
- Conflicts: World War I • Gallipoli campaign • Western Front
- Awards: Distinguished Flying Cross

Captain Alfred William Saunders DFC (16 January 1888 – 22 May 1930) was an Irish flying ace of the First World War, credited with twelve aerial victories. He remained in the RAF post-war, serving until 1927.

== Early life and background ==
Saunders was born in Dublin, the son of Matthew J. Saunders, of County Wicklow.

== World War I ==
Saunders was commissioned as a second lieutenant (on probation) in the Royal Field Artillery on 24 May 1915, serving in the Gallipoli campaign before being confirmed in his rank on 9 February 1916. He then transferred to the Royal Flying Corps, receiving Royal Aero Club Aviator's Certificate No. 3283 after soloing a Maurice Farman biplane at Military School, Catterick Bridge, on 20 July 1916, and was appointed a flying officer on 25 August.

On 1 July 1917 he was promoted to lieutenant in the Royal Field Artillery, but had to wait until 1 September until receiving the same step in the RFC. The following month he was posted to No. 60 Squadron in France to fly the S.E.5a single-seat fighter.

Saunders did not gain his first aerial victory until 10 May 1918, destroying a German Pfalz D.III fighter aircraft. Six days later, an Albatros D.V fell to his guns over Beaulencourt, France. On 23 May, he shared with Captain James Belgrave in the destruction of another Albatros D.V over Fricourt. On 9 June, the two men accounted for two Hannover reconnaissance aircraft over Arras, setting one afire and driving the other down out of control, and Saunders was an ace.

On 2 July 1918, Saunders fought his memorable action–one which would be cited as a reason for awarding him the DFC. He dived 8,000 feet, leading an attack by his flight of six upon six German fighters. Saunders shot one Pfalz D.III down, and two others collided while evading his assault. Saunders was credited for all three.

On 29 July, he was appointed a flight commander with the temporary rank of captain, taking command of "A" Flight. On 1 August, Saunders vanquished one of the new Fokker D.VIIs, sending it out of control over Bapaume. A week later, it was the turn of a German reconnaissance two-seater to fall out of control over Chaulnes. The next day, 9 August 1918, Saunders shot down two Fokker D.VIIs.

On 3 August 1918, he was awarded the Distinguished Flying Cross. His citation read:

Lieutenant Alfred William Saunders.

"A gallant and determined officer whose fighting spirit and enthusiasm has been a splendid example to his squadron. On one occasion whilst leading his formation of six machines, he attacked six enemy aeroplanes. Diving from 11,000 to 3,000 feet, he singled out a group of three, and shot down one. He then engaged the other two, which in their endeavour to get away collided and crashed."

=== List of aerial victories ===
Combat record
No.	Date/Time	Aircraft/ Serial No.	Opponent	Result	Location	Notes
1	10 May 1918 @ 1735	S.E.5a (C5450)	Pfalz D.III	Destroyed	Bapaume—Péronne	
2	16 May 1918 @ 1615	S.E.5a (C5450)	Albatros D.V	Destroyed	Beaulencourt	
3	23 May 1918 @ 0550	S.E.5a (B137)	Albatros D.V	Destroyed	Fricourt	Shared with Captain James Belgrave.
4	9 June 1918 @ 1045–1050	S.E.5a (B137)	Hannover C	Destroyed in flames	Arras	Shared with Captain James Belgrave.
5	9 June 1918 @ 1045–1050	S.E.5a (B137)	Hannover C	Out of control	Arras	Shared with Captain James Belgrave.
6	2 July 1918 @ 1045–1050	S.E.5a (E1279)	Pfalz D.III	Destroyed	Villers-Bretonneux	
7	2 July 1918 @ 1045–1050	S.E.5a (E1279)	Pfalz D.III	Destroyed	Bois de Pierret	
8	2 July 1918 @ 1045–1050	S.E.5a (E1279)	Pfalz D.III	Destroyed	Bois de Pierret	
9	1 August 1918 @ 2020	S.E.5a (E3916)	Fokker D.VII	Out of control	Bapaume	
10	8 August 1918 @ 1315	S.E.5a (E3916)	C	Out of control	Chaulnes	
11	9 August 1918 @ 1545–1547	S.E.5a (E3916)	Fokker D.VII	Destroyed	Chaulnes	
12	9 August 1918 @ 1545–1547	S.E.5a (E3916)	Fokker D.VII	Destroyed	Nesle	

== Post-war career ==
Saunders was transferred to the RAF's unemployed list on 31 October 1919, but was granted a short service commission with the rank of flying officer on 12 December. He eventually relinquished his commission in the Royal Field Artillery on 1 April 1920. On 5 February 1923, he was transferred to the Reserve of Air Force Officers (Class "A"). On 16 December 1924, he then transferred to the "Class C" Reserves. On 5 February 1927, he relinquished his commission upon completion of service.

On 22 May 1930 Saunders was giving passenger flights in Te Awamutu, New Zealand, when his de Havilland Gipsy Moth went into a tail spin and crashed, killing his passenger instantly, while Saunders died from his injuries later.
