= Richard Lee (RAF officer) =

British flying ace of WWII

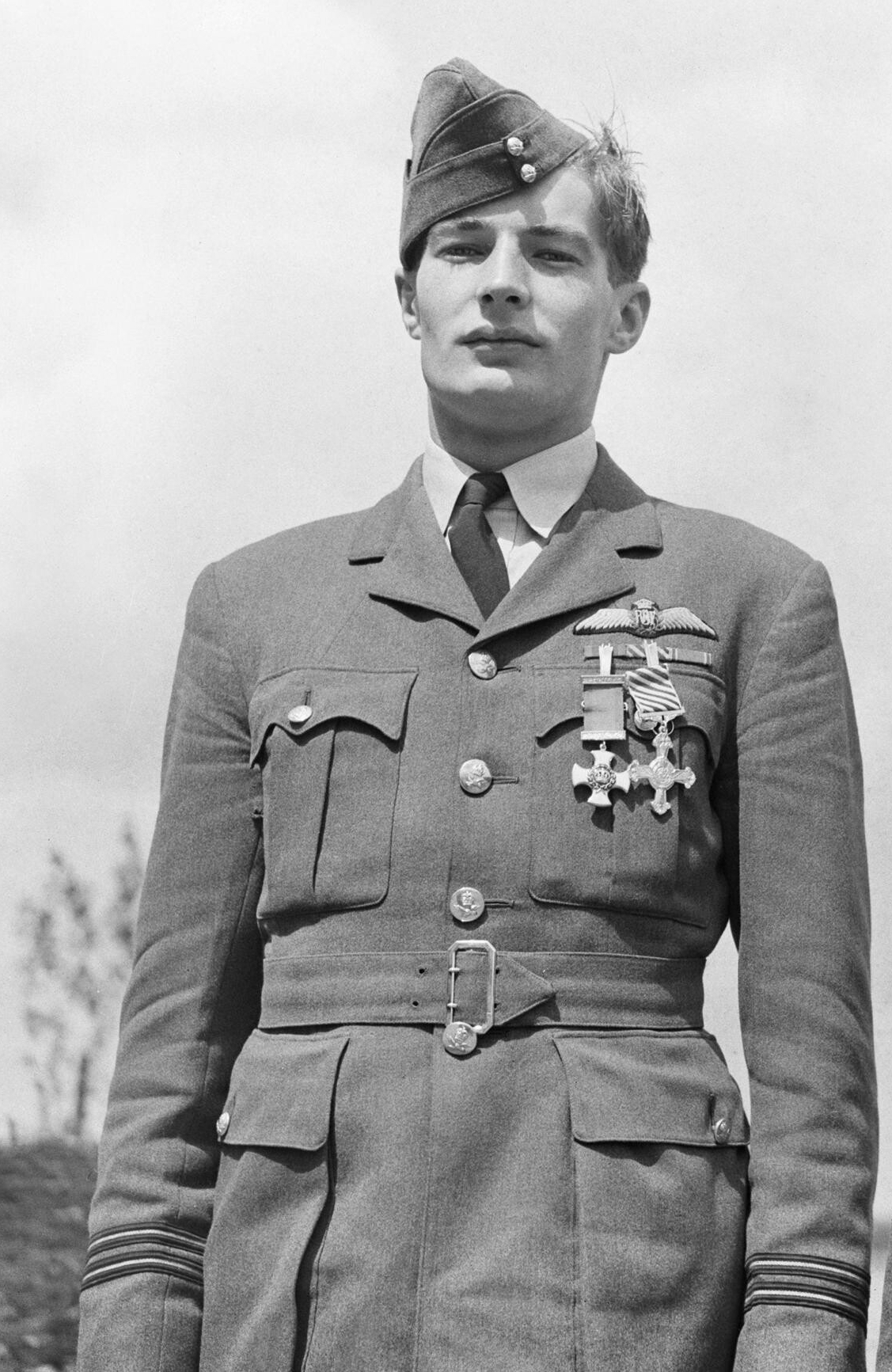
- Lee after being presented with his Distinguished Service Order and Distinguished Flying Cross, 27 June 1940
- Born: 12 May 1917; Mayfair, London, England
- Died: 18 August 1940 (MIA); North Sea
- Military career
- Allegiance: United Kingdom
- Branch: Royal Air Force
- Service years: 1935–1940
- Rank: Flight Lieutenant
- Nickname: 'Dickie'
- Unit: No. 85 Squadron
- Conflicts: Second World War: Battle of France; Battle of Britain
- Awards: Distinguished Service Order; Distinguished Flying Cross; Mention in Despatches

Richard Lee, DSO, DFC (12 May 1917 – 18 August 1940) was a British flying ace of the Royal Air Force (RAF) during the Second World War. He is credited with the destruction of at least nine aircraft.

From Mayfair, London, Lee joined the RAF as a flight cadet in September 1935. After completing his flying training, he was posted to No. 85 Squadron and was sent to France with this unit on the outbreak of the Second World War. He achieved his first aerial victory on 21 November 1939, the first of the war for a pilot of the squadron and he was subsequently awarded the Distinguished Flying Cross. Further aerial victories were claimed during the opening stages of the Battle of France the following year. Once the squadron's campaign in France was over, he transferred to No. 56 Squadron and flew in operations covering the British evacuation from Dunkirk. Awarded the Distinguished Service Order, he returned to No. 85 Squadron for the Battle of Britain. He went missing in action on 18 August 1940.

== Early life ==
Richard Hugh Antony Lee, known as 'Dickie', was born on 12 May 1917 in Mayfair, London, in England, to Lieutenant Colonel Charles Frederick Lee and his wife Alice. Lee's father was adjutant to Major General Hugh Trenchard, the commander of the Royal Flying Corps and who became Richard's godfather. He was educated at Charterhouse School and then in September 1935 took up study at the Royal Air Force College at Cranwell as a flight cadet. Upon graduation in July 1937, he was posted to No. 87 Squadron as a pilot officer.

This was a newly reformed unit which was based at Debden and equipped with Gloster Gladiator fighters. In June the following year Lee's flight was the basis for the formation of No. 85 Squadron, also based at Debden. A few months later it began to reequip with the Hawker Hurricane fighter. In January 1939, Lee was promoted to flying officer. At some stage in the late 1930s, Lee performed flying stunts for a George Formby film.

== Second World War ==
On the outbreak of the Second World War, No. 85 Squadron was sent to France as part of the Air Component of the British Expeditionary Force (BEF). It flew patrols and was occasionally called upon to intercept intruding Luftwaffe aircraft from its bases in Lille-Seclin and Merville. On 21 November 1939 Lee, by now an acting flight lieutenant, destroyed a Heinkel He 111 medium bomber, which crashed into the sea to the north of Cap Gris-Nez. This was the squadron's first aerial victory of the Second World War. Lee was subsequently awarded the Distinguished Flying Cross (DFC), the announcement being made on 8 March 1940.

=== Battle of France ===
Despite Lee's success of 21 November, No. 85 Squadron otherwise saw little action until 10 May 1940, when the Battle of France, the German invasion, commenced. The squadron was immediately and frequently engaged. That day Lee flew several patrols, the first early in the morning when the squadron was scrambled as nearby Lille was bombed. During the course of the day, he damaged a Junkers Ju 88 medium bomber, shared in the destruction of a second Ju 88, and shot down a Henschel Hs 126 reconnaissance aircraft. However, he was slightly wounded in the leg. The next day Lee put in claims for the destruction of one Dornier Do 17 medium bomber and a share in a second but on his last sortie of the day was shot down over Belgium. He was captured but was able to escape and acquire civilian attire and make it back to the Allied lines on 13 May. He promptly returned to operations and over the next few days, claimed six He 111s as destroyed although there are no details available for these.

In need of a rest, Lee, along with other senior pilots of No. 85 Squadron, was repatriated to England on 17 May. However two days later he was posted to No. 56 Squadron. With this unit, which was based at North Weald and equipped with Hurricanes, he flew patrols over Dunkirk during the evacuation of the BEF. On 27 May he was shot down and, having landed in the sea, was rescued after floating for an hour. He was awarded the Distinguished Service Order (DSO) in recognition of his exploits in France. The citation, published on 31 May in The London Gazette, read:

This officer has displayed great ability as a leader and intense desire to engage the enemy. On one occasion he continued to attack an enemy aircraft after his companion had been shot down, and his own machine hit in many places. His section shot down a Dornier 215 in flames one evening in May, and another in the course of an engagement the next day. In his last engagement he was seen at 200 feet on the tail of a Junkers 89, being subjected to intense fire from the ground over enemy occupied territory. This officer escaped from behind the German lines after being arrested and upheld the highest traditions of the Service.

— London Gazette, No. 34860, 31 May 1940.

Lee was presented with his DSO and DFC by King George VI in a ceremony at Hornchurch late the following month.

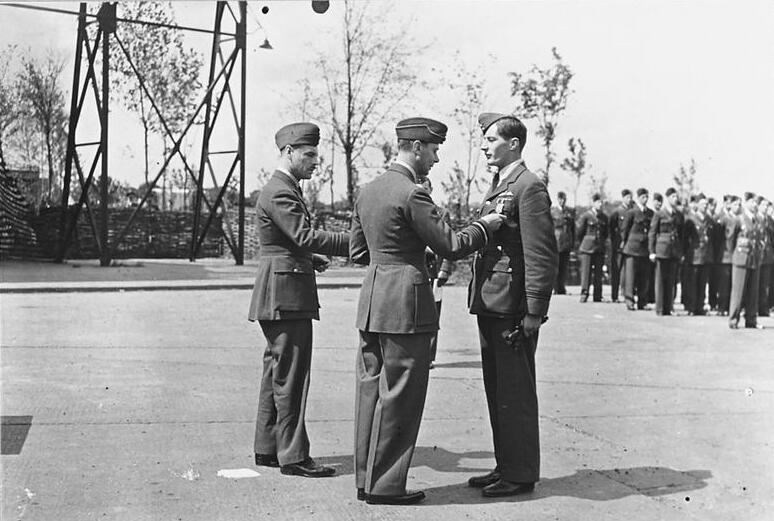
Lee receiving his DSO and DFC from King George VI at Hornchurch, 27 June 1940

=== Battle of Britain ===
By early July, Lee had returned to No. 85 Squadron, which by this time was back at Debden. Its role in the Battle of Britain was intercepting Luftwaffe bombers over Kent and the Thames Estuary. On 18 August, now known as The Hardest Day, the squadron was scrambled to Chelmsford to intercept an incoming bombing raid heading for Kent. During the resulting engagement Lee pursued some Messerschmitt Bf 109 fighters east past Margate. Ignoring orders from his commander, Squadron Leader Peter Townsend, to break away, Lee continued to chase the Bf 109s out over the North Sea. He was never seen again, and was posted as missing in action. Lee was mentioned in despatches in the 1941 New Year Honours.

With no known grave, Lee is commemorated on the Runneymeade Memorial at Englefield Green. He is credited with having destroyed at least nine aircraft and damaged one other. However the details of some of these are not available.
