= Gordon Duncan (RAF officer) =

Gordon Metcalfe Duncan
- Born: 25 March 1899; Edinburgh, Scotland
- Died: 7 December 1941 (aged 42); Edinburgh, Scotland
- Military career
- Allegiance: United Kingdom
- Branch: British Army; Royal Air Force
- Service years: 1917–1919
- Rank: Lieutenant
- Nickname: Grid
- Units: No. 60 Squadron; No. 56 Squadron
- Conflicts: First World War; Western Front
- Awards: Distinguished Flying Cross

Lieutenant Gordon Metcalfe Duncan DFC (25 March 1899 – 7 December 1941) was a Scottish flying ace of the Royal Flying Corps in World War I.

== Early life ==
Born in Edinburgh, the son of Isabel Graham (née Gibson) and John Duncan. He was educated at The Leys School in Cambridge and later at the University of Edinburgh.

== World War 1 ==
On turning 18, Duncan joined the Royal Flying Corps on 20 June 1917 as a cadet, and carried out his training with 28 Training Squadron based at Castle Bromwich. He was appointed a probationary temporary second lieutenant on 25 October 1917, and was confirmed in his rank on 18 February 1918.

He was then posted to 60 Squadron, where his first patrol on 10 April 1918 ended with him being forced to land behind the lines. Two months later, on 19 June, he was injured when a mechanical problem again forced him down. Flying the single-seat S.E.5a fighter he then gained eight victories in 28 days. Five of these were in August during the decisive Battle of Amiens, and a further three in the first week of September.

On 16 September 1918 he was appointed a flight commander with the acting rank of captain, to serve in 56 Squadron.

He was awarded the Distinguished Flying Cross on 3 December 1918, his citation reading:

Lieutenant Gordon Metcalfe Duncan.
A courageous fighter and skilful leader who has accounted for seven enemy aeroplanes. On 5 September [1918], when on escort duty, he attacked a formation of five Fokker biplanes; one of these he engaged at close range and it was seen to break up in the air; he then drove down a second out of control.

He left the RAF, being transferred to the unemployed list on 2 June 1919.

== Post war life ==
Duncan returned to Scotland to study civil engineering at the University of Edinburgh. He married Augusta Mildred Durran at Queen Street Church, Edinburgh, on 7 December 1929, and had two daughters and a son.

He had a successful career as a civil engineer in Kent, and returned to Edinburgh at the outbreak of war in 1939. Following a period of ill health with Bright's disease, he died on 7 December 1941.
