= John Warner (RAF officer) =

British World War I flying ace

John Weston Warner
- Born: 1899; Sunderland, Durham, England
- Died: 4 October 1918 (aged 18–19)
- Burial place: France
- Military career
- Allegiance: England
- Branch: Aviation
- Rank: Lieutenant
- Unit: No. 85 Squadron RAF
- Awards: Distinguished Flying Cross

Lieutenant John Weston Warner DFC was a British World War I flying ace credited with eight aerial victories.
