= No. 60 Squadron RAF =

Flying squadron of the Royal Air Force

- Squadron badge of No. 60 Squadron
- Active: 30 Apr 1916 – 22 Jan 1920; 1 Apr 1920 – Apr 1968; 3 Feb 1969 – 1 Apr 1992; 1 Jun 1992 – present
- Country: United Kingdom
- Branch: Royal Air Force
- Type: Flying training squadron
- Role: Advanced helicopter flying training
- Part of: 9 Regiment, Army Air Corps
- Home station: RAF Shawbury
- Mottos: Per ardua ad aethera tendo (Latin for 'I strive through difficulties to the sky')
- Aircraft: Airbus H135 Juno HT.1
- Battle honours: Western Front (1914–1918)*, Somme (1916)*, Arras, Hindenburg Line*, Waziristan (1920–1925), Mohmand (1927), North West Frontier (1930–1931), Mohmand (1933), North West Frontier (1925–1939), Burma (1914–1942)*, Malaya (1941–1942)*, Arakan (1942–1944), North Burma (1944), Manipur (1944)*, Burma (1944–1945), *Honours marked with an asterisk are emblazoned on the squadron standard

Commanders
- Current commander: Squadron Leader Nick Summers (August 2020 – present)

Insignia
- Squadron badge heraldry: A markhor's head, commemorating many years of service in North-West India, the markhor being a mountain goat frequenting the Khyber Pass. Approved by King George VI in December 1937.
- Squadron codes: AD (Apr 1939 – Sep 1939); MU (Sep 1934 – Feb 1942, Aug 1943 – Oct 1946); A–Z (Wessex)
- Post-1950 squadron roundel

No. 60 Squadron of the Royal Air Force was formed in 1916 at Gosport. It is currently part of No. 1 Flying Training School based at RAF Shawbury in Shropshire flying the Airbus H135 Juno HT.1.

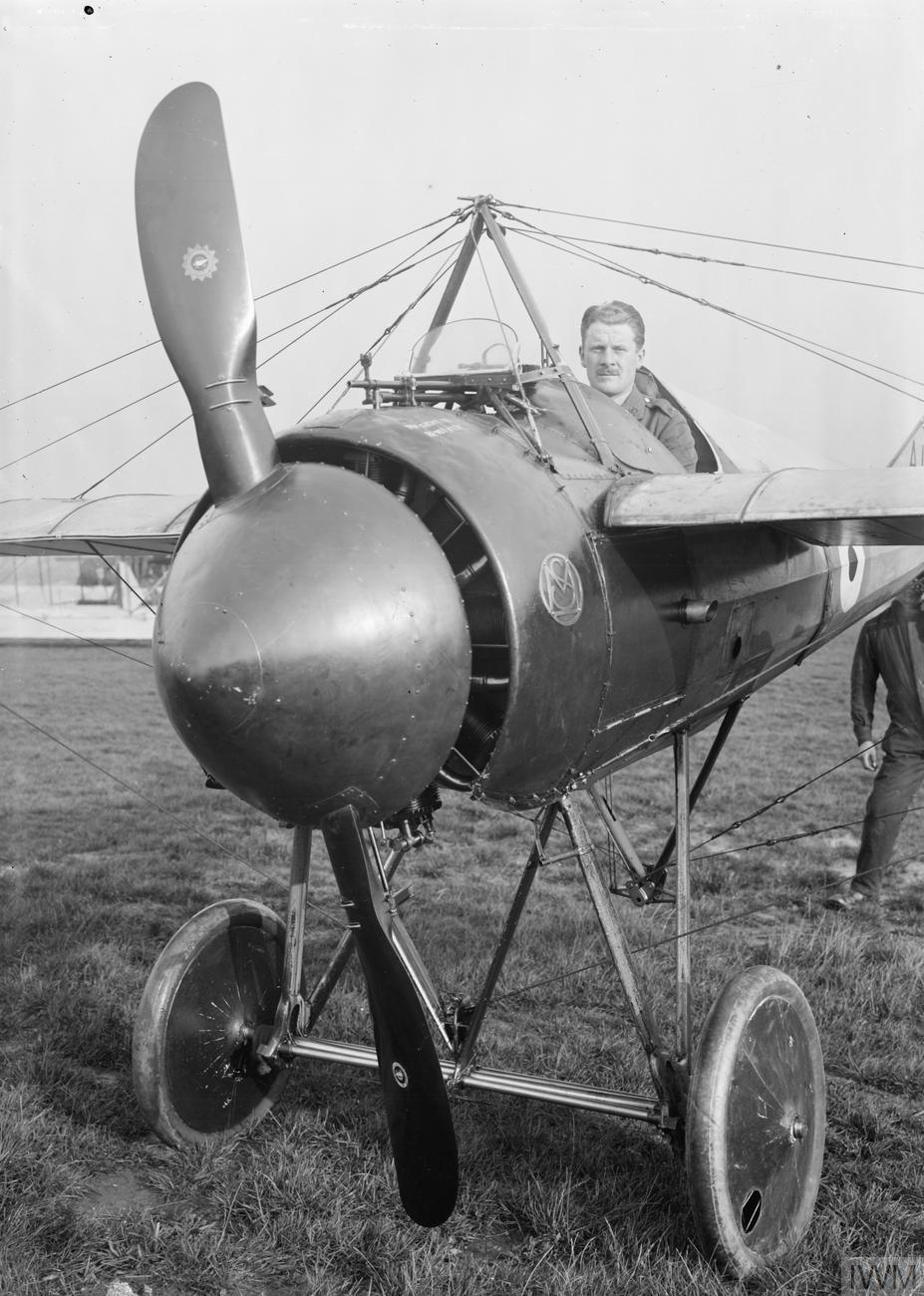
RFC Morane-Saulnier Type N Bullet

The squadron badge is a markhor's head and was approved by King George VI in December 1937. Chosen to commemorate many years of service in North-West India, the markhor being a mountain goat frequenting the Khyber Pass. The horns of a markhor were presented to the squadron in 1964.

The squadron motto is Per ardua ad aethera tendo – 'I strive through difficulties to the sky'.

== First World War service ==
Formed at Gosport on 30 April 1916, barely a month had passed before the unit and its Morane-Saulnier N's were despatched to France. The squadron's initial pilot officers included Harold Balfour and Charles Portal, later Under-Secretary of State for Air and Chief of the Air Staff respectively, while Robert Smith-Barry, later to revolutionise British pilot training, was a flight commander and (from July to December 1916), the squadron's commanding officer.

After suffering heavy losses during the Battle of the Somme, the squadron re-equipped with Nieuport Scouts and soon acquired a first-class reputation for itself. On 2 June 1917, Captain W. A. "Billy" Bishop received the Victoria Cross for his solo attack on a German aerodrome destroying three enemy aircraft in the air and several 'probables' on the ground before returning unhurt in a badly damaged aircraft. A month later, S.E.5 fighters arrived and these remained with the squadron until it was disbanded on 22 January 1920.

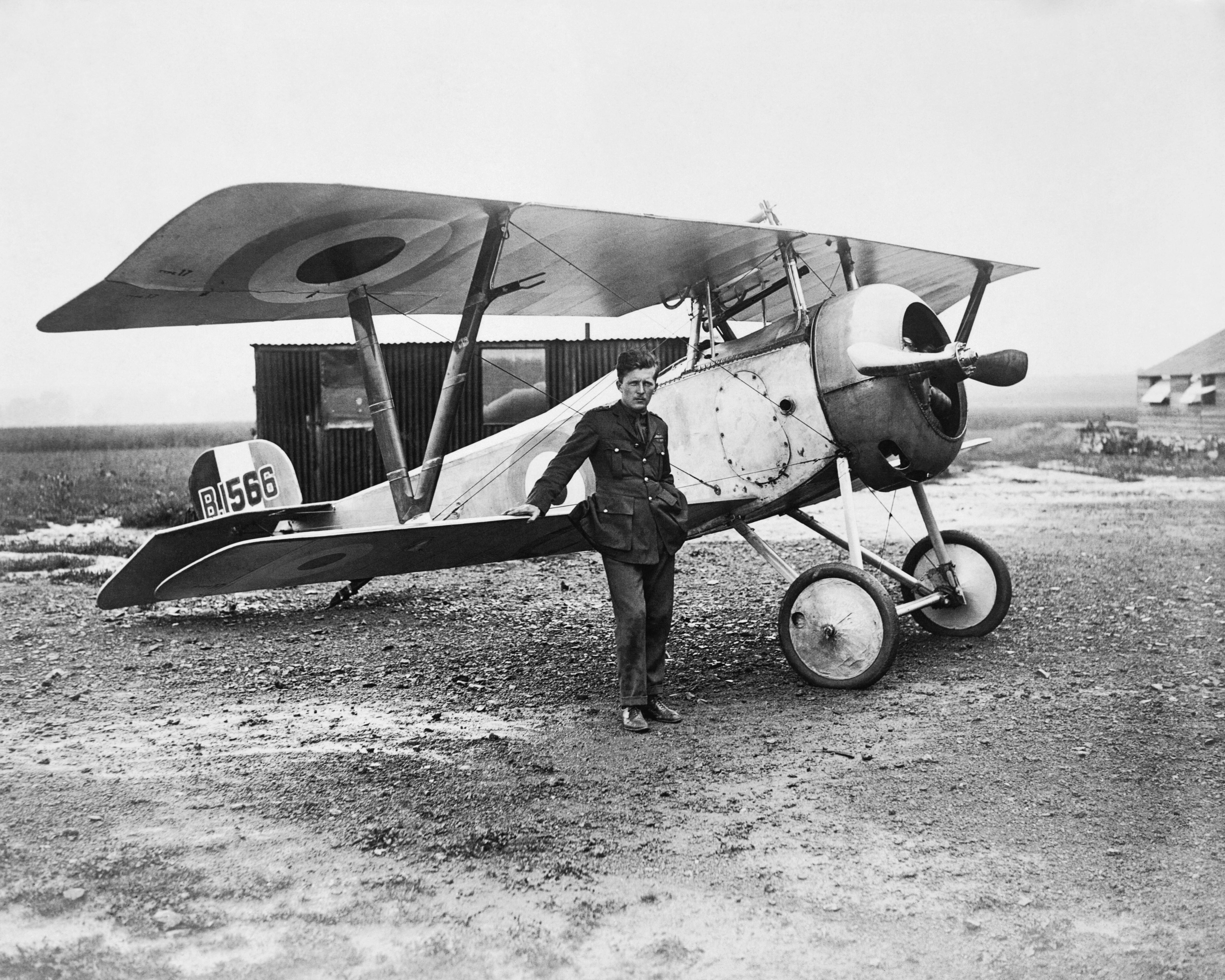
Bishop and a Nieuport 17 fighter

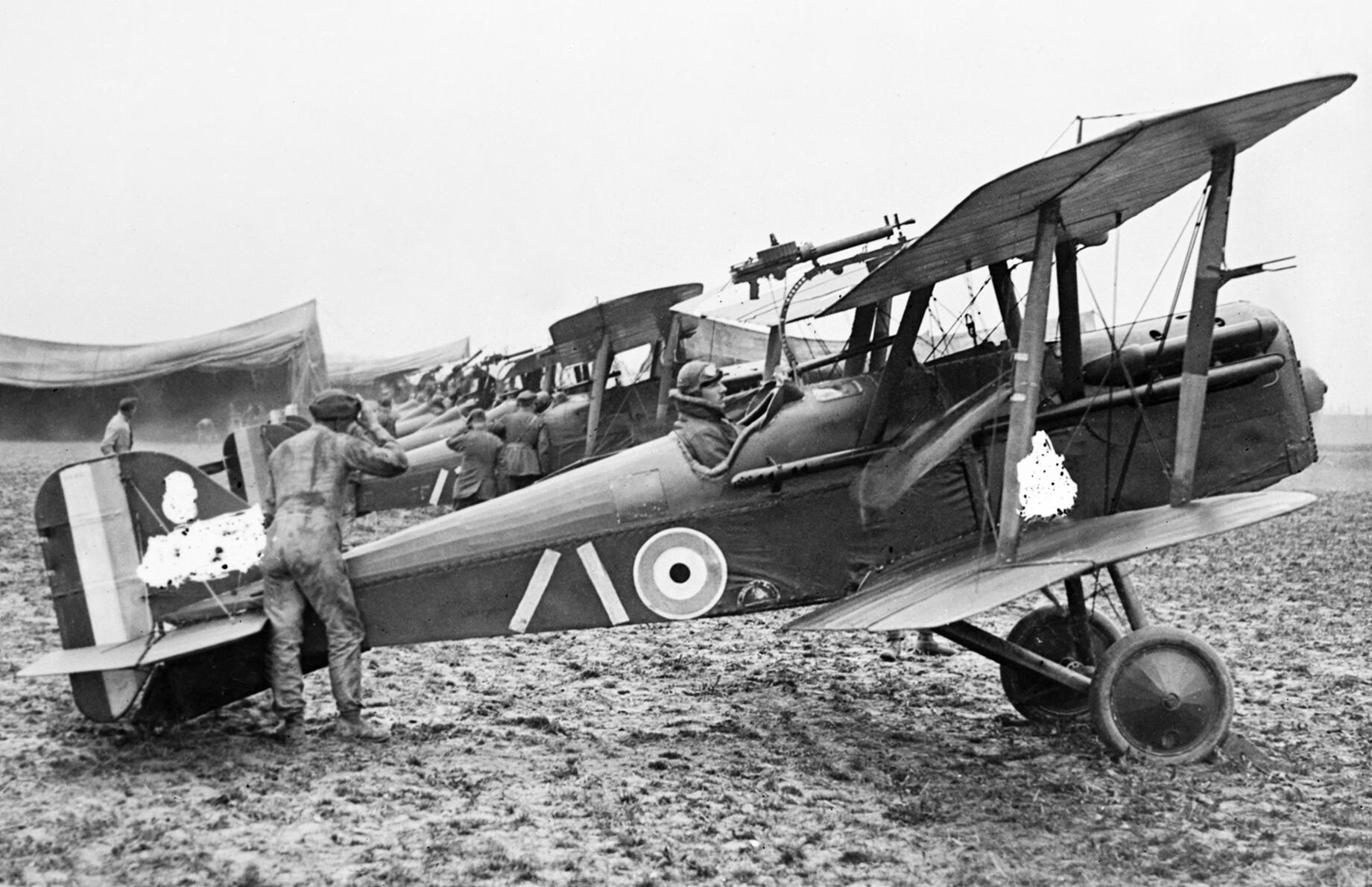
S.E.5a aircraft of No. 32 Squadron RAF. Similar to those operated by No. 60 Squadron

The squadron claimed 320 aerial victories. Twenty-six flying aces served in the squadron during the war; notable among them were:

- Albert Ball – Victoria Cross winner
- Alexander Beck
- James Belgrave
- Alan Duncan Bell-Irving
- William Avery Bishop – Canadian Victoria Cross winner
- Keith Caldwell – future Air Commodore
- Robert L. Chidlaw-Roberts
- John Doyle
- Art Duncan
- Gordon Duncan
- William M. Fry
- John Griffith
- Harold A. Hamersley
- H. George Hegarty
- Spencer B. Horn
- William Molesworth
- Sydney Pope
- John William Rayner
- Alfred William Saunders
- Alan Scott
- Frank O. Soden
- Robert Kenneth Whitney

== The inter-war years ==
Reformed at Lahore in India from the disbanded No. 97 Squadron RAF on 1 April 1920, the squadron, now equipped with Airco DH.10 Amiens bombers, began an association with the Middle and Far East that was to last for 48 years. Between the wars, the unit found itself involved in many conflicts along the North West Frontier, including Pink's War, flying Airco DH.9A and Westland Wapiti general-purpose aircraft until Bristol Blenheims arrived six months before the start of the Second World War.

== Second World War ==
=== Burma and Malaya ===
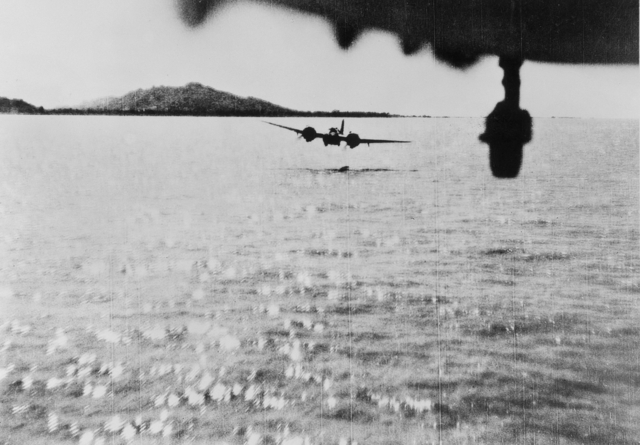
Blenheims of No. 60 Squadron flying at low level for a mast-head attack on a Japanese coaster off Akyab, Burma on 11 October 1942

The squadron moved to Burma in February 1941. After the outbreak of war against Japan the squadron fought in Malaya. Two aircraft, L4912 and L4915, remained in Burma. Both were Blenheim Is and they were destroyed on 20 and 21 January 1942 respectively. L4912 had been damaged beyond repair during a mission in Burma and L4915 was destroyed by enemy bombing.

When the war against Japan broke out on 8 December 1941 No. 60 Squadron was ordered to attack Japanese shipping near Kota Bharu. L4913 was shot down by Japanese anti-aircraft fire over the Gulf of Siam while attacking the Awagisan Maru. The pilot, Flight Lieutenant William Bowden, survived the crash and was taken prisoner. He was the first allied airman captured by the Japanese. He was imprisoned at the Zentsuji POW Camp where he remained until late June 1945. He was then transferred to Tokyo No. 12D Camp at Mitsushima where he was eventually freed in September 1945.

On 24 December 1941 the remnant of squadrons ground crew and a few of its air crew, having lost all their aircraft in action, sailed from Singapore on the SS Darvel to Burma. They arrived in Rangoon on 1 January 1942 and were joined on 7 January 1942 by No. 113 Squadron and a couple of No. 45 Squadron's Bristol Blenheim IVs. No. 60 Squadron's spare aircrew were assigned to No. 113 Squadron as needed. Because the three squadrons lacked both aircraft and supplies they were seldom able to put more than seven aircraft up at one time, meaning they tended to operate as one. No. 60 Squadron's Blenheim aircrews manned No. 113 Squadron's planes for the first bombing raid on Bangkok and participated again in the second one later in January.

=== India ===
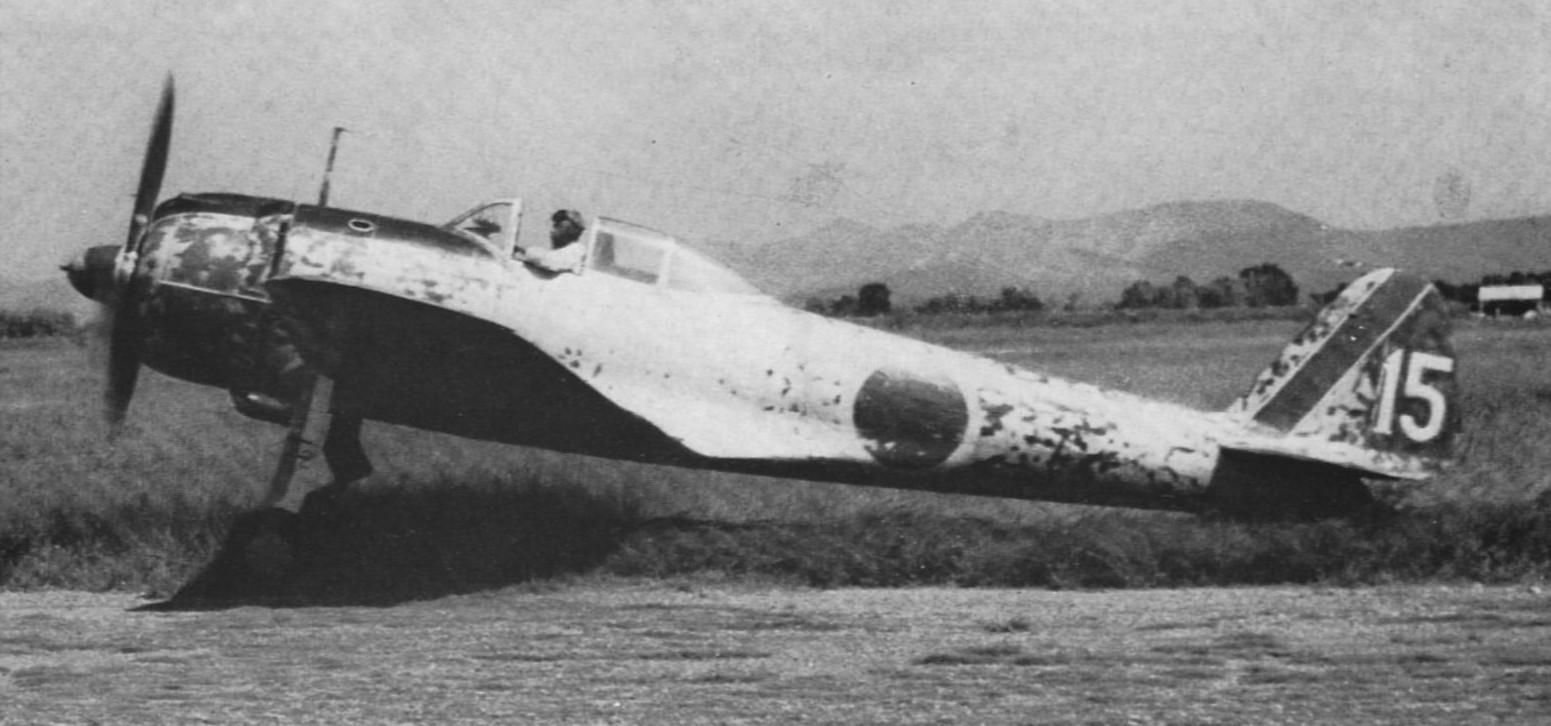
Nakajima Ki-43-IIa

The squadron had suffered heavily at the hands of the advancing Japanese forces and was declared non-operational and moved to Asansol, India along with No. 45 and 113 Squadrons. Once in India the squadron was re-equipped with Blenheim Mk IV's. While returning to India from Burma after a bombing mission to Sitwe, Burma, on 22 May a Blenheim the squadron was attacked by Nakajima Ki-43 fighters from 64 Sentai. Flight Sergeant Jock McLuckie was one of the Blenheim's gunners. McLuckie shot down Japanese ace Lt Colonel Tateo Katō who commanded the Sentai and damaged two other Ki-43s.

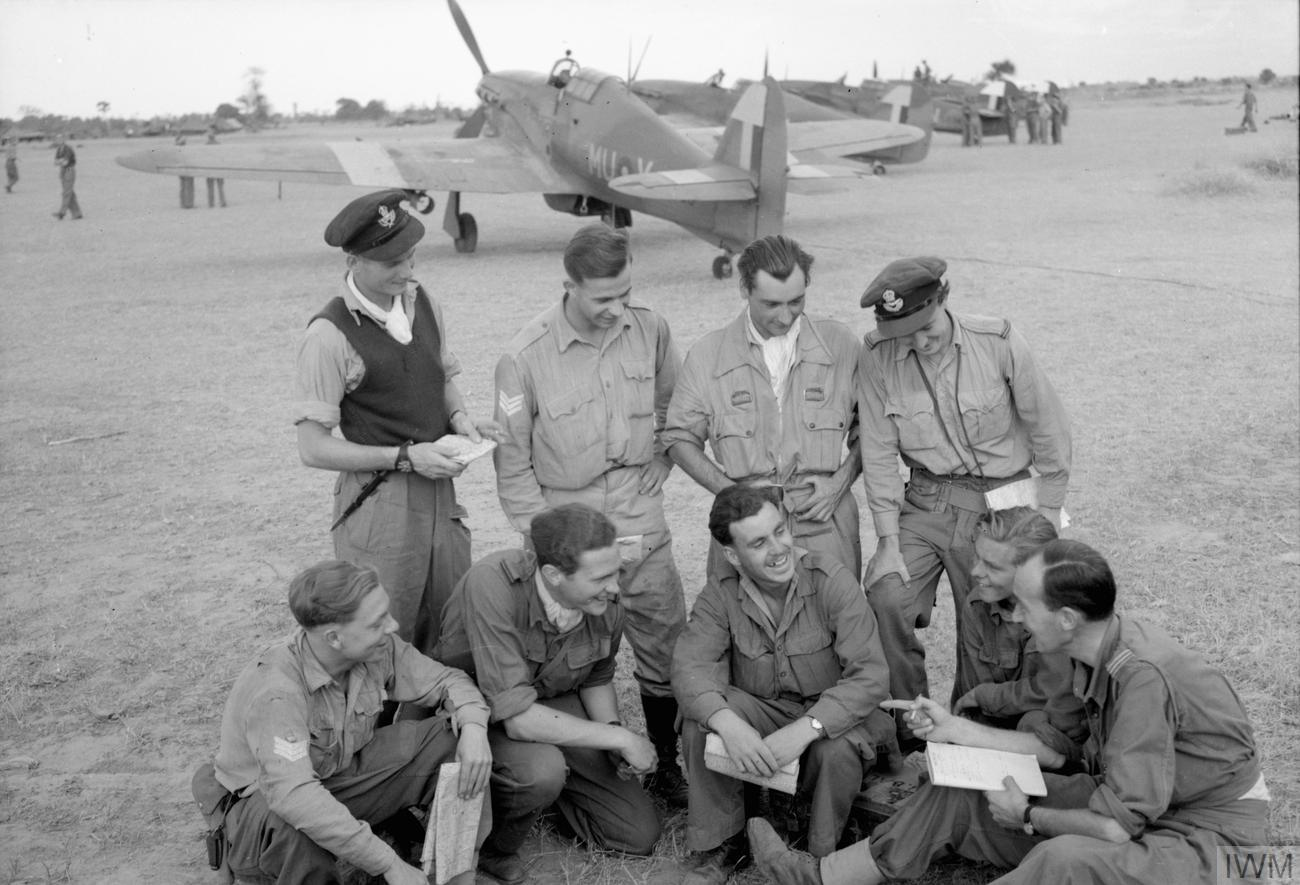
No. 60 Squadron Hurricane and crewmen, possibly in Burma

On 30 March 1943 an English-Argentinian from Estancia Dos Hermanos, Los Pinos, Richard (Ricardo) Campbell Lindsell, who had joined the Royal Canadian Air Force, was appointed squadron leader. Lindsell had been educated at Stowe School in England and had been based with No. 139 Squadron RAF.

In May the squadron was stood down while replacement aircraft were sought. By August the decision had been made to re-equip the squadron with Hawker Hurricane IIc fighter-bombers. Training was commenced in August at Madras and by November the Hurricanes were providing escort duties. In January 1944 the squadron began ground attack missions and troop support against the Japanese in Burma. During one month in 1944 the squadron completed 728 sorties and also received considerable praise for the accuracy of its bombing by allied ground troops. For their efforts and his leadership Lindsell was awarded the DFC.

In May 1945 the Hurricanes were replaced by Republic Thunderbolt fighters.

== Post Second World War ==
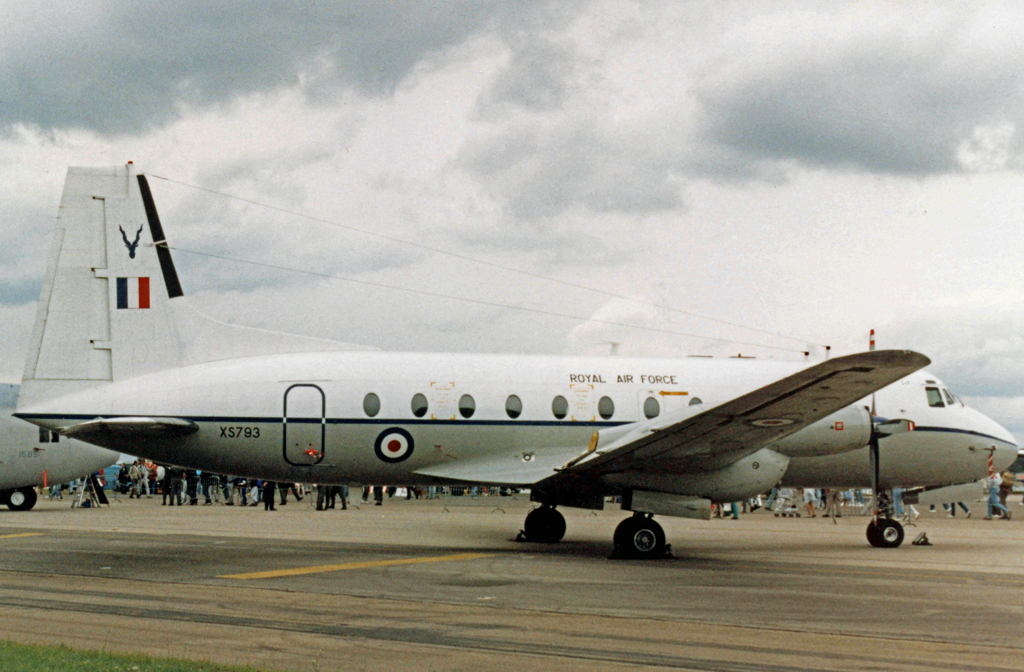
Andover CC.2 of No. 60 Squadron in 1987

Shortly after the Japanese surrender, the squadron moved to Java and was soon in action against Indonesian rebels. A year later, No. 60 transferred to Singapore prior to converting to Supermarine Spitfire F18s and these were employed in attacks against Communist guerrillas in Malayan Emergency until the arrival of de Havilland Vampires in late 1950 and then de Havilland Venoms in 1955.

By the time Gloster Meteor NF.14 night-fighters arrived in October 1959, the unit had returned to RAF Tengah in Singapore. A change followed in July 1961 when Gloster Javelin FAW.9/FAW.9R fighters arrived and these remained until April 1968 when the squadron was disbanded. On 3 September 1964, an Indonesian Air Force Lockheed C-130 Hercules crashed into the Straits of Malacca while trying to evade interception by a Javelin FAW.9 of No 60 Squadron. On 3 February 1969, the Royal Air Force Communications Squadron based at RAF Wildenrath in Germany was retitled No. 60 Squadron and the unit found itself flying ancient Percival Pembroke transports until more modern Hawker Siddeley Andover arrived in 1987.

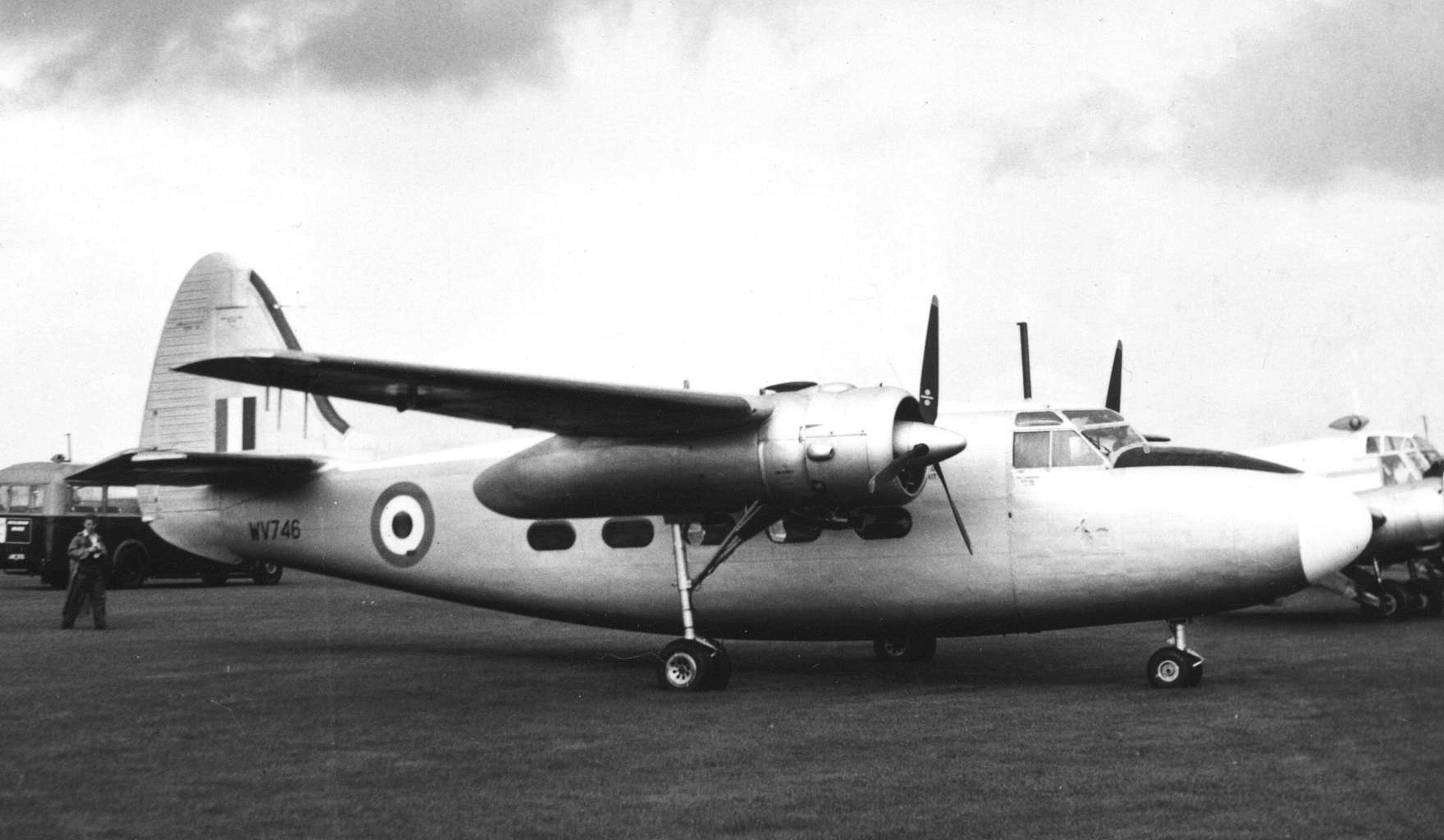
Percival Pembroke C.1

No. 60 Squadron's Pembrokes were modified versions of No. 81 Squadron RAF's C(PR).1 photo-reconnaissance Pembrokes. Their use as a Cold War surveillance aircraft was highly classified until the late 1990s. Pembrokes of No. 60 Squadron often flew along the air corridors between West Germany and Berlin, established during the 1948–49 Berlin Blockade during which the West mounted a massive year-long airlift of supplies to the beleaguered city. While they were widely used as transport aircraft by the RAF, their true function along that particular route was known only to a few within military and intelligence circles. These aircraft were employed for Operation Hallmark, a sensitive intelligence operation in which the Pembrokes were fitted with high-powered reconnaissance cameras to acquire imagery of Soviet and East German military installations and airfields below the tightly controlled air corridors. These were subsequently analyzed by photo intelligence and imagery experts, who recorded any changes in the Warsaw Pact forces facing the West. Alterations in the order of battle, appearance of new equipment and movement of military units were all items of great interest. At the time of the Soviet invasion of Czechoslovakia in 1968, it was Percival Pembrokes that provided Western analysts with some of the first indications as to where the Soviet ground forces had come from.

From March 1987 Hawker Siddeley Andovers arrived replacing the squadron's Pembrokes.

As with many other Germany-based units, the end of the Cold War saw many moves. No. 60 disbanded at Wildenrath on 1 April 1992, but reformed two months later on 1 June 1992 at RAF Benson in Oxfordshire with Westland Wessex HC.2 helicopters. This proved a short-lived stay and the squadron was disbanded on 31 March 1997 and the numberplate passed on to the RAF element of the Defence Helicopter Flying School (DHFS) at RAF Shawbury on 1 May 1997. On 11 February 1997, the last two Westland Wessex's departed for RNAY Fleetlands. As of 1 April 2018, the squadron began transitioning to the Juno helicopter as part of 9 Regiment Army Air Corps and DHFS in order to provide Advanced and Tactical Rotary Wing training to both pilots and crewmen, prior to their postings to Operational Conversion Units.

== See also ==
- List of Royal Air Force aircraft squadrons
