= Spencer B. Horn =

British soldier and WWI flying ace

Spencer Bertram Horn
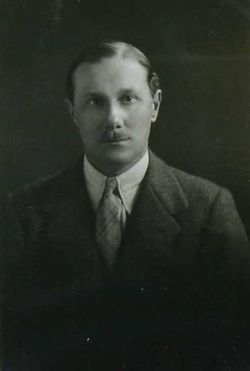
- Born: 18 April 1895; Redbourn, Wiltshire, England
- Died: 18 October 1969 (aged 74); Aldbourne, Wiltshire, England
- Military career
- Allegiance: United Kingdom
- Branch: British Army; Royal Air Force
- Service years: 1914–1946
- Rank: Lieutenant Colonel
- Nickname: Nigger
- Units: 3rd Dragoon Guards; Machine Gun Corps; No. 60 Squadron RFC; No. 85 Squadron RAF
- Commands: "C" Flight, No. 85 Squadron RAF; 3rd Carabiniers
- Conflicts: World War I • Western Front; World War II • Burma campaign
- Awards: Military Cross

Lieutenant Colonel Spencer Bertram Horn MC (18 April 1895 – 18 October 1969) was a British soldier and World War I flying ace credited with thirteen aerial victories. Although seconded to aviation duty during the First World War, he returned to his Dragoon Guards regiment after the war ended. Horn then served in India in the 1920s and 1930s, while his cavalry unit modernised to tanks. Horn would serve in India during the Second World War, and retire from active duty on 3 October 1946, and from the reserves on 15 November 1950.

== Biography ==
=== Early life and background ===
Horn was the youngest of seven children born to Penelope Elizabeth Belt and William Austin Horn. His two older brothers were born in Australia, but Horn's parents sailed back to England and landed the day before Horn was born.

=== World War I ===
After passing out from the Royal Military College, Sandhurst, as a "Gentlemen Cadet", Horn was commissioned as a second lieutenant in 3rd (Prince of Wales's) Dragoon Guards regiment on 1 October 1914. He was promoted to lieutenant on 27 September 1915. On 29 February 1916 Horn was seconded to the Machine Gun Corps (Cavalry Branch), and was later transferred to the Royal Flying Corps, being appointed a flying officer on 3 April 1917.

His first assignment after training was to No. 60 Squadron RFC, from April to November 1917; where his flight commander was Billy Bishop. Horn scored his first two victories while flying a Nieuport fighter for 60 Squadron on the second and sixth of May 1917. The squadron upgraded to the Royal Aircraft Factory SE.5a. On this new mount, Horn and William Molesworth set an Albatros D.III afire on 5 August 1917. When Bishop transferred out of the squadron to form and command No. 85 Squadron RFC, Horn took his place as "C" Flight commander on 29 August 1917 with the acting-rank of captain. Horn went on to run his string to six victories by 5 September 1917. In October 1917 Horn was awarded the Military Cross. He then went to instructor duty at Ayr with the Home Establishment.

He thus had over an eight-month lapse before he began scoring again as a flight commander in No. 85 Squadron; Bishop had him transferred in March 1918. Beginning on 30 May 1918 and ongoing until 17 September 1918, he reeled off seven more wins. His final tally was seven enemy planes destroyed, six driven down out of control.

Horn was promoted to captain in the 3rd Dragoons on 5 December 1918, and on 4 December 1919 relinquished his temporary commission as a flight lieutenant in the Royal Air Force to return to his regiment.

=== Inter-war career ===
In October 1922, while based at Sialkot Cantonment, India, the 3rd Dragoon Guards were merged with the 6th Dragoon Guards (Carabiniers) to form the 3rd/6th Dragoon Guards, and Horn was appointed a captain in the new regiment, with seniority from 5 December 1918. Horn went onto half-pay between 15 November 1922 and 15 February 1923, and the following day was seconded to the Staff, finally returning to his regiment, now based at Tidworth Camp, Wiltshire, on 9 April 1927.

In 1928 the 3rd/6th Dragoons were renamed the 3rd Carabiniers. Horn was promoted to major on 4 October 1931. The 3rd Carabiniers returned to Sialkot in October 1936, where they were converted from cavalry to tanks, joining the Royal Armoured Corps in early 1939.

=== World War II ===
The 3rd Carabiniers remained in India during the war, and Horn was promoted to lieutenant-colonel, taking command of the regiment, on 24 October 1941. On completion of his period of service in command on 24 October 1944, Horn remained on full pay as a supernumerary officer. His papers, held in the Imperial War Museum, make references to his involvement in deception planning prior to the Normandy landings and in the liberation of Norway.

=== Later life ===
Horn retired from the Army on 3 October 1946, but remained in the Reserve of Officers until 15 November 1950.

He died at Aldbourne, England, on 18 October 1969.

== Honours and awards ==
- Military Cross (18 October 1917)

Lieutenant Spencer Bertram Horn, Dragoon Guards and Royal Flying Corps.

"For conspicuous gallantry and devotion to duty. He has destroyed several hostile machines and driven down others out of control. On one occasion he attacked alone four enemy aircraft, shooting one down completely out of control. He has twice cooperated with an infantry attack, diving to a very low altitude. He has shown great skill and gallantry on all occasions."

- King Haakon VII's Cross of Liberty, conferred "in recognition of distinguished services in the cause of the Allies" (16 March 1948)
