= Gordon Raphael (RAF officer) =

Canadian flying ace of WWII

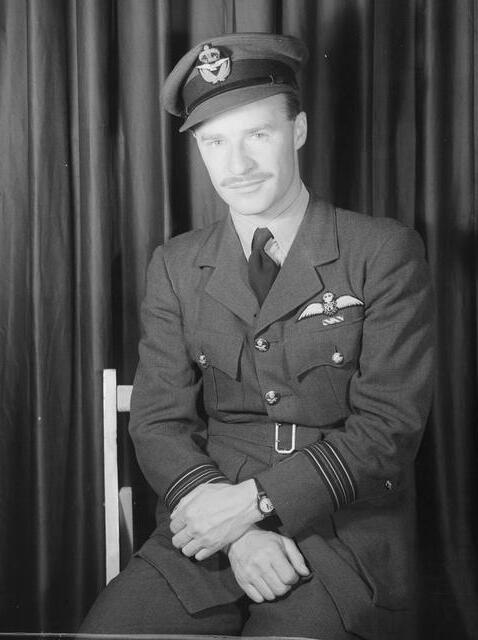
- Portrait of Raphael taken around the time of being awarded the Distinguished Service Order
- Born: 25 August 1915; Brantford, Ontario, Canada
- Died: 11 April 1945 (aged 29); Southeast England
- Burial place: Cudham Churchyard, Orpington, England
- Military career
- Allegiance: Canada
- Branch: Royal Air Force
- Service years: 1936–1945
- Rank: Group Captain
- Commands: Biggin Hill station Manston station No. 85 Squadron
- Conflicts: Second World War: The Blitz; Operation Diver
- Awards: Distinguished Service Order; Distinguished Flying Cross & Bar; Mention in Despatches (2)

Gordon Raphael, DSO, DFC & Bar (25 August 1915 – 11 April 1945) was a Canadian flying ace who served with the Royal Air Force (RAF) during the Second World War. He was credited with having shot down at least seven aircraft.

Born in Brantford, Raphael joined the RAF in 1936 and was serving in Bomber Command on the outbreak of the Second World War. He flew Armstrong Whitworth Whitley bombers with Nos. 77 and 10 Squadrons during the early stages of the war, and was mentioned in despatches and awarded the Distinguished Flying Cross (DFC). In early 1941 he was transferred to night fighting duties. He achieved most of his aerial victories during the Blitz on London, many with his radar operator William Addison, and was awarded a Bar to his DFC. In May 1942, he was appointed to command of No. 85 Squadron, overseeing the unit's conversion to de Havilland Mosquito night fighters. Awarded the Distinguished Service Order in February 1943, he held base postings for most of the remainder of the war. Appointed commander of Biggin Hill station in February 1945, he was killed in a flying accident when his Supermarine Spitfire fighter collided with a transport aircraft.

== Early life ==
Gordon Learmouth Raphael was born on 25 August 1915 to Howard Raphael, a doctor, and his wife in Brantford, a city in the Ontario province of Canada. Raphael went to school in Quebec City and in 1934, went to England for tertiary study. He desired a career in aviation design and commenced studies at the Chelsea College of Aeronautical and Automobile Engineering. He gave this up the following year and joined the Royal Air Force (RAF) on a short service commission. After completing his initial training, he was commissioned as an acting pilot officer in January 1936. His initial posting was to No. 7 Squadron, which was based at Finningley Yorkshire and operated the Handley Page Heyford, an all-metal biplane night bomber.

== Second World War ==
On the outbreak of the Second World War, Raphael was a flying officer serving with No. 77 Squadron, which operated the largest of the RAF's bomber aircraft at the time, the Armstrong Whitworth Whitley. Flying from Driffield, in the north he carried out his first sortie on the night of 8 September 1939. This involved dropping propaganda leaflets on Essen in the Ruhr but on the return flight to England he was low on fuel and had to land at an airfield in Buc, in France. He flew several more missions of this nature over the next few months. On 20 February 1940 he was mentioned in despatches, the first Canadian to be recognised in this way in the war. Further missions followed, including two long-range sorties to Poland which entailed refuelling stops in France.

From April, No. 77 Squadron began to carry out bombing raids from Kinloss in Scotland. On 17 May 1940, Raphael was awarded the Distinguished Flying Cross (DFC). Buoyed by the news of his award, he flew a sortie the night following the announcement even though he was due to stand down. While flying to his target, an oil refinery near Hannover in Germany, his Whitley was intercepted by a Messerschmitt Bf 110 night fighter. The attack badly damaged the aircraft although Raphael's rear gunner claimed to have destroyed the Bf 110 as it passed to the rear of the Whitley. Raphael ditched the aircraft in the North Sea and he and his crew were recovered by the Royal Navy destroyer HMS Javelin after a few hours floating in a dinghy. Raphael was wounded in the feet during the engagement and had to be hospitalised for two months. During his recuperation he was promoted to flight lieutenant.

Once Raphael recovered from his wounds, he returned to operational duties in August with No. 10 Squadron, again flying Whitleys. He only flew ten sorties, and on one of these his Whitley was again targeted by a night fighter but it was driven off. He was then posted away on instructing duties at the School of General Reconnaissance.

=== Night fighters ===
At the start of 1941, Raphael was sent to No. 96 Squadron, stationed at RAF Cranage in Cheshire, as one of its flight commanders. This was a squadron of Fighter Command, tasked with night fighting duties over Liverpool using Hawker Hurricane fighters. It saw limited success with the Hurricanes and in April began converting to the two-seater Boulton Paul Defiant nightfighter. Raphael was posted to No. 85 Squadron soon afterwards. His new unit, based at RAF Hunsdon, Hertfordshire had just become operational with the twin-engined Douglas Havoc nightfighter (a conversion of a light bomber).

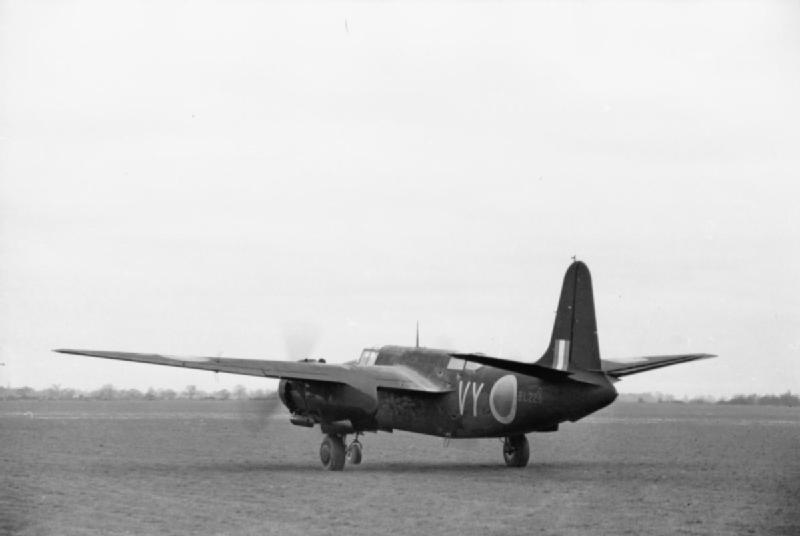
A Douglas Havoc night fighter of No. 85 Squadron

The Blitz, the Luftwaffe's bombing campaign against England, was winding down and its last major raid was mounted on the night of 10 May. Guided by his radar operator, sergeant William Addison, Raphael intercepted and destroyed a Heinkel He 111 medium bomber to the north of London that night. He shot down one He 111 off the Thames estuary three nights later and probably destroyed a second near Gravesend. On 23 June, off Harwich, he destroyed a Junkers Ju 88 medium bomber. The following month, on the night of 13 July, he shot down a He 111 to the east of Foulness Island. In August he was recognised for his successes with an award of a Bar to his DFC. (Note: Addison was awarded the Distinguished Flying Medal for his role.) This was gazetted on 23 August and the published citation read:

This officer has proved himself to be a relentless and skilful night fighter pilot. Since May, 1941, he has destroyed three and probably another of the enemy's aircraft.

— London Gazette, 15 July 1941

In early September Raphael was promoted to temporary squadron leader and given command of one of No. 85 Squadron's flights. He shot down a Ju 88 night fighter over Clacton on the night of 16 September. Tactics changed from the start of 1942, and the squadron's aircraft began operating over the North Sea but the Havocs proved to be inadequate for the task. It also briefly trialled a de Havilland Mosquito night fighter fitted with the Turbinlite searchlight but this was not a success. In May Raphael was promoted to acting wing commander and placed in charge of the squadron. On the night of 30 July, Raphael claimed to have damaged a Ju 88 near Cambridge but it is possible that anti-aircraft fire accounted for this success. Three nights later over Dengle Flats, he destroyed a Ju 88; on this occasion, his radar operator was a Sergeant Bray.

In mid-August, No. 85 Squadron was taken off operations so it could train up on conventional Mosquito night fighters, which were replacing the Havocs. It resumed operations in October. Although some pilots claimed to have damaged some Luftwaffe aircraft, it was not until Raphael, flying with Addison as his radar operator, destroyed a Ju 88 on the night of 17 January 1943 that a definitive aerial victory was achieved for the squadron with its new Mosquitos. Respected as a commander despite his intolerance of vices such as smoking and drinking, which he believed could affect a pilot's performance, his tenure in charge of the squadron ended shortly afterwards. In February Raphael was awarded the Distinguished Service Order (DSO). (Note: Addison, who had been promoted to warrant officer, was awarded the Distinguished Flying Cross.) This was gazetted on 2 February 1943 reading:

Since being awarded a Bar to the Distinguished Flying Cross, Wing Commander Raphael has destroyed 3 enemy aircraft at night. By his inspiring leadership, great skill and untiring efforts, he has contributed in a large measure to the high morale and operational efficiency of the squadron he commands.

— London Gazette, 2 February 1943

=== Later war service ===
Raphael was briefly the station commander at RAF Castle Camps in Cambridgeshire and then from April 1943 he was in charge at RAF Manston in Kent. During Operation Diver, the RAF's campaign against the V-1 flying bombs launched at England from France in June and July 1944, Raphael occasionally flew Mosquitos on interception missions; he destroyed one V-1 on the night of 29 June and a second on 6 July. In the 1945 New Year Honours, Raphael was mentioned in despatches. In February 1945, Raphael was promoted to group captain and given command of the RAF station at Biggin Hill.

On 11 April 1945, Raphael was killed in a midair collision of his Supermarine Spitfire fighter with an American Curtiss C-46 Commando transport aircraft over the southeast of England. Survived by his wife and son, Raphael is buried at Cudham Churchyard in Orpington. He is credited with the shooting down of seven aircraft as well as one aircraft probably destroyed and one damaged. Additionally, he destroyed two V-1 flying bombs.
