= No. 85 Squadron RAF =

Defunct flying squadron of the Royal Air Force

- Active: 1 August 1917 – 3 July 1919; 1 June 1938 – 31 October 1958; 30 November 1958 – 31 March 1963; 1 April 1963 – 19 December 1975; 19 December 1975 – 1 July 1991; 2008 – August 2011
- Country: United Kingdom
- Branch: Royal Air Force
- Nickname(s): Flying Foxes
- Motto(s): Latin: Nocto Diuque Venamur ("We hunt by day and night")
- Battle honours: Western Front, 1917–1918; France & Low Countries, 1939–1940; Battle of Britain, 1940; Home Defence, 1940–1944; Fortress Europe, 1943; Normandy, 1944; France & Germany, 1944–1945.

Commanders
- Notable commanders: William Avery "Billy" Bishop; Edward "Mick" Mannock; Peter Townsend; John Cunningham

Insignia
- Squadron Badge: On an ogress a hexagon voided The hexagon was no. 85's World War I identity insignia and the ogress signifies the night
- Squadron Codes: NO (Sep 1938 – Sep 1939); VY (Sep 1939 – Apr 1951)
- Post-1950 aircraft insignia

No. 85 Squadron was a squadron of the Royal Air Force. It last served in 2011, as No. 85 (Reserve) Squadron posted to RAF Church Fenton.

== History ==
=== In World War I ===
No. 85 Squadron was formed at Upavon on 1 August 1917; the station was home to the Royal Flying Corps Central Flying School. Shortly afterwards, the squadron moved to Mousehold Heath near Norwich under the command of Major R A Archer. During November 1917 the squadron transferred to Hounslow Heath Aerodrome, and in March 1918 Major William Avery Bishop VC, DSO, MC, took command and carried out his orders to prepare and train for front line duties in France. On 1 April 1918 No. 85 Squadron was transferred into the newly formed Royal Air Force. Following this period of training the squadron deployed to France during May 1918. Equipped with the Sopwith Dolphin and later the Royal Aircraft Factory S.E.5A, it flew fighter patrols and ground attack sorties over the Western Front until the Armistice was signed.

On 21 June 1918, there was a change of command and training methods following the arrival of the new CO, Major Edward "Mick" Mannock DSO, MC. Rather than fight as individuals, the squadron was taught to act as a unit during combat. During a patrol on 26 July 1918, accompanying Lt DC Inglis over the front line, Major Mannock failed to return, depriving 85 Squadron of its leader. On 18 July 1919, Major Mannock was awarded a posthumous VC. No. 85 Squadron amassed 99 victories during its short involvement in the conflict. Besides Bishop and Mannock, the squadron had other notable aces, such as Malcolm C. McGregor, Arthur Randall, John Warner, Alec Reid, Spencer B. Horn, Walter H. Longton and Lawrence Callahan. 85 Squadron returned to the UK in February 1919. The squadron disbanded on 3 July 1919.

The Squadron became notorious after it rejected the ace James McCudden, who had risen through the ranks, as commanding officer because of its officers' snobbery.

=== World War II ===
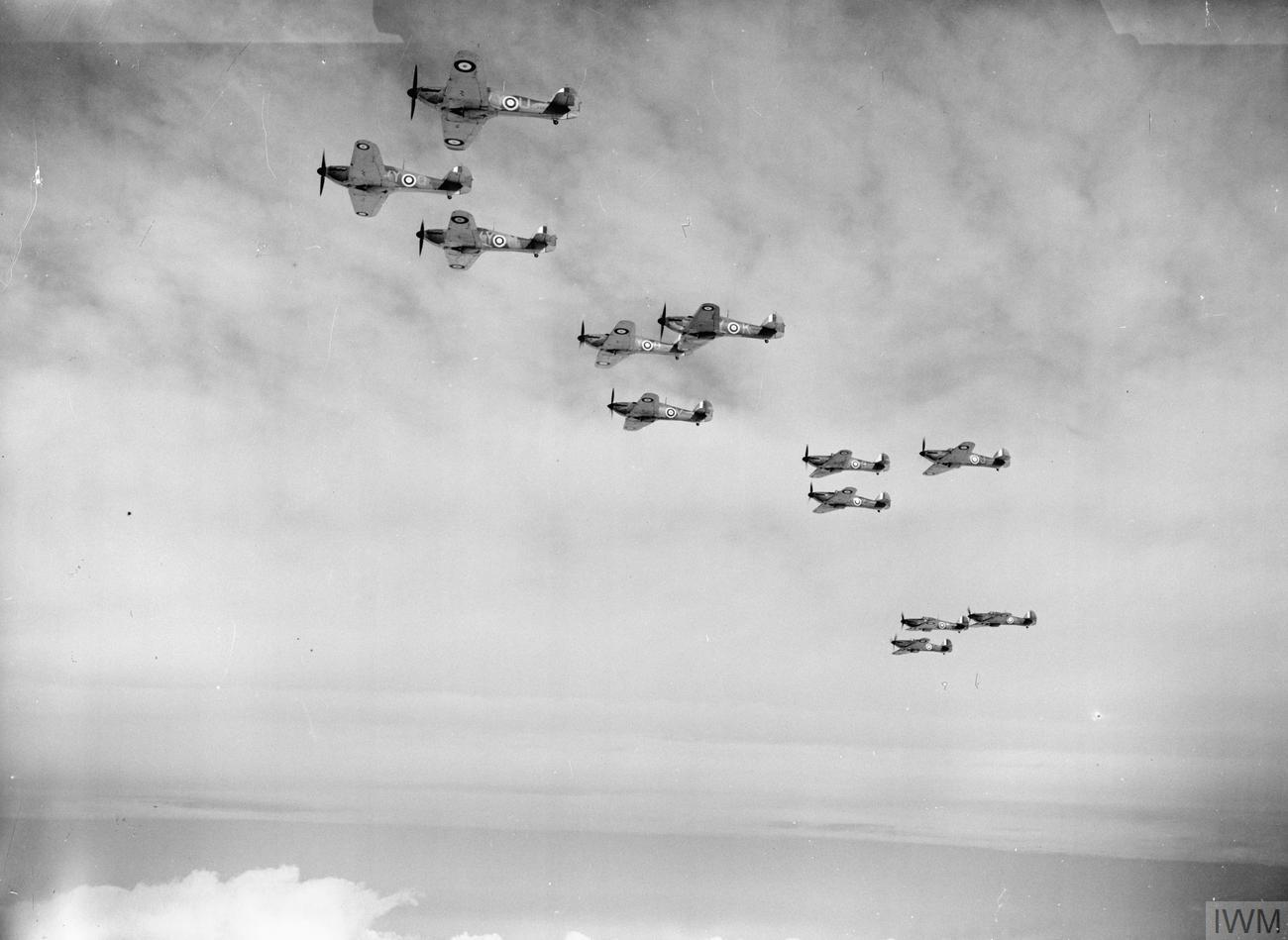
No. 85 Sqdn Hurricanes, October 1940

On 1 June 1938, the squadron was reformed from the renumbered elements of "A" Flight of No. 87 Squadron RAF and placed under the command of Flight Lieutenant D. E. Turner. The squadron was posted to RAF Debden in Essex and commenced training on the Gloster Gladiator (the RAF's last biplane fighter). On 4 September the first Hawker Hurricanes began arriving in numbers. With war looking likely in Europe, No. 85 Squadron received the signal ordering its immediate mobilisation on 23 August 1939, the aircraft making up both "A" and "B" Flights were kept at a state of constant readiness and by 1 September the squadron had completed its preparation for the impending move to France.

On the outbreak of the Second World War, the squadron moved its 16 Hurricanes to Boos as part of the Air Component of the British Expeditionary Force (BEF) 60 Fighter Wing. Their primary role was to give support to the Fairey Battle and Bristol Blenheim units deployed around Rheims and to provide vital air defence cover for their airfields. Initial sorties involved patrols over the English Channel and a move to Merville was instigated in late September. By 1 November 1939, another move saw the squadron posted to Lille Seclin and to maintain its patrols over the Channel, sections were detached to Le Touquet and Saint-Inglevert. During one such patrol over the Boulogne area, the squadron scored its first victory of the war, when Flight Lieutenant R. H. A. Lee attacked a Heinkel He 111 which crashed into the Channel, exploding on impact.

December 1939 saw a Royal visit from his Majesty the King accompanied by the Duke of Gloucester and Viscount Lord Gort. The onset of winter proved to be an additional challenge as bitterly cold weather prevented flying, caused damage to aircraft and took its toll on the health of the airmen, who were living in fairly primitive conditions. When the German invasion (Blitzkrieg) commenced in May 1940, No 85 Squadron found itself locked in a bitter contest with the Luftwaffe, and with attacks on its aerodromes commonplace there was no respite from operations.

In an eleven-day period the squadron accounted for a confirmed total of 90 enemy aircraft; there were many more claims that could not be substantiated. The final sorties saw the squadron giving fighter cover to the Allied armies until its airfields were overrun and the three remaining aircraft returned to the UK. During the intense battles over France, the squadron lost seventeen pilots; two killed, six wounded and nine missing, this figure included their new CO Squadron Leader Peacock but had once again had acquitted itself well in the face of many adversities.

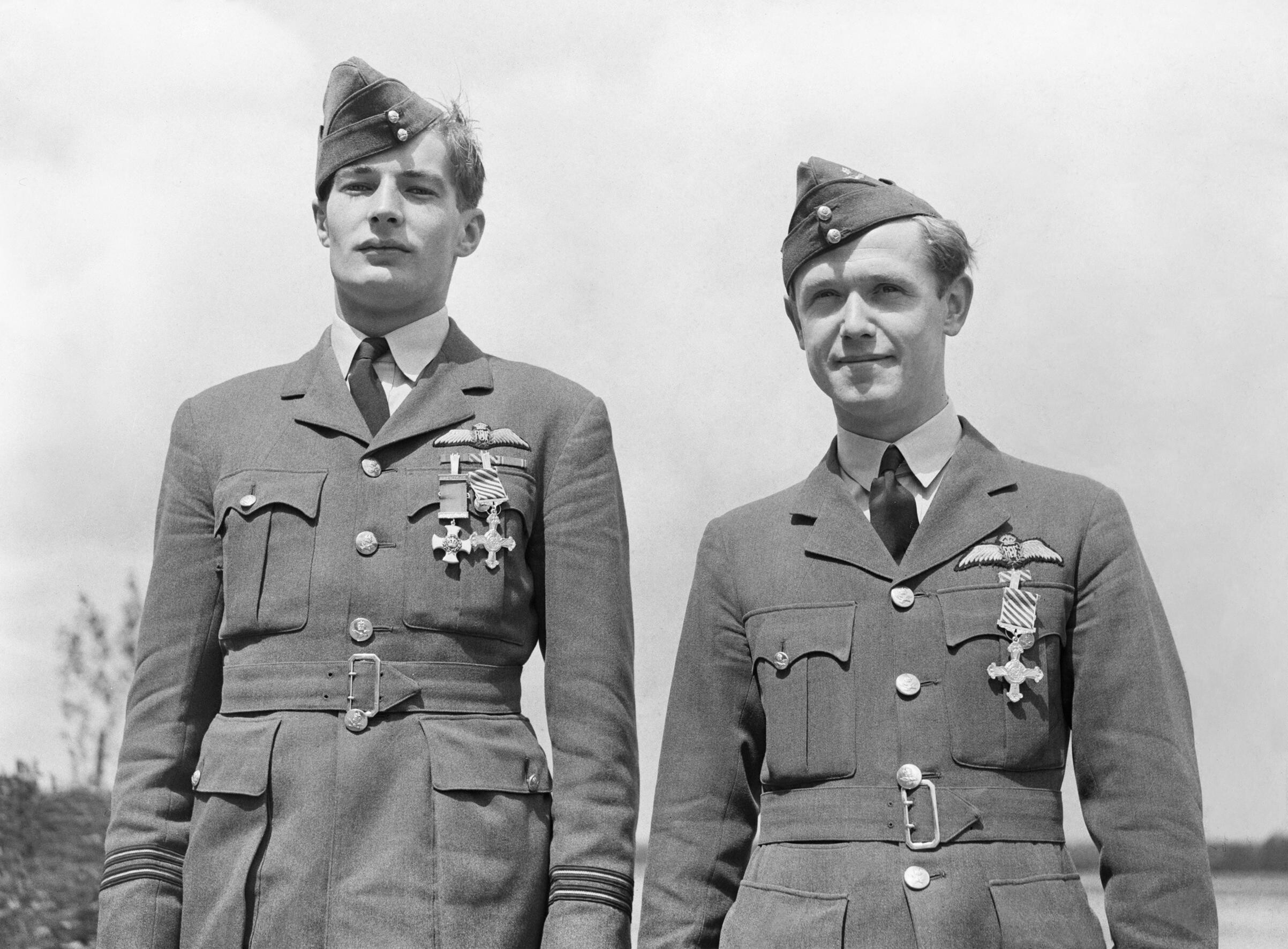
Flight Lieutenant Richard Lee, left, and Flying Officer Kenneth Blair were recognised with gallantry medals for their service with No. 85 Squadron during the Battle of France

The squadron re-equipped and resumed full operations early in June 1940. After taking part in the first half of the Battle of Britain over southern England, the squadron moved to Yorkshire in September and in October following a change in role commenced night fighter patrols. For the remainder of the Second World War No. 85 Squadron continued its nocturnal pursuit of intercepting enemy raiders. It had a brief period providing Bomber Support as part of No. 100 Group RAF and even took part in the famous anti-diver patrols intercepting V1 flying bombs.

=== Entering the jet age ===
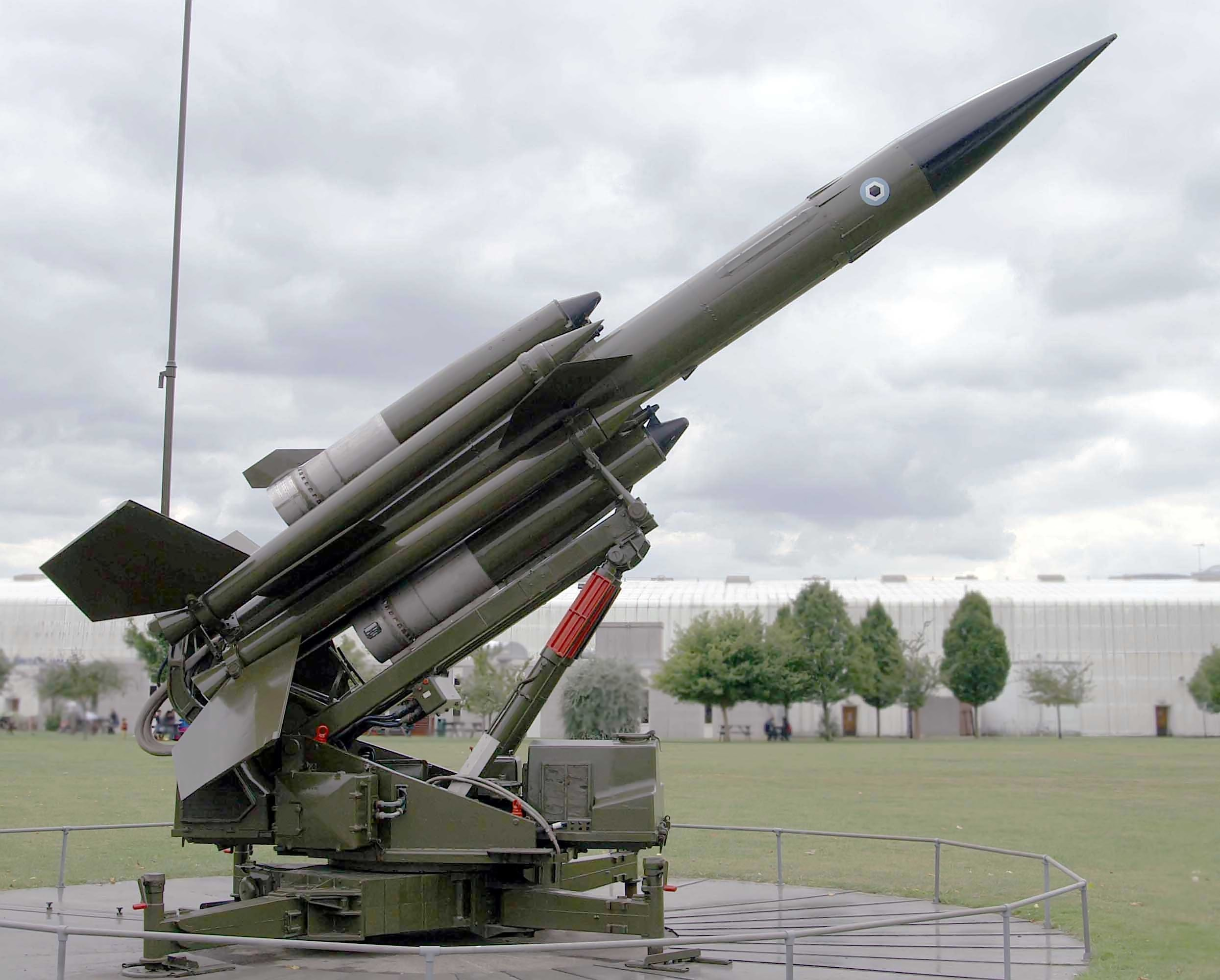
Bloodhound SAM at the RAF Museum, Hendon, London, formerly of No.85 Squadron

Following the end of war in Europe, 85 Squadron remained active as a night-fighter unit, and flying operations continued into the jet age with new aircraft types such as the NF 11 and NF 14 Gloster Meteor, Gloster Javelin and English Electric Canberra. In its final reformation on 19 December 1975, No. 85 Squadron was a Bristol Bloodhound Mark II surface-to-air missile unit. It was operational at several RAF stations in the United Kingdom with headquarters at RAF West Raynham in Norfolk. The squadron continued to play a significant part in Air Defence operations as part of 11 Group RAF Strike Command until the 1990s. The collapse of the Warsaw Pact and the end of the Cold War period heralded wide sweeping changes in the United Kingdom's Air Defence needs. No. 85 Squadron was disbanded on 31 July 1991 and the Standard bearing the squadron's battle honours was interred and is in the safekeeping of Ely Cathedral. At the end the flights of No. 85 were based at the following airfields:

- No. 85 Squadron at RAF West Raynham
  - A Flight at RAF West Raynham
  - B Flight at RAF North Coates
  - C Flight at RAF Bawdsey
  - D Flight at RAF Barkston Heath^{*}
  - E Flight at RAF Wattisham^{*}
  - F Flight at RAF Wyton^{*}

* Joined the squadron after No. 25 Squadron converted to Tornado F3 on 1 August 1989.

2017 marked the 100th Anniversary of No. 85 Squadron, its Association met in June to celebrate the rich history gained throughout the many years of service to the Nation and the Crown. No. 85 Squadron reformed as No 85 (Reserve) Squadron in 2008, located at RAF Church Fenton, teaching Elementary Flying Training in the Grob Tutor. In August 2011, the squadron was disbanded due to the reductions in the RAF and Fleet Air Arm following the 2010 Strategic Defence and Security Review.

Paddy Hemingway, who had served in the squadron, was the last Battle of Britain survivor when he died on 17 March 2025, at the age of 105.

== Commanding officers ==
From	To	Name
Aug 1917	Mar 1918	Maj. R.A. Archer
Mar 1918	Jun 1918	Maj. W.A. Bishop, VC, DSO & Bar, MC, DFC
Jun 1918	Aug 1918	Maj. E. Mannock, VC, DSO and two Bars, MC & Bar
Aug 1918	Jan 1919	Maj. Cyril Crowe
Jan 1919	Feb 1919	Maj. J.O. Leach
Jun 1938	Aug 1938	F/Lt. D.E. Turner
Aug 1938	Nov 1938	F/Lt. A.C.P. Carver
Nov 1938	Jan 1940	S/Ldr. D.F.W. Atcherley
Jan 1940	May 1940	S/Ldr. J.O.W. Oliver, DSO, DFC, CB
May 1940	May 1940	S/Ldr. M. Peacock
May 1940	Jun 1941	S/Ldr. P. Townsend, CVO, DSO, DFC and Bar
Jun 1941	Oct 1941	W/Cdr. A.T.D. Saunders
Nov 1941	May 1942	W/Cdr. R.K. Hamblin
May 1942	Jan 1943	W/Cdr. G.L. Raphael, DFC
Jan 1943	Feb 1944	W/Cdr. J. Cunningham, DSO, DFC
Feb 1944	Oct 1944	W/Cdr. C.M. Miller, DFC
Oct 1944	Jan 1945	W/Cdr. F.S. Gonsalves, DFC
Jan 1945	Jan 1946	W/Cdr. W.K. Davison DSO DFC
Jan 1946	Jan 1946	Sqn Ldr R.H. Farrell DFC
Jan 1946	May 1946	Sqn Ldr A.J. Owen DFC AFC DFM
May 1946	Jan 1947	Sqn Ldr D.C. Furse DFC
Jan 1947	Mar 1948	Sqn Ldr P.F. Allen DFC
Mar 1948	Aug 1948	Sqn Ldr L.W.G. Gill DSO
Aug 1948	Jul 1950	S/Ldr J.R. Gardner
Jul 1950	Sep 1950	Flt Lt A. Hollingworth
Sep 1950	Jan 1952	Sqn Ldr W.A. Griffiths DFC
Jan 1952	May 1954	Sqn Ldr J.D. Hawkins AFC
May 1954	Dec 1955	Sqn Ldr B. Scandrett AFC
Dec 1955	Jan 1958	Wg Cdr A.F. Binks DFC
Jan 1958	Oct 1958	W/Cdr. L.G. Martin
Nov 1958	Mar 1960	W/Cdr. G.A. Martin, DFC, AFC
Mar 1960	Dec 1961	W/Cdr. S.J. Perkins, AFC
Dec 1961	Mar 1963	W/Cdr. D.A.P. Saunders-Davies
Apr 1963	Dec 1063	Sqn Ldr A.C. Warren
Dec 1963	Apr 1966	Sqn Ldr A. French OBE
Apr 1966	Jan 1968	Sqn Ldr J.B. Mountain MBE
Jan 1968	Jan 1969	Sqn Ldr A.G. Topham
Jan 1969	Jan 1971	Wg Cdr J.B. Cowton
Jan 1971	Jan 1973	Wg Cdr I.H. Panton
Jan 1973	Jan 1975	Wg Cdr M.G. King
Jan 1975	Dec 1975	Wg Cdr J.D. Harvey
Dec 1975	Jan 1978	Wg Cdr G.C. Gayton
Jan 1978	Jun 1980	Wg Cdr P.G. Masterman
Jun 1980	Jul 1983	Wg Cdr A.C. Reed
Jul 1983	Nov 1985	Wg Cdr J.B. Thornton
Nov 1985	1988	Wg Cdr J. Sewell
1988	1990	Wg Cdr R.R.Wood
1990	1991	Wg Cdr R.D. Clements
2008	2011	Sqn Ldr A. Paul

== See also ==
- List of Royal Air Force aircraft squadrons
