= Alan Owen (RAF officer) =

British flying ace of WWII

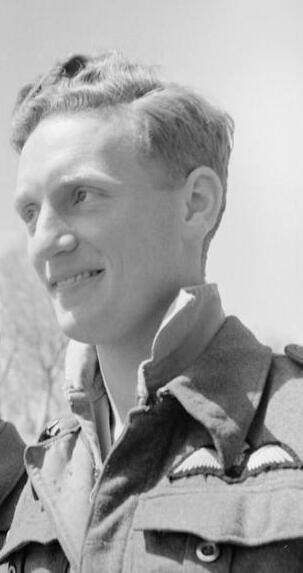
- Born: 8 July 1922; Chelsea, London, England
- Died: 13 February 2010 (aged 87)
- Military career
- Allegiance: United Kingdom
- Branch: Royal Air Force
- Service years: 1941–1946; 1947–1969
- Rank: Wing Commander
- Nickname: 'Red'
- Commands: No. 85 Squadron; No. 39 Squadron; No. 23 Squadron
- Conflicts: Second World War: The Blitz; North African campaign; Cold War: Suez Crisis
- Awards: Distinguished Flying Cross & Bar; Air Force Cross; Distinguished Flying Medal

Alan Owen, DFC & Bar, AFC, DFM (8 July 1922 – 13 February 2010) was a British flying ace who served in the Royal Air Force (RAF) during the Second World War. He is credited with having shot down at least fifteen aircraft.

Born in Chelsea, London, Owen joined the RAF in 1941. After his flying training was completed, he was posted to No. 600 Squadron which operated Bristol Beaufighter heavy fighters in a night fighting role. With Sergeant Vic McAllister as his radar operator, Owen achieved a number of aerial victories while flying in the North African theatre of operations and was awarded the Distinguished Flying Medal. Returned to the United Kingdom in November 1943, he performed instructing duties for several months before being posted to No. 85 Squadron, where he was reunited with McAllister. Still on night fighting duties, the pair flew sorties to German-occupied Europe and Germany, destroying a number of German aircraft. The pair's successes saw them awarded the Distinguished Flying Cross and Bar. After the war, Owen had a brief period in command of the squadron before he left the RAF in 1946.

Owen rejoined the RAF the following year. For the next several years he served in a number of posts, including periods as commander of No. 39 Squadron during the Suez Crisis, and No. 23 Squadron. He retired from the RAF in 1969 as a wing commander. For the next two years, he worked in the Middle East for the British Aircraft Co-operation Commission. Later, back in the United Kingdom, he was employed for two separate county councils in road safety campaigns. In his retirement, he lived in Sussex and was aged 87 at the time of his death in 2010.

== Early life ==
Alan Joseph Owen was born on 8 July 1922 at Chelsea, in London, England. He was educated at St Mary's Church of England School in Merton, subsequently going on to attend Wimbledon Technical College. Once he completed his studies, in technical drawing, he worked for an engineering company in Cheam.

== Second World War ==
In January 1941, Owen joined the Royal Air Force (RAF) in which two of his brothers were already serving. Nicknamed 'Red' on account of his hair colour, once his flight training was completed, he was made a sergeant and proceeded to No. 54 Operational Training Unit (OTU) at Church Fenton. After training for night fighting duties, he was paired with Sergeant Vic McAllister as his radar operator and in May was posted to No. 600 Squadron AAF. This was equipped with the Bristol Beaufighter heavy fighter and operated from Colerne. Although German aircraft had been regularly shot down in the preceding months of The Blitz, from mid-1941 and into the following year, pilots of the squadron were rarely in action.

=== North Africa ===
In November 1942, the unit shifted to North Africa, ferrying its Beaufighters to Blida in Algeria via Gibraltar. The squadron formed part of Algier's air defences and also carried out sorties along the Mediterranean coastline. On the night of 21 December, Owen, still paired with McAllister, destroyed a Heinkel He 111 medium bomber of Kampfgeschwader 26 over Algiers. His Beaufighter received return gun fire from during the engagement and he had to crash land it back at the squadron's airfield. This was the first aerial victory for the squadron since it had relocated from England.

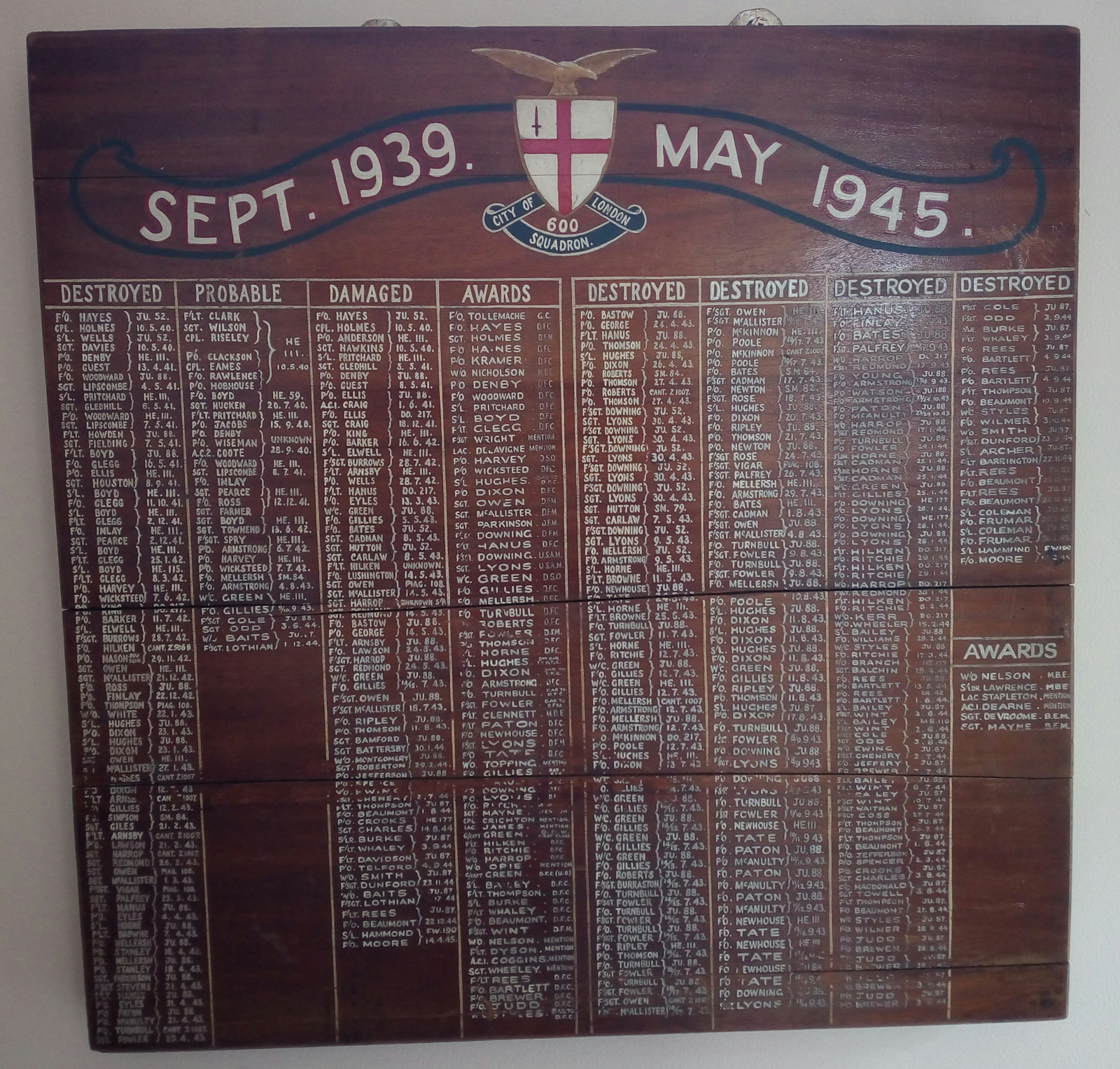
The scoreboard of No. 600 Squadron, showing aerial victories claimed and awards made, including those of Owen, during the Second World War

Owen claimed a second He 111 as destroyed near Philippeville on the night of 26 January 1943, although this was misidentified and was actually a Junkers Ju 88 medium bomber. He shot down a Piaggio P.108 heavy bomber of the Regia Aeronautica (Italian Air Force) around 90 miles (140 km) to the northeast of Bône on 1 March. He was commissioned as a pilot officer soon afterwards. Owen and McAllister's successes to date saw them both awarded the Distinguished Flying Medal. Gazetted on 21 May, the published citation read:

As pilot and observer of aircraft respectively, these airmen have displayed great skill. They have destroyed three enemy aircraft at night.

— London Gazette, No. 36022, 21 May 1943

Another P.108 was damaged by Owen on 13 May, off the Sardinian coast. In a single sortie on the night of 16 July, flying to the east of Augusta, Owen shot down an Italian CANT Z.1007 medium bomber and then destroyed a He 111. Two nights later he damaged a Ju 88 over Caltanissetta. He shot down a Ju 88 on the night of 3 August. This was his last success in the Mediterranean theatre of operations for in November, both Owen and McAllister returned to the United Kingdom. By this time Owen held the rank of flying officer, having been promoted two months previously.

=== Europe ===
For next several months, Owen carried out instructing duties, firstly at No. 63 OTU at Honiley and then No. 53 OTU at Hibaldstow, before being appointed to the Central Gunnery School in January 1944. The following month he was assigned to No. 51 OTU at Cranfield and was seconded to No. 515 Squadron for gunnery training work. He was posted to No. 85 Squadron in August, where he was again paired up with McAllister as his radar operator. His new unit was based at Swannington and, equipped with the de Havilland Mosquito heavy fighter, engaged in Operation Diver, the British campaign against the V-1 flying bombs that Germany was launching at England. Owen destroyed one such V-1 on 5 August.

No. 85 Squadron was soon placed under the control of Bomber Command and switched to bomber support sorties and intruder missions over German-occupied Europe and Germany itself. On the night of 17 September, Owen and McAllister shot down a pair of Messerschmitt Bf 110 heavy fighters. They damaged another Bf 110 on the night of 23 September, also destroying one on the ground. Four nights later, near Kaiserslautern, he claimed a Junkers Ju 188 medium bomber as probably destroyed. Two Ju 88s were shot down by Owen on the nights of 1 and 4 November respectively. On the night of 11 November, he destroyed a Focke Wulf 190 fighter southeast of Hamburg. Owen shot down a Ju 88 near Krefeld on the night of 4 December, which was the squadron's 100th aerial victory. On 22 December, within the space of 30 minutes, he destroyed a Bf 110 and then two Ju 88s, all to the south of Frankfurt. Owen and McAllister were both recognised for their successes up to September with an award of a Distinguished Flying Cross (DFC). The joint award was gazetted on 2 January 1945 and the published citation read:

As pilot and observer respectively these officers have completed very many sorties. They have proved themselves to be highly efficient, courageous and devoted members of aircraft crew, whose keenness to engage the enemy has been most commendable. They have destroyed at least 8 enemy aircraft.

— London Gazette, No. 36873, 2 January 1945

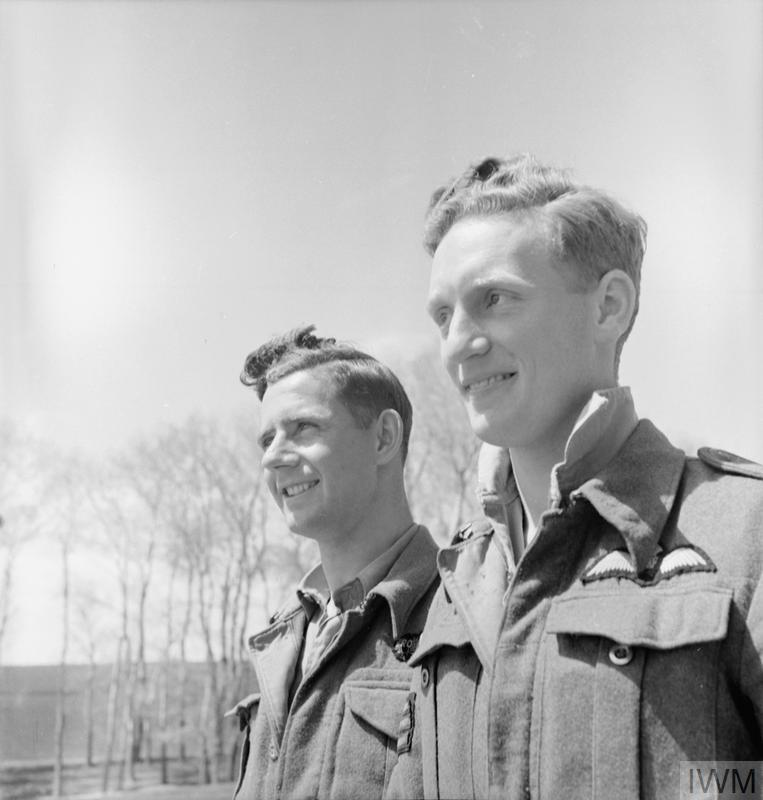
Owen, here on the right, with his radar operator Vic Allister; the pair were responsible for shooting down 15 German and Italian aircraft during the war

The duo's more recent successes was rewarded with a Bar to their DFCs. Gazetted on 9 March, the citation read:

These officers have displayed the highest standard of courage and resolution in air operations. They have completed a large number of sorties during which they have destroyed 15 enemy aircraft, successes which well illustrate their exceptional skill. Fearless and devoted members of aircraft crew, these officers have set an example of a high order.

— London Gazette, No. 36975, 9 March 1945

He, along with McAllister, was promoted to flight lieutenant two days after his Bar was gazetted. No. 85 Squadron relocated back to Colerne after the end of the war and returned to the control of Fighter Command. Owen, promoted to squadron leader, was appointed to command of one of its flights and subsequently the squadron itself until June 1946. His service in the RAF ended shortly afterwards.

== Postwar career ==
Owen rejoined the RAF as a flight lieutenant in July 1947. He was posted to No. 13 Squadron, which was stationed in the Middle East. This was engaged in photo mapping work using Mosquitos. From June 1948 to December 1949 he served at the headquarters of No. 205 Group before taking a role as test pilot for No. 107 Maintenance Unit at RAF Kasfareet. In July 1950 he joined the Central Fighter Establishment (CFE) to work on the development of radar technology.

In late 1952, Owen was posted to No. 96 Squadron. This was a newly reformed squadron based in RAF Ahlhorn, in Germany, which served in a night fighting role using Gloster Meteor jet fighters. Owen had previously flown this type of aircraft while at the CFE. He was promoted to squadron leader the following July. He briefly served at the headquarters of No. 2 Group in August 1956 and then in October, was posted to No. 39 Squadron as its commander. Like his previous squadron, this used Meteors but was stationed in Malta. During the Suez Crisis, the squadron relocated to the airfield at RAF Nicosia on the island of Cyprus but did not engage in any hostile actions. It was ultimately disbanded in late June 1958.

Owen returned to the United Kingdom to serve at the Air Ministry but in November, commenced an advanced flying course. At the completion of this, in June 1959, he went to the School of Land/Air Warfare, based at RAF Old Sarum. As part of the British Army's Southern Command, he served as a liaison officer until November 1961. By this time, he held the rank of wing commander, having been promoted early the previous year. In May 1962, he was appointed commander of No. 23 Squadron. Equipped with the Gloster Javelin jet fighter, this was another night fighter squadron and was based at Coltishall. He played a role in the introduction of in-flight refueling to RAF operations, leading a section of Javelins that benefited from this technique on a non-stop flight to Aden in October. Taking 8 hours, 50 minutes, this was the longest flight undertaken by Fighter Command aircraft. He led the squadron in making another long-haul flight, aided with in-flight refueling, this time to Singapore but with stops at RAF bases in Cyprus, the Middle East and India. Owen was awarded the Air Force Cross in the 1964 New Year Honours.

Ceding command of No. 23 Squadron in October 1964, Owen was sent to the Ministry of Defence in a staff role, working on fighter operations. Two years later he was assigned to the Sector Ops Centre in Jever, Germany. He retired from the RAF in July 1969, still holding the rank of wing commander.

== Later life ==
In civilian life Owen continued to work in aviation for a time, returning to the Middle East for two years while serving on the British Aircraft Co-operation Commission. Once back in the United Kingdom, he was active in road safety on behalf of the East Sussex County Council and then Kent County Council. He retired in 1984, later living in Sussex. He died on 13 February 2010, survived by his wife of 65 years, Rita Drew, and the couple's six children. He is credited with having shot down fifteen aircraft, one V-1 flying bomb, and damaged three more. He is also credited with the probable destruction of one aircraft.
