= William Molesworth (British Army officer) =

British World War I flying ace (1894–1955)

William Earle Molesworth
- Born: 14 March 1894; Andaman Islands, India
- Died: 22 October 1955 (aged 61); Reading, Berkshire, England
- Burial place: Henley Road Cemetery, Reading, Berkshire, England; 51°28′33″N 0°57′16″W
- Military career
- Allegiance: United Kingdom
- Branch: British Army; Royal Air Force
- Service years: 1914–1941
- Rank: Lieutenant Colonel
- Nickname: "-Moley"
- Service number: 8675
- Units: Royal Munster Fusiliers; Royal Flying Corps; Royal Sussex Regiment; Royal Tank Corps/Regiment
- Commands: No. 158 Squadron RAF
- Conflicts: World War I • Western Front; World War II
- Awards: Military Cross & Bar; Silver Medal of Military Valor (Italy)

Lieutenant Colonel William Earle Molesworth MC & Bar (14 March 1894 – 22 October 1955) was a British First World War flying ace credited with eighteen aerial victories.

== Biography ==
Molesworth was born on 14 March 1894, the son of Lieutenant Colonel William Molesworth CBE, CIE, of the Indian Medical Service, and Winifred Anne Weeks.

He attended Marlborough College from 1908 to 1912, then trained for an army career at the Royal Military College at Sandhurst, from 1912 to 1914. On 8 August 1914, four days after Britain entered the First World War, he was commissioned as a second lieutenant into the Royal Munster Fusiliers.

From October 1914 Molesworth served in the trenches on the Western Front in France. He was promoted to lieutenant on 15 November 1914, later backdated to 30 August 1914. He was wounded in December, but returned to duty and served with the Fusiliers until March 1916.

Molesworth was then seconded to the Royal Flying Corps, and was appointed a flying officer on 26 December 1916, finally completing his flight training at Upavon's Central Flying School in February 1917. He received promotion to captain in the Royal Munster Fusiliers on 7 April 1917. He was assigned to No. 60 Squadron RFC (60 Sqn), flying Nieuport 17s, and scored his first victory on 22 April. On 26 April was appointed a flight commander with the temporary rank of captain, to lead "A" Flight. His next three triumphs were also scored flying a Nieuport; then he switched to an SE.5a for his next two in early August. He was transferred to the Home Establishment in England, and on 26 September 1917 he was awarded his first Military Cross (MC).

On 20 October 1917, he returned to flying Nieuports when assigned to No. 29 Squadron RFC (29 Sqn) as a captain. He gained his first victories with them on 8 November 1917, setting an enemy reconnaissance two-seater and an Albatros D.V on fire. He then scored at a steady rate until his eighteenth and last victory on 18 March 1918. On 26 March 1918 he was awarded a bar to his MC.

He served as an instructor, with the temporary rank of major, at the Central Flying School between 26 June and 4 September 1918. He retained his temporary majority when appointed commander of No. 158 Squadron RAF on 3 September 1918. On 12 September, just two months before the armistice of 11 November 1918 which ended the war, he was awarded the Medaglia d'Argento al Valore Militare (Silver Medal of Military Valor) by Italy. He gave up command of his squadron and on 15 October 1919 relinquished his commission on ceasing to be employed, being restored to the establishment of the Royal Munster Fusiliers.

The Royal Munster Fusiliers were disbanded on 31 July 1922, and Molesworth was serving as a Railway Traffic Officer, when on 13 September 1922 he was appointed a captain in the Royal Sussex Regiment, with seniority from 7 April 1917. On 13 February 1924 he was transferred to the Royal Tank Corps (later the Royal Tank Regiment), where he was promoted to the substantive rank of major on 28 February 1931.

He continued his military service into the Second World War, which began in September 1939, and was promoted to lieutenant colonel on 1 April 1940, before retiring from the army on 13 September 1941. He then worked at the Ministry of Supply, until his retirement in 1954.

== Personal life ==
Molesworth married Dorothy Loftus Steele, the daughter of Colonel St. George Loftus Steele, on 1 June 1918. They had a daughter Pamela, born on 14 March 1919.

Molesworth died on 22 October 1955 in Reading, Berkshire, and was buried at Henley Road Cemetery on 25 October.

== Awards and citations ==
Military Cross

Captain William Earle Molesworth, Royal Munster Fusiliers and Royal Flying Corps.
For conspicuous gallantry and devotion to duty on offensive patrol. He has frequently led his patrol against superior numbers of the enemy, destroying some and dispersing others. He has also brought down two balloons and has proved himself to be a dashing and fearless pilot of great skill and determination.

Bar to the Military Cross

Captain William Earle Molesworth, MC, Royal Munster Fusiliers and Royal Flying Corps.
For conspicuous gallantry and devotion to duty. He has done excellent work as patrol leader, handling his formations with great skill and courage. He has destroyed four enemy machines and driven several down out of control.

== List of aerial victories ==
Combat record
| No. | Date/ Time | Aircraft/ Serial No. | Opponent | Result | Location | Notes |
With No. 60 Squadron RFC
| 1 | 22 April 1917 @1720 | Nieuport 17 (B1569) | Albatros D.III | Driven down out of control | Vitry | |
| 2 | 24 April 1917 @1040 | Nieuport 17 (B1569) | Balloon | Destroyed | Boiry-Notre-Dame | |
| 3 | 29 June 1917 @1800 | Nieuport 17 (B1652) | Albatros D.III | Destroyed | Douai—Estrées | |
| 4 | 11 July 1917 @1410 | Nieuport 17 (B1652) | Albatros D.III | Driven down out of control | Quéant | |
| 5 | 5 August 1917 @2000 | SE.5a (A4851) | Albatros D.III | Destroyed (on fire) | Hendecourt | Shared with Lieutenant Spencer B. Horn |
| 6 | 9 August 1917 @0700 | S.E.5a (A8932) | Albatros D.V | Destroyed | Cagnicourt | |
With No. 29 Squadron RFC
| 7 | 8 November 1917 @1515 | Nieuport 17 (B6812) | Albatros D.V | Destroyed (on fire) | East of Westrozebeke | |
| 8 | 8 November 1917 @1600 | Nieuport 17 (B6812) | C | Destroyed (on fire) | Houthulst Forest | |
| 9 | 26 November 1917 @1450 | Nieuport 17 (B6820) | Albatros D.V | Driven down out of control | South-east of Houthulst | |
| 10 | 3 January 1918 @1530 | Nieuport 17 (B6812) | Albatros D.V | Driven down out of control | South of Moorslede | |
| 11 | 22 January 1918 @1235 | Nieuport 17 (B6812) | Albatros D.V | Destroyed | North-east of Staden | |
| 12 | 24 January 1918 @1200 | Nieuport 17 (B6812) | C | Destroyed | North-east of Roulers | |
| 13 | 24 January 1918 @1310 | Nieuport 17 (B6812) | C | Destroyed | North of Roulers | |
| 14 | 29 January 1918 @1255 | Nieuport 17 (B6797) | Albatros D.V | Destroyed (on fire) | East of Moorslede | |
| 15 | 5 February 1918 @1020 | Nieuport 17 (B6812) | C | Driven down out of control | Moorslede—Roulers | |
| 16 | 21 February 1918 @1410 | Nieuport 17 (B6812) | C | Captured | Ypres—Zonnebeke | |
| 17 | 26 February 1918 @1100 | Nieuport 17 (B6812) | C | Destroyed | South-east of Beselare | |
| 18 | 18 March 1918 @1145 | Nieuport 17 (B6812) | Pfalz D.III | Destroyed | South-east of Rumbeke | |
