= Alexander Beck (RAF officer) =

Anglo-Argentine flying ace

- Born: 3 November 1899; Argentina
- Died: 4 January 1989 (aged 89)
- Military career
- Allegiance: United Kingdom
- Branch: Royal Flying Corps
- Service years: 1917–1919
- Rank: Captain
- Unit: No. 60 Squadron RAF
- Awards: Distinguished Flying Cross

Captain Alexander Beck DFC (3 November 1899 – 4 January 1989) was an Anglo-Argentine aviator during World War I. He was an underage enlistee who went on to become a flying ace credited with 11 official aerial victories.

== Early life ==
Beck's parents had emigrated to Argentina from Cumbria. He was so keen to serve in British uniform that he lied his way into the Royal Flying Corps while still underage. As he was born on 3 November 1899, his graduation from pilot training in July 1917 saw him pitched into battle four months before his "legal" 18th birthday.

== World War I ==
On 21 June 1917 temporary Second Lieutenant A. Beck was appointed a Flying Officer in the Royal Flying Corps. His seniority of rank was then back-dated to 1 June 1916. He then flew 13 combat patrols with 60 Squadron before his parents apprised the RFC of his true age. Once it was known he was younger than 18 years old, he was withdrawn from both combat duty and France.

He returned to 60 Squadron in March 1918, and scored his first win in August; flying a Royal Aircraft Factory SE.5a, he destroyed a German Fokker D.VII fighter plane on the 8th. He followed this up by destroying a Hannover reconnaissance plane over Riencourt in the early morning of 14 August, and an Albatros over Guemappe in mid-morning. On 31 August, he shared in the destruction of an LVG two-seater recon plane over Inchy.

On 28 September 1918, he destroyed another LVG two-seater over Cambrai to become an ace. Then, in October 1918, he scored five more times: a Fokker D.VII out of control over Esnes on the 3rd; an LVG captured at Bohain-en-Vermandois on the 9th; a Halberstadt recon plane captured on the 22nd at Orvillers-Sorel; a share in an LVG destroyed over Le Quesnoy on the 26th; and another Fokker D.VII out of control over Mormal on the 29th.

On 1 November, he helped shoot down yet another Fokker D.VII over Mormal Woods for his and his squadron's final victory.

== Distinguished Flying Cross ==
He won a Distinguished Flying Cross, gazette 3 December 1918. The accompanying award citation read:

Lieutenant (Acting-Captain) Alexander Beck.
A bold and skilful leader, who has himself shot down four enemy aeroplanes. His personal courage and able leadership have had a marked influence in maintaining the efficiency of the squadron.

== See also ==
- Thomas Traill
- Kenneth Charney, Argentine Second World War RAF ace
