= James Belgrave =

British World War I flying ace (1896–1918)

James Dacres Belgrave
- Born: 27 September 1896; Kensington, London, England
- Died: 13 June 1918 (aged 21) near Albert, France
- Burial place: Grove Town Cemetery, Meaulte, France
- Relatives: Sir Charles Belgrave (brother); Rear-Admiral James Richard Dacres (great-grandfather); General Sir Hew Dalrymple (great-great-grandfather)
- Military career
- Allegiance: United Kingdom
- Branch: British Army; Royal Air Force
- Service years: 1914–1918
- Rank: Captain
- Units: Oxfordshire and Buckinghamshire Light Infantry; No. 45 Squadron RFC; No. 61 Squadron RAF; No. 60 Squadron RAF
- Conflicts: World War I
- Awards: Military Cross and Bar

Captain James Dacres Belgrave MC* (27 September 1896 – 13 June 1918) was a British World War I flying ace credited with 18 aerial victories.

== Family background ==
James Dacres Belgrave was born in Kensington, London, the second son of the barrister and writer Dalrymple James Belgrave and his wife Isabella Richardson. His older brother, Sir Charles Dalrymple Belgrave, also served in the Army during the First World War, and was later advisor to the rulers of Bahrain from 1926 until 1957. His grandfather was Commander Thomas Belgrave, RN, of Kilworth, Leicester, who had married Charlotte, the daughter of Rear-Admiral James Richard Dacres, who had in turn married Arabella Boyd, daughter of General Sir Hew Dalrymple.

== Military service ==
Belgrave attended the Royal Military College, Sandhurst, and was commissioned as a second lieutenant in the Oxfordshire and Buckinghamshire Light Infantry on 16 December 1914. He was wounded in action in November 1915, and was promoted to Lieutenant on 13 February 1916.

On 27 October 1916 he was seconded to the Royal Flying Corps, serving in 45 Squadron, flying the Sopwith 1½ Strutter. He shot down six enemy aircraft between February and May 1917.

On 18 July 1917 he was awarded the Military Cross. His citation read:

Lieutenant James Dacres Belgrave, Oxfordshire & Buckinghamshire Light Infantry and Royal Flying Corps.
For conspicuous gallantry and devotion to duty. On at least five occasions he successfully engaged and shot down hostile aeroplanes, and has consistently shown great courage and determination to get to the closest range; an invaluable example in a fighting squadron.

On 1 September 1917 he was appointed flight commander with the temporary rank of Captain. After serving in 61 Squadron on Home Defence duties, he returned to France in April 1918 to serve in 60 Squadron, and flying the S.E.5a he shot down twelve more aircraft in May and June, bringing his total up to 18.

Belgrave was killed in action about four miles east of Albert on 13 June 1918, and is buried at the Grove Town Cemetery in Méaulte, Somme.

The bar to his Military Cross was gazetted in September 1918, three months after his death. The citation read:

Lieutenant (Temporary Captain) James Dacres Belgrave, MC, Oxfordshire & Buckinghamshire Light Infantry, attached Royal Air Force.
For conspicuous gallantry and devotion to duty whilst leading offensive patrols. In four days he destroyed two enemy machines and drove down four others. The odds were heavy against him, and he did magnificent work.
