= John Doyle (RAF officer) =

British World War 1 pilot

John Edgcumbe Doyle
- Doyle with an Avro mono
- Born: 18 April 1893; Wynberg, Cape Colony
- Died: 24 November 1974 (aged 81); Devon, England
- Military career
- Allegiance: United Kingdom
- Branch: British Army; Royal Air Force
- Service years: 1914–1918; 1941–1943
- Rank: Captain
- Units: Army Service Corps; No. 56 Squadron; No. 60 Squadron
- Conflicts: First World War • Western Front; Second World War
- Awards: Distinguished Flying Cross

John Edgcumbe Doyle DFC (18 April 1895 – 24 November 1974) was a British First World War flying ace credited with nine confirmed victories. He was shot down on 6 September 1918 and taken prisoner and his right leg was amputated. He was repatriated on 20 December 1918 and invalided out of the RAF.

== Early life ==
John Doyle was born in Cape Colony where his father was the chaplain to the Governor of Cape Province. He was employed at the Bank of South Africa for two years but left in mid-1914 because he saw a recruiting advertisement for the Royal Naval Air Service. He was not taken due to a lack of trigonometry and then, since the war had started on 4 August, he applied to the Royal Flying Corps where he was told the war would be over by Christmas and anyway they had plenty of applicants. He then joined the Inns of Court Officers' Training Corps as a cavalry officer candidate. He was commissioned as a temporary second lieutenant in the Army Service Corps on 24 May 1915.

== First World War ==
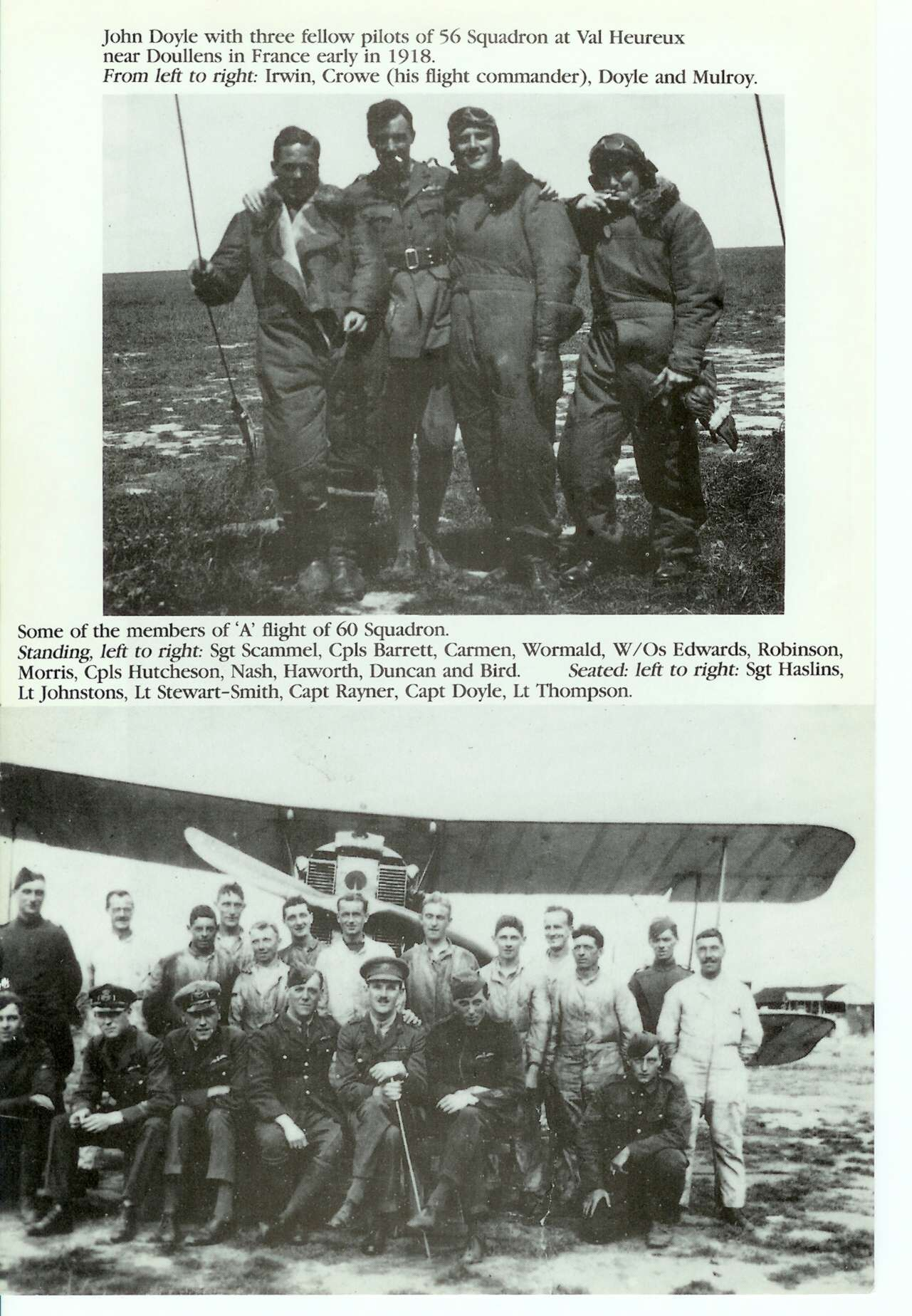
56 and 60 Squadron

Once in France in mid-1915, Doyle frequently applied to join the RFC, but was always told by his commanding officer that he was essential to the ASC. By 1916, when the RFC was very short of candidates and commanding officers were no longer allowed to stop transfers, he joined the RFC in England.

Doyle was appointed a flying officer on 22 February 1917 and transferred to the General List. Training was haphazard at RAF Doncaster and he flew the Maurice Farman Shorthorn, Avro 504, B.E.2c, B.E.12 and Armstrong Whitworth F.K.8. The "Wings" test had four components; a climb to 10,000 feet then an engine out descent to landing, a cross-country with landings at two other airfields, two airborne photos of navigational landmarks and two night landings. Having passed, he was asked to fetch a new type of aircraft from the Daimler Works at Coventry, an R.E.8. He crashed on takeoff, as all previous 12 aircraft had done, since there was not enough yaw control to counter the P-factor and keep the aircraft with its powerful V-12 engine straight. He was badly concussed and the aircraft withdrawn for redesign of the vertical stabiliser and rudder. After recovery and convalescence at Osborne, he was sent to 40 Squadron at Port Meadow, Oxford, to fly Nieuports but was soon sent to a medical board that classified him as "Light Duty – No Flying" (LD).

Repatriated 20 December 1918

Doyle was promoted to lieutenant on 1 July 1917.

After waiting at Oxford with several other LD officers, they were all sent to Hounslow where one "booked in" by writing one's classification in a book on arrival. He found that his medical records had not preceded him and booked in as "General Service" (GS) and so could fly. After 11 hours flying, a new medical board again classified him as LD, but he was soon transferred to Harling Road where he again signed in as GS and was made an instructor, eventually being certified by Gosport. He was called before another medical board and was asked what he was complaining of, he said "nothing" and was at last classed GS.

He finally reached a fighter squadron in March 1918, 18 months after joining the RFC and Major Balcomb-Brown noticing his very unusual many hours of flying picked him for No. 56 Squadron where he joined 'B' Flight commanded by Captain Cyril Crowe. He had no confirmed victories with 56 Squadron, but must have done well since, after two weeks, he was leading patrols and before long was promoted to captain.

After Major McCudden, commanding officer of No. 60 Squadron, was killed, Crowe became CO of the squadron on 9 July and asked Doyle to join him as 'A' Flight commander. On 30 July, Crowe was in a car crash that killed Captain Owen Scholte, the senior flight commander of 60 Squadron, and so Doyle became acting commander of the squadron. After a few weeks, Major Clarke, from Harling Road, arrived as CO although he had never been seen to fly there nor at the squadron; he was, however, an Old Etonian.

In the few weeks that he was in combat in 60 Squadron (he was not allowed to cross the lines while CO), he had nine confirmed victories and two balloons that are not recorded for some reason. He was shot down on 5 September after destroying two Albatros D.VIIs himself. His last flight was just before he was to go on home leave, by the end of which the war would be over. He was taken prisoner and his right leg, which had become gangrenous from a bullet wound in his ankle, was amputated at the upper thigh. He was repatriated on 20 December 1918 to the Prince of Wales Hospital for Officers in Marylebone. He received the Distinguished Flying Cross from King George V in May 1919. Doyle was eventually invalided out of the RAF, being transferred to unemployed list on 12 November 1919.

== After the war ==

As a one-legged ex-pilot with minimal formal education, the post-war years were extremely difficult and he had many different low-paying jobs including driving a tour bus from Exeter, where he met his wife, Grace Burd, daughter of an Okehampton doctor. In the mid-1930s, he wrote 31 flying adventure stories for such magazines as Air Stories, The Scout, Popular Flying, The Aeroplane, Flying, Boys' Ace Library, Mine, Modern Wonder and War Stories, and technical articles for Popular Flying. Never having lost his love of aircraft and flying, he regained his pilot's licence, #3236, in 1930 able to fly "all types of landplanes".

In addition to his autobiography, published privately, he wrote two books. Skies Unknown was published by Wright & Brown in 1939 but most copies were burned in a warehouse fire caused by a German bombing raid on London. The second, Castle Cumulus, a children's book concerned with flying and meteorology, never received interest from a publisher but 20 copies were printed for family members.

His distinguished service to the Crown enabled him to gain a place for his son at Christ's Hospital under the Clause 100 programme.

In 1940, he was hired as a civilian Link Trainer instructor and wrote most of the instructor's manual for the device. He joined the Royal Air Force Volunteer Reserve on 12 August 1941; his first CO remarked that he must be the only acting pilot officer on probation with a DFC in the RAF. He was promoted to flying officer on 1 October 1942, and was a Chief Ground Instructor at bomber stations throughout the UK. He wrote in his autobiography that "on becoming a Link instructor my financial state ceased to be a source of constant worry ... and I was never again financially embarrassed to any serious extent".

Doyle resigned his commission on 21 April 1943, retaining the rank of flight lieutenant, and kept two pubs in England before retiring to Kyrenia, Cyprus, in 1953. There he took up painting and had a well-received one-man show in 1959. As the Greek-Turkish conflict intensified, he and his wife returned to England, finally living in the home of her mother-in-law in Devon with one of their daughters. Doyle painted and wrote his autobiography and died in 1974, three weeks after his wife's death.
