= Fampoux =

- Commune
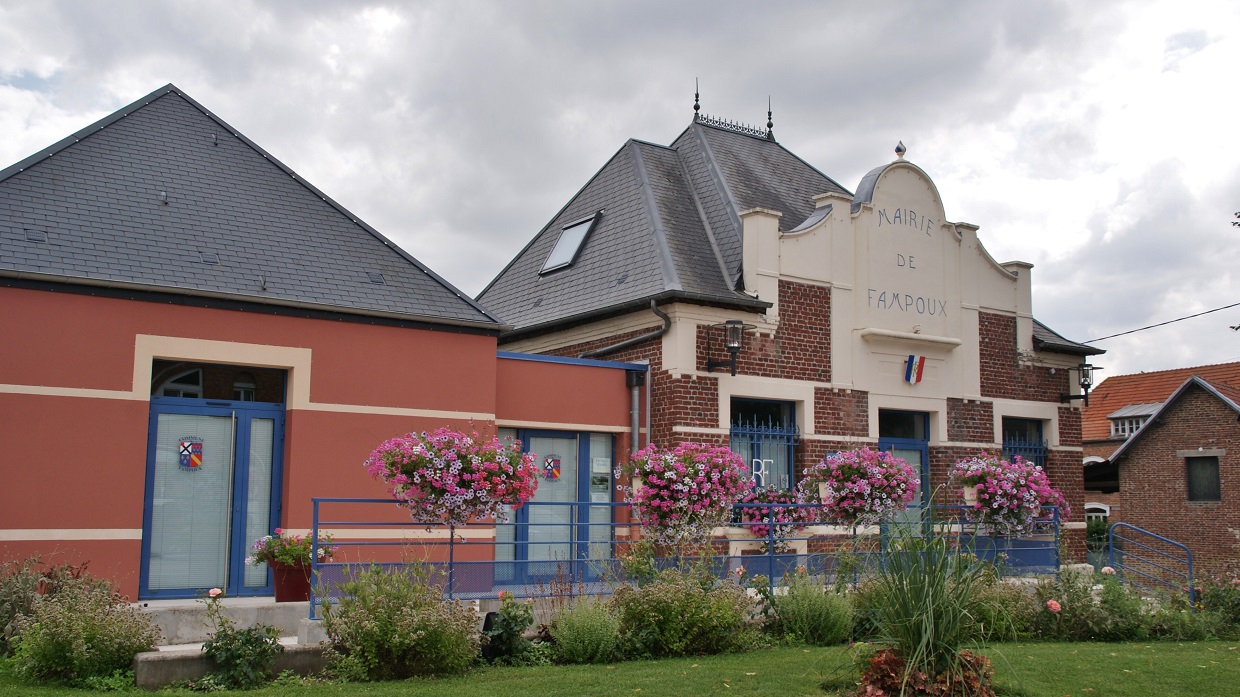
- The town hall of Fampoux

- Coat of arms
- Location of Fampoux
- Location within France Location within Hauts-de-France
- Coordinates: 50°18′10″N 2°52′21″E
- Country: France
- Region: Hauts-de-France
- Department: Pas-de-Calais
- Arrondissement: Arras
- Canton: Arras-2
- Intercommunality: CU Arras

Government
  - Mayor (2020–2026): Didier Ledhé
- Area^{1}: 8.64 km^{2} (3.34 sq mi)
- Elevation: 67 m (220 ft)
- Highest elevation: 102 m (335 ft)
- Lowest elevation: 45 m (148 ft)
- Population (2023): 1,267
  - Density: 147/km^{2} (380/sq mi)
- Time zone: UTC+01:00 (CET)
  - Summer (DST): UTC+02:00 (CEST)
- INSEE/Postal code: 62323 /62118
- ^{1} French Land Register data, which excludes lakes, ponds, glaciers > 1 km^{2} (0.386 sq mi or 247 acres) and river estuaries.

Fampoux (French pronunciation: [fɑ̃pu]) is a commune in the Pas-de-Calais department in the Hauts-de-France region of France 4 miles (6 km) east of Arras.

== Population ==
Historical population
Year	Pop.	±% p.a.
1968	946	—
1975	1,199	+3.44%
1982	1,123	−0.93%
1990	1,016	−1.24%
1999	1,071	+0.59%
2007	1,090	+0.22%
2012	1,140	+0.90%
2017	1,181	+0.71%
2023	1,267	+1.18%
Source: INSEE

== Notable people ==
- Paul Verlaine, poet spent his holidays there for several years, as his mother's family were from Fampoux. A street and the village school bear his name.

== See also ==
- Communes of the Pas-de-Calais department
