= McCudden =

McCudden is a surname. Notable people with the surname include:

- James McCudden (1895–1918), British World War I flying ace
- Jenny McCudden, Irish journalist, newspaper editor, author, and television producer
- John McCudden (1897–1918), British World War I flying ace, brother of James
