= James McCudden =

British World war I flying ace (1895–1918)

James Thomas Byford McCudden
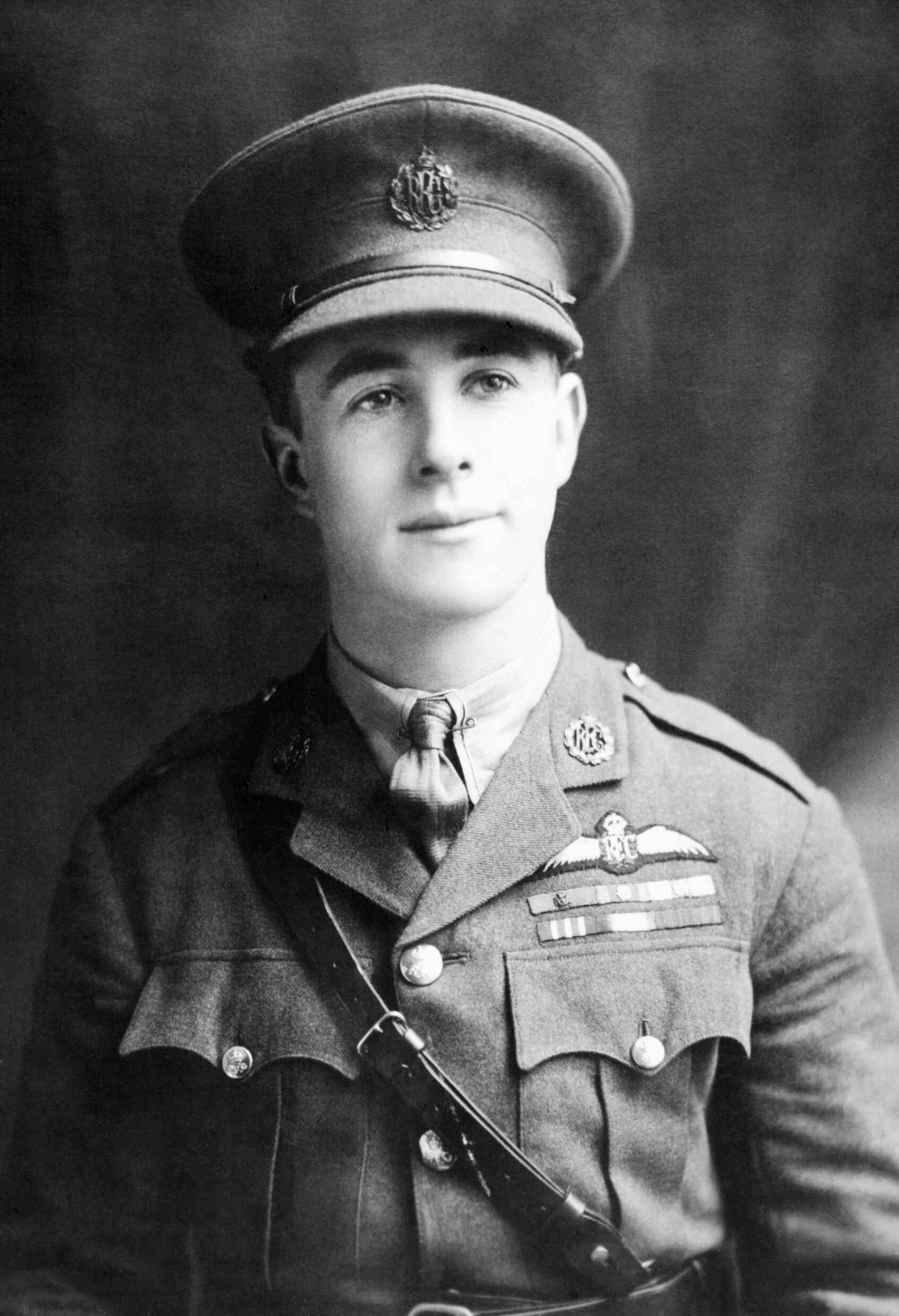
- McCudden in c. 1918
- Born: 28 March 1895; Gillingham, Kent, England
- Died: 9 July 1918 (aged 23); Auxi-le-Château, France
- Burial place: Wavans British Cemetery
- Relatives: John McCudden (brother)
- Military career
- Allegiance: United Kingdom
- Branch: British Army (1910–18); Royal Air Force (1918)
- Service years: 1910–18
- Rank: Major
- Nickname: "Mac"
- Unit: No. 56 Squadron RAF
- Conflicts: First World War; Western Front
- Awards: Victoria Cross; Distinguished Service Order & Bar; Military Cross & Bar; Military Medal; Croix de Guerre (France)

James Thomas Byford McCudden, VC, DSO & Bar, MC & Bar, MM (28 March 1895 – 9 July 1918) was an English flying ace of the First World War and among the most highly decorated airmen in British military history. Born in 1895 to a middle class family with military traditions, McCudden joined the Royal Engineers in 1910. Having an interest in mechanics he transferred to the Royal Flying Corps (RFC) in 1913 at which time he first came into regular contact with aircraft. At the outbreak of war in 1914 he flew as an observer before training as a fighter pilot in 1916.

McCudden claimed his first victory in September 1916 flying the Airco DH.2. He claimed his fifth victory—making him an ace—on 15 February 1917. For the next six months he served as an instructor and flew defensive patrols over London. He returned to the frontline in summer 1917 flying the S.E.5a. That same year he dispatched a further 31 enemy aircraft while claiming multiple victories in one day on 11 occasions. With his six British medals and one French, McCudden received more awards for gallantry than any other airman of British nationality serving in the First World War. He was also one of the longest serving. By 1918, in part due to a campaign by the Daily Mail newspaper, McCudden became one of the most famous airmen in the British Isles.

At the time of his death, he had achieved 57 aerial victories, placing him seventh on the list of the war's most successful aces. Just under two-thirds of his victims can be identified by name. (Note: Norman Franks has researched and compiled the list of air victories for McCudden. His contribution is published in the 1987 edition of James McCudden's Flying Fury.) This is possible since, unlike other Allied aces, a substantial proportion of McCudden's claims were made over Allied-held territory. The majority of his successes were achieved with 56 Squadron RFC and all but five were shot down while McCudden was flying the S.E.5a. On 9 July 1918, McCudden was killed in a flying accident when his aircraft crashed on takeoff due to engine failure. His rank at the time of his death was major, a significant achievement for a man who had begun his career in the RFC as an air mechanic. McCudden is buried at the British war cemetery at Beauvoir-Wavans.

== Early life and family ==
James McCudden was born in Gillingham, Kent, to Sergeant-Major William H. McCudden and Amelia Byford. His father had been in the military for most of his life. He joined the Royal Engineers as a teenager and served in No. 24 Company. William McCudden fought in the Anglo-Egyptian War at the Battle of Tel el-Kebir in 1882. During combat he rescued a wounded soldier while under fire and was recommended for an award. However, when it emerged he was acting against orders he was denied any honours. Nevertheless, William had a long career in the Engineers and eventually became an instructor at the School of Military Engineering as a non-commissioned officer. His mother's family also had a military background; her grandfather served as a Master-at-arms in the Royal Marines aboard HMS Poictiers.

In 1890 William H. McCudden and Amelia Byford (1869–1955) married. They had six children; William Thomas James (3 April 1891 – 1 May 1915), Mary Amelia (23 January 1893), James Thomas Byford (28 March 1895 – 9 July 1918), Kathleen Annie (1 December 1899), John Anthony (14 June 1897 – 18 March 1918) and Maurice Vincent (31 October 1901 – 13 December 1934). William and John McCudden also became fighter pilots but both were killed during the war. William died in a flying accident while instructing on 13 Squadron at Gosport and John was killed in action on 84 Squadron in France.

His father William H. McCudden took a post at the Air Ministry at the rank of warrant officer after the Great War, but would die tragically at Clapham Junction railway station on 7 July 1920. When he stood up to offer a woman his seat the compartment door flew open, knocking him into the path of an oncoming train. Maurice Vincent became a pilot and served in the Royal Air Force (RAF) until he retired through illness in 1933. He died of colitis the following year, leaving a widow and small daughter.

The McCuddens moved to Sheerness in 1909 and James transferred to the garrison school. He learned to shoot at the rifle range, box and was a reasonably intelligent student. His father's retirement soon placed a heavy strain on the family finances and as a consequence McCudden felt obliged to find a job before he could enlist once he turned 15. He filled the time from the age of 14 to the age of enlistment by working as a Post Office messenger boy. It was at this time McCudden's interest in flying began. In nearby Leysdown, on the Isle of Sheppey, one of the first aviation centres was built. It was here John Moore-Brabazon became the first Englishman to fly. McCudden and his brothers often went to see the pioneer aviators gather. McCudden expressed a desire to become a pilot after spending hours watching these early flying machines.

== Royal Engineers and RFC ==
Unfortunately his desire to be a pilot was postponed. The family required further income after his father retired. Unable to wait for that opportunity to arise he joined the Royal Engineers on 26 April 1910, as No. 20083. On 24 February 1911, he set sail for Gibraltar on the southern tip of Spain. McCudden spent eighteen months in Gibraltar before returning to England in September 1912. While in Gibraltar he read Flight manual magazine habitually, which explained the theory of flight, aircraft construction and aero engines. He excelled in his service and by 26 April 1913 he had become a qualified Sapper. He also held the grade Air Mechanic 2nd Class, No. 892, which was awarded to him on 28 April 1913. Soon afterwards he became a member of the Royal Flying Corps (RFC). On 9 May he was posted to Farnborough depot as a mechanic.

McCudden's tenure at the aerodrome began ominously. The same day he was granted a request to travel as an observer in a Royal Aircraft Factory B.E.2, disaster struck which could conceivably have ended his career. Instructed to familiarise himself with the aircraft around the airfield he examined a Caudron Type A, and proceeded to turn over the engine. The aircraft was listed as unserviceable and McCudden saw no danger in leaving the throttle fully open. Suddenly the engine started and it accelerated out of the hangar and into a Farman MF.11. McCudden watched as the propeller chewed the wing to pieces and damaged his commanding officer's car which had been parked nearby. He was able to reach the cockpit and switch off the ignition but not before extensive damage had been done. For this misdemeanor he was brought before Colonel Frederick Sykes, commanding the RFC Military Wing. Sykes was pleased with his overall progress, which likely saved him, but sentenced McCudden to seven days detention and a forfeiture of 14 days pay for the incident. Five years later Sykes again met McCudden—then at the height of his fame—and chaffed him on the episode, even jokingly threatening to send him a bill for the car.

On 15 June 1913 he was posted to No. 3 Squadron RFC. He managed a flight in a Blériot aircraft while there and gradually won a reputation as a first-rate mechanic. By Christmas his frequent requests for trips in the aircraft had met with so much success that McCudden had logged nearly 30 hours, mostly in the Blériot monoplanes. On 1 April 1914 he was promoted to Air Mechanic First Class.

== War service ==
=== An observer airman ===
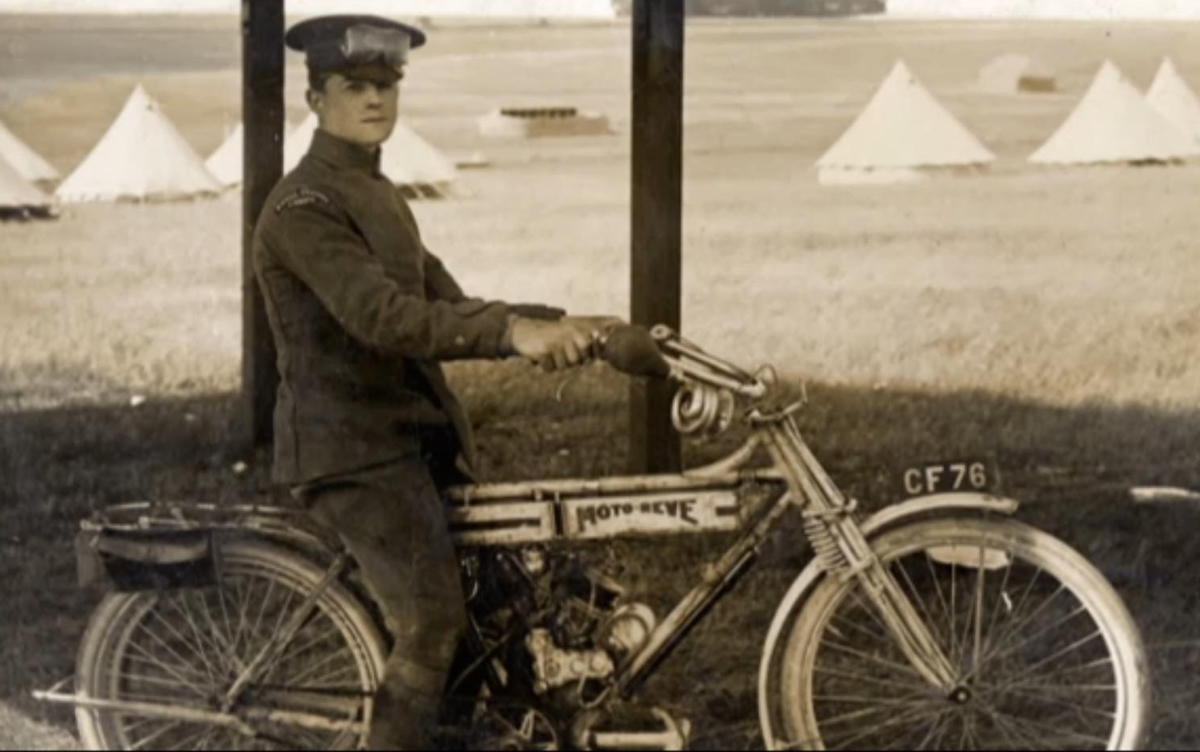
McCudden indulging in his other engineering interest: motorcycles. Pictured here on a Moto Reve model, 1913 at the RFC manoeuvres.

In August 1914 he travelled to France as a mechanic with 3 Squadron after war was declared, which followed the German invasion of Belgium. It operated as a reconnaissance unit and McCudden began to fly as an observer. After stopping at Amiens for several days, the unit began reconnoitering enemy positions. 3 Squadron offered support to the British Army at the Battle of Mons in Belgium. That month McCudden saw his first German aircraft on 22 August. On 25 August the British began their retreat, south-west, toward Paris. 3 Squadron moved to no fewer than nine different landing grounds, often delaying departure until the enemy was only a mile or two behind. Eventually they settled at Melun, south of Paris. In the autumn, McCudden participated in locating German artillery positions as the Allied armies drove back the enemy at the First Battle of the Marne and First Battle of the Aisne. McCudden flew these missions with a rifle since aircraft lacked any fixed armament.

McCudden performed well and took on more administrative responsibilities once he was promoted to Corporal on 20 November 1914. During this period, the First Battle of Ypres was being fought and the Squadron re-equipped with the higher performing Morane-Saulnier L aircraft. Several months later, on 1 April 1915, he was promoted to sergeant and made NCO in charge of all engines in his flight. McCudden's delight at gaining a promotion was cut short by news that his brother William had been killed in an air crash while flying an elderly Blériot. Just a week later, his eldest sister Mary lost her husband in an explosion which destroyed the minelayer HMS Princess Irene on 27 May 1915.

Undeterred, McCudden made a formal application to become a pilot and fly on operations but it was rejected on the grounds he was too valuable to risk losing. His reputation as a mechanic had spread since his supervision in the unit had led to a record-low number of engine failures. He continued to fly as an observer despite the recommendation of his rejection letter.

On 8 June he made his first official observer qualifying sortie which he passed. At this time the German Luftstreitkräfte (Air Service) introduced the Fokker Eindecker fighter equipped with Synchronization gear. Firing through the propeller, the Germans had a machine that soon became a serious threat to McCudden's unit. The enemy succeeded establishing a period of air superiority at this time. McCudden still flew regularly as an observer with the new commanding Officer, Edgar Ludlow-Hewitt, who had taken over command on 20 November 1915. He recorded a flight of 2 hours 40 minutes on 27 November which included an abortive chase after an Albatros C.I reconnaissance aircraft. On 16 December 1915 he acted as aerial gunner, when he drove off an attack on his flight by the German ace Max Immelmann. While firing at the Fokker, McCudden saw a piece of paper or fabric fall off the German machine. Although the ground was diligently searched, no trace of it was found. On 19 January 1916, McCudden exchanged fire with another German observer without result.

During this time, McCudden's Squadron was also experimenting with Wireless technology. Captain D.S Lewis, who commanded the headquarters flight, fitted his B.E.2a with a wireless set to help direct artillery fire. In April 1915 he commanded 3 Squadron and became McCudden's commanding officer. He was killed a year later when he was shot down by ground-fire. It is unknown whether McCudden participated in these pioneering ventures.

On 21 January 1916 McCudden was awarded the Croix de guerre for gallantry. He travelled to Lillers to receive his award from General Joseph Joffre, Commander-in-Chief of the French Army. On 23 January he was promoted to flight sergeant and 24 hours later he was ordered home to England to begin pilot training.

=== Pilot training ===
McCudden was based at Farnborough and began his training on 22 February 1916. He started with a 20-minute flight in a Henry Farman pusher. McCudden had already flown 100 hours as a passenger with 25 different pilots including 46 hours as a regular observer since November 1915 and had much experience with his surroundings. His instructor was impressed with his grasp of the mechanics and theory. He practiced six landings and progressed to the more powerful Avro 504 as the last Farman had been written off by another student.

On 9 April he was sent to Gosport, assigned to No. 41 Squadron RFC, and made his first solo flight on 16 April in a Farman MF.7. Later that day he was awarded his Royal Aero Club certificate after completing four figure-of-eight turns, a glide from 1,200 feet and a landing within forty yards of a selected mark. He completed 22 flights at Gosport, the longest a 50-minute flight to 7,000 feet. On 29 April he was posted to the Central Flying School (CFS) at Upavon, near Salisbury Plain, for advanced training, arriving on 1 May.

On 7 May he became the 107th non-commissioned officer to receive his CFS certificate, passing as Second Class Flier. He was good enough to be selected as an instructor and took his first pupil after having flown only nine hours of solo flight himself. Two of his pupils included the future ace and 56 Squadron colleague Geoffrey Hilton Bowman and Mick Mannock. Soon afterwards, while teaching a student in an Airco DH.1, the aircraft entered a dangerous spin. McCudden narrowly avoided a crash, pulling up feet above the ground. An impact would certainly have killed them both.

On 30 May he was graded First Class Flier. The grade was based upon his achievements; he had achieved a dead-stick landing within a fifty-yard marker, a 15-minute flight at 6,000 feet, a 60-mile cross-country flight and 15 hours solo flying. On 24 May he passed his final test with a two-hour flight from Salisbury, to Southampton and on to Basingstoke. His 74 hours flying experience was well above the minimum. By the time he left for France in June he had accumulated 121 flying hours, given 177 lessons as instructor, and had personally tutored 40 student pilots.

=== Back at the front line ===
McCudden joined No. 20 Squadron on 8 July 1916. The unit was equipped with Royal Aircraft Factory F.E.2 and flew from Clairmarais aerodrome, near Saint-Omer. He flew his first operational sortie two days later and continued as the Battle of the Somme raged. The Squadron was ordered to intercept and shoot down German reconnaissance aircraft. He patrolled the Ypres and Roeselare (Roulers) region. He did not spot any enemy reconnaissance machines but did come into contact with a single Fokker near Lille. Flying in formation, the British were well placed to deal with lone German fighters since they could use their gunners to form a formidable defence screen. This particular German used a tactic of climbing above the British, making a diving attack at the rear-most aircraft and diving away if he did not score a decisive hit. Two days later McCudden ran out of fuel in the Lille district. Disorientated because of heavy mist, he force-landed in Allied territory, crashing and coming to halt in the garden of a French farmhouse. Little damage was done to the machine. On 2 August he took part in an operation to bomb the Zeppelin sheds at Brussels. The flight was unmolested, though the familiar lone Fokker made an appearance and then withdrew without attacking.

That same evening McCudden was told to pack his belongings since he was to be reassigned to 29 Squadron RFC flying Airco DH.2 scouts. McCudden was pleased to be flying scouts, finding it "light after flying the F.E." McCudden soon found from pilots that the machine was not popular and had to be handled with care. Nevertheless, while on patrol between Armentières and Ypres on 6 September 1916 he scored his first victory. He engaged an all-white Albatros B.II, and shot it down. He then chased another but it escaped through superior speed. Confirmation of his victory was given three days later by a I ANZAC Corps unit. It had crashed on the Gheluve-Mennin road at the time and place of his claim. McCudden nearly added to this score the following day. He engaged a Fokker monoplane but his gun jammed. Switching off his engine, he rectified the damage but the Fokker pilot took the opportunity to pursue him. Restarting his engine as the German closed, McCudden outmanoeuvred him and was presented with a close-astern shot, but once again his gun jammed and the battle ended inconclusively when the faster Fokker dived away.

McCudden did not score again during the year but had a remarkable escape on 27 December 1916. Flying from Arras to Monchy on patrol, his flight of six DH.2s engaged an enemy formation of Albatros D.IIs. McCudden rushed to the aid of Alexander James, a member of his flight, who had been attacked by a German fighter. He attacked the Albatros head-on but his gun jammed after 20 shots. As he fought to clear the jam he found himself surrounded by German fighters.

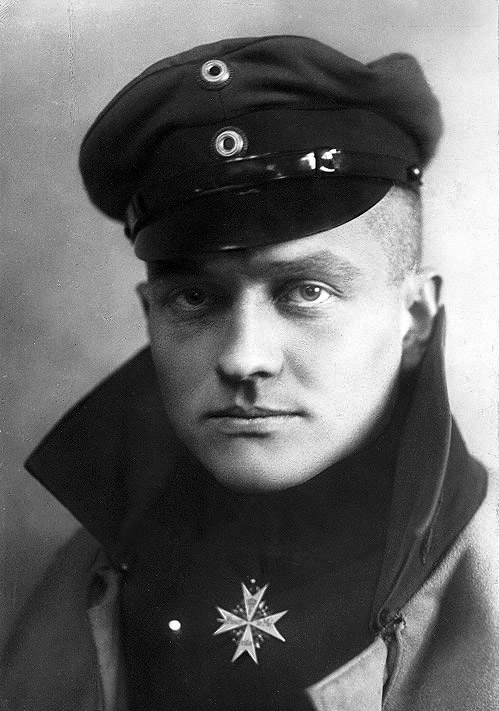
Manfred von Richthofen. Possibly McCudden's opponent on 27 December 1916.

One soon latched onto him and began firing. McCudden dived steeply but the enemy pilot remained behind him. At 800 feet McCudden began a spinning dive until the German, now some distance behind, abruptly turned away. The enemy aircraft was fired at by British ground forces and McCudden, who by now had unjammed his Lewis machine gun, turned to give pursuit. The enemy pilot, apparently unaware of this, was already too high and McCudden watched as he re-joined his flight and departed the area.

McCudden returned to base; in spite of his narrow escape his machine had not been hit. His squadron mates were surprised to see him; they had witnessed his dive, assumed the spin to be terminal, and were in the process of posting him missing in action. It has been suggested that the enemy pilot was none other than Manfred von Richthofen, "The Red Baron", in which case McCudden had narrowly avoided becoming the rising star's 15th victim. Richthofen was credited with a "two seat Vickers biplane" that afternoon, which has usually been listed as the F.E.2b of Captain Quested and Lieutenant Dicksee, but recent research indicates that the action with McCudden may fit the time frame.

1916 ended on a personal high for McCudden. He received his commission on 28 December which came into effect on 1 January 1917. He was granted two weeks leave and returned to England. As a second lieutenant, McCudden returned to France on 21 January. He was determined to build up his personal tally despite the limitations of his DH.2. The very same day he was forced down for the first and only time. He attacked an Albatros D.III and damaged its engine which stopped. Unfortunately another attacked and he was forced to break off a certain kill when one of his propeller blades was partly shot off. Another DH.2 intervened and McCudden landed near Arras, ordered a new propeller, and flew back to base. Since no member witnessed the fate of the Albatros no claim was made.

McCudden's fortunes changed in the new year. He dispatched a two-seater on 26 January and another on 2 February 1917. On 5 February he attacked an Albatros C.III returning from a photo-reconnaissance mission. Diving out of the sun to blind the gunner, he shot it down over the front line, where it was shelled by British artillery. Ten days later he engaged an Albatros escorted by a LFG Roland C.II. After a brief dogfight and pursuit, the Albatros escaped but he destroyed the Roland which crashed near Monchy. The next day McCudden was awarded the Military Cross for his fifth victory. His award was gazetted on 12 March.

=== Return to England ===
He returned to England on 23 February and was appointed an instructor once more. He was slightly aggrieved as he felt he was now getting into his stride as a fighter pilot. He had also hoped that his squadron was about to receive the French-designed Nieuports, which were a better match for the Albatros and Halberstadt "D" class fighters than the obsolescent DH.2. His posting was not surprising to him. The beginning of 1917 witnessed an enormous expansion of the RFC and experienced tutors were required to train the mass of new students.

McCudden was posted to the 6th Training Wing at Maidstone until transferred to Dover on 15 April where he learned to fly the Bristol Scout. One of his aircraft was adorned with the name "Teddie", which his fellow officers suspected was the name of a girlfriend—a blonde dancer, Ms Teddie O'Neil. McCudden was notoriously private about this aspect of his life but it was suspected that he took her on unauthorised flights in the Scout since his log book recorded such escapades in April. He praised the qualities of his Scout even though he managed to survive two accidents in this aircraft on 29 April and 2 June. Concurrent with his tenure at Dover, his brother John also enrolled as a pilot pupil there. To avoid accusations of favouritism, he remained aloof from his brother which amused his senior officers who had guessed his intentions.

In late May and June he collected and experimented on the new Sopwith Pups which began to reach British units in January. He was impressed with the aircraft's agility and flew it often. During this period he met the now famous ace Albert Ball who advised him attack tactics against reconnaissance and bomber aircraft. Ball advised McCudden to fly underneath his target, in the blind spot of the observer, and angle his guns directly above then fire. McCudden was intrigued at the prospect and believed this offered a much better chance of shooting down an enemy aircraft. It is not clear if, or how often, McCudden implemented Ball's advice in battle and how many of his victories were claimed that way. McCudden's principal tactics did stress surprise and minimal risk.

It is known McCudden proved remarkably good at stalking tactics, which enabled him to get up underneath an opponent, pull down the wing gun and fire up into the German machine. The first the recipients would know of the attack was bullets coming up through the bottom of the fuselage of the aircraft, often causing death or injury, holing petrol tanks and crippling engines. The gun, being fed by a drum of ammunition, could also be reloaded in its pulled-down position, the pilot having two or more spare drums located in his cockpit.

This conversation coincided with the Gotha Raids in which German heavy bombers attacked London. He attempted interceptions against the high-flying machines and on 13 June finally got to within range of one. He fired but it swerved and resumed course. He chased the formation 21 miles (34 km) out to sea but could not get closer than 500 feet (160m). On 7 July he shot down the Gotha crewed by Leutnant Erwin Kollberg and Walter Aschoff (of bomber unit Bogohl 3). He damaged a second and narrowly avoided a collision with the machine as he flew by. On one raid a Gotha gunner's bullet struck his windshield. The raids continued and British aerial defences gained only a handful of successes against the Gothas.

Before returning to France, McCudden met with Frank Barnwell and Harold Barnwell, the sibling chief engineers at Vickers Limited, with whom he exchanged information on aircraft design and operations. The brothers gained a greater appreciation of the pilot's perspective. After watching him fly the F.B.9, the brothers were convinced of his skill and consequently McCudden was invited to fly several of their products. Among these machines was the Vickers F.B.16. McCudden claimed to have reached 136 mph (219 km/h) in the aircraft, describing it as a "nice bus". Other pilots noted it was faster than the French SPAD and the S.E.5. On the strength of this evaluation Vickers approached the War Office for front line use. It was not selected for production. McCudden believed the unavailability of the engine was a main factor in its rejection.

=== With 56 Squadron ===
In June he joined No. 66 Squadron RFC at Aire, equipped with the Sopwith Pup. He undertook a refresher course but his tenure there was unremarkable. He was ordered to fly with the group rather than fly solo patrols. He flew 47 hours in 66 Squadron and 21 patrols. He encountered the enemy six times but could not score. Finally on 21 and 26 July he shot down one Albatros D.V fighter for his 6–7th aerial victories.

He flew 13 different Pups while with the unit which meant he returned across the English Channel to collect new aircraft frequently. While collecting one from Rochester, England on 12 August 1917 a Gotha raid occurred and within 30 minutes he was flying at 17,000 feet over Herne Bay in an attempt to intercept them. Once more, he returned without success against the high-flying Gothas. After landing from the sortie he was informed he was to be transferred to the recently formed No. 56 Squadron which was winning a reputation as a very successful unit over the Western Front. The unit was equipped with the Royal Aircraft Factory S.E.5 (S.E.5a) fighters which were among the most effective combat aircraft of the war and arguably the best designed British fighter of the conflict. It was heavily armed and very fast for its time.

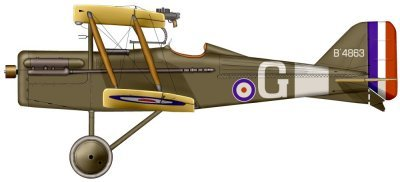
52 of McCudden's 57 victims fell while he was flying the S.E.5.

Along with the new fighter McCudden was eager to fly was the company he would be flying with. Albert Ball (44 victories), rising star Arthur Rhys-Davids (27) and McCudden's former pupil Geoffrey Hilton Bowman (32) were just some of the fighter aces who flew with the unit. Though Ball was killed in May 1917, he would fly and fight alongside Rhys-Davids, Bowman, Richard Maybery, Reginald Hoidge and Keith Muspratt.

This competitive group would spur McCudden to increase his score. 56's commanding officer, Major Richard Bloomfield noticed McCudden's leadership qualities and had hoped he could help turn the unit into an effective fighting team. At present the pilots, though talented, performed more as individuals. After flying for the first time with them Bloomfield promised to have him allocated to a position of Flight Commander. He formally took command of B flight on 14 August.

McCudden brought his substantial technical knowledge to 56 Squadron. He frequently inspected his flight's aircraft, expecting a high standard of mechanical refinement. He believed the finer the aircraft could be tuned the less likelihood there would be of losing pilots to structural or mechanical failures, which at that time were the cause of many fatalities among aircrew. Force-landings were rarely fatal owing to the low-landing speeds but the prospect of coming down behind enemy lines—especially since the RFC was adopting an offensive stance—was an undesirable prospect. Alex J. Gray, Air Mechanic First Class, 56 Squadron:

When McCudden came to No. 56 he certainly kept us on our toes to begin with. In the first few weeks he tried out just about every fitter in the flight, and none of them seemed to please him. Finally Corporal Tom Rogers and myself were detailed as his fitters and Corporal Bert Card as the rigger, and from that day on we formed a great friendship with him.

=== Victories 8–57 ===
On 31 July the Third Battle of Ypres began and the unit was heavily involved. 56 was tasked with air superiority operations to allow RFC bomber and reconnaissance units to operate with relative freedom. The Germans had adopted a defensive stratagem of massing their aircraft, now increasingly outnumbered, at critical points of the front. Their units were also a collection of highly successful aces. The S.E.5s engaged in battle with the German fighters throughout the summer. (Note: For information concerning the development of aerial tactics and counter-tactics at this time see work by James Corum.)

On 18 August 1917 McCudden scored his first victory as an official member of 56 Squadron over an Albatros D.V. Another the following day and two on 20 August raised his tally from 7 to 11 victories. He was pleased with his success but berated the armourers for the frequent gun-stoppages. Over the next four weeks his machine suffered engine difficulties and gun-jams. He could only claim damaged enemy aircraft and once suffered a galling experience when the DFW C.V reconnaissance he was attacking holed his engine while his guns jammed. It had to be sent for major repairs. He received a new fighter, B4863, which then became his regular mount.

McCudden was determined his machine would remain in first-class fighting order. He spent three days working with his fitters and armourers, stripping down the Vickers gun's synchronising gear, firing at the butts and making eight test flights shooting at ground targets. His armourers joked that his guns would never work in the air if he wore them out on the ground. He continued to experience jams and his unclaimed victim of 14 September 1917—Ernst Wiegand—was able to escape and crash-land wounded in German territory thanks to another stoppage. Since his crash was not witnessed his claim went uncredited.

On 19 September he attacked a Rumpler C.IV which he drove down to 1,000 feet and saw camera and photographic plates fall from the machine as it took violent evasive action. He abandoned the chase and spotted another. This time he attacked from the sun and from behind and below. His Lewis gun stopped after one round but his Vickers fired 60 rounds and the Rumpler crashed behind enemy lines. Other pilots and gunners on the line confirmed the kill. A DFW C.V followed on 23 September—his 13th victory.

After this victory his flight engaged a Fokker Dr.I flown by the 48-victory ace Werner Voss and an Albatros piloted by Carl Menckhoff. Voss, aided by the frequent jams of his opponents' guns, avoided being hit and drove two S.E.5's out of the fight before being fatally hit by Rhys-Davids. McCudden's account of this fight has become famous:

He was very low ... still being engaged by an SE ... the pilot being Rhys-Davids. I noticed the triplane's movements were very erratic ... I saw him go into a steep dive ... and then saw the triplane hit the ground and disappear into a thousand fragments. As long as I live I shall never forget my admiration for that German pilot, who single-handed fought seven of us for ten minutes and also put some bullets through all our machines. His flying was wonderful, his courage magnificent, and in my opinion he was the bravest German airman whom it has been my privilege to see fight.

Over the course of September and October McCudden added five victories including a LVG C.V on 26 September, raising his tally from 13 to 18. On 6 October he was awarded the Bar to his Military Cross. Another five in November brought his tally to 23. His method of diving behind and under the enemy machines before firing was working particularly well.

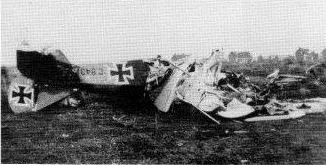
McCudden's 18th victory, 21 October 1917: Unteroffizier Richard Hiltweis and Leutnant Hans Laitko did not survive.

In December he downed another 14 enemies for victory numbers 24–37 including several during the Battle of Cambrai. His successes included four on 23 December, three on 28th and two on the 29th. In December 1917 he received the Distinguished Service Order and a Bar He received two congratulatory messages from AOC RFC Hugh Trenchard on 6 and 12 December:

Well done. You are splendid. Your work lately has been of the finest.

McCudden had hardened to the realities of aerial combat by this time and revelled in his own success. He appeared to have limited empathy for his opponents, most of whom did not survive his attacks. On 24 January, after claiming his 43rd air victory, he remarked:

This D.F.W crew deserved to die, because they had no notion whatever of how to defend themselves, which showed that during their training they must have been slack, and lazy, and probably liked going to Berlin too often instead of sticking to their training and learning as much as they could while they had the opportunity. I had no sympathy for those fellows, and that is the mental estimate which I formed of them while flying back to my aerodrome to report the destruction of my 43rd aerial victory.

McCudden was now closing in on the tally of Albert Ball who was credited with 44 enemy aircraft. A further nine in January 1918 elevated his tally from 37 to 46. In February, 11 aircraft brought his tally to 57—four fell on the 16th. After achieving his 57th he probably downed a 58th—a Hannover CL.III—but it went down over enemy lines under control as McCudden's guns seized having already fired 300 rounds at his first victim.

By this stage McCudden was suffering from combat fatigue. It manifested itself in his decisions, of late, to seek a victory at any price, which was alien to his normal, calculated approach to combat. Knowing he was to soon be sent home, he was obsessed with catching up to von Richthofen's score. His contribution to 56 Squadron at this time was impressive; the unit had claimed 175 enemy aircraft while reporting 14 pilots killed and missing and seven captured. As Flight Commander, B Flight, McCudden's pilots had shot down 77–52 of which were his—while losing four pilots. To celebrate his success he dined with Brigadier General John Higgins and the following evening was invited to the headquarters of General Julian Byng, General Officer Commanding the British Third Army, to be personally congratulated.

McCudden was soon rotated home on 5 March. More than 50 officers gathered for a formal farewell dinner and they presented him with a silver model of his S.E.5A on 4 March. McCudden would not see action again. In the remaining eight months of the war, only British pilots Billy Bishop (72) and Mick Mannock (61) and Raymond Collishaw (60) would surpass his total while serving with the RFC (and later the Royal Air Force—RAF). Ernst Udet (62) René Fonck (75) and Manfred von Richthofen (80) were the only foreign pilots to beat McCudden's total. (Note: See List of World War I aces credited with 20 or more victories)

=== Modified S.E.5a ===
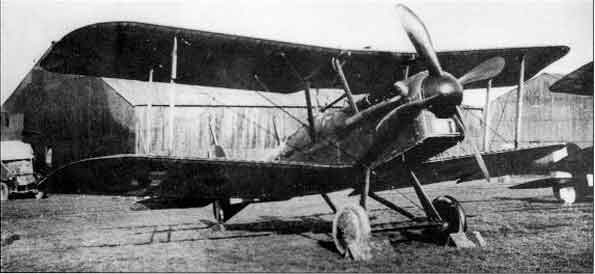
McCudden's personal S.E.5 (8491 G), 1918. The four blades had a spinner added from a German aircraft he shot down on 30 November 1917.

McCudden's long-term interest in mechanics prompted him to modify his own aircraft to increase combat performance. He made a series of modifications to his aircraft which caused them to excel in performance in comparison to any other S.E.5 at the front and perhaps any other German fighter available at the time. Performance, a generic term, required improvements in all-round capability. McCudden's changes were made with one main objective in mind: high-altitude performance. He had achieved some success without these personal experiments. On 23 December 1917, for example, he intercepted an enemy aircraft at 18,000 feet and drove it down to 8,000 feet before shooting it down for his 30th victory. Incidentally, he was nearly killed in action when one of the wings broke away from his victim and nearly struck his own aircraft.

McCudden had always found it difficult to intercept high-flying German reconnaissance aircraft. The latest Rumpler C.VII which had entered service proved particularly elusive. With a 240 horse power engine, it could reach 24,000 feet and was thus beyond the reach of any prospective adversary. The average S.E.5, at that point, could reach only 17,000 feet. While most pilots were prepared to accept this tactical-technological situation, McCudden was not.

Through an as yet unspecified channel, he obtained high compression pistons used in the latest Hispano-Suiza 8 or V8 engine and fitted them to his power plant. It delivered revolutions at a much faster rate on the test bench. He removed any excess weight by shortening the exhaust pipes by several feet. He also added a spinner from a captured enemy aircraft which he believed added an extra 3 mph to his speed while also reducing the wing dihedral to increase agility.

A final alteration was to fit a simpler shutter (radiator vent) which had the object of warming the cockpit by directing heat from the engine. For McCudden this aspect was very important. At high altitude McCudden was to spend long periods of time in an extremely chilly environment. Operating the D.H.2 in 1916, he suffered terrible agonies as adequate blood circulation returned to his muscles once he reached terra firma. McCudden reported few general side-effects from high flight. Dizziness was a feature but he put this down to the cold rather than any form of anoxia. High altitude oxygen was too thin for humans which induced breathlessness. Aviation medicine was still in its infancy meaning pilots were left to solve operational problems themselves. Only the high-altitude bombers were equipped with oxygen equipment to assist with breathing. Despite his circulation difficulties, McCudden proved remarkably resistant to the effects of high altitude flying without oxygen.

The results of these personal modifications mostly went unrecorded. It is believed he achieved a height of 10,000 feet in nine minutes, curtailing the standard time by some five minutes. It was perhaps on exaggeration but no record remains to certify what McCudden did. He did note the maximum ground-level speed as 135 mph in his log book. He achieved these feats with the limited resources of a front-line squadron and without any official assistance.

Eager to test the modifications, he began operations on 28 January 1918. Until 16 February when 8491 was submitted for repair, he claimed his 45–50th aerial victories, the last at 11:30 on that date. His last victory that day was scored in another machine.

=== War hero ===
Unlike the German and French governments, the War Office had been reluctant to identify individual soldiers and aces for propaganda and public consumption, the most notable exception being Albert Ball. However, from December 1917 Viscount Northcliffe, the proprietor of the Daily Mail newspaper was appointed to the Ministry of Information. Northcliffe was an enthusiast for aviation. He campaigned for "air mindedness", when aircraft began to make technological headway and the nation, now facing the existence and efficiency of airships which could circumvent the North Sea and English Channel, was now increasingly concerned about aerial bombardment. Northcliffe supported the creation of the Air League and the Aerial League of the British Empire, a pressure group designed to impress upon a lethargic government the promising and threatening nature of aerial vehicles.

As head of the Ministry and Daily Mail, he felt an opportunity was being missed, and so ran a campaign in his publications to name outstanding individual combatants. On 3 January 1918 he ran a story in the Daily Mail under the headline "Our Unknown Air Heroes", which focused primarily on McCudden. In the front page segment it read:

What I want to know is why an Englishman whose hobby is bringing down sky Huns in braces and trios between luncheon and tea, who can already claim a bag of 30 enemy aircraft, should have to wait and be killed before a grateful nation waiting to acclaim him could even learn his name?
I wonder if people in England realize that the German Air Service is the most popular and feted branch of the Kaiser's war machine because German authorities have imagination enough to exploit its personal side? How many people in these islands can name as many British airmen there are fingers on one hand?

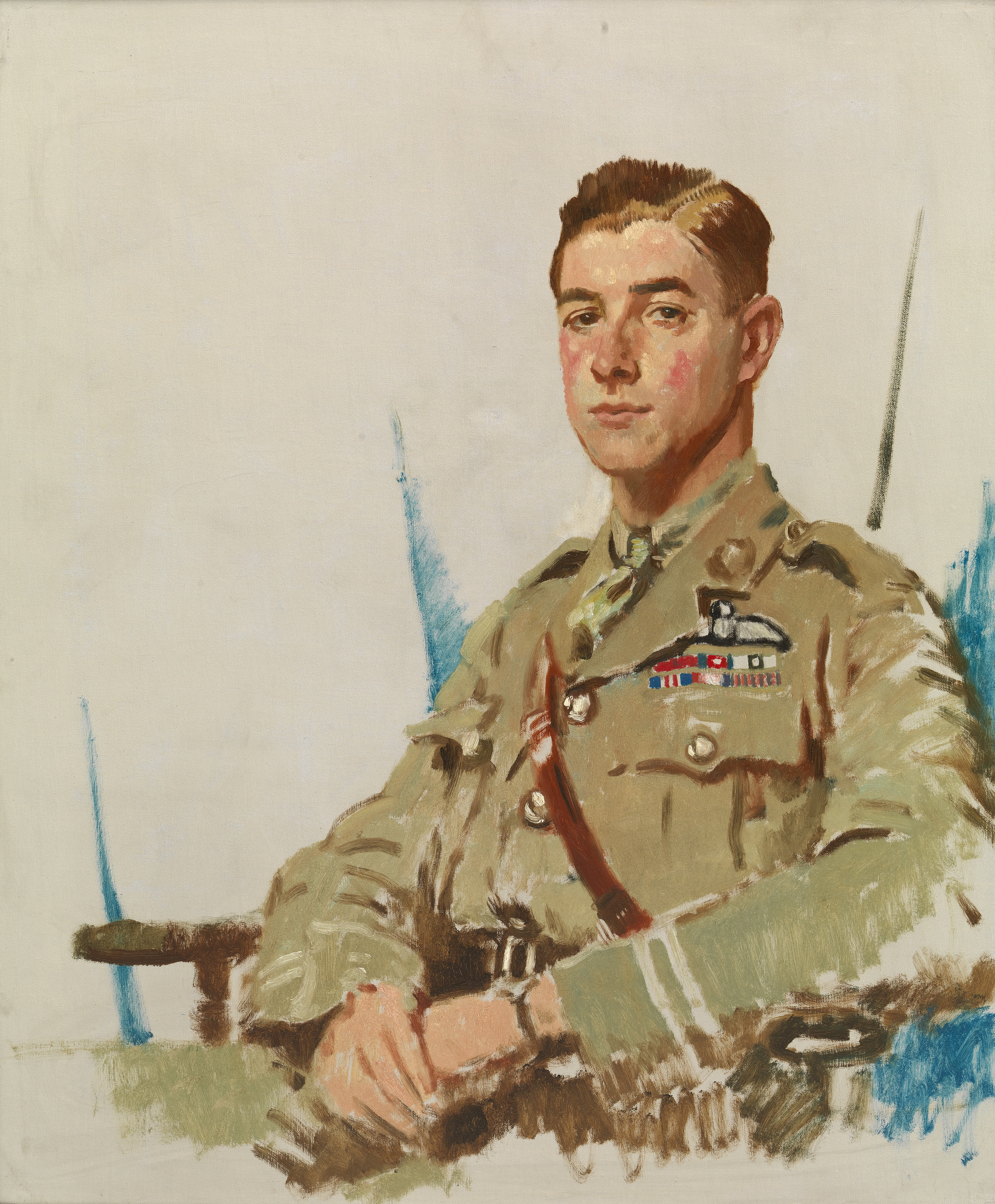
Portrait by William Orpen (1918)

The campaign was an instant success. The Daily Chronicle echoed these sentiments with "Young Lionheart of the Air". On 7 January the Daily Mail ran the story "Our Wonderful Airmen—Their names at Last." The article was accompanied by a large photograph of McCudden and other pilots. Thereafter exploits of British airmen were routinely published. McCudden loathed the attention. In a letter to his father the following day he believed such "bosh" and hero worship would make him an unpopular figure in the RFC and with his comrades.

He was thankful to be posted to the No. 1 School of Aerial Fighting at Ayr in Scotland, where he flew the excellent performing Sopwith Snipe. It was in Scotland that he learned of the death of his brother, apparently shot down by the German ace Hans Wolff on 19 March. He wrote to his brother's commanding officer, Sholto Douglas asking for any news but understanding the Major's attention was now fixed on the German spring offensive. His death depressed McCudden greatly.

The same month he returned home, he was awarded the Victoria Cross, the highest award for gallantry. The letter from Trenchard confirming the King had bestowed this honour upon him was dated 30 March 1918. The award was gazetted on 29 March and the details were published on 2 April 1918. Shying away from this publicity, McCudden did not even tell his family of his attendance at Buckingham Palace on 6 April to receive his Victoria Cross from King George V and promotion to major. While on leave in London, he socialised a great deal with his friend Mick Mannock. He met C. G. Grey owner of The Aeroplane weeks later who offered to help McCudden finish his manuscript for his biography, Flying Fury, due for publication that year. McCudden accepted. Now famous, he also had his portrait painted by the known artist William Orpen.

== Death ==
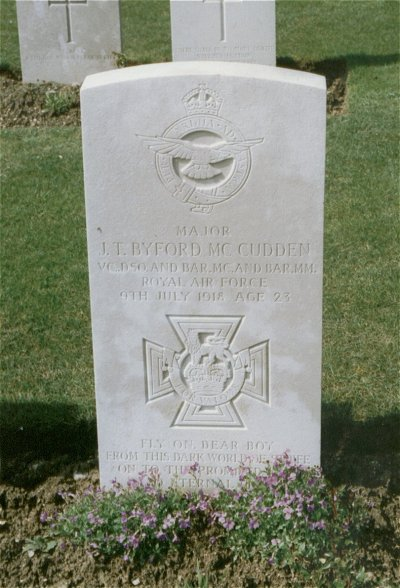
McCudden's grave

McCudden remained in England until July 1918 when he was given command of No. 60 Squadron RAF. He flew to Farnborough in a Vickers F.B.16 to collect his new Royal Aircraft Factory S.E.5a before returning to France to lead his new Squadron. On 3 July he flew back in this fighter and over his home in Kingston upon Thames, taking the aircraft to 17,000 feet and circling London for an hour. When he landed, he made his last entry into his log book. His total flying time had reached 872 hours and 40 minutes.

On the morning of 9 July 1918 he travelled to the home of his fiancée, Miss Alex-Tweedie in Whitehall Court. Tweedie recalled their conversation revolved around his new posting and his book. He had delivered the manuscript to Grey two days earlier, and was expecting its publication. While there, McCudden promised to surpass von Richthofen, who had been killed in action on 21 April 1918. In view of what happened to von Richthofen and John McCudden, he promised that "I won't bustle, or do anything foolish like my brother". He then went next door, and had breakfast with his sister Mary. Upon leaving, he fumbled around in his pocket and handed her a bulky envelope containing his Victoria Cross and other decorations. He took his leave of her and drove to Hounslow, where he climbed into his S.E.5a (C1126). He took off shortly after 13:00. McCudden certainly stopped en route, since about six o'clock that afternoon he called the AOC No. 13 Wing, Patrick Playfair, to announce his imminent arrival at Boffles, where No. 60 Squadron was stationed.

McCudden set out across the English Channel. Unsure of the dispositions on the ground after the German advance, he checked the airfield he suspected to be Boffles but found it empty. Flying in heavy mist he decided to head to Auxi-le-Château, France, to get directions from the RAF personnel stationed there. He approached Corporal W .H. Burdett and L. E. Vallins of 52 Squadron. Burdett had served with McCudden in 3 Squadron back in 1915. Burdett did not recognise him in his flying gear. They marked his map, and McCudden returned to his machine. Around 90 seconds after takeoff from Auxi-le-Château, the S.E.5a plunged into the ground. 8 Squadron's Corporal W. H. Howard was on the scene within minutes and fought through the fire to free McCudden who was lying next to one of the wings—he had not worn his safety belt. Burdett followed and recognised the pilot as soon as his headgear had been removed. He was taken to No. 21 Casualty clearing station and diagnosed with a fractured skull. He did not regain consciousness, and died at 20:00.

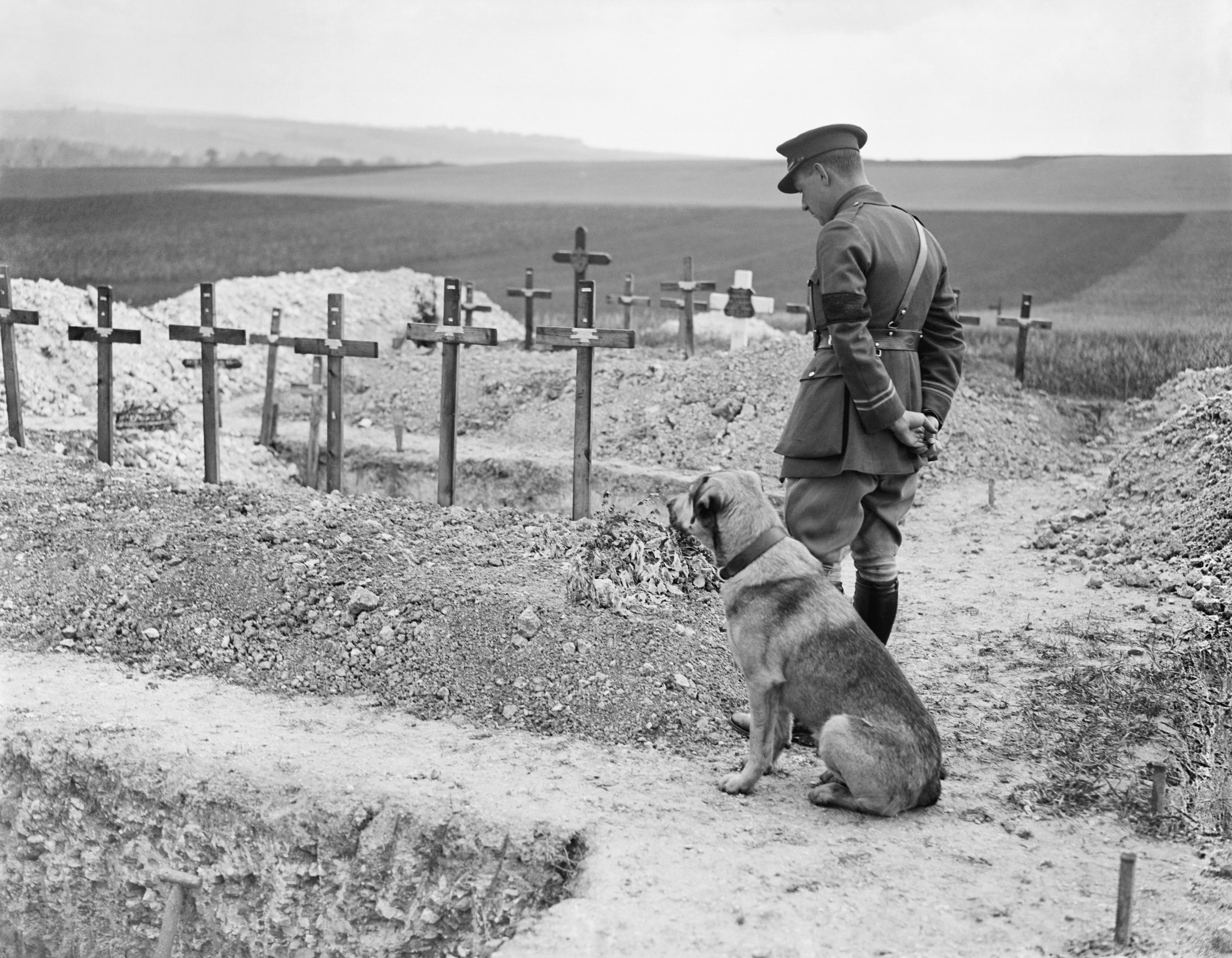
British officer and his dog at the Wavans War Cemetery where McCudden is buried, July 1918

Corporal Burdett later stated, "When McCudden took off he put the machine into a nearly vertical climb, seemed to do a half-roll and then nosed dived into a wood... it was usual for scout pilots to perform some little stunt... I think that is what he was doing." Witness Lieutenant L. M. Fenton had a different view, "the aircraft took off into wind and at about 100 feet did a vertical turn and flew back across the aerodrome by the side of the wood. The engine appeared to be running badly. The pilot rolled the machine, which failed to straighten out, at approximately 200 feet. It crashed nose down into the wood." Lieutenant E.M Greenwood stated he thought the crash was the result of a failed aerobatic manoeuvre: "I was watching an S.E.5 flying over the aerodrome at about 200 feet, when it did one complete roll to the right, then dived steeply to the ground behind the trees." Lieutenant K. V. King believed a similar thing: "[It flew]... very low over the aerodrome, going east towards the wood on the south-east side of the aerodrome. He had apparently been rolling. I saw him nose down and engine off entering the trees and immediately afterwards heard a crash." Lieutenant T. H. Barry, though supports the notion that something was amiss with the engine: "I saw an S.E.5 flying from west to east across the aerodrome at 200–300 feet. The engine was firing irregularly. Just after crossing the end of the aerodrome the pilot did a sharp stalling turn. The nose dropped and it dived behind the trees. During this dive the noise of the engine ceased."

Usually reports were issued on any incident with every aircraft. On the date McCudden died, 29 such returns exist for S.E.5s but the report pertaining to his accident is not among them leaving the official cause of the crash unexplained. It is possible the engine failed due to a wrongly installed carburettor. However, there is some doubt as to whether a mechanical defect was the culprit. The witnesses reported the pilot was attempting low-level stunts, manifesting in several turns and rolls. Many years later other witnesses disputed the aircraft performed a roll, but all agreed the trouble began when the machine entered an attitude resembling a near-vertical turn.

McCudden's remains were subsequently buried at the nearby Wavans war cemetery in the Pas de Calais. McCudden's death occurred only two months after the death of German ace Manfred von Richthofen, whom some commented had been honoured with a longer and more elaborate funeral by the British. McCudden's wartime score was 57 victories included 19 captured, 27 and 1 shared destroyed, 8 and 2 shared "down out of control"—an official classification which still counted the claim as a victory.

== Relics and memorial ==
On the morning of 9 July, McCudden had handed his sister an envelope over breakfast, which was subsequently found to contain all of his medals. Today all of McCudden's medals including his Victoria Cross are displayed at the Royal Engineers Museum in Gillingham, Kent, alongside those of two of his brothers and his father. The original brass engraved grave plaque used, along with a wooden propeller, are also displayed. The shattered windscreen from McCudden's crashed S.E.5a is preserved in the collection of the Imperial War Museum. The museum's collections also include McCudden's uniform 'maternity jacket' and a half-length portrait of McCudden by William Orpen. In March 2009, McCudden and his contemporary Edward Mannock, were the subjects of the BBC Timewatch episode, WWI Aces Falling.

== List of victories ==
A complete list of the 58 claims by McCudden and the 57 credited to him.

Victory No.	Date	Time	Enemy Type	Location	Result	Notes
1	6 September 1916	13:15	Two-seater	Houthem-Gheluwe	Crashed	Unknown. But confirmed and witnessed by British ground forces.
2	26 January 1917	10:05	Two-seater	Ficheux	Crashed	
3	2 February 1917	14:50	Two-seater	Adinfer Wood	Crashed	Shared with Major A.W Gratten-Bellew.
4	6 February 1917	14:00	Albatros D.III	Adinfer Wood	Crashed	
5	15 February 1917	12:00	Roland C.II	Monchy	Crashed	
6	21 July 1917	20:00	Albatros D.V	Polygon Wood		
7	26 July 1917	20:15	Albatros D.V	Gheluwe		
8	18 August 1917	07:00	Albatros D.V	E Houthem		
9	19 August 1917	17:00	Albatros D.V	Gheluvelt		
10	20 August 1917	18:50	Albatros D.III	SE Polygon Wood	Flamed	Vizefeldwebel Karl-Josef Ohler (Jasta 24), in Albatros DIII No.756/17, killed.
11	20 August 1917	19:00	Albatros D.V	Polygon Wood		
u/c	14 September 1917	18:00	Albatros D.V	Roeselare		Believed to have been Oberleutnant Ernst Wiegand (3 victories), Jasta 10, wounded.
12	19 September 1917	12:15	Rumpler C.I	Radinghem	Crashed	
13	23 September 1917	13:00	DFW C.V	Gheluwe	Crashed	Unteroffizier Rudolf Francke and Leutnant Gustav Rudolph, (FA6), both killed.
14	26 September 1917	15:15	LVG C.V	SE Langemark (Langemarck)	Flames	Unteroffizier Hans Gossler and Bruno Wiedermann, Schutzstaffel 27. Both men killed. Wiedermann fell over German lines, the aircraft and Gossler over British lines.
15	28 September 1917	08:00	Albatros D.V	S Houthulst Forest	Crashed	Leutnant Gunther Pastor, Jasta 29, killed when he fell out at 9,000 feet.
16	1 October 1917	17:50	Albatros D.V	Westrozebeke		
17	17 October 1917	10:25	LVG C.V	S Vlammertinge		Flieger Heinrich Horstmann and Oberleutnant Ernst Hadrich, (FA8) in LVG No. 8431/16, both killed.
18	21 October 1917	13:00	Rumpler C.IV	Marzingarbe		Unteroffizier Richard Hiltweis and Leutnant Hans Laitko, FA5 (No. 8431/16), both killed.
19	18 November 1917	09:40	DFW C.V	Bellicourt		Possibly from FA210(A) or FA259(A)
20	23 November 1917	12:00	Albatros D.V	E Noyelles	Crashed	Possibly Vizefeldwebel Karl Bey, Jasta 5 killed. Bey had claimed one confirmed victory, one unconfirmed.
21	29 November 1917	07:30	DFW C.V	S Bellicourt	Crashed	Leutnant Kurt Dittrich and Leutnant Manfred Hoettger, FA202(A), both killed.
22	29 November 1917	13:15	DFW C.V	Rouvroy	Crashed	Leutnant Georg Dietrich and Leutnant Dietrich Schenk, FA268(A), both killed.
23	30 November 1917	11:15	LVG C.V	SE Havrincourt	Crashed	Vizefeldwebel Wilhelm Flohrig and Gefreiter Eckerle captured (FA19). Flohrig died of wounds 1 December.
24	5 December 1917	12:40	Rumpler C.VII	Hermies	Crashed	Leutnant Fritz Pauly and Leutnant Ernst Sauter, FA45b, both killed.
25	6 December 1917	10:25	Rumpler C.IV	NW Saint-Quentin	Crashed	Unteroffizier Karl Pohlisch and Leutnant Martin Becker, FA255(A), both killed.
26	6 December 1917	15:00	Albatros D.V	Fontaine	Crashed	
27	15 December 1917	11:05	Rumpler C.IV	E of Bois de Vaucelles	Crashed	
28	22 December 1917	12:05	DFW C.V	NW St Quentin		Unteroffizier Biesenbach and Unteroffizier Anton Bode, Schutzstaffel 5, both killed
29	23 December 1917	11:25	LVG C	Anguilcourt	Crashed	
30	23 December 1917	12:20	Rumpler C.VII	Gontescourt		Leutnant Otto Horing and Leutnant Emil Tibussek, FA 23 (s.no 3028/17), both killed
31	23 December 1917	14:40	Rumpler C	NW Gouzeaucourt		Crew from Bogohl 7, both captured.
32	23 December 1917	15:30	LVG C.V	Nr Metz-en-Couture		Vizefeldwebel Kurt Boje and Vizefeldwebel Friedrich Neimann, Schutzstaffel 12, both killed.
33	28 December 1917	12:15	Rumpler C	Velu Wood		Unteroffizier Munz and Lt. Ruecker, FA7, both captured.
34	28 December 1917	12:30	Rumpler C	Flers	Flames	Unteroffizier Oskar Guntert and Leutnant Hans Mittag, FA40(A), both killed.
35	28 December 1917	12:55	LVG C	Havrincourt Wood		Leutnant Albert Weinrich and Leutnant Walter Bergmann, FA210(A), both killed.
36	29 December 1917	08:55	LVG C	Havrincourt		Vizefeldwebel Kurt Gershal (died of wounds) and Unteroffizier Lehnert, captured, Schutzstaffel 10.
37	29 December 1917	14:00	LVG C	NE Epehy		Leutnant Walter Dern and Leutnant Georg Müller, FA33, both killed.
38	9 January 1918	11:30	LVG C	Graincourt	Crashed	
39	13 January 1918	09:40	LVG C	E Le Haucourt	Crashed	? Notler, killed and Leutnant Max Pappenheimer uninjured, FA2649(A).
40	13 January 1918	09:50	DFW C.V	N Vendhuile	Crashed	Vizefeldwebel Hans Rautenberg and Leutnant Gerhard Besser, Bogohl 7, both killed.
41	13 January 1918	10:05	LVG C	E Lempire	Flamed	Possibly one crew was Leutnant M. Rittermann (Bogohl 7) killed.
42	20 January 1918	10:30	LVG C	NW Cambrai	Crashed	Unteroffizier Gustav Mosch and Leutnant Friedrich Bracksiek, FA202(A), both killed.
43	24 January 1918	13:55	DFW C.V	Vitry		crew included Leutnant Georg Pallocks FA240, died of wounds.
44	25 January 1918	14:45	Rumpler C	Itancourt	Crashed	Leutnant Schramm, survived, Leutnant Hermann Bucher, died of wounds, FA225(A).
45	30 January 1918	11:15	Albatros	Anneux		Vizefeldwebel Adam Barth, Jasta 10, in Albatros DV 4565/17, killed.
46	30 January 1918	11:15	Pfalz D.III	Anneux		
47	2 February 1918	10:40	LVG C	E Vulu	Crashed	Vizefeldwebel Erich Szafranek and Leutnant Werner von Kuczkowski, Bogohl 7, both killed in LVG No. 9775/17.
48	16 February 1918	10:35	Rumpler C	SW Caudry	Crashed	Unteroffizier Max Hanicke and Leutnant Fritz Düsterdieck, FA269(A), both killed.
49	16 February 1918	10:45	DFW C	NE Le Catelet	Crashed	Unteroffizier Albert Fröhlich and Leutnant Ernst Karlowa, FA202(A), both killed.
50	16 February 1918	11:10	Rumpler C	Hargicourt	Crashed	
51	16 February 1918	12:30	Rumpler C.IV	Lagnicourt-Marcel		Gefreiter Heinrich Lechleiter and Lorenz Zeuch, Schutzstaffel 29b, both killed.
52	17 February 1918	10:25	Rumpler C.V	Guémappe		Possibly Leutnant Otto Jablonski and Joseph Klauke, FA 263(A), both killed.
53	18 February 1918	09:40	Albatros D.V	Vitry-en-Artois	Crashed	Unteroffizier Justus Kaiser, Jasta 35b in Albatros DV No. 4448/17, killed.
54	18 February 1918	09:45	Albatros D.V	Quiéry-la-Motte	Crashed	Unteroffizier Joachim von Stein zu Lausnitz, Jasta 35b, wounded in the left shoulder, neck and mouth: landed and hospitalised.
55	21 February 1918	13:47	DFW C.V	S Maricourt	Crashed	Vizefeldwebel Erich Klingenberg and Leutnant Karl Heger, FA235(A), both killed.
56	26 February 1918	11:20	Rumpler C	Oppy, Pas-de-Calais	Crashed	Vizefeldwebel Otto Kresse and Leutnant Rudolf Binting of FA7, both killed.
57	26 February 1918	11:30	Hannover CL	Chérisy	Crashed	Unteroffizier Max Schwaier and Leutnant Walter Jager, FA293(A), both killed.
