= Frederick Higginson =

Frederick William Higginson
- Born: 17 February 1913; Gorseinon, Wales
- Died: 12 February 2003 (aged 89); Carmarthenshire, Wales
- Military career
- Allegiance: United Kingdom
- Branch: Royal Air Force
- Service years: 1929–1956
- Rank: Wing Commander
- Nickname: Taffy
- Unit: No. 56 Squadron RAF
- Conflicts: Second World War: Battle of Dunkirk; Battle of Britain
- Awards: Officer of the Order of the British Empire; Distinguished Flying Cross; Distinguished Flying Medal
- Other work: Director, Bristol Aircraft Ltd

Wing Commander Frederick "Taffy" Higginson, OBE, DFC, DFM (17 February 1913 – 12 February 2003) was a fighter ace of the Royal Air Force during the Second World War.

Higginson was part of the deployment which went to Dunkirk in 1940, where he became an ace within the first six months of the war. Awarded the Distinguished Flying Medal and commissioned as a flight lieutenant, by the time he was shot down over Lille in 1941, he had reached a tally of 15 victories. After capture, escape to Vichy France, and recapture, he returned to England via Monte Carlo and Spain. Returning to operations in late 1942, he used his knowledge in training new pilots and developing improved strategies and tactics.

== Early life ==
Frederick William Higginson was the son of a policeman, born into a Welsh language-speaking family in Gorseinon, Swansea, on 17 February 1913. Educated at Gowerton Grammar School, he joined the RAF straight from school as an apprentice in 1929, aged 16. Assigned for training at RAF Halton, he was allocated service number: 44630. In 1932 he was posted as a fitter-airgunner to No 7 Bomber Squadron.

== RAF career ==
=== Pre-war pilot ===
Accepted for pilot training in 1935, on completion of training he joined the Gloster Gauntlet-equipped No. 19 Squadron RAF the following year, and then quickly moved to C Flight to form No. 66 Squadron RAF. Selected to play rugby for the RAF from 1936, in 1937 he moved to the Gloster Gladiator-equipped No. 56 Squadron RAF, which was then re-equipped with the brand new Hawker Hurricane monoplane fighter.

=== Battle of Britain ===
Promoted to flight sergeant in 1940 he was sent to Dunkirk, France with "B" Flight. He scored his first victories on 17 May, downing a Do 17 of KG 76 near Douai and a He 111 of KG 54 near Cambrai. After recording four victories in the Battle of France, he returned to England and was awarded the Distinguished Flying Medal on 27 July 1940, during the Battle of Britain. Having already destroyed at least five enemy aircraft, the citation stated:

Despite being an airman pilot, he led a section of 56 Squadron during all operations, his determination in the face of the enemy and his cool and courageous leadership being an example to his squadron

Between 12 August and 30 September, he accounted for a further nine enemy aircraft, reaching a total of at least 15 victories destroyed or damaged.

On 16 August, after sustaining damage from return fire from a Dornier Do 17 that he had critically damaged, he crash-landed his Hurricane Mk I (P3547) near Whitstable. On 18 August 1940 his Hurricane was again damaged in combat off the Essex coast.

One of his victories during this period was supposedly the Bf 109 of Hans Mellangrau over the Thames Estuary. Higginson recalled the fight 60 years later, when the pair met up at a Battle of Britain memorial event:

I saw this Messerschmitt coming towards me and suddenly we were face to face. After he hit my Hurricane's engine with incendiary bullets I shot him down and he crash-landed in a field. By this time his incendiaries had set my engine on fire and I actually crash-landed alongside him

=== Shot down ===
On 17 June 1941, as part of the close escort for No.2 Group light bombers raiding Lille, Higginson was shot down. The cause was never established, (anti-aircraft fire or enemy fighters) although Bf 109's of JG 26 claimed 11 Hurricanes of both No.56 and No.242 Squadrons (7 were actually lost). In the resulting explosion Higginson's control column snapped at the base, his left boot was torn off and his trousers were shredded.

Higginson landed in a wood 12 miles (19 km) northwest of Fauquembergues, where he was quickly rounded up by a German Army officer and sergeant who arrived on a motorcycle and sidecar combination. Placed in the sidecar, while his captors were distracted by a low-flying Bf 109, Higginson managed to crash the motorcycle and sidecar into a ditch, and ran off.

Hiding that night in a wood, Higginson made his way to an occupied hut, where he gained clothes and some cash from the owner. Waking into Fauquembergues, he ordered a beer in his limited French. Hitching a lift with a lorry driver, he was taken to a local garage whose owner had contacts with an escape line for Allied airmen. Introduced to British Army Captain Harold "Paul" Cole, a fellow survivor of the Battle of Dunkirk and local coordinator of the underground escape route, Cole took him to local priest Abbé Carpentier in Abbeville, who provided Higginson with false identity papers. Higginson then travelled to Paris, where he lodged in a brothel until July 1941.

To allow Higginson to exit via Vichy France to Spain, Cole escorted him on a train journey via Tours and St Martin-le-Beau, where at the station they were questioned by German officers. Not convinced by the story that Higginson was an idiot seeking work, on searching his valise they were unable to find further evidence as its contents were smothered by chocolate which had melted in the summer heat. They also failed to find the pistol and British passports in Cole's luggage, as it was wrapped in dirty laundry. Cole left Higginson at the Marseille home of Greek doctor Georges Rodocanochi and his wife, who operated a safe house for Pat O'Leary's MI9 section.

After Cole returned to northern France, Dr Rodocanochi told Higginson that he had discovered that Cole was not in fact a British Army captain, but a sergeant who had absconded with mess funds. Later, having been captured by the Germans, Cole informed on Father Carpentier, who was subsequently executed.

==== Recapture ====
Impatient at being out of the action, Higginson caught a train to Perpignan, where with an Australian Army Corporal they persuaded a Catalan to guide them to Spain. Stopped by gendarmes and found to have false papers, Higginson struck one of them. Imprisoned for six months, he was retained in reprisal for a further period after a 5 March 1942, RAF raid on the Renault factory at Boulogne-Billancourt. Placed in Fort de la Revere above Monte Carlo on 17 March he decided to assume the name Captain Bennett as he believed the Germans disliked airmen.

==== Return home ====
On discovering his retention, and with the RAF short of experienced pilots, MI9 urged O'Leary to get a group of pilots including Higginson back to Britain, under the Special Operations Executive's Operation Titania. Using Polish priest Father Myrda as a go-between, O'Leary smuggled a hacksaw blade into the prison. On the night of 6 August during a noisy inmate-contrived concert in the forts courtyard, Higginson and four other pilots escaped through a coal shute, and out of the fort via an operational sewer. Reaching Cap d'Ail without his supplied ID card, Higginson reached the Scottish tea house in Monte Carlo, a safe house run by spinster Eva Trenchard.

Disguised as priests and accompanied by Father Myrda, the group reached Marseille. Now accompanied by French underground operatives to Canet Plage, 11 kilometres (6.8 mi) due east of Perpignan, it was chosen because the two safe houses – the Hotel du Tennis and Villa Anitawas – could accommodate the 25 man group of agents and pilots. On 17 September the group were picked up from the beach by a dingy from the Q-ship Tarana, a Polish fishing trawler also called the Seawolf. Transferred to the SOE fast patrol boat HMS Minna, she returned to her base in Gibraltar, from where Higginson was flown home to RAF Greenock on 5 October 1942.

=== End of the war ===
To enable him to return to No. 56 Squadron RAF, Higginson retrained on the Hawker Typhoon before being attached to Napier & Son, resolving production issues on the Napier Sabre engine installed on the Hawker Typhoon.

He was awarded the Distinguished Flying Cross in July 1943, the citation stating:

He has now destroyed at least 12 enemy aircraft and throughout has displayed great skill and courage in combat with the enemy

In mid-1944 he was posted to 83 Group Communications Squadron until 1946 when he was posted to No. 11 Group RAF, Headquarters Fighter Command at RAF Bentley Priory.

=== Postwar career ===
Sent to the RAF Staff College, Bracknell in 1948, on graduation he was appointed personal staff officer to the Air Officer Commanding-in-Chief, RAF Training Command. In 1951 he joined the staff of the Army Staff College, Camberley. Promoted wing commander from 1952, he served on the operational requirements staff, also taking a helicopter course.

== After the RAF ==
In 1956 Higginson resigned from the RAF to join the newly demerged Bristol Aircraft Ltd, based in London as its military liaison officer. He played rugby for London Welsh, Richmond and Surrey until he was 40. Appointed sales and service director of the Guided Missiles Division, he was responsible for export sales of the newly developed ground-to-air missile defence system, Bloodhound. In 1963 he joined the board of Bristol Aircraft then in the New Year Honours 1964 Higginson was appointed as an Officer of the Order of the British Empire for services to industry.

Having met Kuwaiti businessman Abdullah Alireza, in 1964 he left Bristol Aircraft to launch Rezayat Services' London office, building a substantial business for the Kuwaiti's European company.

== Retirement ==
After retiring in 1969 he bought Pen-y-Coed, a 250-acre farm estate with a large 17th-century house, in Carmarthenshire. He lived there with his wife Jenny "Shan" Jenkins, whom he had married in 1937, and his four sons. His wife predeceased him in August 2002, while Higginson died on 12 February 2003.

== Memorial ==
Higginson was remembered at his old school in Swansea, with the unveiling of a plaque in November 2010.
