= Hans Wolff (aviator) =

German flying ace

Hanns Joachim Wolff
- Born: 24 September 1895; Mühlhausen
- Died: 16 May 1918 (aged 22); Near Lamotte
- Military career
- Allegiance: German Empire
- Branch: Luftstreitkräfte
- Rank: Leutnant
- Units: FFA 216; Jagdstaffel 11
- Awards: Iron Cross

Leutnant Hanns Joachim Wolff was a World War I German flying ace credited with ten aerial victories.

== Early life ==
Hans Joachim Wolff was born in Mühlhausen, the German Empire, on 24 September 1895.

== Aerial service ==
Wolff served with FA(A) 216 until 6 July 1917, when he was reassigned to Jagdstaffel 11. He was wounded in action fighting No. 1 Squadron RNAS on 14 August, and again on 23 November in combat against No. 56 Squadron RFC. On 18 March 1918, Wolff shot down and killed his first victim, which was possibly Lt. John McCudden. Wolff then steadily scored for the next two months, downing his tenth victim on 15 May 1918. He and his Fokker Dr.I were shot down the following day, most probably by Lt. Horace Barton of No. 24 Squadron RAF. He was the only German pilot who scored all of his victories in the Fokker Dr.I.
