= Ulrich Neckel =

German flying ace

- Born: 23 January 1898; Güstrow, Grand Duchy of Mecklenburg-Schwerin
- Died: 11 May 1928 (aged 30); Arco, Trentino, Italy
- Military career
- Allegiance: German Empire
- Branch: Luftstreitkräfte
- Service years: 1916–1918
- Rank: Leutnant
- Units: Justa 12; Jasta 13
- Commands: Jasta 19; Jasta 6
- Conflicts: World War I
- Awards: Pour le Mérite; Iron Cross

Ulrich Neckel (23 January 1898 – 11 May 1928) Pour le Mérite, Iron Cross First and Second Class, was a World War I fighter ace credited with 30 victories.

== Early life and enlistment ==
Ulrich Neckel was born in Güstrow, part of the Grand Duchy of Mecklenburg-Schwerin, in northeastern Germany. He enlisted aged 18 in an artillery regiment. After extensive service in Russia he then transferred to flying service in November 1916.

== Flying in World War I ==
Neckel joined FA 25 in early 1917, flying two-seaters on the Eastern Front. Undergoing single-seat fighter training in August. He was assigned to Prussian Jagdstaffel 12 on 8 September 1917 with the rank of Gefreiter.This unit was one of four in Jagdgeschwader II under command of ace Adolf Ritter von Tutschek. On the 21 September, Neckel claimed his first victory, a Sopwith Pup of 46 Squadron. A week later, he shot down an Airco D.H.5. A third victory on 18 October followed. Neckel was privileged during his time with Jasta 12. He had a choice of personal airplanes to fly. Both an Albatros and a Fokker Dr.I triplane bore his personal insignia on white chevrons on the fuselage.

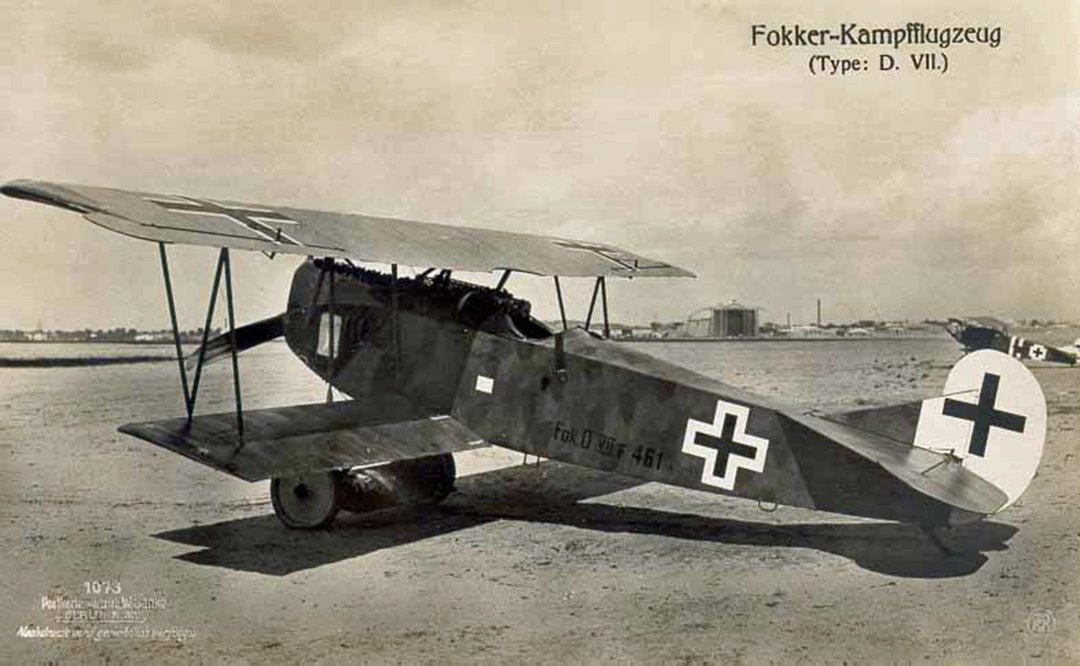
A Fokker D.VII, much like one of the planes that Neckel flew.

Neckel's next achieved a victory on 18 January 1918 and steadily accumulated claims, with his fifth on 26 February. His next victory was over an ace, Lt. John McCudden of 84 Squadron who survived. He scored his tenth on 21 April, making him a 'kanone'. The twenty-year-old Neckel was now a Vizefeldwebel and was commissioned Leutnant in April 1918. At about this time, he transferred to Prussian Jasta 13.

June 1918 was Neckel's greatest month, as he notched up eight victories, and added two more in July. On 12 August Neckel was appointed by Jagdgeschwader 2 Commander Rudolf Berthold to provisionally command Jasta 19. The following day saw Neckel's down 29-kill ace Major Charles Dawson Booker. Booker died gallantly, fighting six to one odds to preserve the life of the rookie pilot with him. This was Neckel's 22nd victory.

Neckel proved a competent Jasta commander. On 1 September, Neckel was posted to command Prussian Jasta 6 in the famed "Flying Circus" of JG 1. His 30th claim, scored on 6 November, would result in the award of the Pour le Mérite on the 8th. It was the penultimate Blue Max awarded in World War I.

Neckel flew a Fokker D.VII with a teddy bear luck charm perched atop his rear view mirror.

In his 30 victories, he was responsible for at least a dozen deaths; yet the twenty-year-old ace sought out and shook hands with his final victim, Lieutenant Ben E. Brown.

== Death ==
Ulrich Neckel survived the war, only to succumb to tuberculosis while in Arco. He was buried in Berlin. He was 30 years old.

In the 1930s, Lufthansa named one of its Junkers Ju 52 passenger airliners after Neckel.
