= Rezayat =

Group of companies headquartered in Saudi Arabia

Rezayat Group
- Company type: Private
- Industry: Engineering & Contracting, Industrial, Logistics and Hospitality
- Founded: 1949; 77 years ago
- Founder: Abdullah Alireza
- Headquarters: Khobar, Saudi Arabia
- Area served: Worldwide
- Key people: Shakeeb Alireza (Executive Chairman); Anand Krish Ramani (GCFO); Youssef Merjaneh (GCOO)
- Number of employees: 16,000
- Website: www.rezayat.com

Rezayat Group is a group of companies which are headquartered in Al-Khobar, Saudi Arabia. Originally called Ali Reza Group, it was founded by Abdullah Alireza in 1949 in the British Protectorate of Kuwait. The Rezayat Group is active in the industries of oil & gas, water, power generation, engineering and transportation, with over 16,000 employees and operations in 13 countries. Of its 25 companies, 14 are wholly owned and 11 joint ventures with major international partners. It is a family-owned business descended from the House of Alireza trading family.

== History ==
Abdullah Alireza was a member of the prominent House of Alireza merchant family with trading interests in the Gulf and India. Abdullah was educated in Bombay and began his career as the secretary for Karl Twitchell, Director of the Saudi Arabian Mining Syndicate. Twitchell had previously been the local representative of California-Arabian Standard Oil Company (CASOC), one of the four partners which in May 1933 created what is now Saudi Aramco.

Abdullah became liaison officer for CASOC, serving King AbdulAziz as an interpreter, most notably at the historic ceremony in Dhahran on 1 May 1939, when the King turned the wheel to load the first shipment of Saudi oil. During a trip to Iran during the Second World War, Abdullah was asked to join the Allied administration with responsibility for the distribution of essential foodstuffs and supplies throughout the country.

On a visit to Kuwait in 1949, Abdullah saw opportunities to develop business in the Kuwait-Saudi Arabia Neutral Zone. He decided to base the Group in Kuwait, and with the help of his sons, Teymour and Fahd, steadily expanded its operations into other Gulf states, in addition to Saudi Arabia, where the Group's headquarters are now located. The Group built up important relationships with major Western and Asian contractors and industrial companies, which provided not just a solid foundation for its growth in the Middle East, but also a springboard for its expansion into other continents.

The group was known as the Ali Reza Group until 2005 but, since this caused confusion with a similarly named Reza Group in Jeddah, it was decided to use the name Rezayat to give a distinct identity.

== Activities ==
The Rezayat Group consists of 25 companies:

- 15 wholly owned
- 10 joint ventures
- Over 16,000 employees

=== Group activities ===
- Trading
- Manufacturing
- Construction, Contracting and Engineering
- Industrial Services
- Logistics & Transportation
- Catering & Facilities Management
- Finance
- Insurance & Risk Management
- IT & Telecommunications

=== Primary target markets ===
- Oil, Gas and Petrochemicals
- Water
- Electricity
- Finance
- Information Technology

== Logo and identity ==
The company logo is four blue colored letter "A"'s which represents the first letters of the founders name and also symbolizes the oil drill heads which were to be found in Saudi Arabia.

Each company within the group has its own identity and branding.

== See also ==
- List of companies of Saudi Arabia
