= House of Alireza =

Commercial enterprise in Saudi Arabia

The House of Alireza, founded in 1845, is reputed to be Saudi Arabia's oldest organized commercial enterprise. The family arrived in Jeddah in the 1840s, from Laristan in southern Iran. Its founder, Zainal Alireza, started off trading food, textiles, and other merchandise from the Middle East and the Indian subcontinent. They also acted as agents for pilgrims on the hajj for one of the larger British-Indian shipping lines.

The House was an early backer of Abdulaziz al Saud, the first king of Saudi Arabia, and has been active in Saudi Arabian politics since the end of the Ottoman Empire. Qasim bin Zainal Alireza was elected as the deputy for Jeddah within the Ottoman parliament of 1908, and his uncle Abdullah Alireza Zainal served as kaymakam, equivalent to governor, of Jeddah during the Hashemite and the early years of al Saud rule. Abdullah Alireza later became a senior advisor to King Abdullah bin Abdulaziz. Abdullah Alireza Zainal's son, Muhammad, became the second Minister of Commerce from 1953 to 1958, and later served as the Saudi ambassador to Egypt and France. Another of Zainal Alireza's sons, Muhammad Ali Zainal Alireza, established two schools, first in Jeddah in 1905 and then in Mecca in 1912, for poor children and did not charge any tuition fee. As the country was still in the Ottoman Empire, the language of instruction was Ottoman Turkish. Further schools were opened, but were closed due to violations of British laws. Following the establishment of the schools, Muhammad Ali went on to establish himself as a successful pearl merchant in Paris and Bombay by importing Persian Gulf pearls to both Europe and India.

The House of Alireza has since expanded its businesses to include real estate, representative agency rights for the shippers that delivered their cargo and joint ventures with construction and engineering companies with whom they contributed to the Saudi Arabian infrastructural development. In 1929, the business was renamed Haji Abdullah Alireza & Co., and received first commercial registration in Saudi Arabia (license number 1). In 1940, the House of Alireza beat out Harry St John Philby for rights to the first Ford dealership in the kingdom, and quickly went on to acquire the rights of other prominent Western brands such as Pepsi Cola, Goodyear, and Dunlop. In 2003 the company was incorporated into a limited liability company and began to expand its operations into new areas, such as real estate, telecommunication, tourism, travel, and maritime services.

Zainal Alireza's grandson, Ahmed Alireza, died in 2012. His surviving sons, Khaled, Mohammed, Abdullah, Hisham, Yousef and his daughter Mariam, as well as some of their children, Aamer, Hatim and Sulaiman serve as executives for a number of the House of Alireza's commercial interests, including SISCO, Tusdeer, and Xenel (a phonetic homage to Zainal Alireza).

== Family Tree ==
Family Tree of House of Alireza

Zainal Alireza	Abdullah Alireza Zainal
Qasim bin Zainal Alireza	Muhammad Ali Zainal Alireza	Muhammad
Yousuf Zainal Alireza	Muhammed Abdullah Alireza
Ahmed Yousuf Alireza; 1915-2012
Khaled	Mohammed	Abdullah	Hisham	Yousef	Mariam
