= No. 56 Squadron RAF =

Flying squadron of the Royal Air Force

- Squadron badge
- Active: 1916–1918 (RFC); 1918–1920; 1920–1922; 1922–1946; 1946–1922; 1992–2008; 2008–present
- Country: United Kingdom
- Branch: Royal Air Force
- Type: Flying squadron
- Role: Operational evaluation unit
- Part of: No. 1 Group; Air and Space Warfare Centre
- Station: RAF Waddington
- Nicknames: Punjab; Firebirds
- Mottos: Quid si coelum ruat (Latin for 'What if heaven falls?')
- Aircraft: Beechcraft Shadow R1; Boeing RC-135W Rivet Joint; General Atomics Protector RG1

Insignia
- Roundel
- Identification symbol: LR (Apr 1939 – Sep 1939); US (Sep 1939 – Apr 1946; 1947 – Dec 1950); ON (Apr 1946 – 1947) (ex 124 Sqn); A–Z (Mar 1976 – July 1992); AA–AZ (July 1992 – Apr 2008)

Number 56 Squadron, also known as No. 56 Test and Evaluation Squadron (TES), nicknamed the Firebirds for their ability to always reappear intact regardless of the odds, is one of the oldest and most successful squadrons of the Royal Air Force, with battle honours from many of the significant air campaigns of both the First and Second World Wars.

During the First World War, the squadron had many aces amongst its ranks such as James McCudden, Albert Ball, Reginald Hoidge and Arthur Rhys-Davids, developing a fierce reputation for the unit. In the Second World War, they fought in the Battle of Britain, and operated as a successful fighter-bomber unit for most of the war. In the 1960s, the squadron had their own aerobatic display team, 'The Firebirds', which consisted of nine English Electric Lightning F.1As, which participated at many airshows. From March 1976 to July 1992, No. 56 (Fighter) Squadron operated the McDonnell Douglas Phantom FGR.2, flying from RAF Wattisham, Suffolk, becoming the penultimate unit to fly the type. Until 18 April 2008, the squadron was the Operational Conversion Unit for the Panavia Tornado F.3 at RAF Leuchars, Fife.

Since 22 April 2008, the squadron has been based at RAF Waddington, Lincolnshire, and serves as the Air Command and Control Intelligence, Surveillance and Reconnaissance Operational Evaluation Unit (AIR C2ISR OEU) for the RAF.

== History ==
=== First World War ===
No. 56 Squadron was formed on 8 June 1916 at Fort Rowner, Gosport, from members of No. 28 Squadron, as part of the Royal Flying Corps (RFC). On 14 July, the squadron relocated to London Colney. No. 56 Squadron received its first aircraft, a Royal Aircraft Factory B.E.2c on 7 August, which was followed by numerous other types. Captain Albert Ball joined No. 56 Squadron as a Flight Commander in February 1917. On 13 March 1917, the squadron became the first unit in the entire RFC to be equipped with the then brand new Royal Aircraft Factory S.E.5 fighter.

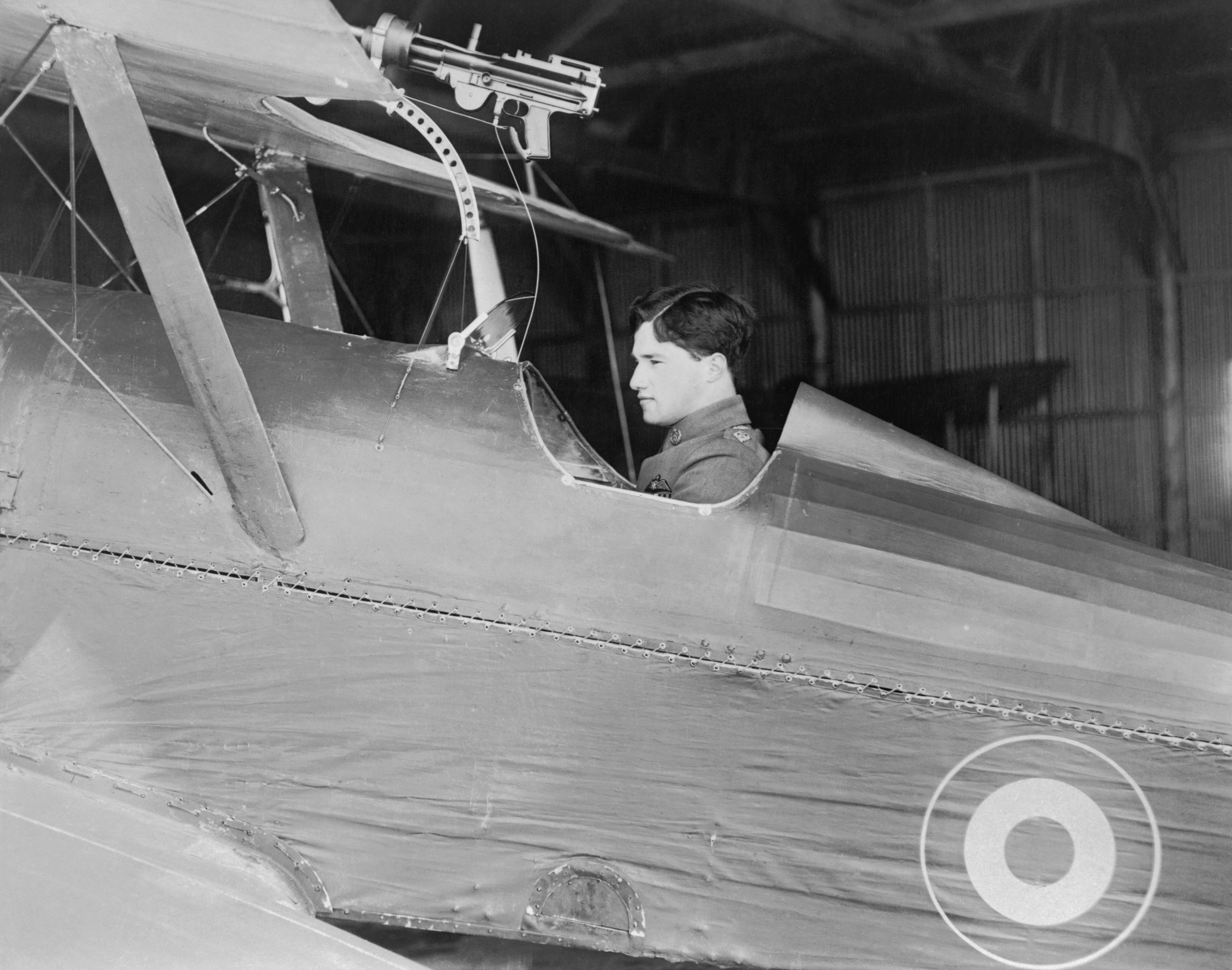
Albert Ball in a No. 56 Squadron S.E.5 in April 1917.

On 31 March, No. 56 Squadron received orders to relocate to the RFC HQ at Saint-Omer, France. By 8 April, the entire Squadron had made the move from London Colney, with the pilots having their photograph in their S.E.5s taken before they left on the 7 April. From Saint-Omer, the squadron relocated to Vert Galant on 20 April to support the Second Battle of Arras and flew their first mission on the 22 April. Its arrival at the front with the latest fighter, combined with the unusually high proportion of experienced pilots in its ranks, led to rumours among its German opponents that the squadron was an 'Anti-Richthofen Squadron', specifically dedicated to the removal of the Red Baron. The squadron did shoot down and kill Richthofen's nearest 1917 rival Leutnant Werner Voss in an epic dogfight, on 23 September 1917 by Lieutenant Arthur Rhys-Davids. Albert Ball scored No. 56 Squadron's first kill, his 32nd, on 23 April, when he shot down an Albatros D.III. The squadron suffered its first loss on 30 April when Lieutenant Maurice Alfred Kay was shot down. Ball himself was killed in action on 7 May, the same day as Lieutenant Roger Michael Chaworth-Musters.

No. 56 Squadron was sent north to Estrée-Blanche on 31 May 1917, to provide support for the upcoming Battle of Messines. From May 1917, the Germans began bombing London using their new Gotha G.IV bombers – with the first raid occurring on 25 May inflicting 290 casualties in London and Folkestone (due to diversion); the second raid was aborted and focused on Kent; the third was a daytime raid on 13 June in which there were 594 casualties, which went unanswered with the Germans losing no bombers. In response to this, No. 56 Squadron was recalled back to England and based at RFC Bekesbourne on 21 June.

The squadron participated in the Battle of Passchendaele, marking numerous victories throughout it. Captain James McCudden, eventual highest scoring pilot of the squadron, joined on 13 August. Rhys-Davids made his final sortie on 27 October 1917, taking off for a routine patrol he chased after a group of Albatros fighters after which he was never seen again. The Luftstreitkräfte credited Karl Gallwitz with the kill, word only reached the RFC on 29 December that Rhys-Davids had been killed. On 18 November, No. 56 Squadron was relocated to Laviéville in support of the Battle of Cambrai. In December 1917, McCudden scored 14 victories – including 4 on 23 December, a first for the RFC.

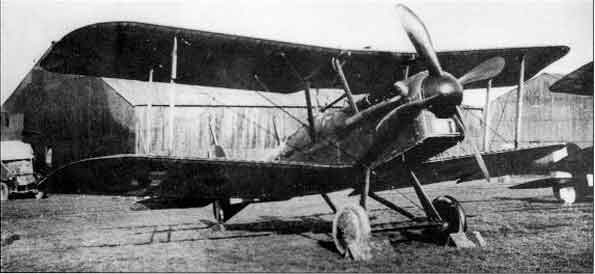
James McCudden's Royal Aircraft Factory S.E.5a, sporting the propeller spinner from one of his victims, 1918.

In January 1918, the squadron moved to Baizieux. McCudden was sent back to England on 5 March, where he was promoted to Major and received the Victoria Cross, he died on 9 July in an accident while on his way to take command of No. 60 Squadron. On 21 March, the Germans began their Spring Offensive, this forced No. 56 Squadron to pull back to Valheureux, where from they conducted air-to-air patrols for the next four months. The squadron supported the buildup to and provided support during the Battle of Amiens (beginning 8 August), which would later be known as the start of the Hundred Days Offensive. On 1 August, No. 56 Squadron, in tandem with No. 3 Squadron, attacked a German aerodrome in which 6 hangars and 16 enemy aircraft were destroyed.

By the end of the war, No. 56 Squadron had scored 427 victories, at a cost of 40 pilots killed, 20 wounded and 31 taken prisoner. A good impression of the demobilisation of the squadron is given in the final pages of Wind in the Wires by Duncan Grinnell-Milne, the squadron's last CO.

The squadron tune during the later stages of the war was The Darktown Strutters' Ball.

=== Interwar years ===
On 22 November 1918, No. 56 Squadron moved to Béthencourt, France. It stayed here until it moved back to Britain on 15 February 1919, arriving at RAF Narborough along with No. 60 Squadron and No. 64 Squadron.

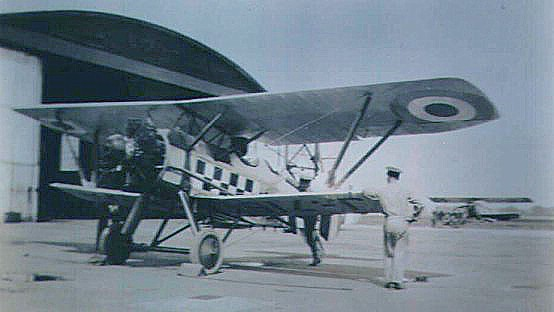
No. 56 Squadron Armstrong Whitworth Siskin Mk.IIIa, at RAF North Weald.

Only days after being disbanded, No. 80 Squadron, based at RAF Aboukir, in Egypt, was renumbered on 1 February 1920 to No. 56 Squadron. From here they flew Sopwith Snipes. The squadron was disbanded again on 23 September 1922; however, one flight was hastily reformed on 26 September and sent to Turkey for the Chanak Crisis. This flight was officially attached to No. 208 Squadron and remained in Turkey until August 1923. However it continued to use the 56 numberplate, even though No. 56 Squadron had reformed officially in November 1922 at RAF Hawkinge. This flight returned and rejoined the rest of the squadron at RAF Biggin Hill. In September 1924, No. 56 Squadron was assigned a red and white checker pattern as a means of squadron identification, something which the squadron would actively use up until 2008. The same month saw the squadron convert to the Gloster Grebe Mk.II, flying them until they were exchanged for Armstrong Whitworth Siskin Mk.IIIas in September 1927.

The squadron finally settled at RAF North Weald in October 1927, where it remained until the end of 1939 and the start of the Second World War. On 14 November 1928, the No. 56 Squadron was allowed to use a phoenix for its crest along with the motto Quid si coelum ruat. The squadron converted to the Bristol Bulldog Mk.IIa in October 1932, these were kept until May 1936 when the squadron received Gloster Gauntlet Mk.IIs. No. 56 Squadron's crest and motto were officially approved by King Edward VIII in July 1936.

No. 56 Squadron converted to their last biplane, the Gloster Gladiator Mk.I, in July 1937. The Gladiators were flown up until May 1938 when the squadron acquired Hawker Hurricane Mk.Is. The squadron would operate the Hurricane in the opening stages of WW2.

=== Second World War ===
No. 56 Squadron's introduction to the Second World War came on 6 September 1939. The Firebirds, then based at RAF North Weald, were the victims of a friendly fire incident by No. 74 Squadron known as the Battle of Barking Creek. Two pilots of the squadron were shot down and one, P/O Montague Hulton-Harrop, was killed, becoming the RAF's first casualty in the defence of the UK. (Note: First casualties of the RAF were crews from Bomber Command.)

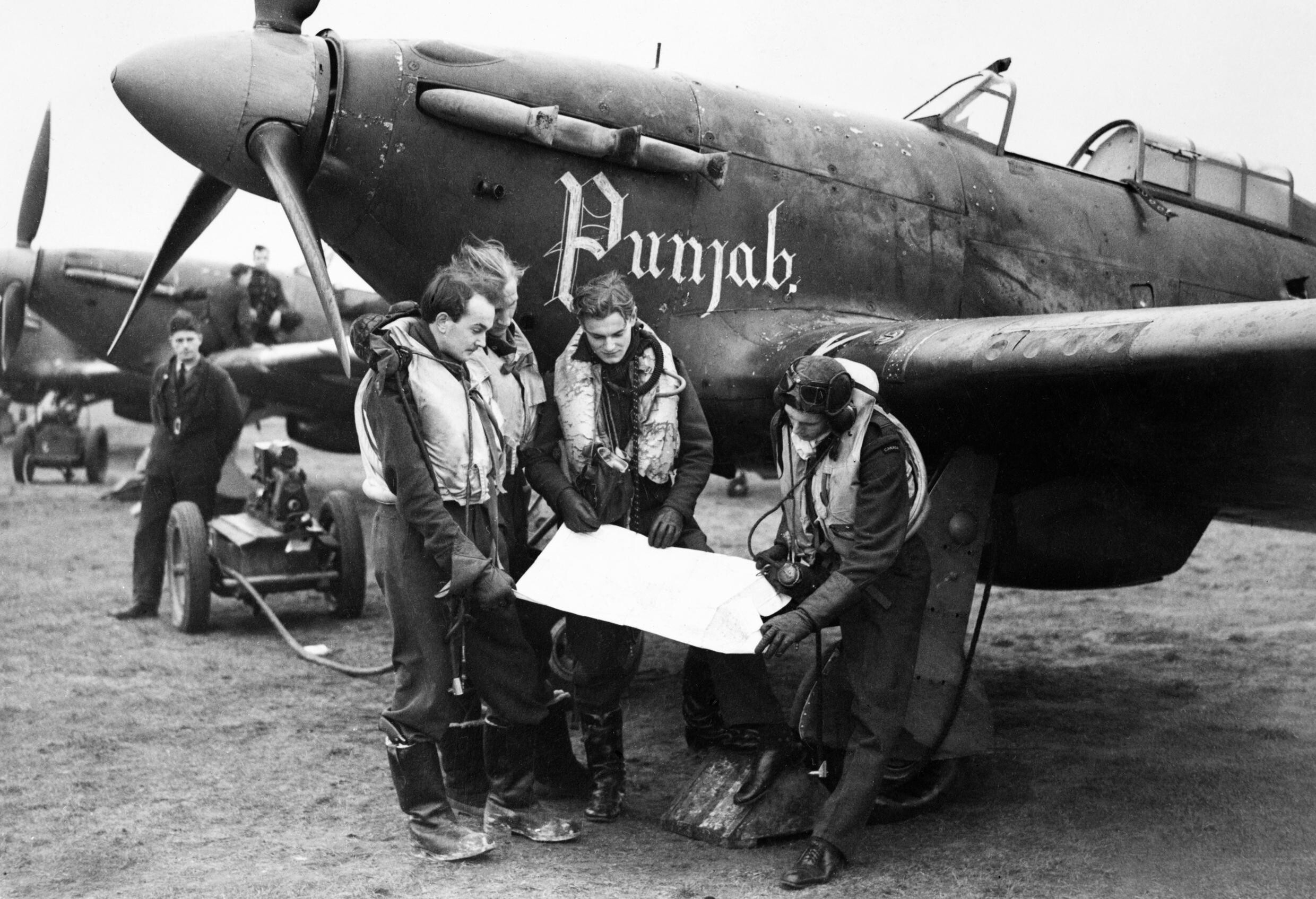
Pilots and Hawker Hurricane Mk.IIbs of No. 56 'Punjab' Squadron at RAF Duxford, 2 January 1942.

The squadron entered the Second World War equipped with the Hawker Hurricane Mk.I and first saw action during the Battle of France, although they remained based in England and sent flights to France for short periods. The Firebirds ended the campaign by covering the Dunkirk evacuation. As part of No. 11 Group, No. 56 Squadron was based at RAF North Weald at the beginning of the Battle of Britain. From there the squadron first engaged German aircraft on 31 July 1940. It was heavily involved in the fighting in the south of England during August, although the squadron moved to RAF Boscombe Down on the 1 September. It was one of the few fighter squadrons to remain based in the south of England continuously through the battle, scoring 59 kills by the end.

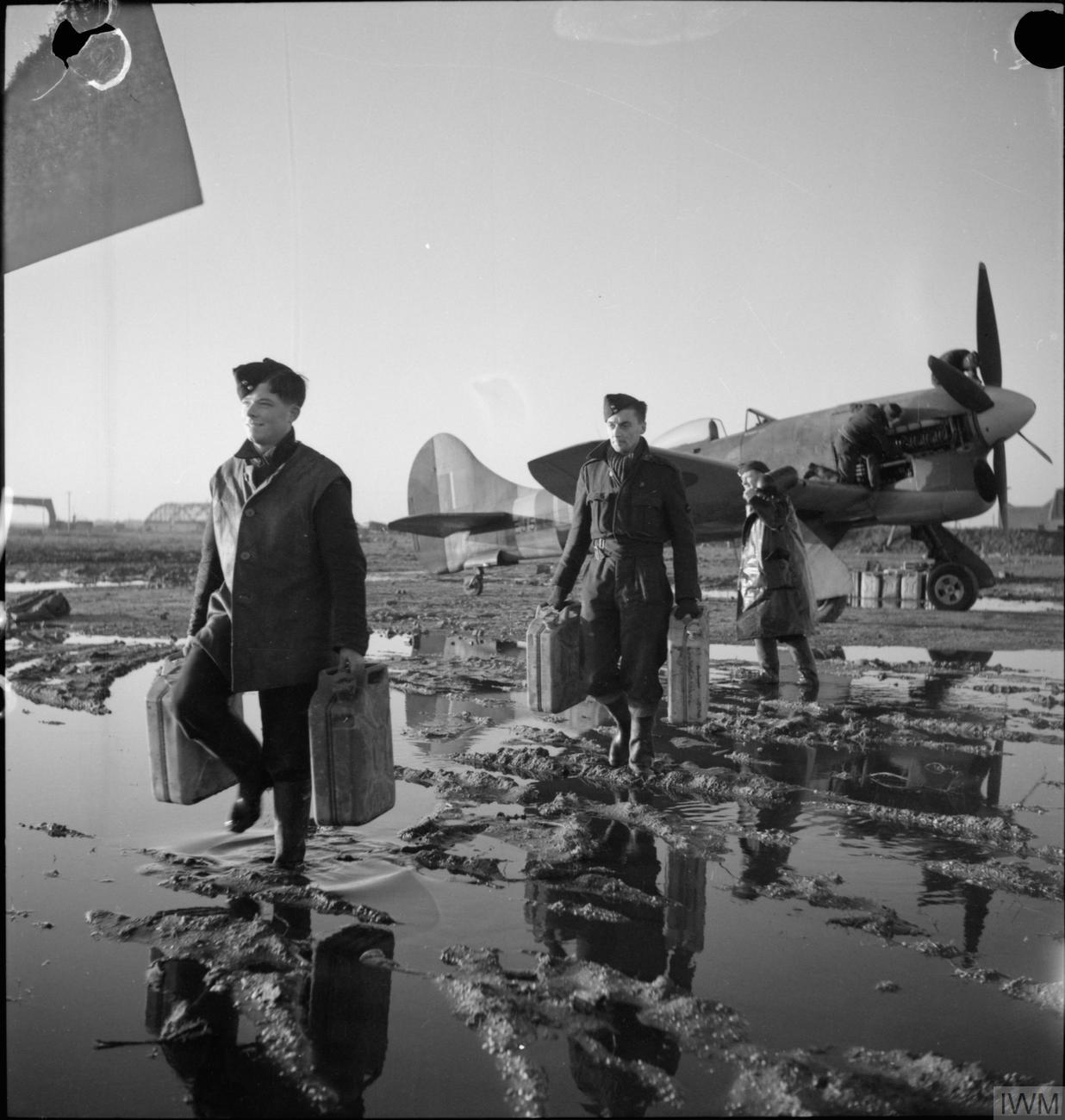
No. 56 Squadron Hawker Tempest Mk.V undergoing servicing while at Volkel, circa 1944-45.

The squadron relocated away from RAF Boscombe Down on 29 November to RAF Middle Wallop where they stayed until 17 December when the Firebirds returned to RAF North Weald in Essex. It was while based here that No. 56 Squadron upgraded to the Hurricane Mk.IIb in February 1941. In April 1941, No. 56 Squadron gained its 'Punjab' nickname after the Indian province of Punjab raised money to have their name attached to a fighter, thus becoming an Indian 'gift' squadron. The Firebirds then relocated for a brief stay at RAF Martlesham Heath, Suffolk on 23 July before settling at RAF Duxford on 26 July.

In September 1941, No. 56 Squadron became the first unit to receive the Hawker Typhoon Mk.Ia which, although troublesome to begin with, the squadron helped turn into a usable fighter. Before leaving RAF Duxford, the squadron upgraded to the Typhoon Mk.Ib in March 1942, moving to RAF Snailwell on 30 March. From 24 August 1942 to 22 July 1943, the unit was based with No. 12 Group at RAF Matlaske in Norfolk. During this time, No. 56 Squadron's role changed from that of low-level defence against Focke-Wulf Fw 190 and Messerschmitt Bf 109 fighter-bomber attacks into becoming fighter bombers themselves, attacking ground and sea targets. With the Firebirds using bombs from November 1943 and rockets from February 1944. No. 56 Squadron was to score one confirmed victory while flying Typhoons. After moving around multiple bases in the UK, the squadron moved up to RAF Scorton, Yorkshire on 7 April 1944, where they converted to the Supermarine Spitfire Mk.IX. From here the squadron flew escort and reconnaissance missions.

On 28 April 1944, No. 56 Squadron moved to RAF Newchurch, Kent where the squadron converted to the Hawker Tempest Mk.V in June. Squadron Leader Frederick Higginson left the squadron at this time, being posted to No. 83 Group. Due to his knowledge of the pilot escape routes in France; his total victory count, all with No. 56 Squadron, was 15.

As a unit of No. 150 Wing, under the command of Wing Commander Roland Beamont, No. 56 Squadron became an air defence squadron. It was tasked with defending Britain from V-1 flying bombs – of which between 70 and 77 1/2 were shot down by the squadron. No. 56 Squadron transferred to advance landing ground B.60 at Grimbergen in Belgium on 28 September 1944, becoming part of No. 122 Wing, Second Tactical Air Force. (Note: 122 Wing consisted of 3 Sqn., 56 Sqn., 80 Sqn., 274 Sqn. (to March 1945), and 486(NZ) Sqn.) During subsequent operations No. 56 Squadron was to become the equal highest scoring Tempest unit, with No. 486 (NZ) Squadron, totalling 59 confirmed victories. In the latter months of the war, the Firebirds were deployed to several airfields in Europe: including Volkel, in the Netherlands; Copenhagen; and numerous bases in Germany. During the Second World War, the No. 56 Squadron claimed a total of 149 aircraft shot down.

=== Early Cold War (1946–1960) ===
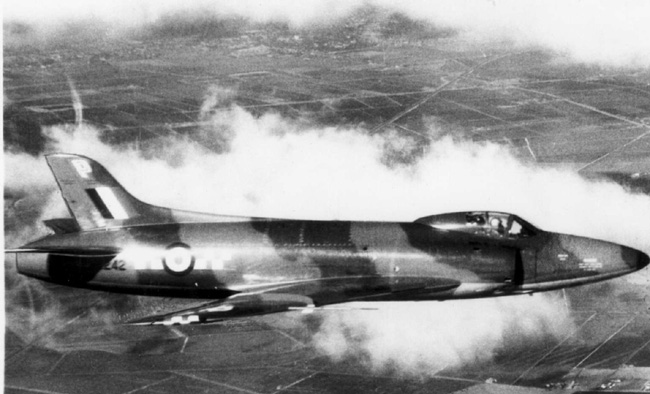
No. 56 (F) Squadron Supermarine Swift F.2 WK242, circa 1954-55.

On 31 March 1946, the No. 56 (Punjab) Squadron nameplate was transferred over to No. 16 Squadron. No. 56 (Fighter) Squadron then reformed the next day, 1 April, at RAF Bentwaters when No. 124 Squadron was renumbered. Upon their reformation, the Firebirds converted to their first jet fighter, the Gloster Meteor F.3. No. 56 (F) Squadron left RAF Bentwaters on 16 September, moving to RAF Boxted. They remained here before relocating on 10 November to RAF Acklington, eventually moving on to RAF Wattisham on 20 December. No. 56 (F) Squadron moved on to RAF Duxford on 17 April 1947 staying there until 31 August before returning once again on 30 November, where they would last until 2 February 1948. The squadron upgraded to the Meteor F.4 in August 1948. The Firebirds settled at RAF Waterbeach on 10 May 1950, where they would operate from for the next nine years. In December 1950, No. 56 (F) Squadron upgraded to the improved Meteor F.8.

In February 1954, No. 56 (F) Squadron became the first, and only, squadron to receive the Supermarine Swift F.1, and the subsequent Swift F.2s they received in August. The squadron evaluated both Swift variants up until March 1955 when the F.1 and F.2s were withdrawn from service due to their poor performance. Continuing to operate the Meteor F.8 after the Swift, No. 56 (F) Squadron finally converted to a new aircraft in May 1955 when they received the Hawker Hunter F.5. On 10 July 1958, the squadron moved to RAF Wattisham, where they would spend some 35 years defending UK airspace, intercepting Tupolev Tu-95 "Bear" aircraft. No. 56 (F) Squadron upgraded to Hunter F.6s in November 1958.

=== The Lightning Years (1960–1976) ===
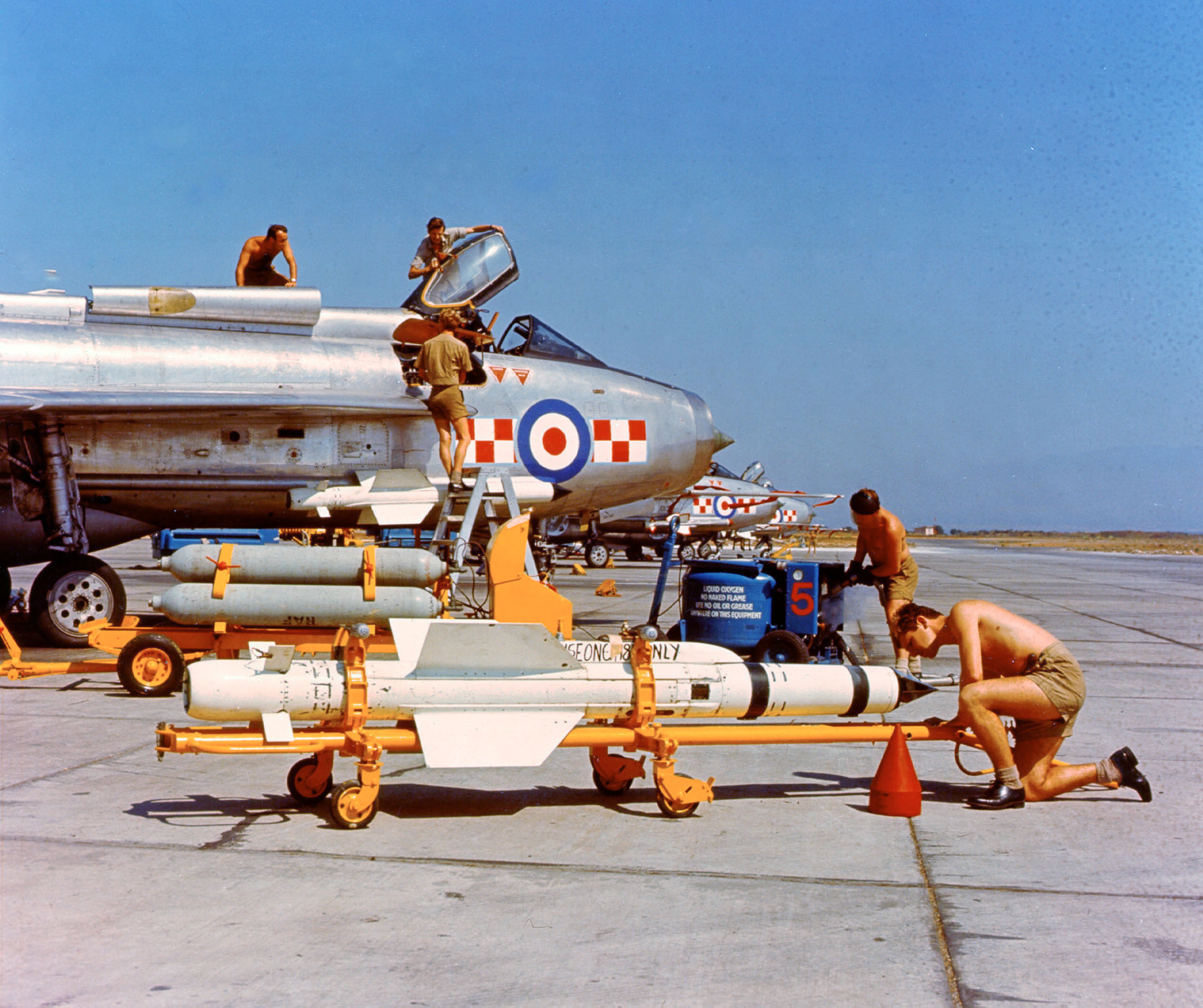
No. 56 (F) Squadron English Electric Lightning F.3 having Firestreak missiles loaded on it at RAF Akrotiri, 1963.

In December 1960, the squadron began to convert to the English Electric Lightning F.1A, with their last Hunters disbanding in January 1961. In 1963, No. 56 (F) Squadron formed a display team called "The Firebirds", flying nine red and silver Lightnings. On 6 June 1963, the display team suffered an accident at RAF Wattisham during preparations for the 25th Paris Air Show. The incident occurred when a pair of Lightnings (XM179 and XM181) collided during a bomb-burst manoeuvre – XM179, piloted by Flt. Lt. Michael Cooke, crashed, while XM181 landed safely. Cooke ejected and was left with severe spinal injuries, after which he used a wheelchair. The Firebirds display team was disbanded in 1964, becoming the last RAF aerobatic team to fly fighter jets. In October 1965, No. 56 (F) Squadron deployed to RAF Luqa, Malta, to participate in an Armament Practice Camp (APC). The following October, the Firebirds deployed once more to Luqa, this time to participate in an air defence exercise alongside Avro Vulcans, English Electric Canberra PR.9s and No. 29 (F) Squadron Gloster Javelin FAW.9s. No. 56 (F) Squadron left RAF Wattisham on 11 May 1967, deploying to RAF Akrotiri in Cyprus.

Between 11 and 20 July 1968, the Firebirds deployed from Akrotiri to Luqa for Exercise Island Litex. In August 1971, the squadron acquired Lightning F.6s after No. 74 (F) Squadron flew them over from RAF Tengah, Singapore before they disbanded. A detachment of four Lightnings deployed to Luqa between 11 and 20 December 1971 to carry out scrambles, night flying and practise in-flight refuelling with a Handley Page Victor K.1A of No. 57 Squadron. The Firebirds deployed two more ten day attachments to RAF Luqa in May 1973 and June 1974. No. 56 (F) Squadron flew extensive top cover over Cyprus during the 1974 Cypriot coup d'état and the subsequent Turkish invasion of the island. The Firebirds returned to RAF Wattisham on 21 January 1975. While based at RAF Akrotiri, No. 56 (F) Squadron also operated a number of Canberras – these included a mixture of T.4s and B.2s.

=== The Phantom Years (1976–1992) ===
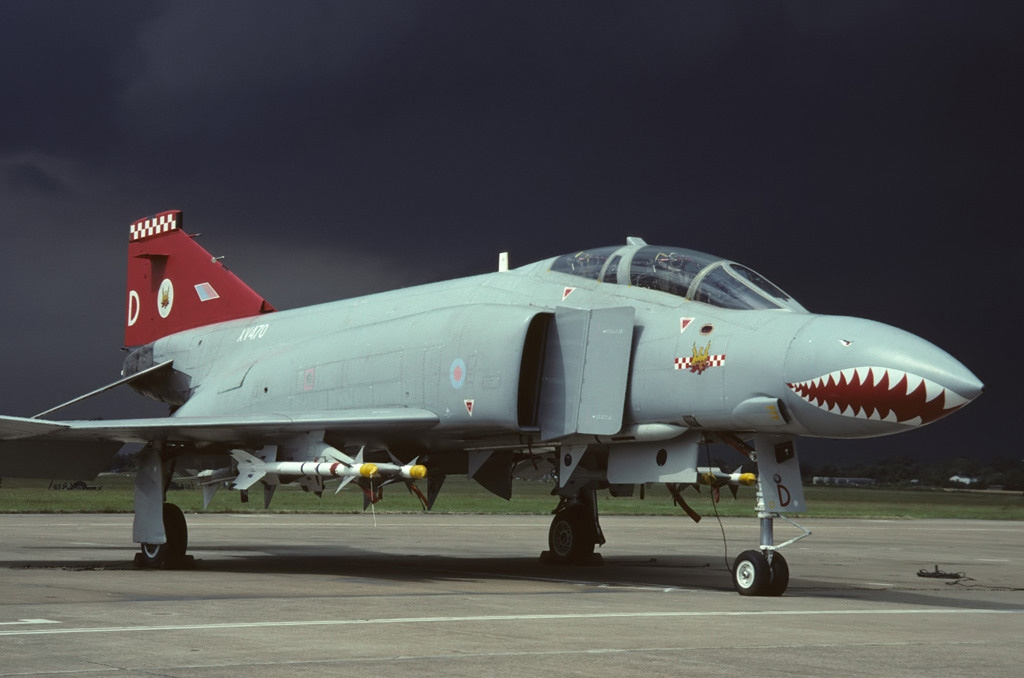
No. 56 (F) Squadron McDonnell Douglas Phantom FGR.2 XV470 at RAF Wattisham, 1992.

On 22 March 1976, No. 56 (Designate) Squadron formed at RAF Coningsby with the McDonnell Douglas Phantom FGR.2. It wasn't until 29 June that the Lightning F.6s were disbanded and the Squadron Standard was formally handed over to RAF Coningsby. No. 56 (Fighter) Squadron returned to RAF Wattisham on 9 July, where they would remain for the next 16 years. Upon their return, The Firebirds found themselves sharing RAF Wattisham with No. 23 (F) Squadron. The squadron deployed to RAF Luqa in Malta for the last time between 13 October and November 1977 with ten Phantom FGR.2s. In October 1978, the Firebirds became the first squadron in the RAF to operate an aircraft in air superiority grey when Phantom FGR.2 XV474 was delivered to RAF Wattisham, marking a change from the old green and grey schemes. On 21 June 1979, Phantom FGR.2 XV424 from No. 56 (F) Squadron re-enacted the transatlantic flight of Alcock and Brown to celebrate its 60th anniversary. The flight was undertaken by pilot, Sqd. Ldr. A. J. N. Alcock (nephew of John Alcock who made the original flight), and navigator, Flt. Lt. W. N. Browne, who brought the original 1919 mascot 'Twinkletoes' with them on their journey. No. 23 (F) Squadron departed RAF Wattisham on 21 March 1983 when their nameplate was passed to No. 29 (F) Squadron at RAF Stanley on the Falkland Islands, from where they provided air defence.

The Firebirds were not alone for long however with No. 74 (F) Squadron reforming at RAF Wattisham on 19 October 1984. The Tigers were equipped with unique F-4J(UK) Phantoms, procured from the United States Navy due to the re-basing of Phantoms to the Falklands. These contrasted with No. 56 (F) Squadron's Phantom FGR.2s which used Rolls-Royce Spey engines, UK MOD Radar systems and other RAF modifications. No. 74 (F) Squadron eventually exchanged their F-4J(UK)s for the Phantom FGR.2 in January 1991, due to their availability from other squadrons converting to the Panavia Tornado F.3. Plans had originally been for the RAF to retain both Phantom squadrons but under the Options for Change defence review in 1990 the decision was made to withdraw both units. Both No. 56 (F) Squadron and No. 74 (F) Squadron participated in their last APC at RAF Akrotiri in early June 1992. On 13 June 1992, the Firebirds and the Tigers participated in Queen Elizabeth II's official birthday flypast, flying over Buckingham Palace with a 16-ship diamond formation, which was made up of eight Phantoms from each squadron. No. 56 (F) Squadron ended their operations at RAF Wattisham at the end of July 1992. No. 74 (F) Squadron would continue to operate there until October 1992 when they stood down and reformed at RAF Valley as a training squadron. RAF Wattisham itself was handed over to the Army Air Corps becoming Wattisham Airfield in March 1993.

=== From Tornados to the Air Warfare Centre ===
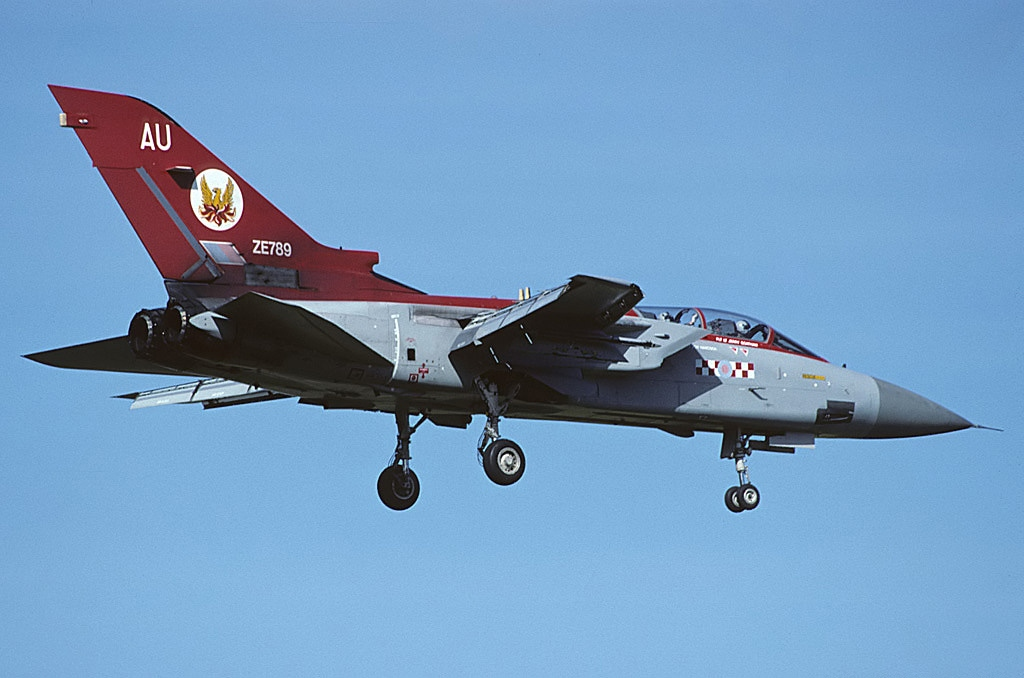
No. 56 (R) Squadron Panavia Tornado F.3 ZE789 over Doncaster Sheffield Airport, 1994.

On 1 August 1992, the No. 56 (Fighter) Squadron nameplate was transferred to No. 65 Squadron at RAF Coningsby becoming No. 56 (Reserve) Squadron. It became the RAF's Operational Conversion Unit (No. 229 OCU) conducting training of Ab initio crew and aircrew converting from other aircraft types to the Tornado F.3. Following the announcement that the Eurofighter Typhoon would be stationed at Coningsby, it was decided that No. 56 (R) Squadron would relocate north to RAF Leuchars in Fife, home to No. 43 (F) Squadron and No. 111 (F) Squadron. The squadron moved north in March 2003, initially moving into the 'Ark Royal' hangar before moving into a new building on the northern side of the airfield. No. 56 (R) Squadron flew an aerobatic display from 1993 until December 2005 when it was announced, that as a cost-cutting measure, the RAF would no longer have a Tornado F.3 display. With the introduction of the Eurofighter Typhoon into RAF service it was decided that No. 56 (R) Squadron would be amalgamated with No. 43 (F) Squadron as part of the Tornado F.3 force draw down, with the Fighting Cocks taking over the OCU role. No. 56 (R) Squadron disbanded on 18 April 2008 at RAF Leuchars, with the occasion marked by a diamond nine formation flypast over Eastern Scotland.

The No. 56 (R) Squadron nameplate and standard was transferred to the Air Warfare Centre Air Command and Control Intelligence, Surveillance and Reconnaissance Operational Evaluation Unit (AIR C2ISR OEU) at RAF Waddington on 22 April 2008. Upon their move to Waddington, the Firebirds initially tested and evaluated the: Boeing E-3D Sentry AEW.1; Raytheon Sentinel R.1; Hawker Siddeley Nimrod R.1, MR.2 and BAE Systems Nimrod MRA.4. On 1 February 2018, all (Reserve) nameplates were rescinded by the RAF thus changing No. 56 (Reserve) Squadron to just No. 56 Squadron. On 10 June 2018, the Firebirds paraded through the village of North Weald, where the squadron was based between 1927 and 1941, after being awarded the 'Freedom of the District' by the local council.

As of 2020, the squadron provides operational test and evaluation, and specialist advice, for RAF airborne ground surveillance, airborne electronic sensors, airborne command and control, aerospace battle management and intelligence exploitation. In March 2021, the Sentinel R.1 was withdrawn from use, having made its last flight on 25 February 2021. The Sentry AEW.1 was retired from RAF service on 28 September 2021.

After the first General Atomics Protector RG1 was delivered to RAF Waddington in September 2023, No. 56 Test and Evaluation Squadron was tasked with introducing the type into service.

== Aircraft operated ==
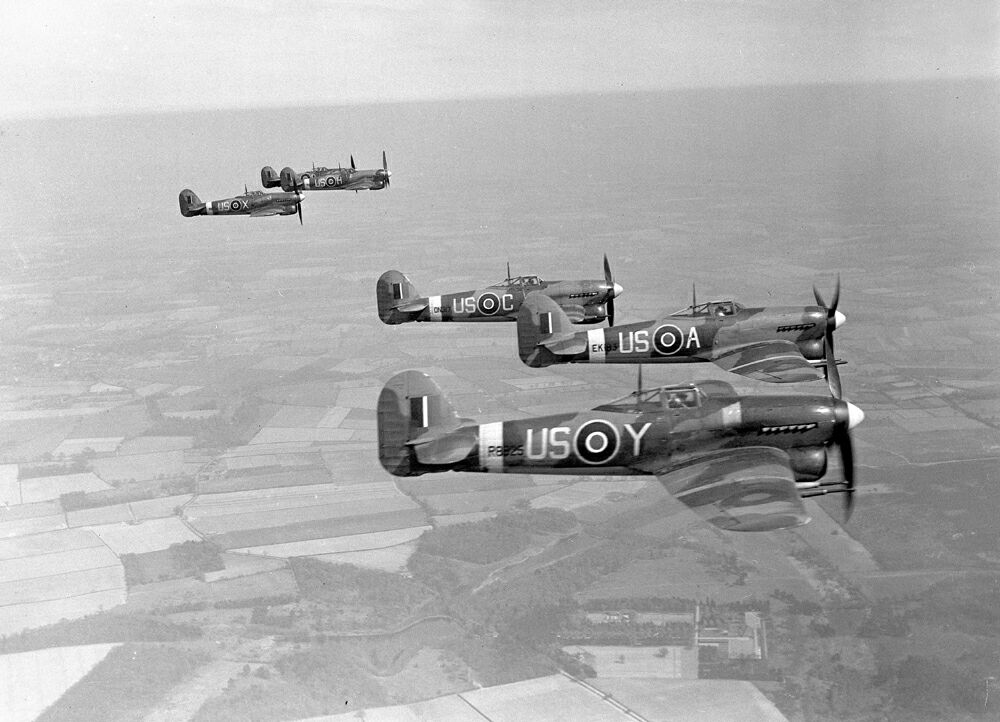
Two flights of No. 56 Squadron Hawker Typhoons in formation. Sqn. Ldr. T. H. V. Pheloung leads in US-A. By 1943 these "vics" of three were only used to impress photographers.

Aircraft operated include:

- Royal Aircraft Factory B.E.2c (Aug 1916–Apr 1917)
- Royal Aircraft Factory B.E.2e (1916–Apr 1917)
- Royal Aircraft Factory B.E.12 (1916–Apr 1917)
- Curtiss Scout (1916–Apr 1917)
- Bristol Scout (1916–Apr 1917)
- Sopwith 1½ Strutter (1916–Apr 1917)
- Royal Aircraft Factory S.E.5 (Mar 1917–Aug 1917)
- Royal Aircraft Factory S.E.5a (June 1917–Feb 1919)
- Sopwith Snipe (Feb 1920–Nov 1924)
- Gloster Grebe Mk.II (Sep 1924–Sep 1927)
- Armstrong Whitworth Siskin Mk.IIIa (Sep 1927–Oct 1932)
- Bristol Bulldog Mk.IIa (Oct 1932–May 1936)
- Gloster Gauntlet Mk.II (May 1936–July 1937)
- Gloster Gladiator Mk.I (July 1937–May 1938)
- Hawker Hurricane Mk.I (Apr 1938–Feb 1941)
- Hawker Hurricane Mk.IIa (Feb 1941–Mar 1942)
- Hawker Hurricane Mk.IIb (Feb 1941–Mar 1942)
- Hawker Typhoon Mk.Ia (Sep 1941–Dec 1942)
- Hawker Typhoon Mk.Ib (Mar 1942–May 1944)
- Hawker Hurricane Mk.I (May 1942–June 1944)
- de Havilland Tiger Moth Mk.II (Oct 1942–Sep 1944)
- Supermarine Spitfire Mk.IX (Apr 1944–July 1944)
- Hawker Tempest Mk.V (June 1944–Mar 1946)
- Gloster Meteor F.3 (Apr 1946–Aug 1948)
- North American Harvard (Apr 1947–Dec 1947)
- Airspeed Oxford (Dec 1947–June 1949)
- Gloster Meteor F.4 (July 1948–Dec 1950)
- Gloster Meteor T.7 (Aug 1949–July 1955)
- Gloster Meteor F.8 (Dec 1950–June 1960)
- de Havilland Vampire T.11 (Feb 1954–July 1959)
- Supermarine Swift F.1 (Feb 1954–Mar 1955)
- Supermarine Swift F.2 (Aug 1954–Mar 1955)
- Hawker Hunter F.5 (May 1955–Dec 1958)
- Gloster Meteor F.7 (July 1957–Apr 1960)
- Hawker Hunter F.6 (Nov 1958–Apr 1961)
- Hawker Hunter T.7/T.7A (Feb 1959–Jun 1966)
- English Electric Lightning F.1A (Dec 1960–Jun 1965)
- English Electric Lightning T.4 (Jan 1963–Apr 1966)
- English Electric Lightning F.3 (Mar 1965–Sep 1971)
- English Electric Lightning T.5 (Dec 1965–June 1976)
- English Electric Lightning F.1A (May 1966–Oct 1966)
- English Electric Canberra B.2 (Jul 1968–Jan 1975)
- English Electric Canberra T.4 (Jul 1968–Jan 1975)
- English Electric Lightning F.3 (Jan 1975–June 1976)
- English Electric Lightning F.6 (Sep 1971–June 1976)
- McDonnell Douglas Phantom FGR.2 (Mar 1976–July 1992)
- Panavia Tornado F.3 (July 1992–Apr 2008)
- Boeing E-3D Sentry AEW.1 (Apr 2008–Sep 2021)
- Raytheon Sentinel R.1 (Apr 2008–Feb 2021)
- Hawker Siddeley Nimrod R.1 (Apr 2008–June 2011)
- Hawker Siddeley Nimrod MR.2 (Apr 2008–June 2011)
- BAE Systems Nimrod MRA.4 (Apr 2008–Oct 2010)
- Hawker Beechcraft Shadow R.1 (2009–present)
- Boeing RC-135W Airseeker R.1 (Jan 2011–present)
- General Atomics Protector RG1 (Sep 2023–present)

== Heritage ==
The squadron's badge features a phoenix rising from fire, chosen to underline the squadron's ability to reappear intact regardless of the odds. The badge was approved by King Edward VIII in July 1936.

The squadron's motto is Quid si coelum ruat (Latin for 'What if heaven falls?').

== Battle honours ==
No. 56 Squadron has received the following battle honours. Those marked with an asterisk (*) may be emblazoned on the squadron standard.

- Western Front (1917–1918)*
- Arras (1917)
- Ypres (1917)*
- Cambrai (1917)
- Somme (1918)*
- Amiens (1918)
- Hindenburg Line (1918)
- France & Low Countries (1940)
- Dunkirk (1940)
- Battle of Britain (1940)*
- Fortress Europe (1942–1944)
- Dieppe (1942)
- France & Germany (1944–1945)*
- Normandy (1944)*
- Home Defence (1942–1945)
- Arnhem (1944)*

== See also ==
- List of Royal Air Force aircraft squadrons
