= John McCudden =

British World War I flying ace

Second Lieutenant John Anthony McCudden MC
- Born: 14 June 1897; Chatham, Kent, England
- Died: 18 March 1918 (aged 20); Vicinity of Saint-Souplet, France
- Burial place: Saint-Souplet British Cemetery, France (grave ref. III. D. 4)
- Relatives: James McCudden (brother)
- Military career
- Allegiance: United Kingdom
- Branch: British Army
- Service years: 1917–1918
- Rank: Second Lieutenant
- Nickname: Jack
- Units: No. 25 Squadron RFC; No. 84 Squadron RFC
- Conflicts: First World War
- Awards: Military Cross

John Anthony McCudden, MC (14 June 1897 – 18 March 1918) was a British flying ace of the First World War, credited with eight aerial victories. He survived a downing by German ace Ulrich Neckel on 28 February 1918, only to be killed in action, possibly by Hans Wolff. He was the younger brother of British ace James McCudden. McCudden's victor cannot be identified for certain since more than one German pilot made a claim in that combat. Wolff died in action only two months later, and his log book disappeared after the end of the war, and with it, details of the battle from his perspective.

== Military service ==
John entered the British Army in 1912 with the Royal Engineers. In 1916 he was a dispatch rider when he transferred to the Royal Flying Corps. Initially John served at the Engine Repair Shops before beginning his flight training in March 1917. His first posting was to 25 Squadron flying on DH4 bombers before moving to 84 Squadron, operating S.E.5a aeroplanes. He achieved two victories with 25 Squadron and a further six with 84 Squadron.

Fellow air ace Hugh Saunders recalled of McCudden -

"Jack" McCudden lived in the shadow of his elder brother, and was too anxious to emulate him. As an extremely gallant young pilot, in the short time that he was with the squadron he destroyed a number of enemy aircraft and was awarded the MC. He was, however, too impetuous and aggressive to last long, and was shot down and killed in March 1918. A great loss, but and inevitable end for a pilot who was always prepared to take on any odds.

— Hugh Saunders

== Military Cross ==
The award of the Military Cross to McCudden was reported in The Times of 23 April 1918 -

While on patrol he attacked single-handed two enemy triplanes, causing one to dive down steeply under control and the other to crash to the ground. On the day previous to this he destroyed a hostile two-seater, besides which he has driven down one other machine, which was observed to be destroyed, and four others completely out of control. He has always displayed great courage and determination.

The award was made posthumously to his mother at Kingston Barracks in September 1918.

== Burial ==
McCudden's body was initially recorded by the Graves Registration Unit as unknown. He was exhumed on 25 February 1921 and the Special Exhumation Report notes that he was 5 feet 8 inches and had brown hair. The report also notes that his uniform bore double wing badges with three blue chevrons and he wore a scarf of red, black and white stripes.

He is buried at St. Souplet British Cemetery (III. D. 4.) under the care of the Commonwealth War Graves Commission.

== Brothers ==
John was the brother of Flight-Sergeant Pilot Instructor William T.J. McCudden who was killed in England at Gosport, Major James McCudden VC who fell in France and Maurice Victor McCudden who also served in the air force. Maurice died in 1934 at Putney Hospital where he had been a patient for over a year with 'internal trouble'.
