= Monchy-au-Bois =

- Commune
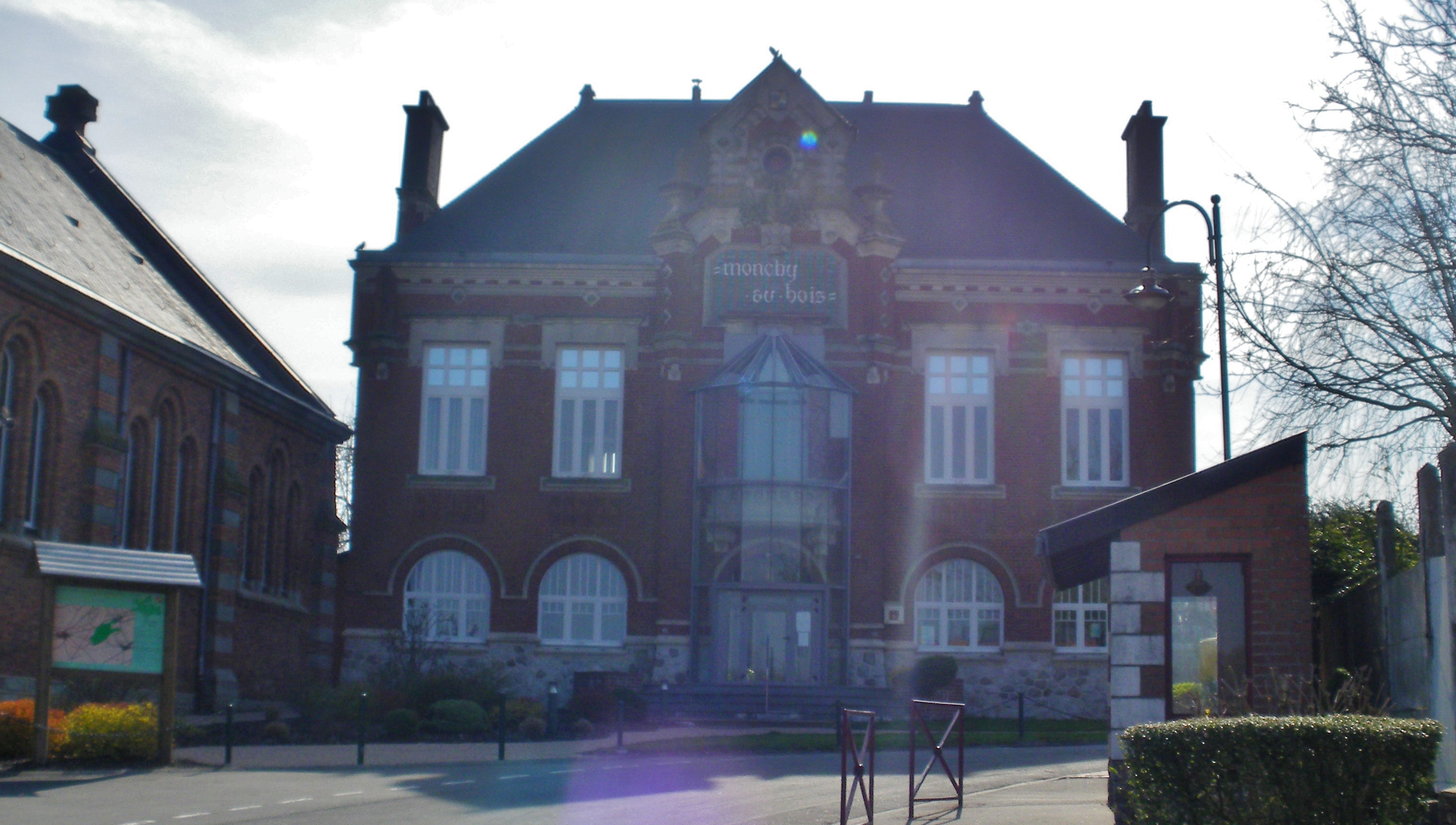
- The town hall of Monchy-au-Bois

- Coat of arms
- Location of Monchy-au-Bois
- Location within France Location within Hauts-de-France
- Coordinates: 50°10′53″N 2°39′27″E
- Country: France
- Region: Hauts-de-France
- Department: Pas-de-Calais
- Arrondissement: Arras
- Canton: Avesnes-le-Comte
- Intercommunality: CC Campagnes de l'Artois

Government
  - Mayor (2020–2026): Murielle Roussel
- Area^{1}: 10.98 km^{2} (4.24 sq mi)
- Elevation: 132 m (433 ft)
- Highest elevation: 161 m (528 ft)
- Lowest elevation: 118 m (387 ft)
- Population (2023): 545
  - Density: 49.6/km^{2} (129/sq mi)
- Time zone: UTC+01:00 (CET)
  - Summer (DST): UTC+02:00 (CEST)
- INSEE/Postal code: 62579 /62111
- ^{1} French Land Register data, which excludes lakes, ponds, glaciers > 1 km^{2} (0.386 sq mi or 247 acres) and river estuaries.

Monchy-au-Bois (French pronunciation: [mɔ̃ʃi o bwa]) is a commune in the Pas-de-Calais department in the Hauts-de-France region of France 10 miles (16 km) south-southwest of Arras.

It was on the front line in the First World War and was featured in Ernst Jünger's Storm of Steel.

== Population ==
Historical population
Year	Pop.	±% p.a.
1968	473	—
1975	449	−0.74%
1982	420	−0.95%
1990	455	+1.01%
1999	483	+0.67%
2007	506	+0.58%
2012	498	−0.32%
2017	561	+2.41%
2023	545	−0.48%
Source: INSEE

== See also ==
- Communes of the Pas-de-Calais department
