= List of last stands =

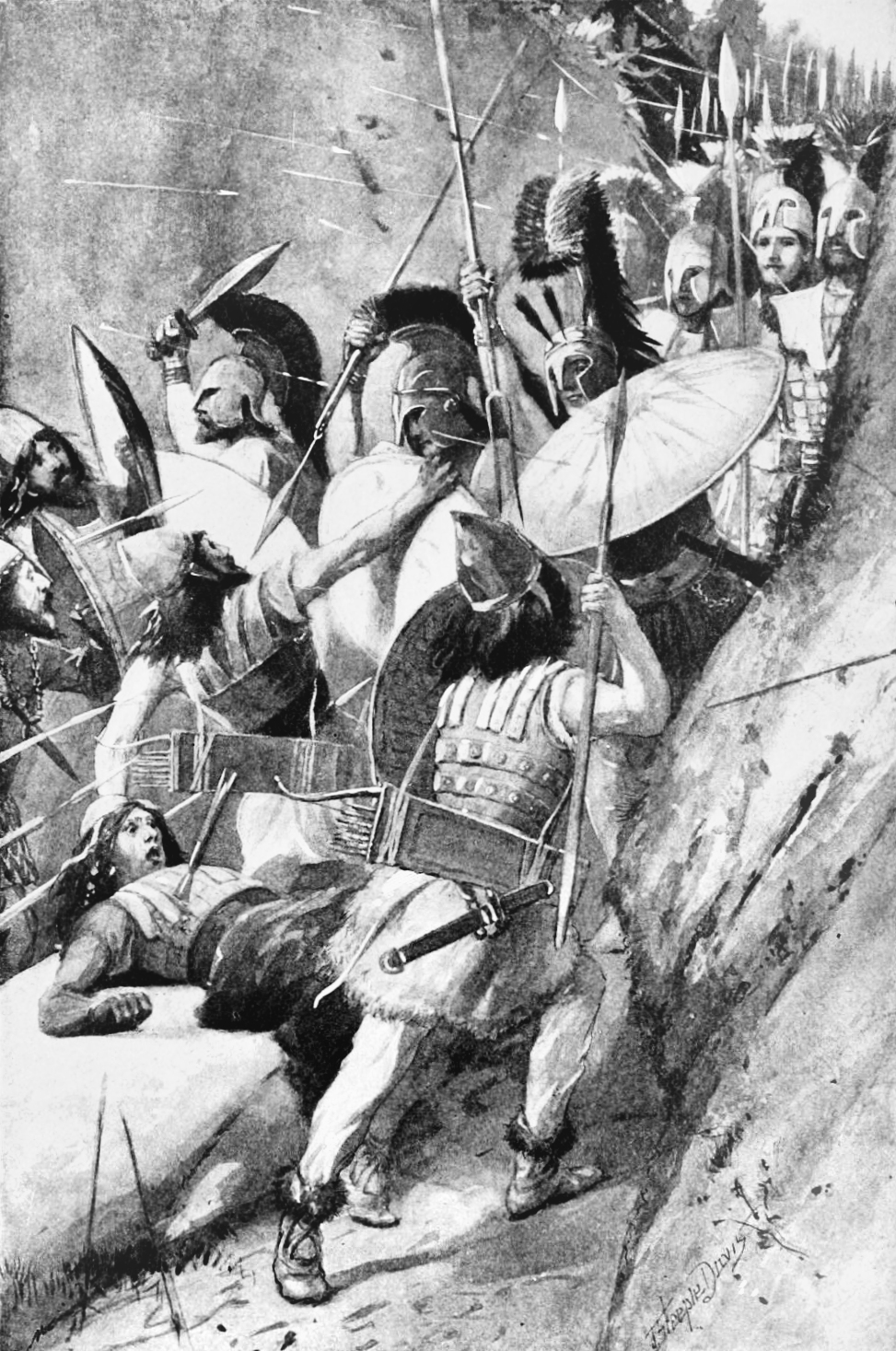
An illustration of the Battle of Thermopylae by John Steeple Davis.

A last stand is a military situation on which a normally-small defensive force holds a position against a more powerful opposing military force.

The defending force usually takes very heavy casualties. That can take the form of a rearguard action, holding a defensible location, or simply refusing to give up a position. A last stand is a last-resort tactic that is used if retreat or surrender is impossible or fighting is essential to the success of the cause. The defending force is most likely defeated, but it sometimes survives long enough for reinforcements to arrive that force the retreat of the attackers; it can even occasionally force the enemy away by itself.

At various times in history, last stands have ended with a defeat in the strict immediate military sense, but they have become moral victories by creating a heroic myth, which can be a great political asset to the cause for which the last stand had been fought.

== Land-based last stands ==
Name	Year	Defenders	Attackers	Description	Outcome
Battle of Thermopylae	480 BC	Greek city-states	Achaemenid Empire	A force of 7,000 allied Greek soldiers blocked the pass of Thermopylae from the invading Persian army numbering between 70,000 and 300,000 soldiers. The Greek defenders held their position for at least three days before being overrun. The battle has since become a symbol of courage against overwhelming odds.	Persian victory
Battle of the Persian Gate	330 BC	Persian Empire	Kingdom of Macedon (League of Corinth)	A Persian force under Ariobarzanes held Alexander the Great and his hand-picked, 17,000-strong force back for a month behind the narrow pass reaching Persepolis before being attacked in a pincer movement. The Persians, who were unarmed at this time, fought to death.	Macedonian victory
Battle of Gaixia (last stand at the Wu River)	202 BC	Xiang Yu's Forces (Western Chu)	Liu Bang's Forces (Han)	After his defeat at the Battle of Gaixia, Xiang Yu was chased by Liu Bang's elite cavalry to the Wu River, where he made his last stand with the last 28 of his loyal soldiers. They killed hundreds of Han soldiers, but after being seriously wounded, Xiang committed suicide by cutting his throat.	Han victory
Siege of Numantia	133 BC	Celtiberians	Roman Republic	The Roman consul Scipio Aemilianus with an army of 20,000 Roman legionaries plus 40,000 allies and mercenary troops, surrounded the city of Numantia during the Roman conquest of the Iberian Peninsula. Scipio's army constructed a wall around the city, created an artificial lake between that wall and the city walls, and erected several 10 feet towers from which archers could shoot into Numantia. The Romans asked for the full surrender of the Celtiberians. The inhabitants of Numantia refused to surrender and decided to die free rather than becoming slaves. Little by little the Numantians succumbed either from starvation, Roman arrows, or mass suicide. Overall the siege lasted between 8 and 16 months (depending on the sources) and ended with the burning and complete destruction of the city.	Roman victory and culmination of the Numantine War and the Celtiberian Wars.
Battle of Lauro	45 BC	Pompeians	Caesarians	After being defeated during the Battle of Munda, Gnaeus Pompeius the Younger unsuccessfully attempted to escape the Caesarian forces that pursued him and his remaining followers. Eventually, the Pompeians were cornered and surrounded near Lauro. After one last breakout attempt that allowed some of his forces to escape, Gnaeus Pompeius (who was heavily wounded) and the remaining Pompeian defenders mostly fought to the death against the Caesarians.	Caesarian victory, death of Gnaeus Pompeius the Younger
Siege of Masada	74 AD	Jewish Sicarii Rebels	Roman Empire	One of the final events in the First Jewish–Roman War, occurring at the hilltop fortress of Masada in current-day Israel, near the Dead Sea. The lengthy siege by Roman Empire troops culminated in the Roman legion surrounding Masada and constructing a siege ramp against the western face of the plateau, moving thousands of tons of stones and beaten earth over several months. Upon reaching the fortress, the Romans discovered that all 960 rebels had committed suicide. The siege of Masada is often revered in modern Israel as "a symbol of Jewish heroism".	Roman victory
Battle of Karbala	680 AD	Husayn of Banu Hashim and his Shia	Umayyad Caliphate	The Battle of Karbala took place on Muharram 10, in the year 61 AH of the Islamic calendar (October 10, 680 AD) in Karbala, in present-day Iraq. The battle took place between a small group of supporters and relatives of Muhammad's grandson, Husayn ibn Ali numbering 72 and a larger military detachment from the forces of Yazid I, the Umayyad caliph, numbering 30,000.	Umayyad victory
Siege of Mecca (692)	692 AD	Abd Allah ibn al-Zubayr's caliphate	Umayyad Caliphate	In 692 the armies of the Umayyad Caliphate besieged Mecca to put an end to the rival caliphate of Abd Allah ibn al-Zubayr. After six months of brutal fighting, with over 10,000 men including two of his sons having defected to the Umayyads, Abd Allah ibn al-Zubayr and his remaining loyal followers made a last stand at the Kaaba, where they fought to the death.	Umayyad victory
Battle of Roncevaux Pass	778 AD	Franks	Basques	A large force of Basques ambushed Charlemagne's army. To escape, Charlemagne assigned a rearguard to delay the Basques until the Franks could retreat. The rearguard action was successful, but all of the soldiers who took part in it were killed. The battle is the subject of the Song of Roland.	Basque victory
Siege of Pilėnai	1336	Grand Duchy of Lithuania	Teutonic Order	Attacked by a large Teutonic force, the fortress, commanded by Duke Margiris, tried in vain to organize a defense against the larger and stronger invader. Losing hope, the defenders decided to burn their property and commit mass suicide to deprive the Order from prisoners and loot by setting the wooden castle aflame.	Teutonic victory
Fall of Tenochtitlan	1521	Aztec Empire	New Spain	The Fall of Tenochtitlan, the capital of the Aztec Empire, was a decisive event in the Spanish conquest of the Aztec Empire. It occurred in 1521 following extensive manipulation of local factions and exploitation of pre-existing divisions by Spanish conquistador Hernán Cortés, who was aided by the support of his indigenous allies and his interpreter and companion La Malinche.	Decisive Spanish victory
Stand of the Swiss Guard	1527	Holy See; Papal States	Habsburg Monarchy; Holy Roman Empire; Habsburg Spain	A battle that took place during the War of the League of Cognac. 189 Swiss Guards under the command of Captain Kaspar Röist were ordered by Pope Clement VII to defend Rome from the Habsburg Imperial and Spanish troops threatening to loot the city. The Guard held long enough for Clement VII to escape across the Passetto di Borgo to Castel Sant'Angelo with some survivors and refugees.	Habsburg victory; escape of Pope Clement VII
Siege of Diu	1538	Portuguese Empire	Gujarat Sultanate; Ottoman Empire	Portuguese forces, under the command of António de Silveira, withstood a 2-month siege in Diu. Suffering heavy casualties (with only 40 survivors in the aftermath), the Portuguese repelled several Gujarati and Ottoman assaults on the fort. This enabled Diu to remain under Portuguese control until Operation Vijay during the annexation of Goa.	Portuguese victory
Siege of Katsurayama	1557	forces of Uesugi Kenshin	forces of Takeda Shingen	In March 1557, Katsurayama castle was attacked and besieged by the Takeda clan. The castle garrison, consisting of the Ochiai clan and elements of the Murakami clan, was loyal to Uesugi Kenshin and defended the fortress furiously, but was eventually overwhelmed by the Takeda army. All defending warriors fought to the death, while their families committed mass suicide and the castle was burned to the ground.	Takeda victory
Capture of Fort Saint Elmo	1565	(Sovereign Military Order of Malta) Hospitaller Malta Maltese Militias	Ottoman Empire	As part of the Great Siege of Malta, the Ottomans besieged and assaulted Fort Saint Elmo which was isolated from the other Hospitaller strongholds of Birgu and Senglea. The fort held out from 27 May until 23 June 1565, when its defenders made a last stand and most of them were killed. The Ottomans suffered many casualties in the various assaults on the fort, including the commander Dragut who was mortally wounded and died on the day the fort fell. The time it took for the fortress to fall was much longer than the Ottomans had anticipated and it bought crucial time for the Hospitallers who were eventually able to defeat the Ottomans after the arrival of a Spanish-led relief force in September.	Pyrrhic Ottoman victory Eventual Hospitaller Victory
Siege of Szigetvár	1566	Habsburg Monarchy	Ottoman Empire	The siege of Szigetvár was fought from 5 August to 8 September 1566 and, though it resulted in an Ottoman victory, there were heavy losses on both sides. Both commanders died during the battle — Zrinski in the final charge and Suleiman in his tent from natural causes. More than 20,000 Turks had fallen during the attacks and almost all of Zrinski's 2,300 man garrison was killed, with most of the final 600 men killed on the last day. Although the battle was an Ottoman victory, it stopped the Ottoman push to Vienna that year. Vienna was not threatened again until the Battle of Vienna in 1683.	Pyrrhic Ottoman victory
Siege of Gvozdansko	1577	Habsburg Monarchy	Ottoman Empire	The siege of Gvozdansko was an Ottoman siege of the fort of Gvozdansko in the Kingdom of Croatia in 1577–1578. The garrison lacked ammunition and suffered from hunger, thirst, and cold, while many died or were wounded in combat. All calls for surrender were rejected. Three major assaults on Gvozdansko were repelled leaving only 25–30 men still alive that held their positions on the last days of the siege. When Ottomans breached the gates of the fort, they found only corpses of soldiers that died of wounds, hunger, thirst, or were frozen to death	Ottoman victory
Battle of Tenmokuzan	1578	Takeda Clan	Forces of Oda Nobunaga and Tokugawa Ieyasu	After the capitulation of most of Shinano Province following the fall of Takato Castle on March 3, Takeda Katsuyori's forces dissolved after being denied entry to Kogakko Castle. Oda general Takika Saiwon discovered the remnants of the Takeda force at Tano, resulting in the remnants of the Takeda force executing their wives and children and fighting a last stand in order to be granted an honorable death. The Takeda force was wiped out after inflicting substantial casualties on the attacking force.	Oda-Tokugawa victory
Battle of Nieuwpoort	1600	United Provinces; England; Kingdom of Scotland	Spain	In the last stages of the Battle of Nieuwpoort, the Spanish regiment commanded by Alonso Maiolichino was refused surrender by the Dutch who held them accountable for previous massacres of prisoners of war. The unit consequently made its last stand and was wiped out.	United Provinces victory
Battle of Nishimonai	1601	Onodera clan	Mogami clan	Even though the Onodera clan that had ruled southern Akita, Japan, was completely defeated and exiled in 1600, one clan member, Onodera Shigemichi, continued to resist at his stronghold in Nishimonai and even refused to surrender when a large Mogami clan army arrived to eliminate this last remnant of Onodera resistance. Shigemichi and his loyal followers attempted to defend their castle against the Mogami, but were overwhelmed, whereupon he set fire to the fortress. According to some accounts, Shigemichi died in the flames, whereas others report that he managed to escape. Either way, Onodera Shigemichi is honored in Nishimonai until the present day.	Mogami clan victory
Rokugō rebellion	1603	Onodera clan loyalists	Satake clan	Around 1,000 rōnin, still loyal to their defeated and exiled former lord Onodera Yoshimichi, decided to rebel to protest against his poor treatment by the Tokugawa shogunate. Though their uprising had no chance of success, the rōnin attacked Rokugō, Akita, where they were quickly defeated by the Satake clan. The rebellion has since been considered an exceptional display of loyalty by samurai to their master.	Satake clan victory
Battle of Cecora	September 17, 1620	Polish-Lithuanian Commonwealth; Moldavia	Ottoman Empire; Allies: Crimean Khanate; Wallachia; Lipka Tatars; Principality of Transylvania	A battle between the Polish–Lithuanian Commonwealth 9,000 troops (aided by rebel Moldavian 600–1,000 troops) and Ottoman forces 20,000–60,000 (backed by Nogais), fought from 17 September to 7 October 1620 in Moldavia, near the Prut River. In the last stand during heavy assault on 6 October, most of the magnates and nobles broke and fled north, leaving infantry and camp, thus sealing the fate of the whole expedition: most of the Polish-Lithuanian troops were killed or captured. In the ensuing battle commander Stanisław Żółkiewski died and Koniecpolski and many others (Samuel Korecki, Mikolaj Struś, Mikołaj Potocki, Jan Żółkiewski, Łukasz Żołkiewski), Stanisław "Rewera" Potocki and Bohdan Khmelnytsky were taken captive. Before his death, Stanisław Żółkiewski received the blessing of his confessor, Father Szymon Wybierski (Wybierek, Wyberek) of the Society of Jesus, who stood by his side (7 October). Stanisław Żółkiewski's head was mounted on a pike and sent to the sultan; Duke Korecki, having often meddled in Moldavian territories, was executed in the Constantinople prison.	Decisive Ottoman victory
Battle of Prague (1648)	25 July – 1 November 1648	Bohemia	Swedish Empire	The Battle of Prague, which occurred between 25 July and 1 November 1648 was the last action of the Thirty Years' War. While the negotiations for the Peace of Westphalia were proceeding, the Swedes took the opportunity to mount one last campaign into Bohemia. The main result, and probably the main aim, was to loot the fabulous art collection assembled in Prague Castle by Rudolph II, Holy Roman Emperor (1552–1612), the pick of which was taken down the Elbe in barges and shipped to Sweden.	Czech victory
Sieges of Tranquebar (1655–1669)	1655–1669	Danish India	Thanjavur Nayak kingdom	The sieges of Tranquebar refer to the warfare between the Thanjavur Nayak kingdom and the Danish East India Company from 1655 to 1669. The Thanjavurian Nayak besieged the Danish colony of Tranquebar on multiple occasions; however, they were repelled due to the new fortifications being built around the city. A peace agreement was issued in 1669, ceding four Thanjavurian villages to the Danes.	Danish victory
Battle of Pavan Khind	July 13, 1660	Maratha Empire	Bijapur Sultanate	The Battle of Pavan Khind was a rear guard action by Marathas led by Baji Prabhu Deshpande to aid escape of Maratha King Shivaji Maharaj to Vishalgad. Baji Prabhu held an Adilshahi force of 10,000+ with a small Maratha army of 300 in a pass now known as Pavan Khind. The Maratha army perished in the Adilshahi assault, but only after achieving their objective of the safe arrival of Shivaji Maharaj to Vishalgad.	Strategic Maratha victory
Battle of Hodów	June 11, 1694	Polish-Lithuanian Commonwealth	Crimean Khanate	The 400-strong Polish cavalry charged the 700-strong Tatar vanguard and made them withdraw. Shortly afterwards Polish forces retreated to Hodów village due to overwhelming enemy numbers, and proceeded to fortify themselves using heavy wooden fences left there from earlier Tatar invasions. For the next 6 hours Polish troops resisted relentless Tatar attacks. Even after the Polish ran out of bullets, they continued to fire at the enemy, using Tatar arrowheads as improvised ammunition for their guns. Unable to defeat the Poles, the Tatars sent Polish-speaking Lipka Tatars to convince the Polish troops to surrender. When the Polish commander replied "Come and get us if you can", the Tatars withdrew to Kamieniec Podolski and gave up on the entire raid, having gained nearly nothing despite large troop losses and vast numerical advantage.	Decisive Polish victory
Battle of Chamkaur	December 22, 1704	Khalsa (Sikhs)	Mughal Empire; Alliance of Hindu Hill Chiefs	On the 22nd of December 1704, a Sikh force of 40 people were attacked with a much larger army. The Mughals assisted by 22 different hill kingdoms attacked the Sikhs in a haveli situated in Chamkaur with the mission to capture Guru Gobind Singh. Despite being outnumbered, the Sikhs fought against the Mughals for an entire day and allowed the guru to escape in the night alongside 2 other Sikhs. 37 Sikhs were martyred while an innumerable amount of the enemy force was slain.	Tactical Mughal Victory, Strategic Sikh Victory
Three Hundred Aragvians	1795	Kingdom of Kartli-Kakheti; Kingdom of Imereti	Qajar Iran	The 300 Aragvians were part of the contingent raised from the highland districts on the Aragvi river which saw action under Prince Royal Vakhtang of Georgia, on the approaches of the Georgian capital of Tbilisi, on 11 September 1795. The heavy fighting, unfolding in the fields of Krtsanisi and continuing in the streets of Tbilisi, saw the defeat of the aging and hopelessly outnumbered Georgian king Heraclius II at the hands of the Persian army led by Agha Muhammad Khan, and the sack of the capital. According to the Georgian accounts, the Aragvians had pledged themselves to fight to the death and stayed true to their oath. Most of them were killed, fighting the last stand at Tbilisi and giving Heraclius a means of retreat.	Qajar victory
Battle of Clonard	1798	Great Britain; Ireland	United Irishmen	The Battle of Clonard occurred on the 11th of July 1798 near Leinster Bridge in the town of Clonard, during the Irish Rising of that year. A combined force of between 2,000-4,000 United Irishmen engaged a force of 27 government militiamen led by Lieutenant Thomas Tyrrell over 6 hours in an attempt to cross the River Boyne. The defenders held the fortified house until they were reinforced by a Sergeant and 11 men of the Northumberland Fencibles and 15 men of the Kinnegad Cavalry under the command and including Lt Edward Haughton when the rebels were routed and retreated to Carbury. The attack on Clonard was a disastrous failure and a severe blow to the surviving rebels. It was a decisive British victory.	British Victory
Battle of Mount Tabor	1799	France	Ottoman Empire	On 16 April 1799, a French force of 1,500 men under General Kleber found itself attacked by 30,000 Ottoman horsemen near Mount Tabor in Palestine. After forming infantry squares, the French held for hours against the massive Ottoman force. Eventually, a relief force of 2,500 men under Napoleon Bonaparte came to their aid. Upon arrival, Napoleon sent 300 men to burn the Ottoman camp, which misled them into thinking they were encircled and caused them to retreat in panic.	French victory
Battle of Mobekk	May 18, 1808	Sweden	Denmark–Norway	The Battle of Mobekk was fought between Swedish and Norwegian troops on May 18, 1808, in the Dano-Swedish War of 1808–09. The Swedish vanguard outpost at Mobekk near Kongsvinger of about 300 men protecting the main army under Gustaf Mauritz Armfelt was attacked by 800 Norwegian troops under Bernhard Ditlef von Staffeldt. The Swedes won after several hours of fighting and 34 men dead and wounded, the Norwegians lost 269 men.	Swedish victory
Battle of Tarvis (1809)	May 18, 1809	Austrian Empire	First French Empire	The Storming of the Predil Blockhouse from 15 to 18 May saw the Franco-Italian army of Eugène de Beauharnais attacking Austrian Empire forces under Albert Gyulai. Eugène crushed Gyulai's division in a pitched battle near Tarvisio, then an Austrian town known as Tarvis. At nearby Malborghetto Valbruna (Malbotghet Wolfstal) and Predil Pass, small garrisons of Croatian Grenz infantry led by Captain Johann Hermann heroically defended two forts before being overwhelmed by sheer numbers. On 18 May, Predil fell to assault and the defenders were killed to the last man.	Strategic French victory
Battle of Čegar	May 31, 1809	Revolutionary Serbia	Ottoman Empire	During the Battle of Čegar, Serbian Revolutionary Commander Stevan Sinđelić along with 3,000 of his troops became separated from the bulk of the Serbian forces. After becoming surrounded by Ottoman forces, hand-to-hand combat ensured. After defences were breached, Sinđelić fired his flintlock pistol into a pile of gunpowder kegs. The ensuing explosion killed both the defenders and attackers.	Ottoman victory
Battle of Saidu	March 1827	Sikh Empire	Yusufzai tribesmen and Peshawar Sardars	The battle was a part of Afghan-Sikh Wars in which 8,000 Sikhs were attacked by a gigantic Afghan force of 150,000. Despite this, over 6,000 Afghans were killed and the Sikhs won the battle.	Sikh Victory
Dade Battle	1835	Seminole, Florida	United States	The battle was the opening conflict of the Second Seminole War, which lasted from 1835 to 1842. Major Francis Dade, with 110 US troops was ambushed by 180 Seminole warriors in Central Florida, with only 3-5 US troops surviving the attack. The battle was fought on Dec. 28,1835.	Seminole victory
Battle of the Alamo	1836	Republic of Texas	Mexico	The battle was part of the Texas Revolution. Following a 13-day siege of the Alamo, Mexican soldiers stormed the building, killing all of the defenders.	Mexican victory
Battle of Gandamak	1842	British Empire	Emirate of Afghanistan	The 1842 Kabul Retreat took place during the First Anglo-Afghan War. Following an uprising in Kabul, Major General Sir William Elphinstone negotiated an agreement with Wazir Akbar Khan, one of the sons of the Afghan Emir Dost Mohammad Barakzai, by which his army was to withdraw to the British garrison at Jalalabad, more than 90 miles (140 km) away. As the army and its numerous dependents and camp-followers began its march, it came under attack from Afghan tribesmen. Many of the column died of exposure, frostbite or starvation or were killed during the fighting. The final stand was made just outside a village called Gandamak on 13 January.	Afghan victory
Battle of Chapultepec/Niños Héroes	1847	Mexico	United States	Mexico City's Chapultepec Castle served as the Mexican Army's military academy. In the 13 September 1847 Battle of Chapultepec, during the Mexican–American War, it was defended by Mexican troops under the command of Nicolás Bravo, including cadets from the academy. The greatly outnumbered defenders battled General Winfield Scott's troops for about two hours before General Bravo ordered retreat, but six cadets refused to fall back and fought to the death. Legend has it that the last of the six, Juan Escutia, leapt from Chapultepec Castle wrapped in the Mexican flag to prevent the flag from being taken by the enemy. These Niños Héroes (Spanish: [ˈniɲos ˈeɾoes], Boy Heroes), also known as the Heroic Cadets or Boy Soldiers, are a key part of Mexico's patriotic folklore, commemorated by a national holiday on September 13. However, several modern Mexican historians claim that parts of the story are not factual.	American victory
Battle of Leybar Bridge	1855	France	Emirate of Trarza	On 21 April 1855, the 14-man strong garrison of a small fortified tower guarding the bridge that served as the only access to the French colonial capital Saint-Louis was attacked by the entire Trarza army while French governor Louis Faidherbe was away on an expedition in Trarza lands with the entirety of French forces in the colony. The resistance of the garrison, under sergeant Henri Brunier, effectively saved the city. French casualties were of three wounded, while the Trarzas retreated with heavy losses. Brunier was awarded the Legion of Honour while his men were awarded the Médaille Militaire.	French victory
Battle of Camarón	1863	France	Mexico	In the Battle of Camarón, 65 Foreign Legionnaires stood against 3,000 Mexican soldiers for over 10 hours. The Legionnaires only surrendered after an attempted bayonet charge, and a promise that they would receive medical attention and be allowed to keep their weapons and equipment.	Tactical Mexican victory Strategic French victory
Battle of Qbaada	1864	Circassia	Russian Empire	In 1864, the final battle of the century-long Russo-Circassian War took place in Qbaada between 20,000 men and women, including local villagers and militia as well as tribal cavalry, and a superior Russian force of 250,000 well-equipped soldiers. Refusing to surrender, the Circassians attempted to break the encirclement. The Russians, advancing from four sides, decimated the Circassians with their superior artillery and infantry. After the remaining fighters were killed, the Russians celebrated their victory with a parade and publicly executed 100 Circassian warriors.	Russian victory
Fetterman Fight	1866	United States	Lakota people Dakota; Northern Cheyenne; Arapaho	Fetterman Fight was a part of the Bozeman Trail War of 1866–1868. Captain William Fetterman and his command were surrounded by a much larger force of Native Americans and were wiped out within half an hour.	Native American victory
Battle of Cerro Corá	1870	Paraguay	Empire of Brazil	The last engagement of the Paraguayan War, the Battle of Cerro Corá saw the complete destruction of all remaining forces of Paraguayan President Francisco Solano López. Although completely outnumbered, many of the Paraguayans refused to surrender and instead were killed in attempts to escape, made stubborn last stands or simply allowed themselves to be shot. Among those killed were President Lopez, Vice President Domingo Francisco Sánchez, Secretary of State Luis Caminos, and the son of the President, Juan Francisco López. According to one account, the President's last words were that he was "dying with [his] homeland". In this regard, historian Gabriele Esposito has commented that considering the enormous Paraguayan casualties during the war, López had "certainly ensured that most of [Paraguay's] people had died before him".	Brazilian victory, end of the Paraguayan War
Battle of the Little Bighorn (Custer's Last Stand)	1876	United States	Lakota; Dakota; Northern Cheyenne; Arapaho	Custer's Last Stand was part of the Battle of the Little Bighorn. George Custer † found himself on an open hilltop with a significantly larger force of Native Americans attacking. Even though, according to Lakota accounts, the attack on Last Stand Hill produced the most casualties, the Lakota destroyed Custer's force within an hour.	Native American victory
Battle of Shipka Pass	1877	Opalchentsi; Russian Empire	Ottoman Empire	During the second battle, 38,000 Ottomans decided to capture three positions guarded by 7,500 mainly Bulgarian defenders. The Ottomans spent six days trying to capture the positions, but eventually retreated after Russian reinforcements arrived.	Bulgarian/Russian victory
Battle of Shiroyama	1877	Samurai of Satsuma	Imperial Japanese Army	500 samurai were surrounded by 30,000 Japanese soldiers. The samurai held their position, engaging in close-quarter fighting, as the Japanese soldiers were not trained for it. They continued to hold until their leader, Saigō Takamori †, was killed. They then decided to charge downhill and were subsequently killed.	Imperial Japanese victory
Battle of Rorke's Drift	1879	British Empire	Zulu Kingdom	One hundred forty-one members of the British Army defended a mission station against a force of 3,000 to 4,000 Zulus. The battle happened soon after the British defeat at the Battle of Isandlwana. The British at Rorke's Drift had time to prepare defensive positions in anticipation of a Zulu attack. After several fierce assaults over 12 hours, the Zulu's attack was repulsed. Eleven Victoria Crosses were awarded to the defenders, among other decorations.	British victory
Battle of Arica	1880	Peru	Chile	A force of 6000 Chilean soldiers accompanied by five warships assaulted a garrison of 1600 Peruvian soldiers at Arica. The Chilean army launched a giant assault to Arica where the 1600 men of the defense fought more than 8000 Chileans, from sea and land, who finally captured the Morro de Arica killing most of the defenders.	Chilean victory
The Last Eleven at the Battle of Maiwand	27 July 1880	British Empire	Emirate of Afghanistan	The Last Eleven were the remnants of a 2,000-strong British force, the rest having retreated or been overrun by Afghan forces commanded by Ayub Khan. Taking refuge in a small enclosure at a garden, they made a determined last stand, firing until only eleven of their number (two officers and nine other ranks) were left. They then charged out into the masses of the enemy, led by Lieutenant Thomas Henn, and were killed. No British lived to tell the story, but it was reported to them later that year by a former officer of Ayub Khan's army, who said that the Afghans had been truly impressed by the bravery of those men.	Afghan victory
Battle of La Concepción	1882	Chile	Peru	A force of 77 Chilean soldiers were besieged in Concepción, Peru.	Peruvian victory
The Shangani Patrol	1893	British South Africa Company	Matabele Kingdom	During the First Matabele War, 34 men of the Shangani Patrol were ambushed by ~3,000 Matabele warriors. The Matabele leader offered to spare the Shangani Patrol if they surrendered, but they refused and kept fighting. Under the orders of Major Allan Wilson †, the remaining British took cover behind their dead horses and inflicted heavy casualties on the attackers. After they ran out of ammunition, the remaining survivors were finished off by an assagei spear charge. The British took total casualties, but killed ~500 of their attackers. Usually, the Matabele mutilate the bodies of the enemy, but made an exception for Wilson's men. One of the Matabele leaders explained after the battle, "The white men died so bravely we would not treat them as we do the cowardly Mashonas and others."	Matabele victory
Siege of Lapa	1894	Brazil	Maragatos	During the Federalist Revolution, around 800 defenders composed mostly of civilian volunteers held a rebel force 3 or 4 times larger, for 26 days. The city surrendered after the death of their commander, Gomes Carneiro, however, the rebel force had been delayed for enough time that the government managed to muster a counter-attack, which led to the defeat of the rebel forces.	Pyrrhic Maragato victory
Battle of Saragarhi	1897	British Empire 36th Sikh Regiment	Pashtuns	On 12 September 1897, 21 Sikhs of the 36th Sikhs defended an army post from the 10,000 Pashtuns trying to capture it. The defenders all chose to fight, buying enough time for a British Indian relief party to recapture the fort. September 12 is remembered as Saragarhi Day among Sikh military personnel.	Tactical Pashtun victory; Strategic British Indian victory
Siege of Kabkabiya	1909	Mahdist State	Sultanate of Darfur	After a siege of 17 to 18 months, forces of the Sultanate of Darfur finally stormed the fortified camp of Mahdist leader Sanin Husain at Kabkabiya. The latter's thousands-strong army had been reduced to about 400 loyalists through starvation, desertions, and fighting. These loyalists made a last stand, and were killed fighting alongside their commander.	Victory of the Sultanate of Darfur
Gavrilović's defense of Belgrade	1914	Serbia	Austria-Hungary	Gavrilović lead the Serbian defensive action that delayed the Austro-Hungarians in fully taking Belgrade during the first World War. The attacking force vastly outnumbered the Serbians, and were only gaining reinforcements. They also had a vast superiority in artillery. Gavrilović was forced to engage the Austro-Hungarians in close-quarter combat. Eventually, the defenders mounted a final charge in an attempt to destroy the enemy's bridgehead. A memorial planted by the enemy commander still stands today, reading "Here Lies Serbian Heroes."	Failure to destroy Austro-Hungarian bridgehead
Battle of Gravenstafel Ridge	1915	Canada	German Empire	The Battle of Gravenstafel was one of the six engagements that made up the Second Battle of Ypres. The battle had members of the Canadian Expeditionary Force hold their position, as well as the position of the French Moroccan and Algerian divisions, who had retreated after the gas attack. The Canadians fought for three days, despite being surrounded on three sides, gassed again, outnumbered, and outgunned.	German attack repulsed
Attack of the Dead Men	1915	Russian Empire	German Empire	The Defense of Osowiec, popularly named "The Attack of the Dead Men" was a battle of World War I that took place at Osowiec Fortress, in northeast Poland, on August 6, 1915. The incident got its name from the bloodied, zombie-like appearance of the Russian combatants after they were bombarded with a mixture of poison gases, chlorine and bromine, by the Germans. The Germans launched a full frontal offensive on Osowiec Fortress at the beginning of July; the attack included 14 battalions of infantry, one battalion of sappers, 24–30 heavy siege guns, and 30 batteries of artillery equipped with poison gases led by Field Marshal Paul von Hindenburg. Russian defenses were manned by 500 soldiers of the 226th Infantry Regiment Zemlyansky, and 400 militia. The Germans waited until 4 a.m. on 6 August for favorable wind conditions, when the attack opened with regular artillery bombardment combined with chlorine gas. "The gas caused the grass to turn black and leaves to turn yellow, and the dead birds, frogs and other animals and insects were lying everywhere. Terrain looked like Hell." The Russians either had no gas masks, or had poorly made ones, and most soldiers used their undershirts as masks, with many soaking them in water or urine. Sub-Lieutenant Vladimir Kotlinsky, the highest ranking Russian soldier to survive the initial attack, rallied the other surviving soldiers, and they elected to charge the advancing German lines. Over twelve battalions of the 11th Landwehr Division, making up more than 7000 men, advanced after the bombardment expecting little resistance. They were met at the first defense line by a counter-charge made up of the surviving soldiers of the 13th Company of the 226th Infantry Regiment. The Germans became panicked by the appearance of the Russians, who were coughing up blood and bits of their own lungs, as the hydrochloric acid formed by the mix of the chlorine gas and the moisture in their lungs had begun to dissolve their flesh. The Germans retreated, running so fast they got caught up in their own c-wire traps. The five remaining Russian guns subsequently opened fire on the fleeing Germans. Kotlinsky died later that evening. The Russians did not hold the area for much longer. The Germans threatened to encircle the fortress with the capture of Kovno and Novogeorgiesk. The Russians demolished much of the fortress and withdrew on August 18.	Pyrrhic Russian victory
Battle of Maysalun	1920	Syria	France	The ragtag forces of Yusuf al-Azma attempted to hold off the advance of the superior French Army at Maysalun Pass. al-Azma was killed during the battle. The battle gained a legacy in the Arab imagination as a desperate struggle against colonial incursion.	Decisive French victory, Damascus is captured later that day
Battle of Zadwórze	1920	Poland	Russian SFSR	The Battle of Zadwórze was a battle of the Polish-Soviet War. It was fought on August 17, 1920, near the train station of Zadwórze, a small village located 33 kilometres from the city centre of Lwów (now Lviv). The battle, lasting roughly 24 hours, resulted in the complete destruction of the Polish forces but at the same time halted the Soviet advance, preventing the forces of Semyon Budyonny from seizing Lwów and so contributing to the successful defence of Warsaw. The battle has been called the Polish Thermopylae.	Soviet victory
Defence of the Polish Post Office in Danzig	1939	Poland	Nazi Germany	The Defence of the Polish Post Office in Danzig (Gdańsk) was one of the first acts of World War II in Europe, as part of the Invasion of Poland. On September 1, 1939, Polish personnel defended the building for some 15 hours against assaults by the SS Heimwehr Danzig (SS Danzig Home Defense), local SA formations and special units of Danzig police. All but four of the defenders, who were able to escape from the building during the surrender, were sentenced to death by a German court martial as illegal combatants on October 5, 1939, and executed.	German victory
Battle of Wizna	1939	Poland	Nazi Germany	The Battle of Wizna was fought during the early stages of the Invasion of Poland. The 700 Polish defenders held a fortified position for three days against a Nazi force that outnumbered them ~ 60–1. Captain Władysław Raginis † eventually ordered the last two bunkers to surrender after they ran out of ammunition, then committed suicide.	German victory
Battle of Raseiniai	1941	Soviet Union	Nazi Germany	During Operation Barbarossa, the German 4th Panzer Group engaged the Soviet 3rd and 12th Mechanized Corps in the town of Raseiniai, Lithuania from June 23 to 27, 1941. Over the course of a full day, a single KV-2 tank stationed at a crossroads in the town held back an entire division of German vehicles and troops before a Flak 88 anti-tank gun blew a hole in the tank at point blank range and the Nazi soldiers threw in grenades to kill the crew. The German troops, despite their genocidal beliefs regarding Slavic peoples, later buried the tank's crew with full military honours.	German victory
Last stand of the Italian-Croatian Legion	1942	(Italy) (Independent State of Croatia) Italian-Croatian Legion	Soviet Union	In course of the Operation Little Saturn, the Italian-Croatian Legion (a unit of about 1,000 Croatian volunteers fighting for the Royal Italian Army) was surrounded by the Red Army at the Hills 168 and 210 near Meshkov. For two days, the Croatians fought fiercely against the Russians, but on 21 December their ammunition ran out – nevertheless, the legionaries did not surrender and when the final Soviet assault overran their position, all were killed in battle.	Soviet victory, Italian-Croatian Legion completely destroyed
Defense of the Adzhimushkay quarry, Crimea	1942	Soviet Union	Nazi Germany	When Kerch was occupied by the Wehrmacht in November 1941, a squad of Soviet partisans already operated in the catacombs. By May 1942, a counteroffensive was staged by the Wehrmacht to expel the Red Army from the Kerch Peninsula and the city of Sevastopol. The Red Army was overrun, had to evacuate the bridgehead and sustained heavy casualties. By May 19, 1942, regular fighting in the area had ended, and to ensure the evacuation of the Soviet troops across the Strait of Kerch, a defense group was left in Adzhimushkay and led by Colonel Pavel Yagunov. The group absorbed retreating soldiers, along with numerous civilians fleeing the city, and eventually grew to several thousand. When it became obvious that the bridgehead over the strait could not be held, the Adzhimushkay group found refuge in the catacombs. It is estimated that more than 10,000 fled to the Great Adzhimushkay catacombs system, and 3,000 to the Small Adzhimushkay catacombs system. The catacombs were ill-suited for defense, as no supplies had been prepared there, and all wells were located outside. Any supply of water had to be taken by force since a sortie was needed to reach a well. The Soviet group attempted several counterattacks, including one resulting in the defeat of the Wehrmacht garrison in Adzhimushkay on the night of 8 and 9 July 1942. Colonel Yagunov was killed in that assault. Most Soviet guerrillas died, as the group ran out of ammunition, food and water and resorted to extreme techniques of survival such as preparing meat of the dead livestock earlier killed in the mine entrances and gathering water condensed on the mine ceilings. The defenders also attempted to dig their own wells in the catacombs as deep as 14 m to reach the phreatic water layer. The German forces surrounded the quarries with barbed wire fencing, blocked the entrances and exits and bombed and shelled them. General Hermann Ochsner, the chief of the chemical forces, proposed the use of a non-lethal irritant gas to smoke the partisans out of such hiding places, but he was denied permission to carry out the attack although survivors' testimonies claimed otherwise.	Nazi victory. The estimates of the number of guerrilla fighters and civilians surviving the 170-day siege and final clash and their subsequent treatment by Germans varies from 48 to 300 of the initial 13,000.
Last stand of the 44th Infantry Division's Panzerjäger-Abteilung 46	1942	Nazi Germany	Soviet Union	As part of Operation Koltso, the Soviet 21st and 65th Armies attacked the Marinovka salient of the German Stalingrad pocket with hundreds of tanks, hoping to easily overrun the three weakened German divisions in their way. Despite this, the Germans fiercely and desperately resisted. In one of the most notable cases, the German 44th Infantry Division's Panzerjäger-Abteilung 46 ("tank-hunter unit 46"), counting 128 soldiers, repulsed four waves of attacking heavy and medium tanks (including KV-1s and T-34s) with just three 7.62 cm Pak 36(r) anti-tank guns. The unit inflicted heavy losses on the Soviets, destroying dozens of tanks, while suffering 64 killed and 58 wounded. By the end, just six men and one anti-tank gun were still combat-ready, but eventually their ammunition ran out and their position was overrun by the Soviet Army. Panzerjäger-Abteilung 46 was completely destroyed.	Soviet victory, Panzerjäger-Abteilung 46 completely destroyed
Second Battle of Mount Austen	1943	Japan	United States	After the capture of the Sea Horse by the Americans, the Japanese in the area of Guadalcanal nicknamed the "Gifu" were now isolated from the rest of the 17th Army. In a last message over his field phone before the line was cut, Takeyoshi Inagaki refused an order from Akinosuke Oka to abandon his position, instead vowing that his command would "fight to the last". Following this declaration, twelve 155 mm and thirty-seven 105 mm guns opened fire on the Gifu. In next one and a half hours, the American artillery fired 1,700 shells into an area about 1,000 yd square. On 18 January, the Americans attacked into the west side of the Gifu, making some headway and destroying several Japanese pillboxes over the next two days until heavy rains stopped the attack on 20 January. On 22 January, American forces transferred a Stuart light tank into the area, allowing them to decisively break the Japanese positions on Mount Austen and take up positions in the center of the Gifu. On that night, around 02:30, realizing the battle was lost, Inagaki led his staff and most of the remaining survivors of his command, around 100 men, in a final charge on the Americans. In the charge, Inagaki and the rest of his troops were nearly killed to the last man. At sunrise on 23 January, the Americans secured the rest of the Gifu.	American victory, end of fighting in the Gifu
Last Battle of the Pohorje Battalion	1943	Slovene Partisans	Nazi Germany	The Pohorje Battalion was an armed unit of the Slovene Partisans, a resistance army of the Slovenian people, organized on the territory occupied by the Third Reich during the Second World War. As other units of Slovene Partisans, it performed its actions in a guerrilla-like way, avoiding larger conflicts against a much stronger opponent. Their last battle was fought in a winter camp, where they were planning to spend the winter. On 8 January, 69 fighters (among them women and children) were surrounded by some 2000 men of the German armed forces. In a two and half hour long fight, all but one of the defenders, who was too severely wounded to kill himself, were killed (their commandant gave the order that none should be captured alive). The captured partisan was shot subsequently, yet the last stand of the battalion became a symbol of a heroic stance against occupation and a legendary action of the Slovenian people in a fight for their freedom.	German victory
Warsaw Ghetto Uprising	1943	Jewish Resistance: ŻOB; ŻZW; Polish Resistance: Home Army; People's Guard	Nazi Germany	The Warsaw Ghetto Uprising was an act of Jewish resistance in the Warsaw Ghetto, opposing Nazi Germany's final effort to transport the remaining Ghetto population to Treblinka extermination camp. They fought for 27 days until the Ghetto was burnt down by the Waffen-SS.	German victory
Siege of Bastogne	1944	United States	Nazi Germany	Members of the 101st Airborne were ordered to defend the vital crossroad at the Belgian town of Bastogne from capture by the XLVII Panzer Corps. Outnumbered, under-equipped, and surrounded, the Americans held out for seven days, before being relieved by elements of General Patton's Third Army.	American victory
Battle of Iwo Jima	February 19 – March 26, 1945	Empire of Japan	United States	The Battle of Iwo Jima (19 February – 26 March 1945) was a major battle in which the United States Marine Corps and Navy landed on and eventually captured the island of Iwo Jima from the Imperial Japanese Army (IJA) during World War II.	American victory
Battle of Kapyong	1951	United Nations: Canada	China	The Chinese attacked through the Kapyong Valley, the traditional invasion route to Seoul, and a potential route to surround US forces in Korea. Two Chinese divisions, a total of 20,000 soldiers, assaulted the UN defense, consisting of two battalions of 700 soldiers each, the Australian 3 RAR on Hill 504 supported by 15 U.S. Sherman tanks, the Canadian 2 PPCLI on Hill 677. After a fierce fire-fight, the Australians and U.S. tanks retreated from the battlefield and were no longer engaged in the battle. The Chinese encircled the Canadians, preventing any support or ammunition from entering. Brigadier Burke flew above the Canadians in a converted Dakota aircraft and through a loudspeaker ordered them to make a last stand without any support. Lt. Col. Stone ordered his battalion, "No retreat, no surrender." In an overnight battle, the Chinese launched mass assaults on Hill 677, the Canadians eventually exhausted their ammunition, and on three occasions called in long distance artillery barrages directly onto their own positions, now overrun by Chinese soldiers, to break up the attacks. The Chinese withdrew with enormous casualties of about 5,000 killed and many more wounded, declining further assaults against the Canadians, who were now depleted of ammunition. The Canadians sustained 18 killed and 38 wounded. There were no Canadian or Chinese soldiers reported as surrendering or being taken captive, only fighting to the end.	Canadian UN victory
Battle of Imjin River	1951	United Nations: United Kingdom	China	Surrounded by a Division of Chinese troops, about 450 British soldiers of the Gloucestershire Regiment held hill 235 for three days without supplies. Though eventually overrun with many captured, their defense delayed Chinese forces and is credited with saving the capital city of Seoul from falling. The site was later renamed Gloster Hill in their honour.	Chinese victory but thwarted their advance on Seoul.
Battle of Rezang La	1962	India	China	120 soldiers of Charlie Company, 13th Kumaon Regiment, Indian Army, led by Maj. Shaitan Singh, PVC made a last stand at the Rezang La pass near Chushul, Ladakh against the invading Chinese Peoples Liberation Army forces in the 1962 Indo-Sino Conflict. 114 of the 120 soldiers were killed. Maj Shaitan Singh was awarded India's highest gallantry award, the Param Vir Chakra.	Chinese victory
Battle of Longewala	1971	India	Pakistan	The Battle of Longewala (4–7 December 1971) was one of the first major engagements in the western sector during the Indo-Pakistani War of 1971, fought between assaulting Pakistani forces and Indian defenders at the Indian border post of Longewala, in the Thar Desert of Rajasthan state in India. About 120 Indian soldiers from the 23rd battalion of the Punjab Regiment held on and fought against the invading force of 2000 Pakistani soldiers.	Indian victory
Badaber uprising	1985	(Soviet Union) Soviet POWs (Afghanistan) Afghan POWs	Mujahideen (Jamiat-e-Islami); Pakistan	The Badaber uprising was an armed rebellion of 52 Soviet and Afghan prisoners who were held at the fortress of Badaber on 26–27 April 1985. Though the prisoners managed to seize the complex from their guards and looted the local armory for weapons, they were quickly besieged by Mujahideen reinforcements and the Pakistan Army. For two days, the prisoners managed to hold off the attackers, but their situation remained desperate as they could not escape and negotiations with the Mujahideen failed. The battle eventually ended when the fortress exploded, either because the armory had been detonated by the prisoners or because an artillery shell had struck it. Almost all prisoners were killed in the explosion.	Pakistani and Mujahideen victory: almost all POWs killed, Badaber fortress completely destroyed
Battle of Tiger Hill	1999	Pakistan	India	40 Pakistani soldiers of the 5th Northern Light Infantry Regiment fought an estimated 200-800 Indian soldiers of different units in defending the captured peak of Tiger Hill (Point 5060) during the Kargil War. 35 out of 40 Pakistani soldiers were killed during the last stand notably Captain Karnal Sher Khan and Captain Ammar Hussain of the Pakistani Army both of whom were given the highest military awards by the Pakistani Government.	Indian victory, the leading commander of the Pakistani defending forces was killed
Siege of the Aleppo Central Prison during the Battle of Aleppo	2013–2014	Ba'athist Syria	(Syria) Free Syrian Army; Ahrar ash-Sham; Al-Nusra Front	During the opening phases Battle of Aleppo (2012–2016), the Syrian Army and allied militias: the National Defence Forces and Liwa al-Quds, were overwhelmed and sent into disarray across the whole area. In March 2013 around 300 soldiers who were guarding the prison were cut off in the Aleppo Central Prison, just north of the city of Aleppo. Rebel groups including Ahrar al-Sham, the Nour al-Din al-Zenki Movement, and the Syrian Branch of Al Qaeda, the Al Nusra Front, made multiple attempts to break through including with the use of manned car bombs. During the siege many prisoners took up arms and voluntarily joined the front on the outskirts of the prison. After holding out in the prison for a year, a special task force of the Syrian Army, the Tiger Forces which were led by General Suheil al-Hassan, were instructed to recapture the northern outskirts of Aleppo in what was codenamed Operation Canopus Star. By the time reinforcements arrived, the majority of forces holding the area were dead or wounded, with many prisoners dying of hunger. Many prisoners who took up arms in support of the army had their sentences shortened or were completely pardoned.	Ba'athist Syrian victory, reinforcements arrived
Battle of Sirte	2016	Islamic State (Libyan forces)	(Libya) Libyan Government of National Accord; United States; Italy	In May 2016, forces of the Libyan Government of National Accord (GNA) with support of an international coalition attacked the Islamic State-held city of Sirte. By this point, the Islamic State had already lost most of its territory in Libya, and it resolved to bitterly defend the town. Though part of Sirte's garrison broke out and escaped, the 2,500 Islamic State fighters left behind mostly fought to the death. The Government of National Accord declared the city cleared of Islamic State forces in December 2016.	Major GNA victory

== Naval last stands ==
Name	Year	Defenders	Attackers	Description	Outcome
Battle of Flores	1591	Royal Navy	Spanish Navy	During the Anglo-Spanish War of 1585, an imperial Spanish fleet of 53 ships came upon an unprepared English fleet of 22 ships in port at Flores in the Azores. Most of the English vessels were not prepared to do battle or flee, many being under repair and with crewmen ashore. As the English struggled to make sail and escape, Richard Grenville sailed his single ship, the 54-gun galleon Revenge, directly into the Spanish fleet. The grossly outnumbered Revenge fought fiercely and effectively through the night and into the next morning, by which time she was a floating wreck with most crewmen dead, and so surrendered. This action tied up the Spanish and allowed the rest of the English fleet to escape.	Spanish tactical victory
Battle of Myeongnyang	1597	Joseon Navy	Fleet of Toyotomi Hideyoshi	The battle had Admiral Yi Sun-Sin take the remaining 13 ships of the Joseon Navy and hold the Myeongnyang Strait against the 133 warships and over 200 supply ships of the attacking Japanese force. Due to Admiral Yi's remarkable skill as a naval commander, he destroyed 33 enemy ships and forced a Japanese retreat. Admiral Yi only lost ten sailors as none of his ships were sunk.	Joseon victory
Battle of Chemulpo Bay	1904	Russian Empire	Empire of Japan	The protected cruiser Varyag and the gunboat Korietz scuttled after the battle	Japanese victory
Battle of Antivari	1914	(Austria-Hungary) Austro-Hungarian Navy	(France) French Navy (United Kingdom) Royal Navy	The Austrian protected cruiser SMS Zenta and destroyer SMS Ulan were blocking the Montenegrin port of Antivari when they were suddenly ambushed and cut off by an unexpected sortie from a combined Anglo-French battlefleet. Zenta engaged the battlefleet alone to allow the Ulan to escape, which resulting in the Zenta's sinking with 173 killed and 50+ wounded.	Anglo-French Victory
The Iceland Gap Action	1939	(United Kingdom) Royal Navy: HMS Rawalpindi	(Nazi Germany) Kriegsmarine: Scharnhorst; Gneisenau	The engagement was between the armed merchant cruiser HMS Rawalpindi armed with eight 6-inch (152 mm) guns and two powerful German battlecruisers Scharnhorst and Gneisenau, armed with 18 11-inch (279 mm) guns and 24 6-inch guns. Rawalpindi sighted the German ships and the captain elected to go down fighting rather than to flee. Rawalpindi was sunk in 40 minutes, with the loss of 238 men.	German victory
HMS Glowworm action	1940	(United Kingdom) Royal Navy: HMS Glowworm	(Nazi Germany) Kriegsmarine: Admiral Hipper; Two German destroyers	The engagement was between the 1,370-ton destroyer HMS Glowworm and the 16,170-ton cruiser Admiral Hipper. Glowworm had attacked two German destroyers, which requested help from the cruiser. After the British destroyer fired all her torpedoes, and having her guns destroyed, she collided with Admiral Hipper, and sank. The Germans recovered 40 British sailors. Glowworm's commanding officer, Lieutenant Commander Gerard Roope was posthumously awarded the Victoria Cross on the recommendation of the German captain.	German victory
Battle of Convoy HX 84	1940	(United Kingdom) Royal Navy: HMS Jervis Bay; SS Beaverford; MV San Demetrio; Several merchant ships	(Nazi Germany) Kriegsmarine: German cruiser Admiral Scheer	On 5 November 1940, the German "pocket battleship" Admiral Scheer located and attacked convoy HX 84; the sole escort HMS Jervis Bay (an armed merchant cruiser) instructed the convoy to scatter and charged the much larger and more advanced ship. She managed to delay the Admiral Scheer for 22 minutes at the cost of many of the crew being killed or injured, including Captain Edward Fegen, who was later awarded a Victoria Cross for his actions. By the time HMS Jervis Bay had been sunk the merchant ships had all but scattered; however, the Admiral Scheer did manage to locate a small number of merchant ships, including the SS Beaverford, which, despite the very unequal matchup (The SS Beaverford having one 4-inch gun and one 3-inch gun, whilst the Admiral Scheer had six 11-inch guns alone), managed to further delay the attacking vessel for 4 hours in a cat-and-mouse game, using its speed and the smoke produced to allow the convoy to escape. However, the SS Beaverford was sunk with all hands.	German tactical victory, British strategic victory
The sinking of Bismarck	1941	(Nazi Germany) Kriegsmarine: Bismarck	(United Kingdom) Royal Navy: HMS Ark Royal; HMS King George V; HMS Rodney; 3 cruisers; 6 destroyers	After the German victory at the Battle of the Denmark Strait, the Royal Navy deployed a large force tasked with the destruction of the German battleship Bismarck to counter the destruction of the battlecruiser HMS Hood. Three days after the engagement, Bismarck was found and engaged in its final action. Over the course of the night, the British forces crippled Bismarck's steering gear and repeatedly harassed the Germans with attacks by British destroyers. On the morning of May 27, HMS King George V, HMS Rodney, and the cruisers all took part in the sinking of Bismarck. Admiral Tovey, who commanded the engagement, said that "The Bismarck had put up a most gallant fight against impossible odds worthy of the old days of the Imperial German Navy, and she went down with her colours flying."	British victory
Sinking of HMS Peterel	1941	(United Kingdom) Royal Navy: HMS Peterel	Empire of Japan: Izumo; Toba; Shore batteries	Due to the war in Europe most naval assets in the east had been recalled to serve in the Battle of the Atlantic, one of these remaining assets was HMS Peterel which served to dissuade the Japanese from moving against the foreign quarter of Shanghai. However, following the Attack on Pearl Harbor the Japanese moved against the Anglo-American assets in the area, seizing USS Wake, later demanding the surrender of HMS Peterel with an overwhelming force of the cruiser Izumo, the gunboat Toba, and several shore batteries. Despite this overwhelming force there was a need to stall for time in order to burn the code books and scuttle the vessel. In order to do this all possible resistance was rendered with the operational small arms (two Lewis guns being the most formidable) as the 3-inch (76 mm) guns had been disabled, until the vessel capsized and sank due to the weight of incoming fire with the loss of a large number of crew.	Japanese victory
Battle off Samar	1944	United States	Empire of Japan	The Battle off Samar had Task Unit 77.4.3 ("Taffy 3") fight against the Japanese Center Force. The Japanese flagship was the battleship Yamato, which alone outweighed all of Taffy 3 together. The Americans had a few destroyers, escort carriers, destroyer escorts, and 400 aircraft. The Japanese fleet had several battleships and heavy cruisers. Despite the mismatch, the Americans put up so much resistance, Admiral Kurita thought he was facing the entire Third Fleet and retreated.	American victory

== Last stands in aviation ==
Place of Action	Year	Defenders	Attackers	Description	Outcome
German-occupied Belgium	1917	Luftstreitkräfte: 1 Fokker Dr.I, piloted by Werner Voss; 1 Albatros D.III	Royal Flying Corps: 8 S.E.5s	High scoring German ace Werner Voss single-handedly faced off against British pilots James McCudden, Keith Muspratt, Harold A. Hamersley, Arthur Rhys Davids, Robert L. Chidlaw-Roberts, Geoffrey Hilton Bowman, Reginald Hoidge, and Richard Maybery. He was briefly assisted by an Albatros pilot before his comrade was defeated. Voss had a chance to climb above his opponents, due to the Fokker's higher ceiling clearance, and escape. But for unknown reasons, Voss dived back into the dogfight and attacked. Voss fired rounds into every one of his opponents but eventually was shot down by Rhys Davids. Afterwards, the British pilots held Voss with great respect and Rhys Davids wished he had brought him down alive.	British victory, Voss is shot down and killed
Over Nanjing, China	1937	(Taiwan) Republic of China Air Force: 2 Hawk IIIs	Imperial Japanese Navy Air Service: 11 Mitsubishi A5Ms; Several bombers	On 3 December 1937, a large Japanese bomber formation, escorted by 11 Mitsubishi A5Ms, attacked the airfield of the Republic of China Air Force's 21st Pursuit Squadron/4th Pursuit Group at Nanjing. At the time, the whole 21st Pursuit Squadron had only two operational Hawk IIIs left, flown by Captain Tung Ming-teh and Lieutenant Yue Yiqin. Despite their massive numerical disadvantage, Tung and Yue took off and engaged the Japanese attackers by themselves. In course of the following dogfight, the Japanese were victorious, with Yue shot down and Tung driven off. Yue was posthumously promoted for his courageous actions and buried at the Memorial Cemetery to the Anti-Japanese Aviator Martyrs, while Tung rose in rank to command the 4th Pursuit Group by 1939.	Japanese success, Yue Yiqin is killed
Over Oschersleben, Germany	1944	United States: 1 P-51	Luftwaffe: 30 Bf. 110.	The United States sent out a heavy bomber group that was escorted by a formation of P-51 aircraft led by Col. James H. Howard. During the mission, they met with a Luftwaffe force that attacked the bomber group. The Americans, in the process of defending their bombers, became separated from the bomber formation. Howard lost contact with his group and decided to return to the bomber formation, only to see that it was being attacked by the Germans. Instead of waiting for the rest of his group, he chose to defend against the 30 German planes alone. He fought by himself for 30 minutes, nearly out of fuel and out of ammunition; he continued to dive at the Germans until they withdrew. Howard would be awarded the Medal of Honor for his actions.	Successful defense of American bombers
Over Kashmir Valley	1971	India: 1 Folland Gnat	Pakistan: 6 F-86F Sabre Jet	In a dogfight against odds of 1:6 Flt. Lt. Nirmal Jit Singh Sekhon of India made a last stand against Pakistani Sabre Jet pilots 1. Wng Cdr Sharbat Ali Changezi, 2. Flt Lt H.K Dotani, 3. Flt Lt Amjad Endrabi, 4. Flt Lt Maroof Mir, 5. Flt Lt Salim Baig Mirza, 6. Flt Lt A. Rahim Yousefzai on 14 December 1971.	Pakistani bombers distracted. Nirmal Jit Singh Sekhon posthumously awarded the Param Vir Chakra,

== Last stands with few defenders ==
Place of Action	Year	Defender(s)	Attackers	Description	Outcome
Rome, Italy	69 AD	Sempronius Densus †	Followers of Otho	On January 15, 69, the Roman emperor Galba and his heir Piso were attacked on the streets of Rome by Praetorians who had defected to the usurper Otho. Instead of defending them, Galba and Piso's bodyguards promptly fled or joined the rebels. Only one centurion, Sempronius Densus, refused to abandon the emperor, even though he felt no particular affinity to Galba. Sempronius first attempted to remonstrate with the assassins, and then fought them to the death. While he managed to buy time for Piso to escape, he and Galba were killed. Soon after, however, Piso was found by Otho's followers and also killed. Due to his extraordinary sense of duty and bravery, Sempronius Densus's last stand was recorded by Roman historians as being the only heroic act done in Rome that day.	Galba and Piso are killed, Otho becomes Roman emperor.
Siege of Petra, Lazica, Georgia	551 AD	Sasanian Empire	Byzantine Empire	The Byzantines recaptured the strategic fortress of Petra, Lazica after a year-long siege, following another unsuccessful siege. The remaining Sasanian forces in the acropolis refused Bessas's offer of a safe withdrawal, who subsequently ordered it to be torched.	Byzantine victory
Battle of Karbala, Iraq	680 AD	Husayn ibn Ali and followers (the Shias)	Umayyad Caliphate	Muhammad's grandson Husayn ibn Ali was asked by the people of Kufa to lead an uprising against the new Umayyad ruler Yazid I, who was appointed by his father in breach of a previous agreement with Husayn's brother, according to which the Muslim world themselves should be choosing their future ruler. As Husayn and his small caravan was heading toward Kufa, the city's people shifted their loyalty out of fear. Husayn continued nevertheless, and his caravan was intercepted by the Umayyad army. He and his 72 followers fought to death, refusing to pledge allegiance to Yazid I. The dead are considered as martyrs by Muslims, and the event has a central place in forming the identity of the Shia Muslims.	Umayyad victory
Siege of Shahdiz, Iran	1107	Nizari Ismailis (the Assassins)	Seljuk Empire	A small remaining group of the besieged Nizari Ismaili defenders (around 80 men) at Shahdiz fortress refuse a safe withdrawal as per an initial agreement with the Seljuk army, which had laid a siege for a year. The ensuing battle is fought from tower to tower with most of the defenders being killed.	Seljuk victory
Siege of Maymun-Diz, Iran	1256	Nizari Ismailis (the Assassins)	Mongol Empire	The Nizari leader Khurshah capitulated to the invading Mongols under Hulegu. A small group of the Nizari garrison remained in a high building in the fortress and were defeated and killed after three days.	Mongol victory
The Defence of the Magazine at Delhi, British India	1857	British East India Company	Mughal Empire	The Defence of the Magazine at Delhi was an action of 11 May 1857 during the Indian Mutiny in which nine British soldiers of the East India Company defended the magazine at Delhi from rebelling sepoys. After more than four hours fighting against hundreds of attackers, and in order to deny the munitions to the enemy, the British defenders detonated the magazine, themselves with it.	The destruction of the magazine
Battle of Maiwand, Afghanistan	1880	(United Kingdom) British Empire	Emirate of Afghanistan	A force of 2500 British and Indian troops held positions outside of the village of Maiwand against an Afghan force numbering 12000 to 25000. Due to the positioning of the British force, insufficient ammunition reached the newly captured smoothbore guns, forcing the guns to retire to restock ammunition, the slackening of fire allowing the Afghans to force the wavering 130th Baluchis into retreat breaking the line and triggering a forced withdrawal. After which a small contingent of 11 men of the 66th Regiment stood as a rearguard until they ran out of ammunition, and charged the large number of Afghan infantry surrounding them; resulting in the deaths of the remaining men.	Afghan victory
Siege of Baler, Philippines	1898–1899	Spanish Empire	(First Philippine Republic) Philippine Republic	The Siege of Baler was a battle of the Philippine Revolution and concurrently the Spanish–American War and the Philippine–American War. Filipino revolutionaries laid siege to a fortified church manned by 50 colonial Spanish troops in the town of Baler, Philippines for 11 months, or 337 days. The war had ended in December 1898 with Spain's surrender and cession of the Philippines to the United States. However, cut off from communications with their own government and military, the Spanish forces in Baler continued their defense against the Filipino forces until 1899.	Filipino victory
Battle of Tirad Pass, Philippines	1899	(First Philippine Republic) Philippine Republic	United States	The Battle of Tirad Pass saw a rearguard of 60 Filipino soldiers fight a delaying action against a 300 strong American advance. The defenders suffered near total casualties, but fought long enough for President Emilio Aguinaldo and his troops to escape. The battle is now sometimes called the "Philippine Thermopylae."	Tactical United States victory Strategic Filipino victory
Monchy-le-Preux, Pas-de-Calais, France	1917	British Empire	German Empire	After a German counterattack at the village of Monchy-le-Preux, a desperate yet determined defence was mounted by a group of nine soldiers of the British Empire. This group consisted of one man from the Essex Regiment, and eight others from the Newfoundland Regiment, including Lieutenant Colonel James Forbes-Robertson, the leader of the defenders. Their goal being to prevent a force of some 300 Germans from advancing through the area and thus capturing Monchy, they held a position opposite the village's German-occupied assembly trench. The resistance offered by the group delayed the German force's relay of intelligence, concealing the truth of the defenders' inferior numbers. The nine men were eventually reinforced by a tenth soldier who had previously been knocked unconscious, and later by a group from the Hampshire Regiment. After hours of ceaseless fighting, the Germans were forced to retreat, having sustained over 40 casualties.	British defensive success: German takeover of Monchy-le-Preux prevented despite heavy British casualties; Defenders relieved
Battle of Saumur, France	1940	(France) Jehan Alain	Nazi Germany	Jehan Alain was a composer, organist, and motorcycle dispatch rider. On the 20th of June 1940, he was assigned to reconnoitre the German advance on the eastern side of Saumur, and encountered a group of German soldiers at Le Petit-Puy. Alain was riding his motorcycle around a curve when he heard the approaching tread of the Germans, he dismounted and killed 16 Germans with his carbine before being killed by the approaching force. It is unknown why he chose to engage the group rather than ride away.	Jehan Alain killed in action: Posthumously awarded the Croix de Guerre for his bravery.
The lone Soviet tank during the Battle of Raseiniai	1941	Soviet Union	Nazi Germany	During the battle for the village of Raseiniai, which took place 23–27 June 1941, a lone KV tank held off the advance of the 6th Panzer Division for a single day, before being overrun and knocked out on the morning of June 25.	German victory
Operation Anthropoid, Prague, Protectorate of Bohemia and Moravia	1942	(Czechoslovakia) Jan Kubiš † (Czechoslovakia) Jozef Gabčík † (Czechoslovakia) Josef Valčík † (Czechoslovakia) Adolf Opálka † (Czechoslovakia) Josef Bublik † (Czechoslovakia) Jaroslav Švarc † (Czechoslovakia) Jan Hruby †	Nazi Germany	Operation Anthropoid was the code name for the successful assassination attempt by Czechoslovak partisans on Reichsprotector Reinhard Heydrich who died from shrapnel injuries after a bomb was thrown at his car on 27 May 1942. The partisans took refuge in the Saints Cyril and Methodius Church in Prague. On 18 June they were ambushed by troops of the Waffen SS after being betrayed by fellow partisan Karel Čurda. For hours they were able to hold off repeated attacks before, with them running out of ammunition, they either died from their injuries or killed themselves to avoid capture.	All Czechoslovak partisans killed: Dissolution of the Munich Agreement
Sutoki-Byakovo, Novgorod Oblast, Russia	1942	(Soviet Union) Natalya Kovshova † (Soviet Union) Mariya Polivanova †	Nazi Germany	After Soviet soldiers repulsing the German offensive were gunned down or too injured to fight, only Kovshova and Polivanova, snipers, remained in battle, gunning down as many Nazis as possible. After running out of ammunition and having only four grenades left they waited to be surrounded by German soldiers, and when fully surrounded they pulled the pins on their grenades, killing themselves and surrounding enemy soldiers in order to avoid capture.	Kovshova and Polivanova killed in action: Posthumously Heroes of the Soviet Union
Shkodër, Albania	1942	(Albania) Branko Kadia † (Albania) Jordan Misja † (Albania) Perlat Rexhepi †	Italian protectorate of Albania	Kadia, Misja and Rexhepi (all members of the Albanian Partisans) were in Misja's home after being surrounded by 600 soldiers and police of the Albanian fascist forces. After refusing to surrender and a subsequent aerial bombardment on the home, the trio stormed out of the home and begun firing on the surrounding troops. After inflicting some losses, the trio were killed.	Fascist Albanian victory: Trio awarded Hero of the People
Saipan, Mariana Islands	1944	(United States) Thomas A. Baker †	Empire of Japan	On 7 July 1944, Thomas Baker's position came under attack by a significantly larger Japanese force. He was wounded in the initial assault, but refused to be evacuated and fought at close-range until his ammunition was expended. Baker insisted he be left behind when his comrades were forced to retreat. He was propped up against a tree with a pistol and eight bullets. When the position was retaken, he was found dead with the bodies of eight Japanese soldiers around him.	Baker is killed in action: Posthumous Medal of Honor
Saipan, Mariana Islands	1944	(United States) Ben L. Salomon †	Empire of Japan	Captain Salomon was the Surgeon for the 2nd Battalion, 105th Infantry Regiment, 27th Infantry Division when they were attacked by a massive Japanese force numbering somewhere between 3,000 and 5,000 soldiers. The Japanese bypassed the perimeter and started to attack Salomon's aid station. After killing seven of the attackers, he ordered the wounded back to the regimental aid station. He exited his aid station and manned a machine gun position to hold off the Japanese and cover the retreat of the wounded men for as long as possible. The American force retaking his position found him with 98 dead soldiers in front of him.	Salomon is killed in action: Posthumous Medal of Honor
Near the Po Valley, Italy	1945	(Brazil) Arlindo Lúcio da Silva † (Brazil) Geraldo Baeta da Cruz † (Brazil) Geraldo Rodrigues de Souza †	Nazi Germany	The three Brazilians were on patrol near the Po Valley when they were attacked by German forces, who requested their surrender. They took cover and returned fire, eventually running out of ammunition. They then mounted a bayonet charge against the German attackers, but were killed in the process.	The Brazilian soldiers are killed: They are honored by the Germans
Near Holtzwihr, France	1945	(United States) Audie L. Murphy	Nazi Germany	Murphy commanded Company B, which was attacked by six tanks and waves of infantry. Murphy ordered his men to withdraw to a prepared position in a woods, while he remained forward at his command post and continued to give fire directions to the artillery, killing large numbers of the advancing enemy infantry. He then climbed on a burning tank destroyer and employed its machine gun against the enemy. He was alone and exposed to German fire from three sides, but he killed dozens of Germans and caused their infantry attack to waver. The enemy tanks, losing infantry support, began to fall back.	German withdrawal: Awarded the Medal of Honor
Taungdaw, Myanmar	1945	(United Kingdom) Lachhiman Gurung	Empire of Japan	Gurkha Rifleman Gurung was manning the forward post of his platoon when they were attacked by 200 Japanese soldiers. He had already returned two thrown grenades when a third detonated in his trench. Despite being alone and severely injured, he defended his position for four hours until he was relieved.	Japanese withdrawal: Awarded the Victoria Cross
Kashmir	1947	Jammu and Kashmir (princely state)	Azad Kashmir	On the night of 21 October 1947, 6000 'Qabalis' or Muzahideen lashkar with an intention to loot and capture Kashmir Valley attacked Muzaffarabad. The J&K State Forces deputed at those points betrayed their defensive positions and from Kohala Bridge to Boniyar Bridge from 23 to 27 October 1947 only Rajinder Singh (brigadier) and 170 of his men made their last stand and resisted with the planned defensive strategy, they continued to fight until all perished, their sacrifice was enough for diplomatic decisions to be taken for the Indian Army to arrive in war theater to save Kashmir Valley.	Jammu and Kashmir (princely state) rule ended Jammu and Kashmir (union territory) & Azad Kashmir came into existence.: MVC (posthumous)Rajinder Singh (brigadier)
Machairas Monastery Near Lazanias, Cyprus	1957	(Greece) (Cyprus) Grigoris Afxentiou †	United Kingdom	On March 3, 1957, after a Cypriot informant betrayed his location, British Army troops surrounded EOKA insurgent Grigoris Afxentiou outside his secret hideout near the Machairas Monastery not far from Lazanias. At the time, inside the hideout were Afxentiou and four fellow EOKA insurgents. Realising he was outnumbered, Afxentiou ordered his comrades to surrender but stayed behind to fight to the death. The British asked Afxentiou to surrender his weapons, to which he replied "molon labe" ("come and take them"), quoting Leonidas I of Sparta. Afxentiou then used his submachine gun to kill a corporal of the Duke of Wellington's Regiment before dying after the Royal Engineers poured petrol into his hideout and set it on fire. The British buried his body at the Imprisoned Graves in the yard of the Central Jail of Lefkosia, where he remains interred to this day.	Death of Grigoris Afxentiou
Battle of Bum La Pass	1962	(India) Joginder Singh (DOW)	China	On October 23, 1962, 20 Indian soldiers commanded by Joginder Singh were attacked by a force 600 Chinese soldiers. Despite being outnumbered and outgunned, Singh contacted his superiors stating that he would hold until relived. While they would inflict heavy casualties on the Chinese, they would soon be out of ammunition. In a last ditch effort, Singh ordered his remaining soldiers to fix bayonets and charge the Chinese forces. The Indian forces would eventually be overrun and nearly all would be killed or captured. Singh would be captured, but would eventually succumb to wounds sustained during the battle. Singh would be awarded that Param Vir Chakra posthumously for leading the bayonet charge and single-handedly killing 50 Chinese soldiers, including several by bayonet.	Indian forces wiped out. Joginder Singh would die of his wounds.
Stand of the Group of Personal Friends, Chile	1973	Chile	(Chile) Chilean Armed Forces	During the 1973 Chilean coup, members of the Group of Personal Friends engaged conspirators in gunfights in the defense of president Salvador Allende. Eventually, Allende committed suicide, and many of the guards were killed in the fighting while others were captured and later executed during the Pinochet regime along with other political dissidents.	Armed Forces victory; suicide of Salvador Allende
Kabamba, Uganda	1986	Uganda National Liberation Front soldier	National Resistance Army	During the attack by rebels on Kabamba, a single soldier locked himself up inside the armory, fending off the rebels for five hours.	NRA victory, soldier was killed with an anti-tank mine.
Battle for Hill 3234, Afghanistan	1988	Soviet Union	Mujahideen Pakistan	The 345th Independent Guards Airborne Regiment was tasked with securing the road from Gardez to Khost, by maintaining a presence on Hill 3234. The 39 paratroopers landed on the hilltop on 7 January 1988, tasked with creating and holding a hilltop strong point from which to observe and control a section of the road beneath. An attack by 250 Mujahideen began at 1530 hrs. The first attack was followed by eleven more attacks supported by 200-400 more Pakistani troops until just before dawn on 8 January when the mujahideen retreated after suffering severe casualties, leaving Hill 3234 in the hands of the Soviet paratroopers.	Soviet victory
Battle of Kusonje	1991	Croatia	(Republic of Serbian Krajina) SAO Western Slavonia (Socialist Federal Republic of Yugoslavia) Yugoslavia	On 8 September 1991 a platoon of the Croatian National Guard was ambushed by Croatian Serb rebel forces while conducting a reconnaissance patrol. The platoon's gun truck was disabled and the troops abandoned it and took shelter in a nearby house. The surviving members of the platoon held out until they ran out of ammunition and refused to leave their wounded comrades. They surrendered the next day when the enemy managed to blow up the house only to be killed by their captors and buried in a mass grave. The bodies of the victims showed signs of severe torture and mutilation, including evidence of castration and bodies that had their ears, noses and fingers cut off.	Serbian victory: Bodies were exhumed in January 1992; Croatian authorities prosecuted four Serb rebels for killing of the prisoners of war
Siege of Bjelovar Barracks, Croatia	1991	(Socialist Federal Republic of Yugoslavia) Milan Tepić † (Socialist Federal Republic of Yugoslavia) Stojadin Mirković †	Croatia	During the Siege of Bjelovar Barracks, JNA forces at an ammunition storage depot just outside the city of Bjelovar became surrounded by Croatian forces. On 29 September 1991 and unwilling to leave the weapons to the enemy, Major Milan Tepić committed suicide blew up the warehouse and killing 17 Croatian soldiers. At a certain point before the detonation, JNA soldiers were ordered to withdraw from the main building to a safe distance. This order, issued by Tepić, was disobeyed by a conscript, Stojadin Mirković, who opened suppressive fire at the enemy from an armored personnel carrier, until he was hit by an anti-tank missile. In Croatia Milan Tepić is perceived as a war criminal who almost destroyed the town of Bjelovar.	Croatian victory: Tepić awarded Order of the People's Hero; Mirković awarded Medal of merit in the field of defense and security, first level
First Battle of Mogadishu, Somalia	1993	(United States) Gary Gordon † (United States) Randy Shughart †	(Somalia) Somali National Alliance Armed civilians	On 3 October 1993, Delta snipers MSG Gary Gordon and SFC Randy Shughart protected the crash site of helicopter 'Super 6–4' and injured pilot Michael Durant, whom they feared would be executed by a crowd of deadly rioters. Their first two requests to be inserted were denied, but they were finally granted permission after their third request. They inflicted heavy casualties on the approaching Somali mob. When MSG Gordon was eventually killed, SFC Shughart picked up Gordon's CAR-15 and gave it to Michael Durant. SFC Shughart went back around the helicopter's nose and held off the mob for about 10 more minutes before he was killed. The Somalis then overran the crash site and killed all but Durant. He was nearly beaten to death, but was saved when members of Aidid's militia came to take him prisoner.	Deaths of MSG Gordon and SFC Shughart: Awarded the Medal of Honor; Survival and eventual rescue of Michael Durant
Height 776, Argun Gorge, Chechnya	2000	Russia	(Chechen Republic of Ichkeria) ChRI	A company of soldiers resisted an enemy that was ten times their size.	The company's demise. At the cost of heavy losses, the enemy forces were able to break through the defenses
Najaf, Iraq	2004	(El Salvador) Cpl. Samuel Toloza	Mahdi Army	In May 2004, Cpl. Samuel Toloza was a member of the Cuscatlán Battalion a Salvadoran contingent of the coalition that occupied Iraq during the Iraq War. While moving between two bases his small contingent of less than twenty soldiers was attacked by a significantly larger force from the Mahdi Army. Heavily outnumbered, Toloza's element was soon reduced to four soldiers as the rest had been killed or wounded. With no ammunition left, Toloza attacked the members of the Mahdi Army with a 3-inch switchblade knife before being rescued.	Survival and eventual rescue of the Salvadoran element by a column of American soldiers.
Mexico, Tamaulipas, Near Ciudad Victoria, "Rancho San Jose"	2010	Alejo Garza Tamez, Mexican Navy	Los Zetas cartel	Members of the Los Zetas cartel demanded Alejo hand over his ranch property on the 13th of November 2010, giving him 24 hours to comply. Alejo, aged 77, refused to hand the property over. The following morning the cartel vehicles entered the ranch and were placed near the entrance to Alejo's house. The assassins fired a warning shot into the air, and proclaimed that they would forcefully seize the ranch. Garza Tamez responded with gunfire, and thus the armed gang responded by opening fire on the house, using rifles and grenades. Despite the numerical superiority of the cartel members, they were unable to take the ranch and fled before the arrival of Mexican Marines. Don Alejo took cover in the farm house, killing four of the attackers, while wounding two others. Don Alejo died of blood loss, the ranch is currently property of his brother.	Los Zetas Defeated, Alejo died in the conflict
Near Babaji, Helmand Province, Afghanistan	2010	(Nepal) (United Kingdom) Dipprasad Pun	Taliban	Dipprasad Pun of the Royal Gurkha Rifles was guarding his unit's compound when he was attacked by 30 insurgents. He was surrounded and was certain of his death, so he resolved to kill as many of the attackers as he could. He expended all 400 rounds of his ammunition, launched 17 grenades, detonated a Claymore mine, and beat the final attacker to death with his tripod.	Taliban defeated: Awarded the Conspicuous Gallantry Cross
Near Palmyra, Syria	2016	(Russia) Alexander Prokhorenko †	Islamic State	On 17 March 2016, during the Palmyra offensive, Senior lieutenant Alexander Prokhorenko of the Russian Special Operations Forces was discovered by Islamic State militants while identifying targets for Russian airstrikes. He was quickly surrounded, and requested evacuation, which was 12 minutes away. He found himself unable to reach the evacuation point, and low on ammunition. Knowing capture or death was inevitable, he requested an airstrike on his position to kill as many militants as he could that were surrounding him.	Death of Sen. Lt. Prokhorenko: Posthumously awarded the Hero of the Russian Federation
Near Uqayribat, Syria	2017	(Russia) Denis Portnyagin	Islamic State	On 16 August 2017, during the Central Syria campaign, a 4-5 man Russian SOF unit joined a group of Syrian government fighters, when they were unexpectedly attacked by IS militants. While some Syrian forces retreated and all the other members of his unit were injured, including the commander and the second officer, the youngest unit member, lance-corporal Denis Portnyagin, took a machine gun and fended off nearly 40 attacking terrorists, killing 14 of them. After bullets hit his helmet and his weapon, he continued to fight with grenades. According to Russian sources, Portnyagin even prepared to blow himself up with his remaining grenades and also draw fire onto his group had their position been overrun.	Survival and eventual rescue of Portnyagin's group: Awarded the Hero of the Russian Federation
Near Saraqib, Syria	2018	(Russia) Roman Filipov ‡‡	Syrian opposition	On 3 February 2018, during the 3rd Northwestern Syria campaign, Major Roman Filipov was shot down by a surface to air rocket during the Russian intervention in his Su-25SM. after landing Filipov held his ground as the militant fighters approached, exchanging fire with them with his Stechkin sidearm. He still had radio contact to the Russian airbase and reported that he killed two militant fighters. After being wounded, he blew himself up with a grenade as enemy fighters closed in on his position in order to avoid capture. His last words, as filmed by the militant fighters shortly before the grenade exploded, were "This is for our guys".	Death of Maj. Filipov: Posthumously awarded the Hero of the Russian Federation

== See also ==
- Battle off Samar
- Polish Thermopylae
- They shall not pass

== Bibliography ==
- Atiya, Samuel Bey (December 1924). "Senin and Ali Dinar". Sudan Notes and Records. 7 (2): 63–69.
- Cheung, Raymond (2015). Aces of the Republic of China Air Force. Oxford, New York City: Osprey Publishing. ISBN 978-1-4728-0561-4.
- Brnardic, Vladimir (2016). World War II Croatian Legionaries. Croatian Troops under Axis Command 1941-45. Oxford, New York City: Osprey Publishing. ISBN 978-1-4728-1767-9.
- Forczyk, Robert (2012). Panzerjager vs KV-1 Eastern Front 1941–1943. Oxford: Osprey Publishing. ISBN 978-1-84908-578-6.
- Gogos, Frank (2015). The Royal Newfoundland Regiment in the Great War. Flanker Press. ISBN 978-1-77117-336-0.
- de Groot, Bouko (2019). Nieuwpoort 1600: The First Modern Battle. Oxford: Osprey Publishing. ISBN 978-1472830814.
- Stühring, Henning (2014). Von Stalingrad bis Kursk: Als der Osten brannte, Teil II. epubli. ISBN 978-3844276091.
- The Memoirs of General Grivas by George Grivas, edited by Charles Foley. Longmans. London. 1964.
