= Samuel Toloza =

Salvadoran soldier awarded the Bronze Star for bravery in Iraq

- Born: Samuel González Toloza; 1979 (age 46–47); Santiago Nonualco, El Salvador
- Children: 4
- Military career
- Allegiance: El Salvador
- Branch: Salvadoran Air Force
- Service years: 1997–2010s
- Rank: Sergeant
- Nicknames: Scorpion, The Salvadoran Rambo
- Units: Special Forces Command; Cuscatlán Battalion II; Presidential Battalion
- Known for: Last stand during the Iraq War
- Conflicts: Iraq War
- Awards: Bronze Star Medal

Samuel González Toloza (born 1979) is a Salvadoran retired special forces soldier of the Salvadoran Air Force. He was a member of the Cuscatlán Battalion II during the Iraq War. Toloza is known for a last stand knife charge he carried out against militants of the Mahdi Army in Najaf in April 2004, for which he was awarded the Bronze Star Medal. Toloza later served in the Presidential Battalion and provided security for Salvadoran government officials during the presidencies of Antonio Saca and Mauricio Funes.

== Early life ==
Samuel González Toloza was born in Santiago Nonualco, El Salvador, in 1979. Several of Toloza's uncles and brothers were members of the Armed Forces of El Salvador during the Salvadoran Civil War (1979–1992). He also had one uncle who fought for the rebel Farabundo Martí National Liberation Front. Toloza's father, Juan González García, was killed during a machete fight in 1999.

== Military career ==
Toloza joined the Salvadoran Air Force in May 1997 as a member of the Security Battalion. Toloza joined the military due to his family's military history. He was particularly motivated to understand how one of his uncles died in a parachuting accident in May 1994. Toloza also viewed the military as a career as there were few job opportunities where he grew up. After one year, Toloza transferred to the Special Forces Command Paratrooper Battalion where he trained in sniping and anti-armor tactics.

In 2004, Toloza, then a corporal, was mobilized to Iraq as a part of the second contingent of the Cuscatlán Battalion, a unit of soldiers tasked with rendering humanitarian aid and overseeing infrastructure projects. On 4 April 2004, a Multi-National Force – Iraq (MNF–I) convoy that Toloza was with was attacked by the Mahdi Army in Najaf. The attack killed Natividad Méndez Ramos (the first Salvadoran killed during the Iraq War) and wounded 12 others. When the MNF–I soldiers ran out of ammunition, Toloza charged at the Mahdi Army militants and stabbed several with a knife for five minutes. The militants withdrew due to Toloza's counterattack and the Salvadorans were rescued by allied forces. Regarding the incident, Toloza remarked that "We never considered surrender. I was trained to fight until the end."

For Toloza's actions, he was awarded the Bronze Star Medal on the recommendation of United States Secretary of Defense Donald Rumsfeld. A yatagan knife, known as the "Toloza Knife", was named after him for his actions in Najaf and was advertised to military weapon collectors. A blog ran by former United States Army soldiers referred to Toloza as the "Badass of the Week". The Captain General Gerardo Barrios Military School adopted some of the tactics Toloza used during the attack for commando training.

From 2004 to 2007, Toloza returned to the Special Forces Command. In 2007, he became a member of the Presidential Battalion and served as security for Élmer Charlaix, the presidential private secretary for President Antonio Saca, and his family. During the presidency of Mauricio Funes, Toloza was reassigned to provide security for presidential private secretary Francisco Cáceres and his family. In 2013, Toloza provided security for Ricardo Perdomo, the minister of justice and public security. At some point, Toloza was promoted to the rank of sergeant.

== Post-military life ==
Toloza left El Salvador for the United States after being beaten and threatened by vigilantes who wanted him to join them. He sought asylum in the United States. As of 2019, Toloza lives in Indianapolis, Indiana.

== Personal life ==
Toloza is married and has four children.

== See also ==
- List of last stands
