= Cuscatlán Battalion =

Salvadoran military unit of the Iraq War

- Batallón Cuscatlán
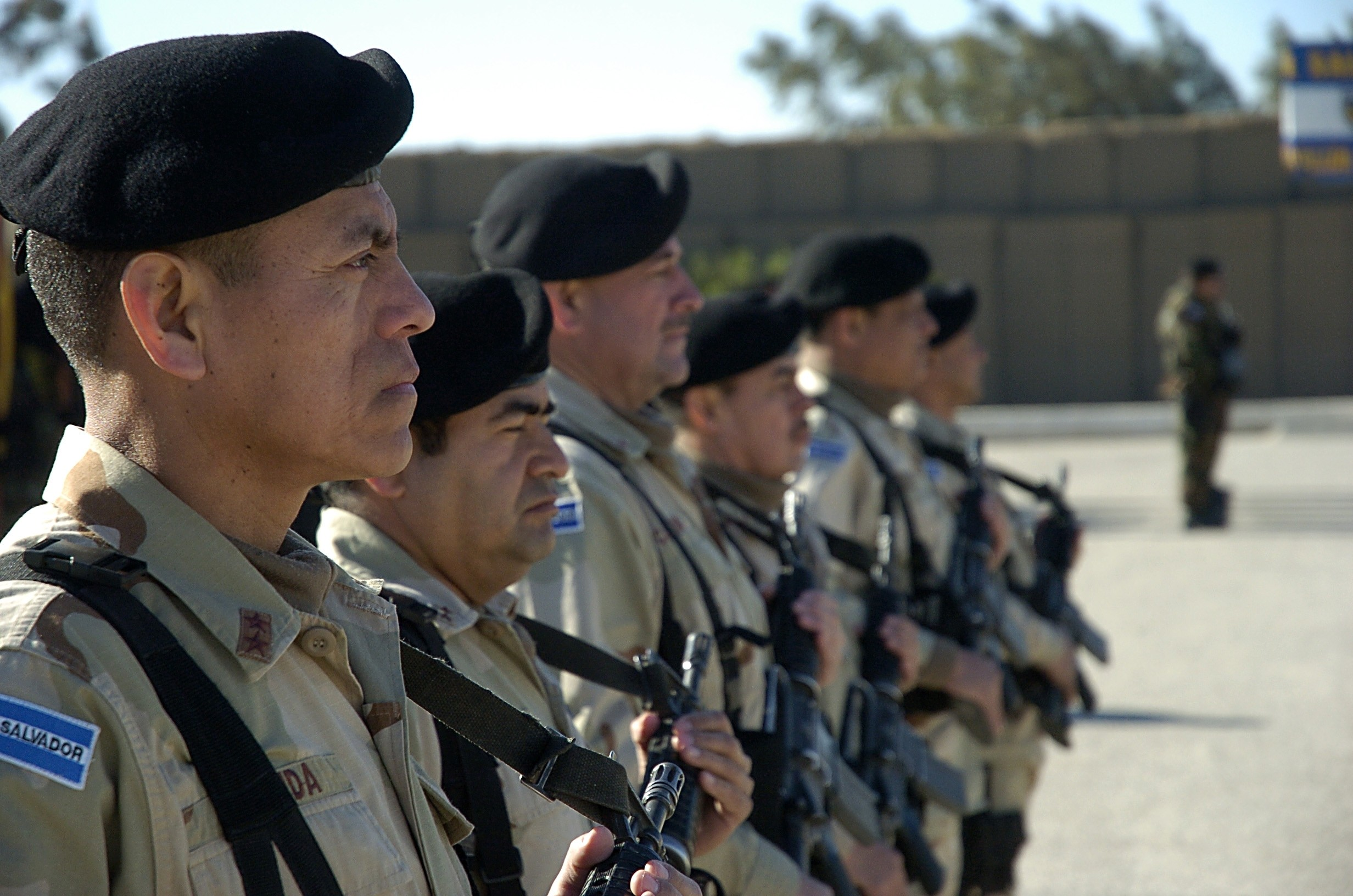
- Cuscatlán Battalion IX soldiers at Forward Operating Base Delta on 22 February 2008
- Active: 12 August 2003 – 22 January 2009
- Country: El Salvador
- Allegiance: Multi-National Force – Iraq
- Branch: Salvadoran Army
- Type: Ground force
- Size: 380 soldiers (peak); 5,800 soldiers (cumulative)
- Garrison/HQ: Najaf (2003–2005); Hillah (2005–2006); Kut (2006–2009)
- Equipment: See § organization
- Engagements: Iraq War

Commanders
- Commander: See § commanders

The Cuscatlán Battalion (Spanish: Batallón Cuscatlán) was a military unit of the Armed Forces of El Salvador (FAES) that participated in the Iraq War from 2003 to 2009. The Cuscatlán Battalion served under the Polish-led Multinational Division Central-South (MN–DCS) throughout its deployment. From 2003 to 2004, it was also a part of the Spanish-led Plus Ultra Brigade.

During the Cuscatlán Battalion's deployment, it rendered humanitarian aid, assisted in reconstruction projects, conducted demining operations, and protected Multi-National Force – Iraq (MNF–I) convoys. The battalion engaged in a few skirmishes against Iraqi militants during its deployment, suffering 5 deaths and 20 injuries. The Cuscatlán Battalion withdrew from Iraq in 2009 after years of debate in El Salvador over involvement in the Iraq War; the right-wing Nationalist Republican Alliance (ARENA) had supported involvement, while the left-wing Farabundo Martí National Liberation Front (FMLN) opposed it.

== Background ==
In May 2003, the United Nations Security Council approved Resolution 1483 that allowed the international community to support the United States and United Kingdom in rebuilding Iraq after the U.S.-led invasion of Iraq overthrew Saddam Hussein's government. On 11 June 2003, Salvadoran president Francisco Flores Pérez announced that El Salvador would send a contingent of soldiers to assist in rebuilding Iraq. The unit was named the Cuscatlán Battalion.

== Organization ==
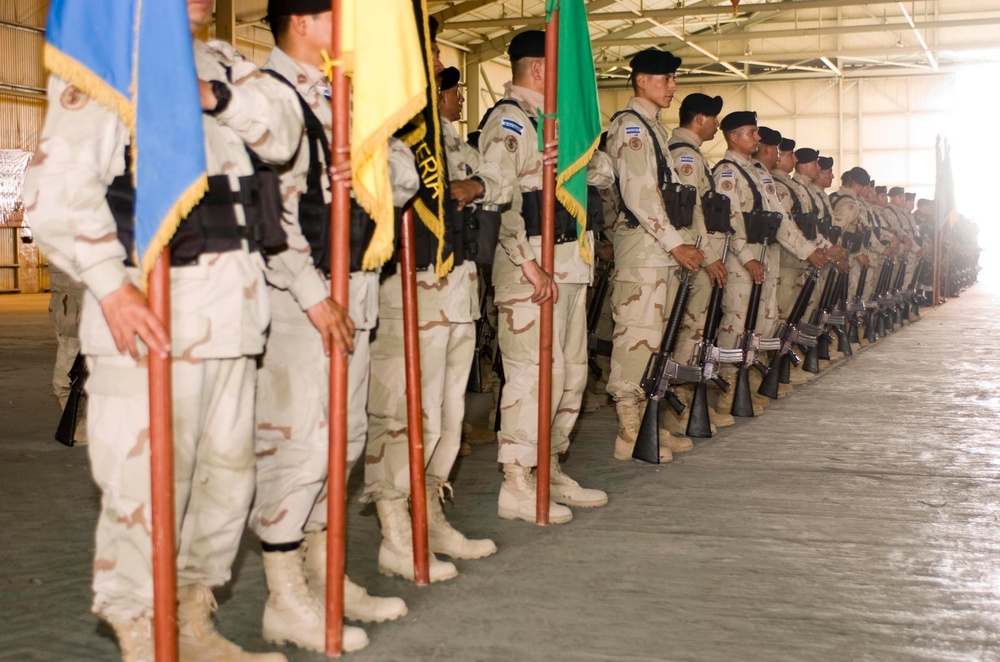
Cuscatlán Battalion X and XI soldiers in formation at Forward Operating Base Delta in 2008

The Cuscatlán Battalion was named after Cuzcatlan, an ancient group of Maya peoples that once lived in El Salvador. The battalion was composed of handpicked Salvadoran Army infantrymen, engineers, combat service support troops, and special forces soldiers. These soldiers helped render humanitarian aid to Iraqis and assisted in reconstruction projects. The Cuscatlán Battalion peaked at 380 soldiers, and a cumulative 5,800 soldiers served in the infantry battalion. The battalion was garrisoned in Najaf at Base El Salvador from 2003 to 2005, in Hillah from 2005 to 2006, and in Kut at Forward Operating Base Delta from 2006 to 2009.

Soldiers of the Cuscatlán Battalion were equipped with firearms that included M16A2 rifles; M2, M60, and M249 machine guns; M203 grenade launchers; and Beretta M9 pistols. They also operated Humvees and M35 cargo trucks equipped with M60 machine guns and tools to disarm improvised explosive devices (IEDs).

The main force of the Cuscatlán Battalion consisted of three infantry companies that had 80 infantrymen each. The three companies consisted of three infantry platoons and a command group. The battalion also had platoons of engineers, medics, logistics, security, communications, and commandos under three other companies.

== History ==
=== Deployment ===
On 12 August 2003, the Cuscatlán Battalion left El Salvador for Spain where the unit received various types of training before its deployment to Iraq. After completing their training, the battalion deployed to Iraq on 26 August as a part of the Spanish-led Plus Ultra Brigade along with soldiers from the Dominican Republic, Honduras, and Nicaragua. The Cuscatlán Battalion's 360 soldiers were garrisoned in Najaf and assisted the Polish-led Multinational Division Central-South (MN–DCS) in the Iraqi governorates of Al-Qādisiyyah, Babil, Najaf, and Wasit.

In February 2004, Nicaraguan forces withdrew from Iraq due to funding issues, and, by the end of 2004, the remaining members of the Plus Ultra Brigade, except for El Salvador, withdrew from Iraq due to public opposition to involvement in the Iraq War at home. The withdrawal of the Plus Ultra Brigade left the Cuscatlán Battalion as the only remaining Latin American military unit in Iraq. After the Plus Ultra Brigade withdrew, El Salvador increased the number of soldiers in the Cuscatlán Battalion from 360 to 380.

=== Engagements ===
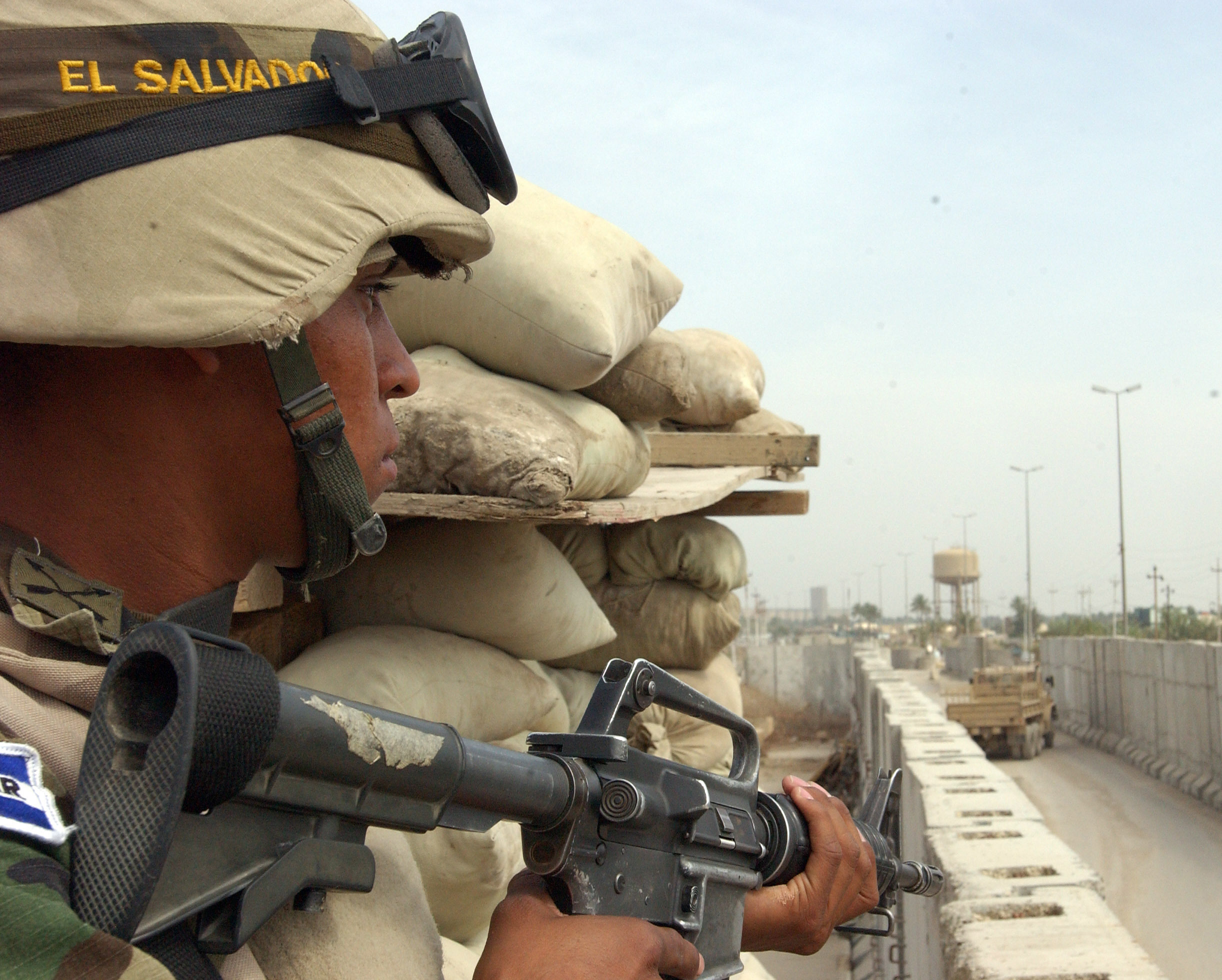
A Cuscatlán Battalion IV soldier at Camp Charlie in 2005

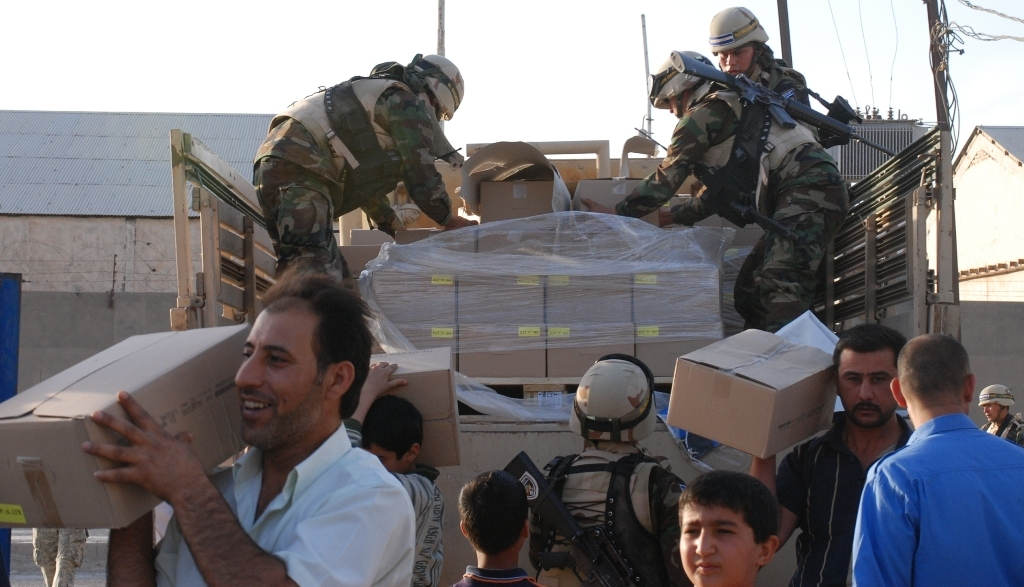
Soldiers of the Cuscatlán Battalion X delivering medical supplies at Forward Operating Base Delta in 2008

Throughout Cuscatlán Battalion's deployment, it continued to render humanitarian aid through distributing food and clothes and providing medical treatment. It also helped reconstruct homes, roads, schools, hospitals, water-treatment plants, and other infrastructure that had been destroyed by the war. In addition to this, Salvadoran soldiers also provided security to Multi-National Force – Iraq (MNF–I) convoys and conducted demining operations.

On 4 April 2004, militants of the Mahdi Army ambushed an MNF-I convoy that the Cuscatlán Battalion was protecting at the Al Ándalus Base in Najaf. The ambush killed one soldier, Private Natividad Méndez Ramos, and injured twelve more. When the four remaining soldiers ran out of ammunition, Corporal Samuel González Toloza fended off militants with a knife in hand-to-hand combat until reinforcements arrived. On 7 May 2004, Flores awarded the Cuscatlán Battalion the Golden Medal to Merit for its service in Najaf. On 12 November 2004, United States Secretary of Defense Donald Rumsfeld awarded six Salvadoran soldiers the Bronze Star Medal for their actions in the ambush.

Cuscatlán Battalion suffered a number of additional deaths and injuries. On 27 July, Carlos Armando Godoy Castro was killed in a vehicle accident in Hillah. On 19 July 2006, a convoy of six Cuscatlán Battalion Humvees was ambushed by Iraqi militants outside Kut when an IED was detonated under one of the Humvees. The explosion killed one soldier, Sub-Sergeant José Miguel Perdomo Sánchez, and injured another. On 27 July, another ambush by militants killed one soldier, Sub-Sergeant Donald Alberto Ramírez García, and injured another. On 27 August, Iraqi militants launched a mortar attack on Forward Operating Base Delta (the battalion's garrison at the time) but nobody was killed or injured. On 20 October, militants attacked another Salvadoran convoy with an IED detonation outside An Numaniyah. The attacked killed one soldier, Captain José Argelio Soto Ochoa, and injured four more.

=== Opposition ===
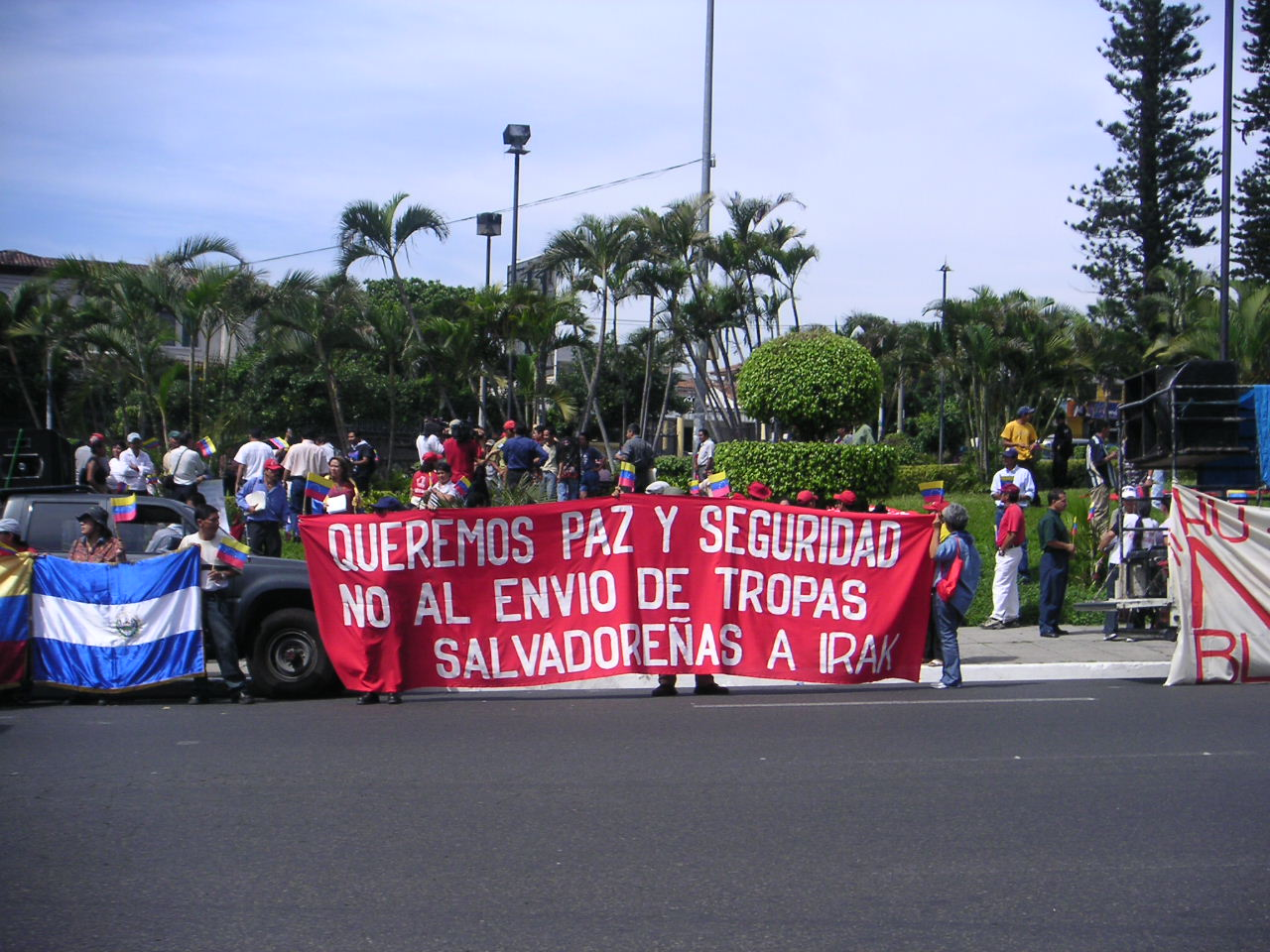
Salvadorans in San Salvador protesting against El Salvador's involvement in the Iraq War in 2004

Opinion polls in El Salvador found that a majority of Salvadorans opposed involvement in the Iraq War. One opinion poll conducted by La Prensa Gráfica in December 2006 found that 81 percent of Salvadorans opposed sending more soldiers to Iraq while only 12 percent supported sending more soldiers. Some Salvadorans also held protest rallies against involvement.

El Salvador's government at the time was controlled by the right-wing Nationalist Republican Alliance (ARENA), and ARENA presidents Flores (1999–2004) and Antonio Saca (2004–2009) had strong relations with U.S. president George W. Bush. While ARENA supported involvement in the war, the left-wing opposition Farabundo Martí National Liberation Front (FMLN) opposed involvement. Votes within the Legislative Assembly of El Salvador to extend El Salvador's involvement in the Iraq War were divided along partisan lines with ARENA, the Christian Democratic Party (PDC), and National Conciliation Party (PCN) voting in favor of extensions and the FMLN voting against extensions. During the 2004 Salvadoran presidential election, FMLN nominee Schafik Hándal promised to withdraw the Cuscatlán Battalion from Iraq, while Saca warned that doing so would risk the U.S. canceling the temporary protected status of Salvadorans living in the U.S. in retaliation for withdrawing.

=== Withdrawal ===
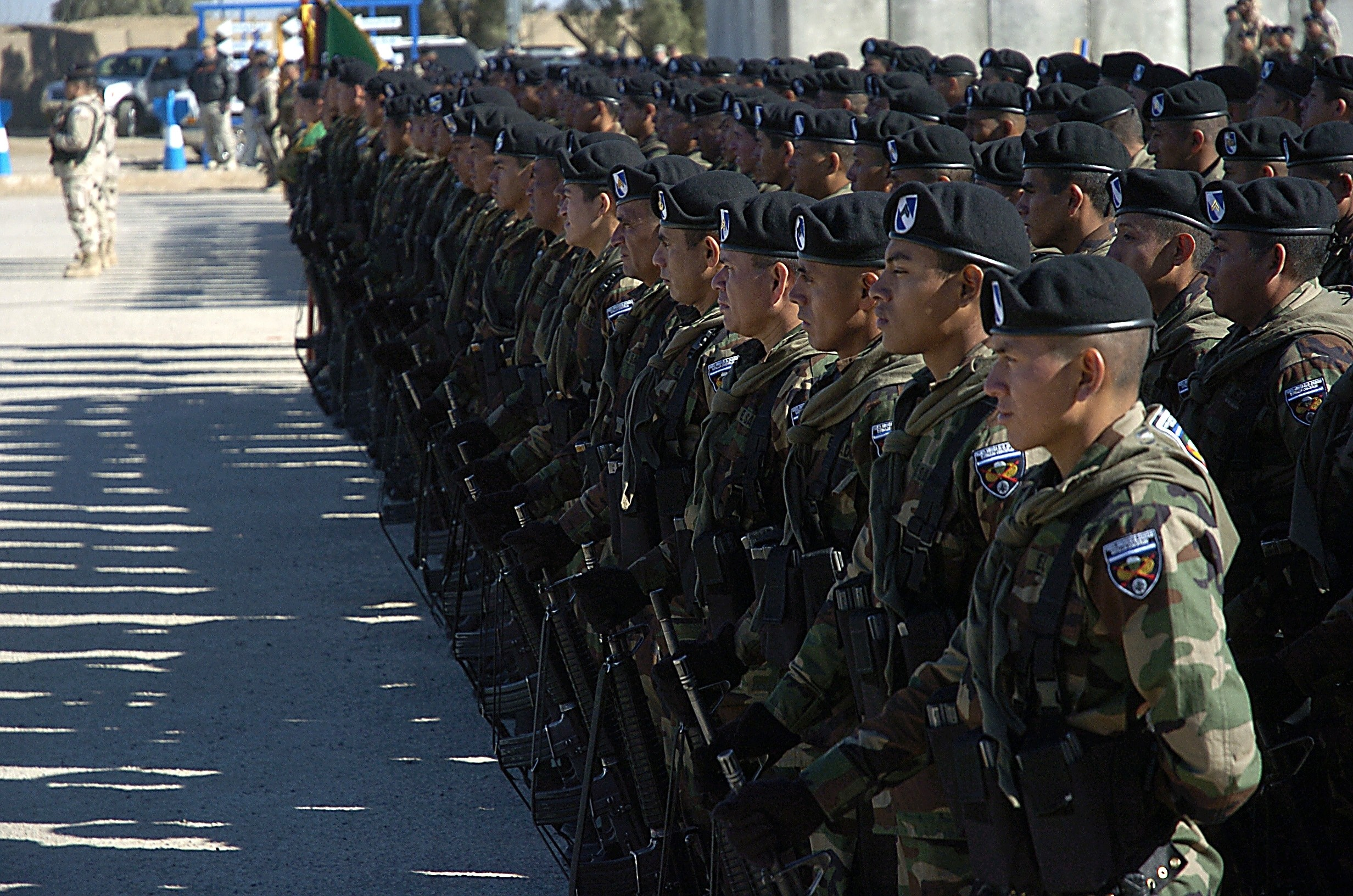
Cuscatlán Battalion IX soldiers at Forward Operating Base Delta in 2008

In 2007, the Salvadoran government reduced the number of soldiers in the Cuscatlán Battalion from 380 to 280. On 18 December 2008, the Iraqi government signed an agreement with the Salvadoran government to allow the Cuscatlán Battalion to remain in Iraq until the end of 2009. This came as the United Nations' mandate to intervene in Iraq was set to expire on 31 December 2008. Regardless, on 23 December, Saca announced that the Cuscatlán Battalion would withdraw from Iraq shortly after the UN mandate expired. In his announcement, Saca told reporters "mission accomplished". Saca had previously justified El Salvador's participation in the Iraq War by stating that the country's participation was to thank the international community for supporting the Salvadoran government during the Salvadoran Civil War of 1979 to 1992. He also stated that El Salvador was sending a message to the Iraqi people that it was "possible to rebuild [their] country even from ashes and to procure a future for [their] children and generations to come".

The battalion withdrew from Iraq on 22 January 2009 and its last soldiers returned to El Salvador on 7 February. Divisional General Otto Romero, the minister of national defense during Saca's presidency, stated in February 2009 that the Cuscatlán Battalion had completed 353 infrastructure projects and 191 humanitarian aid missions that cost around US$30 million. In total, five Cuscatlán Battalion soldiers were killed in Iraq (four in combat and one in an accident) and twenty more were wounded.

== Commanders ==
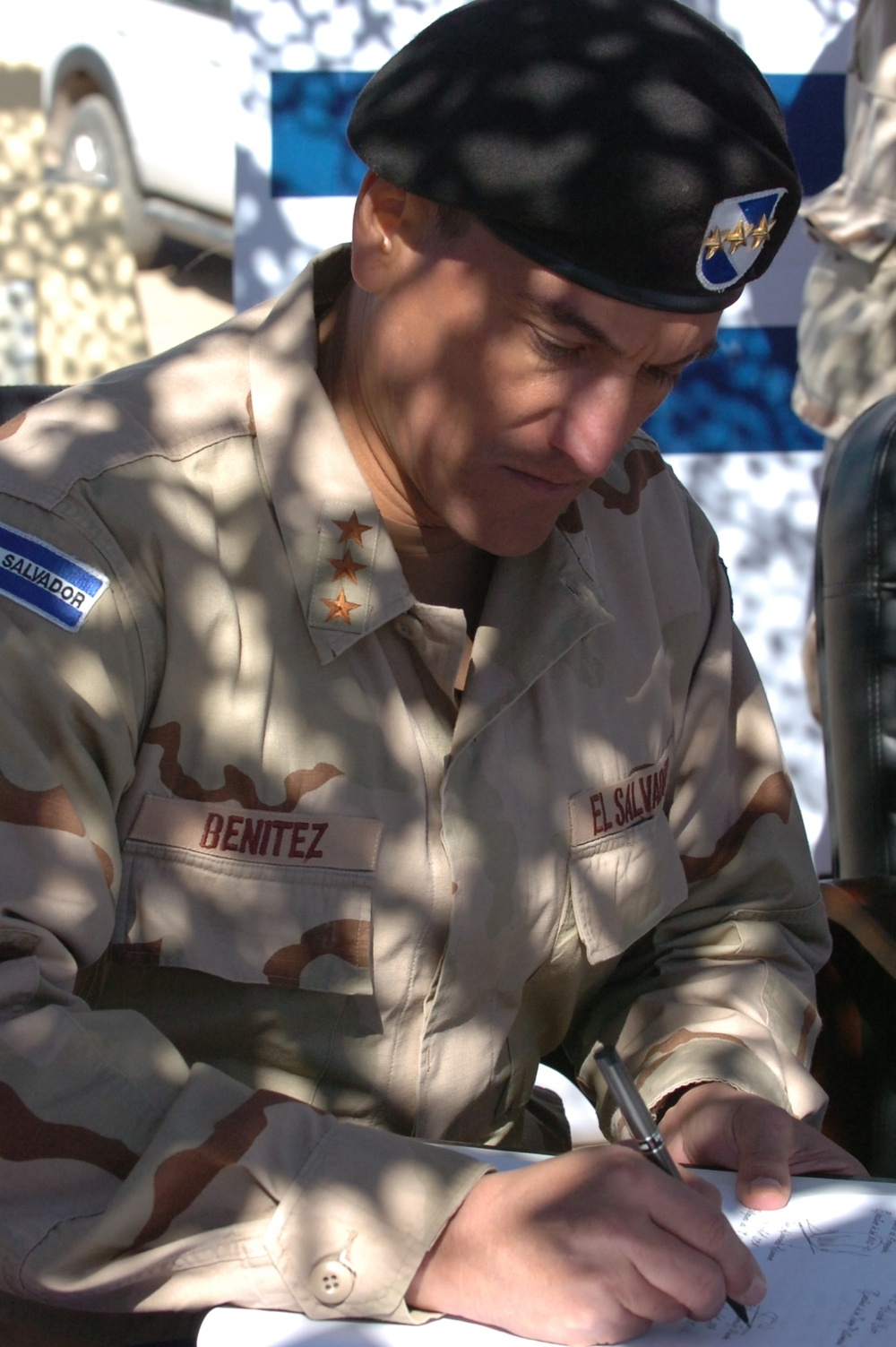
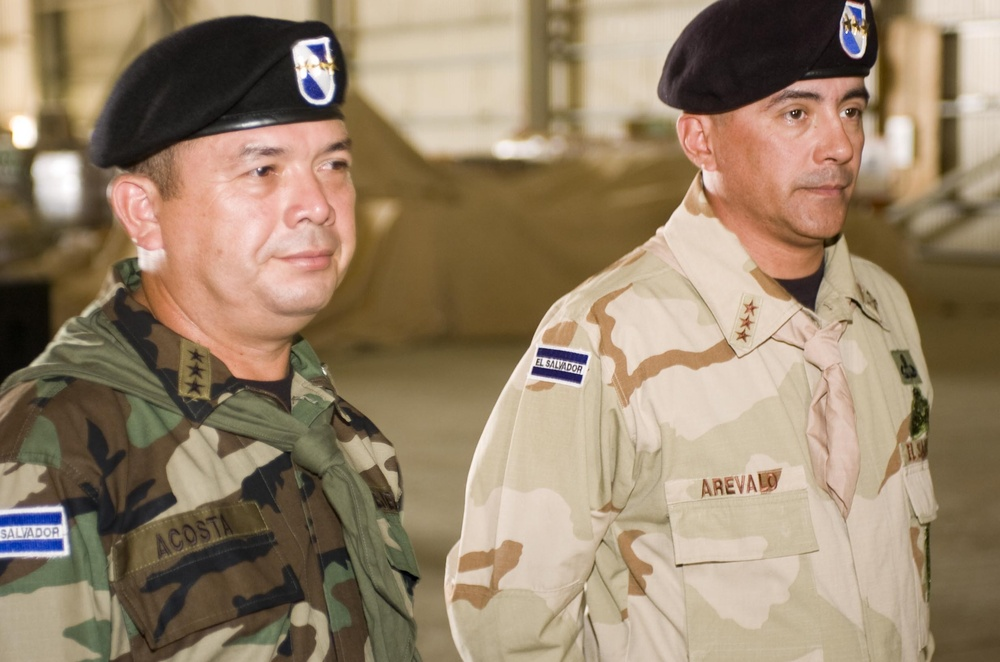
Colonels Atilio Benítez, César Acosta, and Walter Arévalo, the Cuscatlán Battalion's last three commanders

Commander		Rank	Command began	Command ended	Rotation	Refs.
1	Santiago Sabino Monterroza	Lieutenant colonel	12 August 2003	February 2004	I	
2	Hugo Omar Orellana Calidonio	Colonel	February 2004	31 August 2004	II	
3	Roberto Artiga Chicas	Colonel	31 August 2004	February 2005	III	
4	William Igdalí Moreno Segovia	Colonel	February 2005	August 2005	IV	
5	Rubén Oswaldo Rubio Reyes	Colonel	August 2005	16 February 2006	V	
6	Julio Armando García Oliva	Colonel	16 February 2006	August 2006	VI	
7	Joaquín Roberto Gálvez Molina	Colonel	August 2006	February 2007	VII	
8	Víctor Manuel Bolaños Carballo	Colonel	February 2007	August 2007	VIII	
9	José Atilio Benítez Parada	Colonel	August 2007	22 February 2008	IX	
10	Walter Mauricio Arévalo Gavidia	Colonel	22 February 2008	26 August 2008	X	
11	César Adonai Acosta Bonilla	Colonel	26 August 2008	7 February 2009	XI	

== See also ==
- Atlácatl Battalion
- Salvadoran military intervention in Haiti
