= Ubaydah Bin Al Jarrah Air Base =

Military airbase in Wasit Governorate, Iraq

Ubaydah Bin Al Jarrah Air Base (al-Kut Air base) FOB Delta
- Near Kut, Wasit Governorate in Iraq
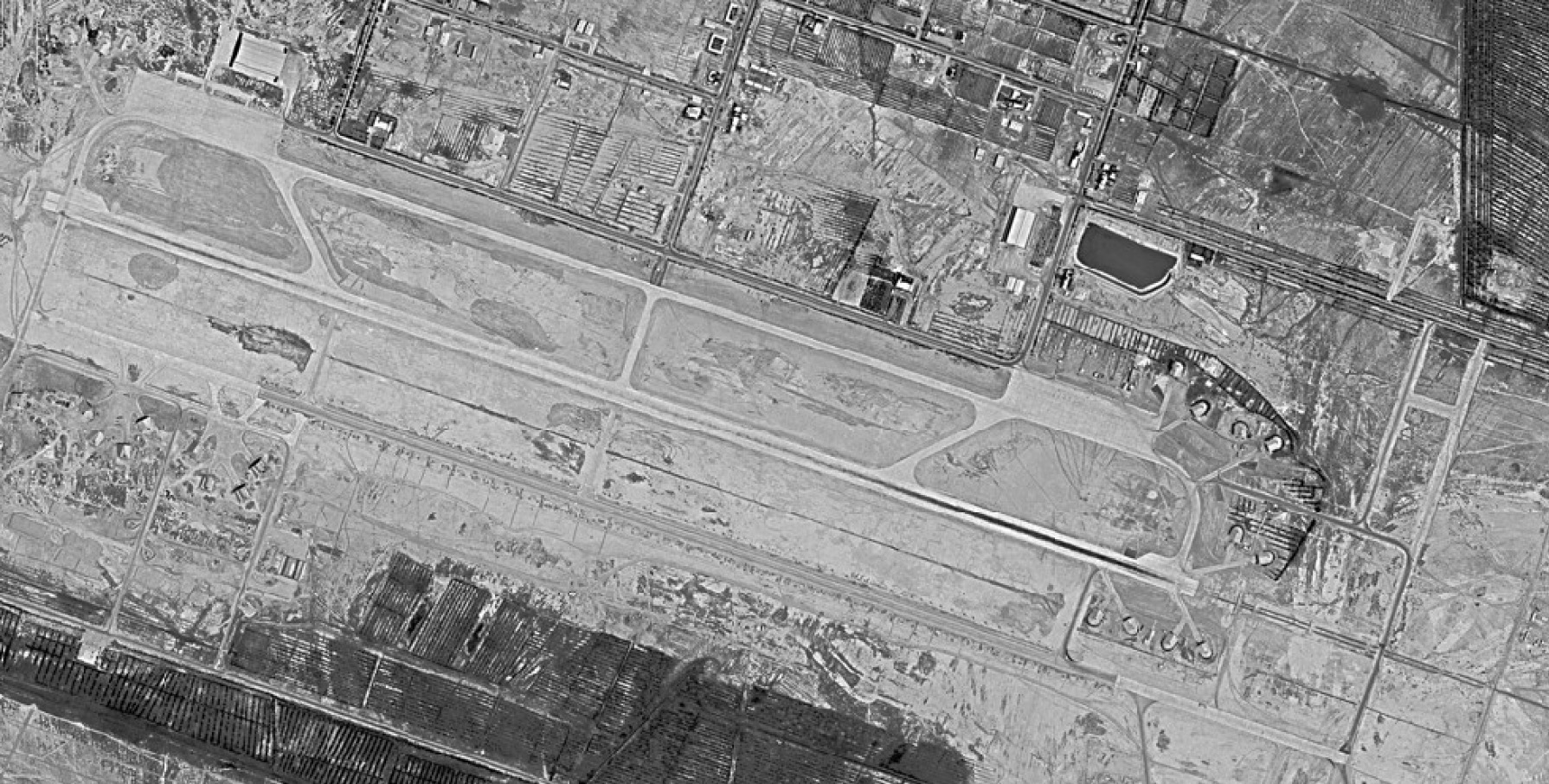
- Declassified satellite imagery depicting Kut Air Base captured by KH-9 Hexagon on 27 August, 1984.

Site information
- Owner: Ministry of Defence
- Operator: Iraqi Air Force; 1973-2003; United States Army; 2003-2011; Iraqi Army Aviation Corps; 2012—Present

Location
- Shown within Iraq
- Coordinates: 32°29′01″N 045°45′21″E

Site history
- Built: 1973
- In use: 1973–present

Airfield information
- Identifiers: IATA: ORUB
- Elevation: 130 metres (427 ft) AMSL
Runways
Direction	Length and surface
11/29 L	3,170 metres (10,400 ft) Asphalt
11/29 R	3,070 metres (10,072 ft) Asphalt

Ubaydah Bin Al Jarrah Air Base (al-Kut Air base) is an Iraqi Army Aviation Corps base near Kut, Wasit Governorate, Iraq. It was captured by U.S.-led Coalition forces during Operation Iraqi Freedom in 2003.

== History ==
Ubaydah Bin Al Jarrah Air Base was one of several Iraqi Air Force airfields in the mid-1970s which were re-built under project "Super-Base" in response to the experiences from the Arab-Israeli wars in 1967 and 1973.

Originally, 13 airfields were re-built by British contractors, all having a number of hardened aircraft shelters. Subsequently, companies from Yugoslavia – previously engaged in building bridges in Iraq – became involved. Due to their specific construction of these airfields - which included taxi-ways leading right out of Hardened Aircraft Shelters (HAS) and laid diagonally to the runways - they became known as "Trapezoids" or "Yugos".

The facilities were divided into two categories: "surface" and "underground". The "surface" facilities were actually the "softest", and included maintenance hangars of metal construction, and HAS of concrete construction. In total, the Yugoslavs built no less than 200 HAS on different airfields in Iraq during the 1980s.

The protection of each HAS consisted of one-metre-thick concrete shells, reinforced by 30 cm thick steel plates. There was only one entrance and this was covered by sliding doors, made of 50-cm-thick steel armoured plate and concrete. The HAS were usually built in small groups, seldom more than five, with each group sharing the same water and power supply, besides having its own backup gasoline-powered electrical generator, and each HAS being equipped with a semi-automatic aircraft-refuelling system.

In addition, underground facilities that could shelter between four and ten aircraft on average were constructed. In order to build these, the Yugoslavs used equipment and construction techniques identical to those used in underground oil-storage depots, additionally concealing the extension and the true purpose of the whole project. The underground facilities were all hardened to withstand a direct hit by a tactical nuclear bomb, buried up to 50 meters below the ground and consisted of the main aircraft "hangar" (consisting of two floors in several cases, connected by 40ts hydraulic lifts), connected with operations, maintenance, and logistical facilities via a net of underground corridors.

Under Iraqi Air Force control, this was a base for a full wing with three squadrons of Su-20/22s and a squadron of MiG-21s or MiG-23s for air defence. It was heavily hit by the RAF in 1991 during Operation Desert Storm, but was repaired subsequently and it remained a Su-22 base in the 1990s as well.

It was relatively undamaged despite additional hits during Operation Desert Storm and Operation Iraqi Freedom.

=== Modern Era - U.S. invasion and occupation ===
The base was abandoned by Iraqi forces and was used by United States Army after its seizure. During U.S. occupation, the air base was known as Forward Operating Base Delta and Camp Delta During 2011 it was known as Contingency Operating Base Delta

During 2008, it was home to troops from the United States, Poland, Lithuania, Georgia, El Salvador, Kazakhstan and Romania. During 2009, it was home to the 41st Fires Brigade until August 2009 when 1st Battalion, 77th Field Artillery Regiment took over.

From June 2011 the base was home to 6th ‘Saber’ Squadron, 9th Cavalry Regiment, 3rd Advise and Assist Brigade, 1st Cavalry Division, United States Division – South until October 2011.

The base personnel were also supported from personnel from other bases.

=== Return to Iraqi Control ===
Current aerial photography shows many abandoned buildings on the former air base, however, the runway and taxiways are intact with a standing hangar on one of the parking areas. Helicopters can be seen in a dispersal area in addition to numerous vehicles and conex boxes. Beginning in 2015, the base was used to launch drone strikes on ISIS targets.

According to Scramble.nl the base is now used by the Iraqi Army Aviation Corps

== See also ==
- List of United States Military installations in Iraq
