= 1926 KLM Fokker F.VII crash =

1926 aviation accident in Belgium

KLM Wolvertem H-NACC crash
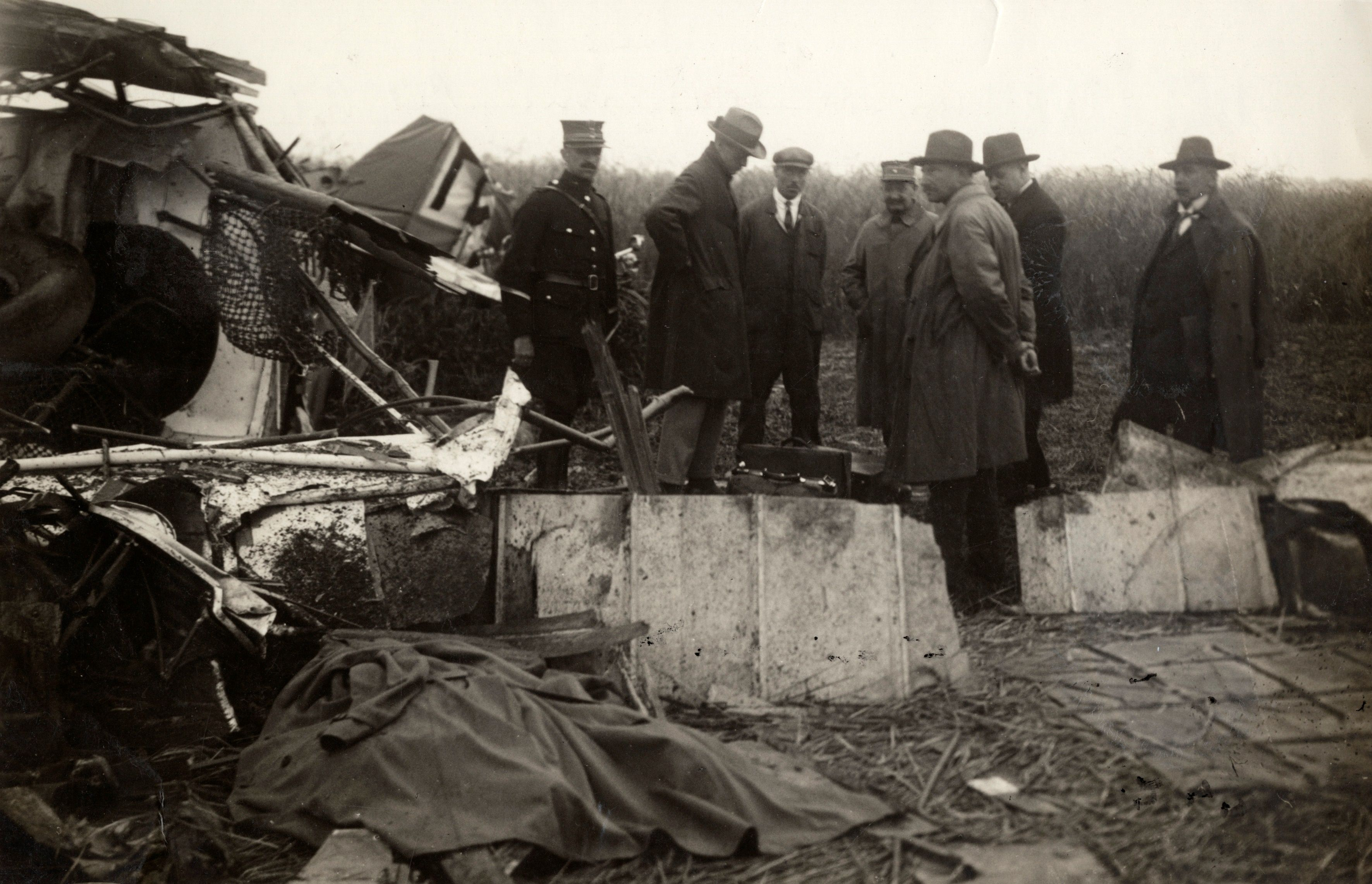
- Aftermath of the crash

Occurrence
- Date: 9 July 1926
- Summary: Controlled flight into terrain due to dense fog
- Site: Wolvertem, near Brussels, Belgium

Aircraft
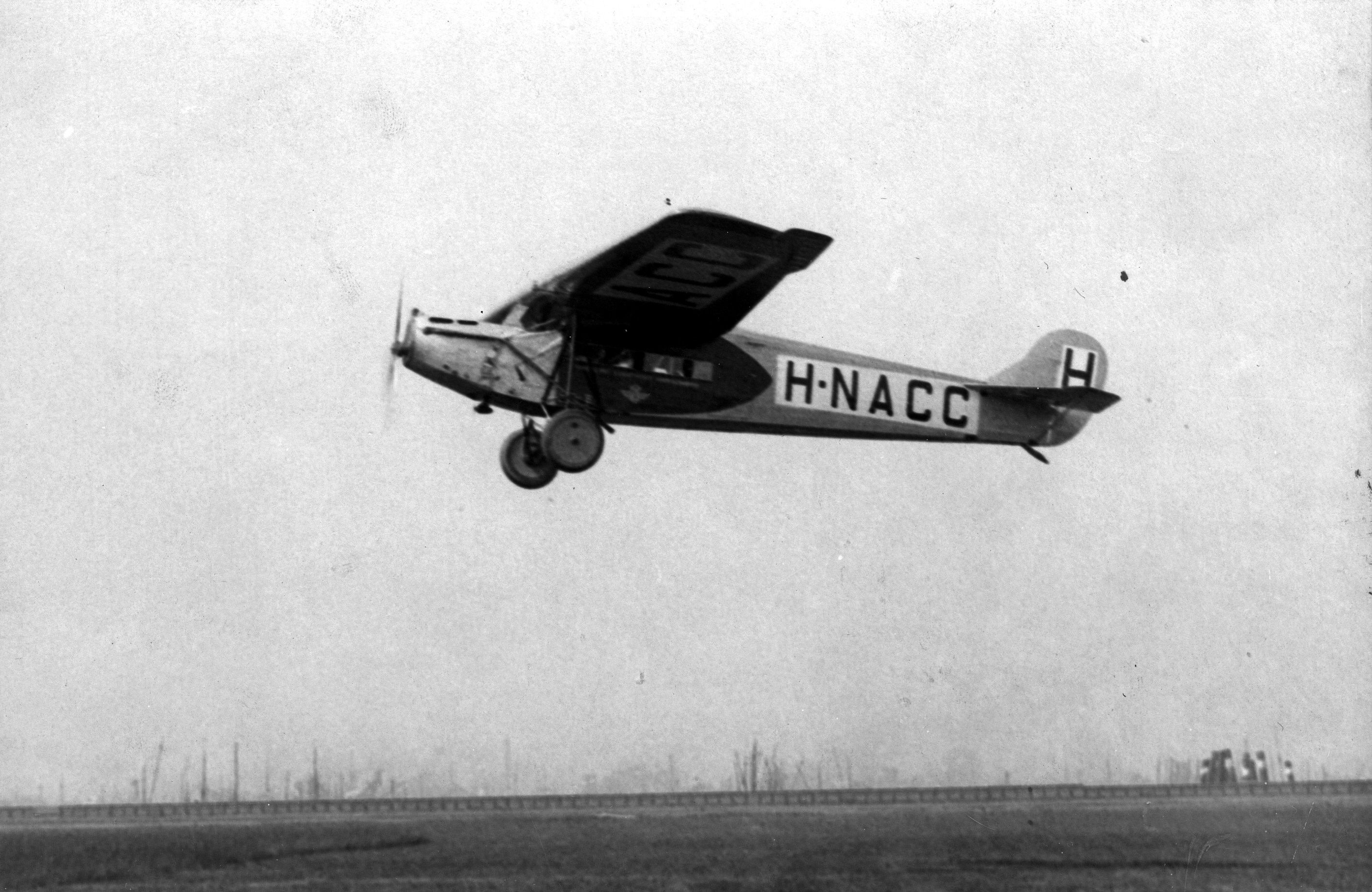
- H-NACC, the aircraft involved, photographed in 1924
- Aircraft type: Fokker F.VII
- Operator: KLM
- Registration: H-NACC
- Flight origin: Waalhaven Airport, Rotterdam, Netherlands
- Destination: Paris, France
- Occupants: 2
- Passengers: 1
- Crew: 1
- Fatalities: 2
- Survivors: 0

The KLM Wolvertem H-NACC crash occurred on 9 July 1926 when a KLM-operated scheduled passenger flight with a Fokker F.VII (registration H-NACC) crashed near Wolvertem, approximately 15 km northwest of Brussels, Belgium. The aircraft was on the Amsterdam-Brussels-Paris flight. It encountered dense fog during the flight from Rotterdam to Paris and crashed while attempting to maintain visual contact with the ground. Both people on board were killed.

The crash was largely the result of challenging weather conditions combined with the technological and operational limitations of early aviation. It crashed raised awareness for improvements in meteorology and navigation systems that would be essential to improve flight safety.

The crash was among the earliest deadly commercial passenger flights, and was the third deadly accident of the KLM since its foundation in 1919 after the 1924 Fokker F.III disappearance and 1925 Fokker F.III Forêt de Mormal crash.

== Aircraft ==
The aircraft involved was a Fokker F.VII, registered H-NACC, built in 1923–1924 at the Fokker factory in Amsterdam with factory number 4759. It made its first test flight on 23 April 1924 and was registered to KLM on 13 June 1924.

The Fokker F.VII was designed as a successor to the Fokker F.III and could carry up to eight passengers. The H-NACC was the first of this type ordered by KLM and underwent extensive testing and modifications before entering regular service.

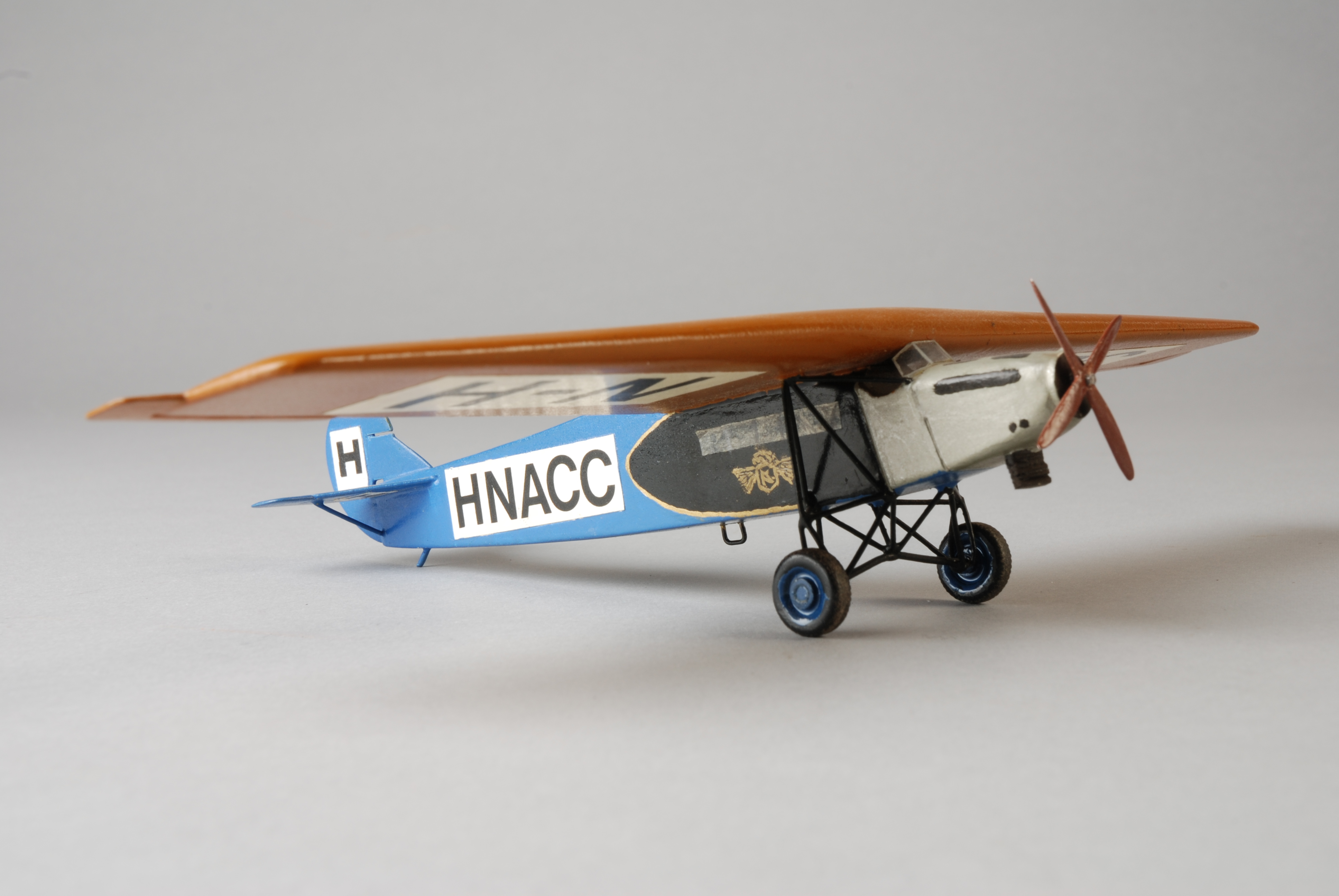
Scale model of the involved aircraft

The aircraft was originally powered by a Rolls-Royce Eagle VIII engine producing 360 horsepower. It had a maximum takeoff weight of 3,255 kg, a range of approximately 1,230 km, and a maximum speed of around 152 km/h. The aircraft just had new 400 horsepower Jupiter engines that had made 80 flight hours.

The H-NACC became historically significant in 1924 after completing first flight from the Netherlands to Batavia. Dutch East Indies, marking a milestone in Dutch aviation history.

== Crew and passenger ==
Next to the pilot there was only one passenger on-board, while the capacity of the aircraft was for eight passengers. Both were killed in the crash.

- A.C. de Vree (aged 32), the pilot, was known as a careful and experienced aviator and was experienced on this route. He had been married for three years and had no children.
- W. Hepner (aged 51) was director of the Amsterdam grain firm L. Hoyak & Co. He held several public roles, including membership in the supervisory board of the Amsterdamsche Bank and involvement with the Koninklijke Nederlandse Vereniging voor Luchtvaart (KNVvL). He was an experienced air traveler and had completed the Schiphol–Paris route approximately 100 times.

== Accident ==
On 9 July 1926 the aircraft was on a scheduled Amsterdam-Brussels-Paris air route operated by the KLM. At 09:03 local time, the aircraft departed from Waalhaven Airport in Rotterdam. During this leg, near Wolvertem, the aircraft encountered unexpectedly dense and localized fog.

Unable to maintain orientation in the poor visibility, the pilot circled the area for approximately 20 minutes searching for clearer conditions. Eventually, he descended to a low altitude, estimated at around 50 meters, to regain visual contact with the ground.

While flying at low altitude, the aircraft suddenly approached a wooded area. Unable to climb in time, the pilot attempted an emergency landing. During this maneuver, the wing must have struck the ground, according to farmers who witnessed the accident from a distance. They stated that the aircraft then made three large bounces, after which it exploded and crashed completely into ruins. The crash occurred at 9:45 local time in a wheat field owned by a local farmer, close to the main road from Wolvertem to Londerzeel.

Both occupants were killed instantly in the crash. The body of passenger Hepner, was located beneath the remains of the aircraft. The pilot lay in the churned-up ground with open scull.

The completely wrecked Jupiter engine and the front section lay twenty meters from the cabin. The single mailbag carried on board, the passenger's umbrella and hat were found undamaged.

== Cause ==
The accident was attributed to controlled flight into terrain due to dense fog and loss of situational awareness. According to the pilot's on the Antwerp–Brussels–Bordeaux air route, the visibility was so poor that at 50 meters above the ground, the ground was no longer visible. The pilot descended to maintain visual reference with the ground but was unable to avoid terrain at low altitude.

Reports indicated that no bad weather had been forecast for the Brussels area prior to departure. Another KLM aircraft on the same route did not encounter issues, although Sabena had temporarily suspended flights due to fog, suggesting the weather conditions were highly localized.

The localized nature of the fog and lack of prior weather warnings were considered contributing factors in the accident.

=== Experts' view ===
Fog was described as a persistent hazard in early aviation, responsible for multiple accidents involving controlled flight into terrain. Some public opinions suggested that the pilot should have remained above the fog layer. However, aviation expert Stephan Dert of the Fokker factory explained that this was not a practical solution. Flying in dense fog causes a pilot to lose all sense of orientation, and even if an aircraft remains above the fog temporarily, it must eventually descend, without knowing whether the fog extends to the ground, increasing the risk of collision with terrain.

The crash also highlighted the limitations of onboard instruments at the time. Although altimeters could indicate altitude, they were subject to mechanical lag and could give delayed readings during descent. This meant that a pilot relying on the instrument in fog could unknowingly fly dangerously close to the ground. As a result, standard practice was often to fly below cloud layers when possible, though this also carried risks in poor visibility.

Weather forecasting and reporting were identified as another key issue. At the time, meteorological information available to pilots was relatively basic and could not always account for sudden, highly localized weather phenomena such as the dense fog encountered near Wolvertem. It was suggested that improving meteorological services, despite the higher costs, would enhance both safety and reliability in air transport.

The absence of radio equipment on the H-NACC was also discussed. While some people argued that radio could have prevented the crash, the expert noted that many aircraft of the period were not yet equipped with radio systems, which were still in an experimental stage. Even where available, radio navigation (such as radiogoniometry) depended on limited ground infrastructure and would likely not have been effective in this specific situation, especially given the sudden onset of fog and the need to fly at low altitude.

== Aftermath ==
In the course of the afternoon after the crash, the public prosecutor's office from Brussels arrived at the scene for the customary investigation. The bodies of De Vree and Hepner were transferred to the mortuary of the municipality of Wolvertem.

The crash raised a (public) discussion about the dangers of flying in fog and the limitations of aviation technology. Future improvements in meteorology and navigation systems were suggested that would be essential for improving flight safety.

The registration of the aircraft was officially removed from the Netherlands aircraft register on 20 July 1926.

=== Wreckage ===
The wreckage was described as a shapeless mass of twisted metal, indicating the severity of the impact. An insurance assessment concluded that approximately 98 percent of the aircraft was lost, effectively rendering it a total write-off.

The aircraft was so severely damaged that no components remained intact or suitable for preservation. This was notable because the aircraft had historical significance, as the aircraft made the historic first flight to the Dutch East Indies.

As a result, KLM requested that the Belgian aviation authorities arrange for the disposal of the remains. This meant that no physical relics of the historically significant aircraft could be preserved or transported to the Dutch East Indies as a memorial to its earlier achievements.

=== Funerals ===
Pilot de Vree was buried on 13 July 1926 in Rijswijk, with significant public interest. At the funeral, several prominent figures were in attendance, including KLM director Albert Plesman and Head of Flight Operations Aler. Reverend Van den Bosch, who had officiated the marriage of de Vree and his wife three years earlier, speeched.

Passenger Hepner was cremated the same day at Westerveld crematorium in Velsen.
