= 1925 KLM Fokker F.III Forêt de Mormal crash =

1925 aviation accident in France

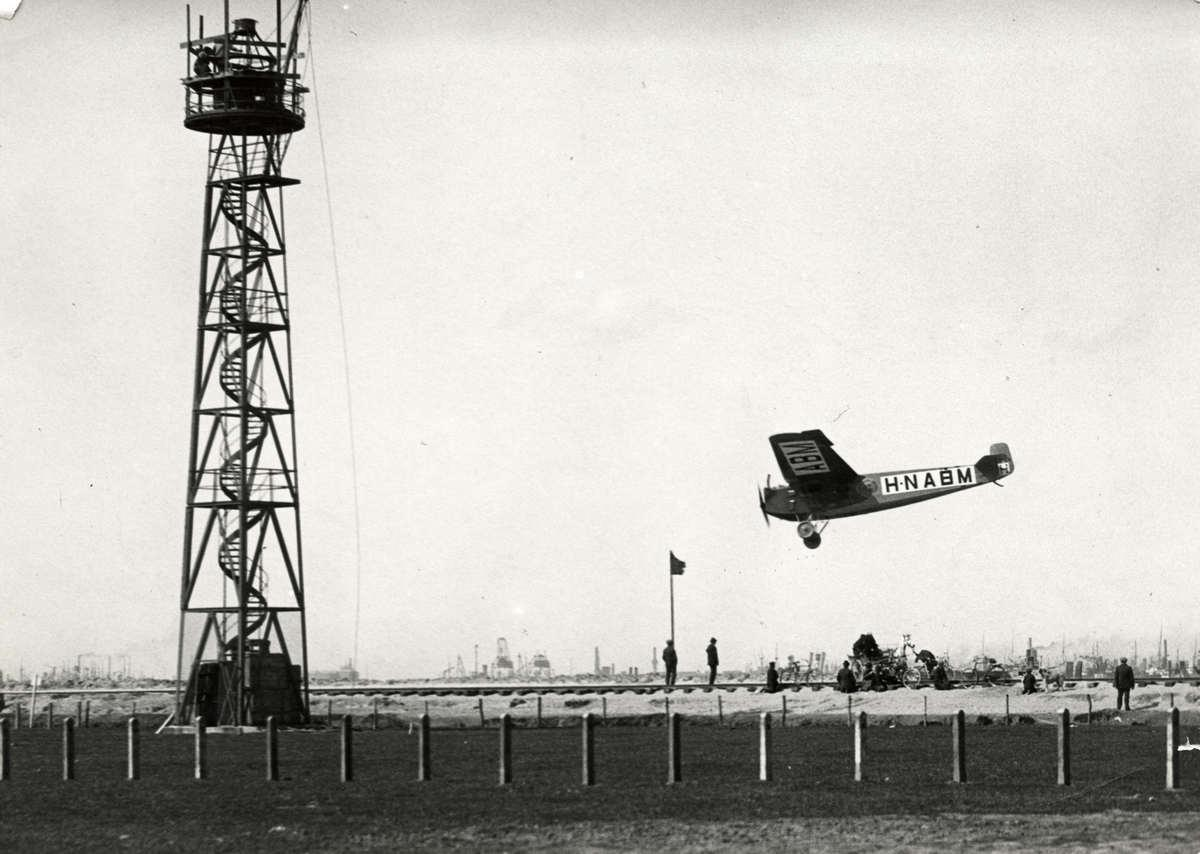
- H-NABM, the aircraft involved, seen in 1922

Accident
- Date: 25 June 1925
- Summary: CFIT in bad weather
- Site: Forêt de Mormal, France

Aircraft
- Aircraft type: Fokker F.III
- Operator: KLM
- Registration: H-NABM
- Flight origin: Schiphol Airport, the Netherlands
- 1st stopover: Rotterdam, the Netherlands
- Last stopover: Brussels, Belgium
- Destination: Le Bourget, Paris, France
- Passengers: 3
- Crew: 1
- Fatalities: 4
- Survivors: 0

On 25 June 1925, KLM-owned Fokker F.III H-NABM was a passenger flight from Schiphol Airport, the Netherlands to Paris, France. Due to bad weather, it struck trees in the Forêt de Mormal and crashed. The pilot and all three passengers were killed.

It was the second fatal KLM accident after the 1924 KLM Fokker F.III disappearance.

Due to the impact of the crash, there were expectations that there would be a decrease in airplane tickets; not only for KLM but in general. The crash caused a public discussion about airliner insurance.

The crash is one of the most important events in the history of the region Locquignol, and was memorized still 100 years after the crash.

== Background ==
The crash was in the very early era of international passenger flights, that started in August 1919. The involved airplane was among the biggest passengers airplanes of that era.

== Involved airplane ==
The involved airplane was a KLM owned Fokker F.III with registration H-. The airplane was built in 1924 by KLM from spare parts of other Fokker aircraft, including an earlier H-NABM (built by Fokker in Schwerin, Germany) that crashed near Croydon on 17 July 1923. It had a standard Armstrong Siddeley Puma engine of 240 hp. The aircraft had a cruising speed of 135 km/h, a maximum take-off weight of 1900 kg and a flight range of 1000 km. There was room for 5 passengers.

The plane was registered on 16 June 1922. But the plane had a richer history as it was built from the H-NABL after its last crash. The H-NABL had had two airplane crashes. The first was on 21 May 1921 in Hekelingen. The hull was used for building a new airplane that was registered on 30 August 1921 under the same registration H-NABL.

The aircraft had just before the crash been out of service and cleaned. It had been flown in on the Wednesday prior to the crash and had been approved.

== Flight and crash ==
On 24 April 1924 the Fokker F.III H-NABK started the twice daily KLM-operated international passenger flight from Schiphol Airport, the Netherlands via Waalhaven airport, Rotterdam, the Netherlands to Le Bourget, Paris, France. The plane departed at 9am (local time) from Schiphol Airport. At Waalhaven the H-NABK was replaced by the H-NABM. The plane departed from Waalhaven in time at 9:53 am (local time) with three passengers and 22kg of mail.

The weather forecast was good, so there was no need to cancel the flight or to fly via Brussels. However, near the Belgian-French border there was very bad weather. Due to the clouds, the pilot had to fly lower and lower to maintain visibility of the ground. The route to Paris in Northern France was along the Forêt de Mormal, a hilly area terrain with dense forests . During the passage, the pilot deviated slightly, around 6 kilometers. There the clouds hung very low, so low that higher parts that reaches 150 metres, of the forest were no longer visible. Witnesses later stated that judging the sound of the airplane, the plane was circling and they believed the pilot was trying to get a ground view. This assumption was later confirmed by experts during the investigation. The experts assumed that Klunder must have not been aware that he was flying so low over trees at a higher part of the forest. He made a sharp turn to the right suddenly after seeing trees. A wing hit trees and the aircraft turned over, turned upside down and flew into the forest at an angle of 30 to 40 degrees. The accident happened at 11:30 am (local time).

The trail of broken trees was approximately 40 meters long, the Siddeley Puma engine (no. 6898) had even snapped off a large tree. The airplane was completely destroyed and the four occupants must have been killed instantly. Debris was spread over 100 square meters. Lumberjacks who saw the airplane above the forest and shortly after in a sudden dive, started searching for the aircraft. The wreck was found at 3pm (local time). Later, forest rangers and police arrived at the disaster site. The bodies of the occupants were much mutilated and taken out of the airplane or found among the debris.

== Aftermath ==
The mayor of Locguignol, who was also a doctor, confirmed the death of the occupants at the crash site. The bodies were transported to the hospital in Léquenoy. The police of Le Quesnoy handled all matters of the accident. Groeneveld Meyer, representative of KLM and Van Ewijk of the Government Study Service went to the crash site. The mail and other belongings out of the airplane was confiscated by the Avesnes public prosecutor's office.

The plane was completely destroyed and no parts of the wreckage were valuable enough to be transported back to the Netherlands. Only some parts of the wing were cut out for the investigation by the RSL (Rijksluchtvaartdienst).

There were fears of a general decline in airline ticket sales. On June 28 it was reported that this was not (yet) the case.

The accident led to discussion about high aviation insurance costs, as there was only one airline in the Netherlands.

== Investigations ==
A statement from Albert Plesman regarding to the accident was published in July 1925.

French aviation was asked to lead the investigation into the accident and a Direction des Services de la navigation aérienne was formed. Their report was finalized in the second half of July 1925.

The Rijksluchtvaartdienst (“Rijksstudiedienst voor de Luchtvaart” at the time) led by ir. Van Ewijk also made a report about the accident. The KLM also made report by dr. Groeneveld Meyer and ir. Behagen.

== Crash site location ==
In most sources the location of the crash site is listed incorrectly. Landrecies, a town 30 kilometres away is often mentioned as the crash location. However, after investigation by amateur aviation historian Herman Dekker in 2006 including conversations with the local authorities, it turned out that the entire Forêt de Mormal, including the crash site, is located in the municipality of Locquignol.

== Pilot and passengers ==
There were four people on board: the pilot and three passengers.

- H. Klunder (born 16 March 1893 in Rotterdam), the pilot. Klunder came from the “Luchtvaart Afdeling” (LVA) of Soesterberg. On 22 June 1925 had fulfilled the six-month examination and was approved. He was cremated at Westerveld cemetery.
- Jhr. L.P.A. van Brandeler (born 28 March 1888 in The Hague) lived in Domburg. He was an official of the Public Prosecution Service in Zeeland.
- .T.J. Labouchère. He lived in Vogelzang. He was director of an export company in The Hague. He was destined to succeed his father as director of De Porceleyne Fles in Delft. He was buried at Westerveld cemetery.
- Henri Groginsky. He lived in Brooklyn, the United States
