= Rhonelle =

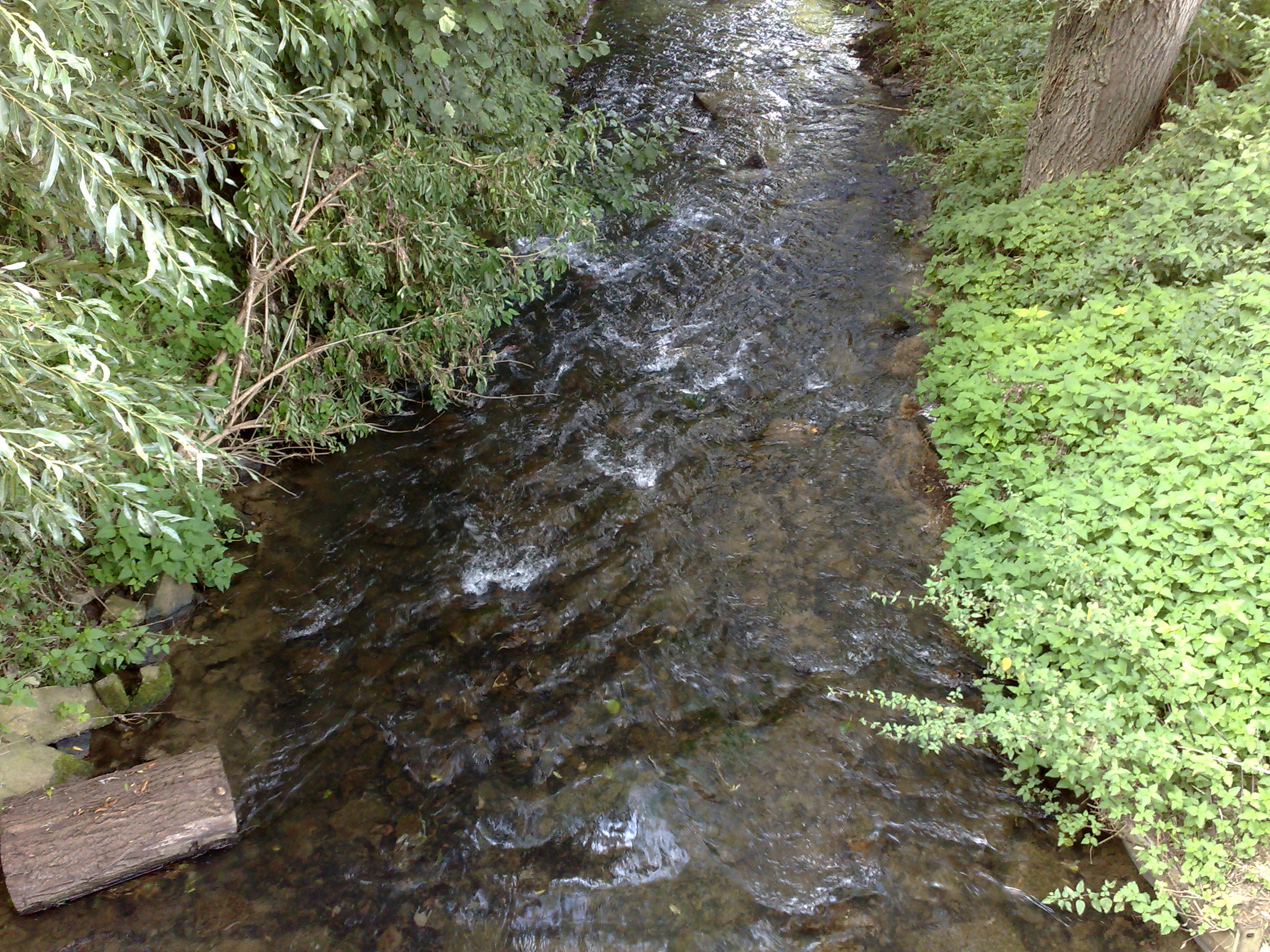
- The Rhonelle at Famars

- Location within France Location within Hauts-de-France

Location
- Country: France

Physical characteristics
- Source
  - location: France
- Mouth
  - location: Scheldt
  - coordinates: 50°21′39″N 3°30′53″E
- Length: 32 km (20 mi)

Basin features
- Progression: Scheldt→ North Sea

The Rhonelle is a river of northern France. It is 32 km (20 mi) long. It is a right tributary of the Scheldt. Its source is near Locquignol. It flows generally northwest along Le Quesnoy, Villers-Pol and Famars. It flows into the Scheldt in Valenciennes.
