= 1928 KLM Fokker F.III Waalhaven crash =

1928 Dutch aviation accident

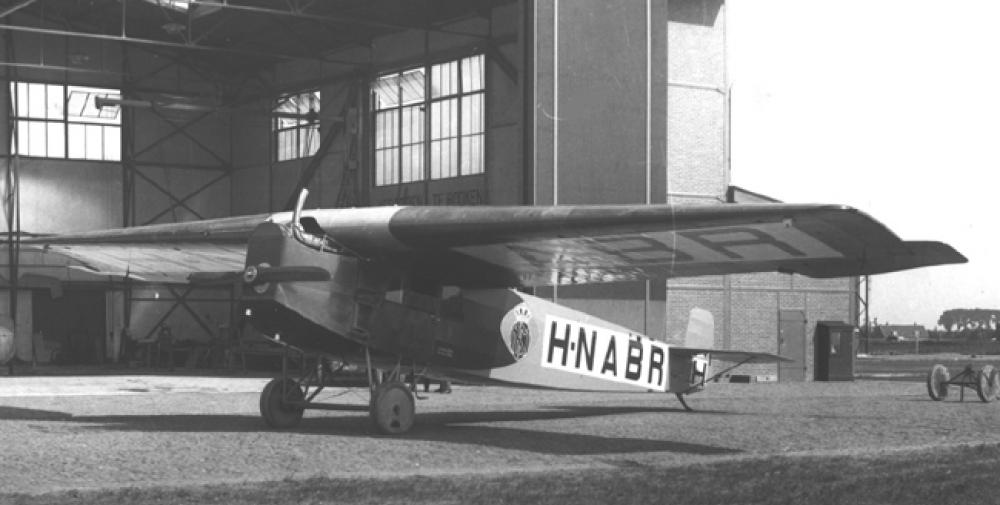
- H-NABR, the Fokker F.III involved in the accident.

Accident
- Date: 24 July 1928
- Summary: Stalled shortly after takeoff
- Site: Waalhaven, Rotterdam, Netherlands

Aircraft
- Aircraft type: Fokker F.III
- Operator: KLM Royal Dutch Airlines
- Registration: H-NABR
- Flight origin: Waalhaven Airport, Rotterdam, Netherlands
- Destination: Waalhaven Airport, Rotterdam, Netherlands
- Occupants: 6
- Passengers: 5
- Crew: 1
- Fatalities: 1
- Survivors: 5

On 24 July 1928, a KLM-owned Fokker F.III operated a scheduled passenger sightseeing flight from and back to Waalhaven Airport in Rotterdam, Netherlands. The plane with the pilot and five passengers on board stalled shortly after takeoff and crashed after its landing gear and the right wing struck struck boats in the Waalhaven harbour next to the airport. One passenger died after not all passengers could be saved in time while the airplane sank.

The pilot wasn’t properly trained for this older type of aircraft. The passengers weren’t aware of the emergency hatch, and all could have survived had they used this emergency exit. It was suggested to tell passengers before the flight where the emergency exit is located, which is nowadays one of the mandatory parts of the pre-flight safety demonstration. Better visibility inside the cabin of the emergency exit was also advised. The accident also resulted in better procedures by which pilots are assigned to fly certain aircraft types.

== Aircraft ==
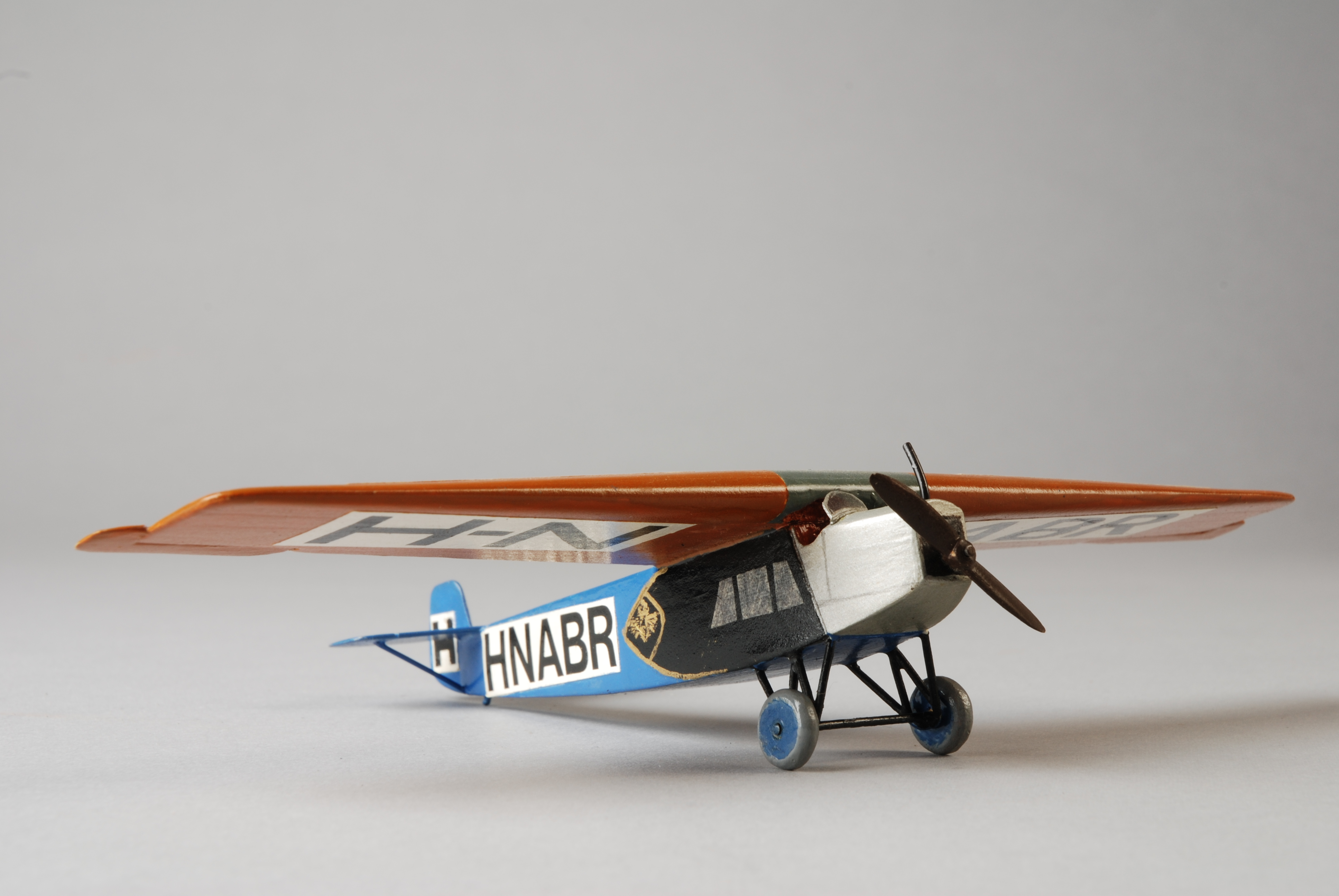
Model of the aircraft involved

The involved airplane was a KLM-owned Fokker F.III with registration H-NABR and registration number 1533. The plane had an Armstrong Siddeley Puma engine of 240 hp. The aircraft had a cruising speed of 135 km/h (84 mph), a maximum take-off weight of 1,900 kg (4,200 lb), and a flight range of 1,000 km (620 mi). There was room for five passengers. In this type of aircraft, the pilot sat right next to the engine in the open air.

The aircraft was registered on 16 June 1922. But the accident aircraft had a longer history, as it was built from the wreckage of H-NABL after its last crash. The aircraft had had two accidents. The first was on 21 May 1921, in Hekelingen. The hull was used for building a new airplane that was registered on 30 August 1921, under the same registration as H-NABL.

On 29 October 1921, pilot R. Hofstra of the H-NABL found himself lost and had to make a forced landing during the night in the darkness at Waalhaven Airport. The plane flipped over due to poor lighting and was moderately damaged. The accident aircraft was built from the wreckage of H-NABL.

On 9 July 1924, the H-NABR was the first KLM aircraft to transport livestock. As there was foot and mouth disease in Belgium at the time, the breeding bull “Nico II” was transported by air from Waalhaven Airport to Paris.

== Accident ==
In July 1928, the Rotterdamsche Aero Club organized, together with KLM, a three-day aviation festival at Waalhaven Airport. The KLM organized round-trip flights.

On 24 July 1928, the Fokker F.III registered H-NABR was used as a sightseeing flight above Rotterdam from Waalhaven Airport, the Netherlands. Besides the pilot, Scott, there were five female passengers on board. After the usual test of the engine, the plane departed at 2:48 p.m. local time in a westerly direction. After 150 meters in the air, the airplane flew in an abnormal position with a low-hanging tail. Due to a sudden wind, the airplane drifted to the right. The airplane flew just over the fence of the airport. Due to the stalled position of the aircraft, the main landing gear and the right wing struck boats at the Waalhaven harbor. The front three masts of the Kolenmijn were hit. The first mast snapped off, the second mast lost the top part, and the third mast damaged the wing. The plane glided seventy-five meters further away into the water of the harbor. As the depth of the water was only four meters, the hull and left wing were at an angle above the water, and the right-wing was at the bottom of the water.

== Rescue operation ==
Rowing boats from surrounding ships went to the wreck to help. The pilot and four passengers were released shortly after. The position of the airplane changed all the time as the rescue was ongoing. After most of the passengers were released, the cabin was almost entirely underwater. The two oldest passengers were the last two people in the airplane and were seriously injured. Pieter Guilonard, KLM’s chief of technical services, jumped in the water, kicked in the emergency exit, and ripped open the linen of the hull. Twenty minutes after the crash, he managed to release the unconscious fifth passenger through the exit (some sources stated it was Madam Kappeyne who was saved last). After long mouth-to-mouth resuscitation, she was declared dead.

With the help of Driessen, an engineer from KLM, the aircraft was pulled out of the water by De Tweeling and placed on the deck of the ship. The river police seized the aircraft, which was later handed over to KLM.

== Occupants ==
There were six people on board: the pilot and five female passengers.

- J.J. Schott, an experienced KLM pilot on Fokker F.VII and Fokker F.VIIa airplanes. He had a head injury.
- A. ten Cate-De Lorraine Holting (53 years old), a married woman from Deventer. She didn’t survive the accident.
- B.H. ten Cate (19 years old), the daughter of A. ten Cate-De Lorraine Holting, also from Deventer. She had head injuries.
- C.F.E.G. Kappeyne (67 years old) from The Hague. She had a broken leg. Madam Ten Cate and her daughter had stayed with her.
- G.N. Giphart (29 years old) worked as a nurse at the Coolsingel hospital.
- C.E.G.E. Dolfing (33 years old) worked as a nurse at the Coolsingel hospital.

== Reactions and investigation ==
The passengers hadn’t known the location of the emergency hatch in the ceiling of the aircraft. It was stated that all could have survived if they had used the emergency exit, as the exit was above the water for a long time. It was suggested that passengers should be told before a flight where the emergency exit is located.

As KLM had high safety standards, the airline was criticized in the media for using its older airplanes for passenger flights.

=== Conclusions ===
In November 1928, the investigative committee published their conclusions:

- The aircraft stalled shortly after taking off due to a sudden wind gust that made the aircraft bank towards the north side of the airfield.
- The Fokker F.III required a well-trained pilot as it was difficult to fly under the said conditions.
- Schott, who was a very experienced pilot, was trained for the more modern Fokker F.VII and Fokker F.VIIa airplanes. The Fokker F.III, normally flown by experienced F.III pilots, was used because there were no other aircraft available. Schott only had a brief training session for this type of aircraft. The airport master, Aler, was blamed for sending Schott in this type of aircraft.
- There would have been no fatalities had the emergency hatch been used.

Their recommendation was to establish better procedures under which pilots are assigned to fly certain types of aircraft. Another recommendation was better visibility of the emergency exit.
