= Deruluft =

Joint German-Soviet airline (1921–1937)

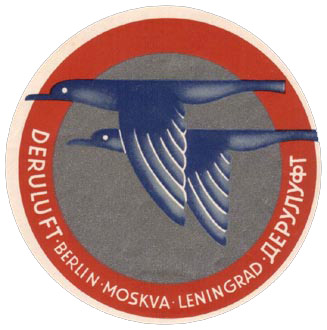
- Founded: 24 November 1921; 104 years ago
- Commenced operations: 1 May 1922; 104 years ago
- Ceased operations: 31 March 1937; 89 years ago

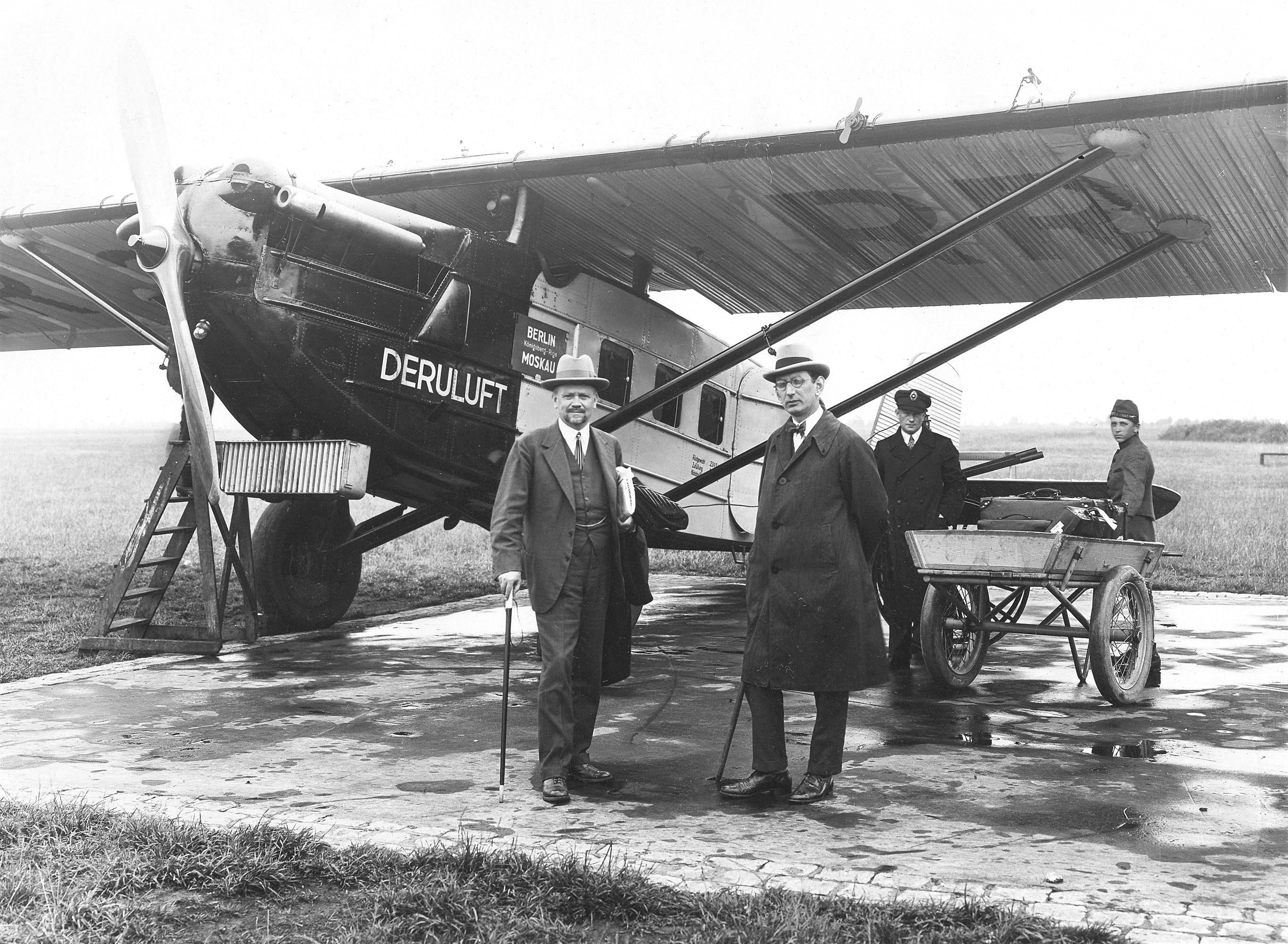
A Deruluft Dornier Merkur at the opening of Stettin Airstrip 1927. Second from left, Stockholm Municipal commissioner Yngve Larsson.

Deruluft (Deutsch-Russische Luftverkehrs A.G., or Deruluft) was a joint German-Soviet airline, established on 11 November 1921. Deruluft opened its first permanent airlink between Moscow and Königsberg (via Kaunas and Smolensk) on 1 May 1922. It started a new route between Berlin and Leningrad (via Tallinn) on 6 June 1928, and maintained both routes until 31 March 1936. Deruluft was a successful business, but terminated on 31 March 1937 due to the changed political situation.

== Business ==
Deruluft handled mainly post and freight. An overview of transported persons, mail and freight from 1922 to 1931:

Year	Flown distance	Persons	Freight	Mail
1922	174.768 km	338	17,915 t	1.047 kg
1923	215.480 km	382	23,487 t	1.589 kg
1924	352.786 km	552	34,519 t	2.382 kg
1925	492.237 km	1.463	54,059 t	5.410 kg
1926	514.185 km	1.192	25,892 t	10.733 kg
1927	630.542 km	1.809	49,694 t	25.574 kg
1928	790.465 km	2.510	69,886 t	27.992 kg
1929	839.655 km	2.692	75,238 t	16.711 kg
1930	950.512 km	2.947	62,351 t	27.244 kg
1931	945.317 km	3.660	87,690 t	29.060 kg

== Fleet ==
Most of the aircraft used were German, and so was its organization until the 1930s. Its first aircraft were Dutch-built Fokker F.III's. Later German Junkers F13's were added to the fleet. At first, Deruluft carried only mail and officials, but on 27 August 1922 the service was opened to the public. From 1929 onwards the early Fokker F.III's were replaced by Dornier Merkurs. Early 1931 the Tupolev ANT-9 was added.

- Albatros L 58
- Dornier Merkur
- Fokker F.II
- Fokker F.III
- Junkers F.13
- Junkers Ju 52
- Rohrbach Roland
- Tupolev ANT-9

== Accidents and incidents ==
- In October 1924, LVG C.VI RR-14 crashed in Russia.
- In December 1926, Grulich V.1 D-902 crashed in Russia.
- In June 1927, Fokker F.III RR-7 crashed in Russia.
- On May 16, 1928, Fokker F.III D-200 crashed shortly after takeoff from Tempelhof Airport due to engine failure; the pilot survived. THe aircraft was operating a cargo flight to Cologne.
- On 15 October 1929, Junkers F.13 URSS-308 Koenigsadler crashed in Estonia and broke in two; no casualties.
- In 1933, Dornier Merkur CCCP-D306 crashed in Russia.
- On 22 October 1934, Tupolev ANT-9 D-2831 struck trees and crashed while on approach to Moscow Airport in poor weather; all three on board survived.
- On 31 January 1935, Junkers Ju 52/3mge D-AREN struck a hillside in poor weather near Stettin, Germany (now Szczecin, Poland) due to icing, killing all 11 on board.
- On 7 March 1935, Rohrbach Ro VIII Roland II D-AJYP Schönberg crashed at Schievelbein, Germany (now Świdwin, Poland) due to structural failure; all three on board survived.
- On 16 May 1936, Junkers J.13FLE D-OKES crashed in Russia.
- On 6 November 1936, Tupolev ANT-9 URSS-D311 Yastreb struck trees and crashed upside-down near Nemirovo, Volokolamsky District (27 km (17 mi) southwest of Volokolamsk) after several navaids failed, killing all nine on board. The aircraft was operating the Velikiye Luki–Moscow leg of a Königsberg (now Kaliningrad)–Moscow passenger service.

== Bibliography ==
- Cooksley, Peter (September–October 1996). "Celestial Coaches: Dornier's Record Breaking Komet and Merkur". Air Enthusiast (65): 20–24. ISSN 0143-5450.
- Davies, R.E.G. Aeroflot: An Illustrated History of the World's Largest Airline, 1992.
