= Tupolev ANT-9 =

Soviet passenger aircraft, introduced 1931

ANT-9
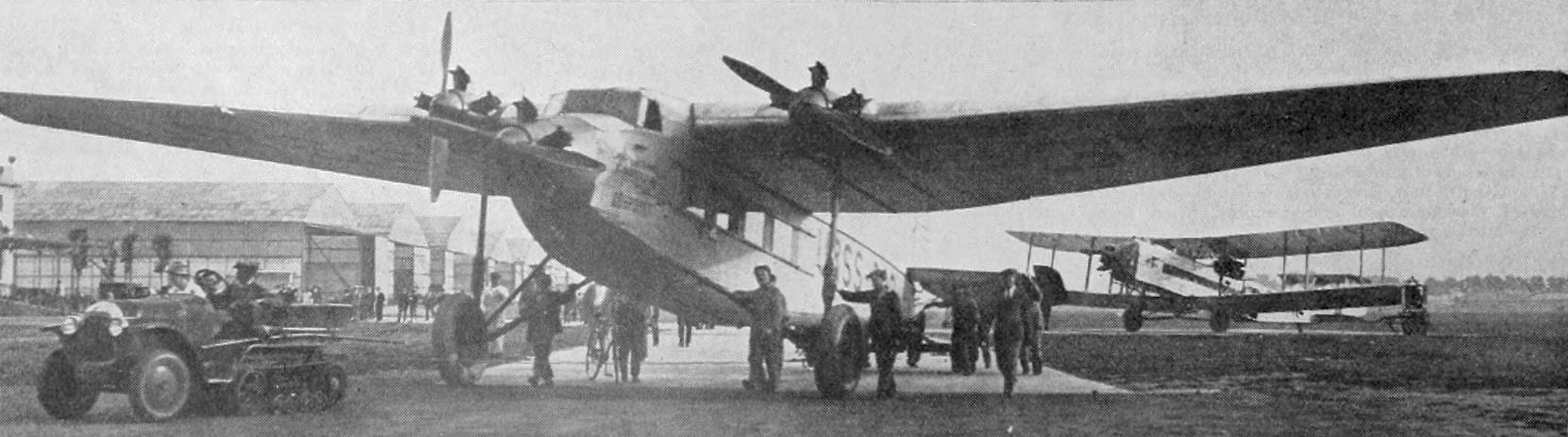
- Early production ANT-9 with three engines

General information
- Type: Airliner
- National origin: Soviet Union
- Manufacturer: Tupolev
- Primary user: Aeroflot
- Number built: ~100

History
- Introduction date: 1931
- First flight: 5 May 1929
- Retired: 1945
- Developed into: Tupolev ANT-14

The Tupolev ANT-9 (Russian: Туполев АНТ-9) was a Soviet passenger aircraft of the 1930s. It was developed as a reaction to the demand for a domestic airliner. At this time Deruluft, one of the forerunners of Aeroflot, flew only with foreign models, which were mainly German or Dutch.

Design work began in December 1927. The first prototype, named Krylia Sovietov (Wings of the Soviets) used three French Gnome-Rhone Titan radial engines. It was presented to the public on 1 May 1929 at Red Square and it went to the national flight testing, which was completed in June. In the first series 12 aircraft were built. In production, the Titan engines were replaced with M-26 engines, but these proved too unreliable and were replaced with imported Wright Whirlwind engines. Two of these airplanes were used by Deruluft, starting from 1933 on the Berlin-Moscow service. Mikhail Gromov accomplished a European round flight on the route Moscow – Travemünde – Berlin – Paris – Rome – Marseille – London – Paris – Berlin – Warsaw – Moscow with the Krylia Sovietov, which lasted from 10 July to 8 August 1929 and generated considerable publicity. It carried eight passengers over a distance of 9,037 km (5,615 mi), in 53 flying hours with an average speed of 177 km/h (110 mph).

In September 1930, testing of the Wright-powered version of the ANT-9 was completed. A few were used as executive transports for the Soviet Air Forces. A military variant with standard and retractable turrets was under construction, but was abandoned before trials began. An ambulance version was studied and considered, but never built. In 1932, GVF engineer Sergei Ivanovich Komarov proposed a modification of the ANT-9 wing to accommodate two M-17 engines, similar to what was done on the R-6. Production began in 1933 as the PS-9 (ПС-9 (Note: пассажирский самолёт, passazhirskiy samolyot, 'passenger airplane')) and about 70 machines were built. Up to the beginning of the German invasion of the Soviet Union, they served as passenger or staff airplanes mainly on routes in Central Asia and the Caucasus. Afterwards they were used until 1943 as transport and medical airplanes. One PS-9 was modified into a propaganda aircraft named Krokodil (Crocodile) with a reptile-like plywood nose.

== Operators ==
=== Military operators ===
Soviet Union

- Soviet Air Force

Turkey

- Turkish Air Force

=== Civil operators ===
Soviet Union

- Aeroflot
- Deruluft

Turkey

- Turkish Airlines

== Accidents and incidents ==
- On December 6, 1936, a Deruluft ANT-9, registration CCCP-D311, crashed near Moscow due to pilot error, killing nine of 14 on board.

== Specifications (PS-9) ==
Data from The Osprey Encyclopedia of Russian Aircraft 1875–1995

General characteristics

- Crew: 2
- Capacity: 9 passengers
- Length: 17.01 m (55 ft 10 in)
- Wingspan: 23.85 m (78 ft 3 in)
- Height: 5 m (16 ft 5 in)
- Wing area: 84 m^{2} (900 sq ft)
- Airfoil: root: Tupolev A0 (20%); tip: Tupolev A0 (14%)
- Empty weight: 4,400 kg (9,700 lb)
- Gross weight: 6,200 kg (13,669 lb)
- Powerplant: 2 × Mikulin M-17 V-12 water-cooled piston engines, 373 kW (500 hp) each

alternate engines:3x Bristol Titan, 3x Wright J-5 Whirlwind or 3x M-26

- Propellers: 2-bladed fixed-pitch propellers

Performance

- Maximum speed: 215 km/h (134 mph, 116 kn)
- Cruise speed: 180 km/h (110 mph, 97 kn)
- Range: 700 km (430 mi, 380 nmi)
- Service ceiling: 5,100 m (16,700 ft)
- Rate of climb: 2.8 m/s (550 ft/min)
- Power/mass: 0.12 kW/kg (0.073 hp/lb)

== See also ==
- Andrei Tupolev
- Tupolev
