= Arboretum de l'Étang David =

Arboretum in Hauts-de-France, France

Coordinates: 50.1671°N 3.7045°E

The Arboretum de l'Étang David (10 hectares), also known as the Arboretum de Preux au Bois and the Arboretum de la Forêt de Mormal, is an arboretum located in the Forêt Domaniale de Mormal on the Route forestière du Pont-Routier southwest of Locquignol, Nord, Hauts-de-France, France. It was established in 1968 and currently contains about 60 species of trees.

== See also ==
- List of botanical gardens in France
