= Tupolev ANT-14 =

Soviet aircraft

ANT-14
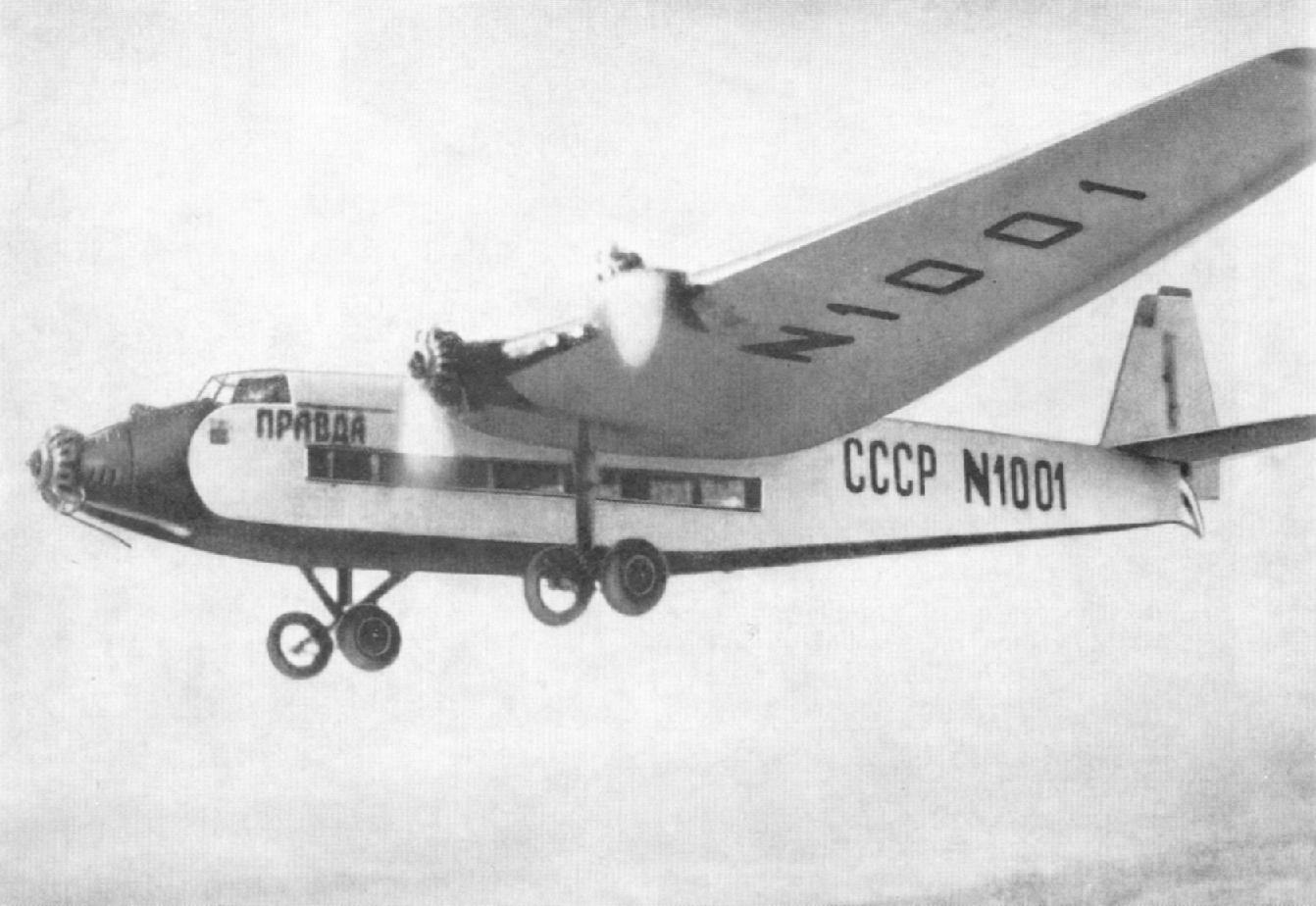

General information
- Type: Passenger transport / propaganda aircraft
- National origin: Soviet Union
- Manufacturer: Tupolev
- Designer: A.N.Tupolev
- Status: Retired
- Primary user: Maxim Gorky propaganda squadron
- Number built: 1

History
- Introduction date: 1931
- First flight: 14 August 1931
- Retired: 1941
- Developed from: Tupolev ANT-9

The Tupolev ANT-14 Pravda was a Soviet aircraft, which served as the flagship of the Soviet propaganda squadron. It has been credited as Russia's first all-metal aircraft, with a corrosion-resistant-steel structure.

The ANT-14 was a larger version of the ANT-9, with a 40.4 m wingspan, compared to the 23.8 m span of the ANT-9. Powered by five 358 kW (480 hp) Gnome-Rhône Jupiter 9AKX radial engines, it was capable of carrying a crew of three, as well as 36 passengers, at a maximum speed of 236 km/h (147 mph). However, its cruise speed was only 195 km/h (121 mph). Empty weight was 10,650 kg (23,480 lb) and the maximum takeoff weight was 17,146 kg (37,800 lb). The ANT-14 had a range of 900 km (559 mi), and an operational ceiling of 4,220 m (13,845 ft). It had a non-retractable tailwheel undercarriage whose main gear consisted of dual (fore-aft) wheels.

== Operational history ==
The ANT-14 was tested by Aeroflot in 1932. While these tests revealed no problems with the aircraft, it was far larger than any other aircraft in its fleet, and it had no requirement for an aircraft with a 36-passenger capacity, so no production followed.

On 17 March 1933, the Soviet Union set up an aerial propaganda squadron, named after Maxim Gorky, and the ANT-14 was assigned to it as its flagship, being named Pravda (Truth) after the Soviet newspaper and was used mainly for sightseeing flights over Moscow, but did carry out occasional tourist flights to Kharkov and Leningrad (now Saint Petersburg), while it visited Bucharest in 1935 to help celebrate a festival being held there at the time. The ANT-14 carried over 40,000 passengers before being grounded in 1941.

== Operators ==
Soviet Union

== Specifications ==
Data from Illustrated Encyclopedia of Propeller Airliners, Tupolev aircraft since 1922

General characteristics

- Crew: 3
- Capacity: 36 passengers
- Length: 26.485 m (86 ft 11 in)
- Wingspan: 40.4 m (132 ft 7 in)
- Height: 5.4 m (17 ft 9 in)
- Wing area: 240 m^{2} (2,600 sq ft)
- Airfoil: root: Tupolev A0 (20%); tip: Tupolev A0 (10%)
- Empty weight: 10,828 kg (23,872 lb)
- Gross weight: 17,530 kg (38,647 lb)
- Powerplant: 5 × Gnome-Rhône 9Akx Jupiter 9-cylinder air-cooled radial piston engines, 358 kW (480 hp) each
- Propellers: 2-bladed fixed-pitch wooden propellers, 3.2 m (10 ft 6 in) diameter later metal propellers

Performance

- Maximum speed: 236 km/h (147 mph, 127 kn) at sea level

195 km/h (121 mph; 105 kn) at 3,000 m (9,800 ft)

- Cruise speed: 175 km/h (109 mph, 94 kn)
- Range: 900 km (560 mi, 490 nmi)
- Service ceiling: 4,220 m (13,850 ft)
- Time to altitude: 1,000 m (3,300 ft) in 4 minutes 54 seconds
- Wing loading: 3,000 kg/m^{2} (610 lb/sq ft)
- Take-off run: 250 m (820 ft)
- Landing run: 220 m (720 ft)

== See also ==
Related development

- Tupolev ANT-9

Related lists

- List of civil aircraft
