= 1924 KLM Fokker F.III disappearance =

1924 airplane disappearance

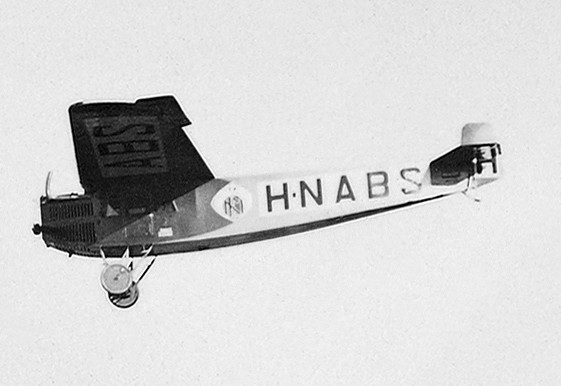
- H-NABS, the Fokker F.III involved in the accident.

Accident
- Date: 24 April 1924
- Summary: Unexplained disappearance
- Site: English Channel

Aircraft
- Aircraft type: Fokker F.III
- Operator: KLM
- Registration: H-NABS
- Flight origin: Croydon Airport, United Kingdom
- Destination: Waalhaven, the Netherlands
- Occupants: 3
- Passengers: 2
- Crew: 1
- Fatalities: 3
- Survivors: 0

On 24 April 1924, KLM Royal Dutch Airlines (KLM) operated the Fokker F.III H-NABS on an international passenger flight from Croydon Airport in the United Kingdom to Waalhaven, the Netherlands. The plane, its pilot, and the two passengers on board disappeared while flying over the English Channel. Despite a large search operation, the plane was not found, and is presumed to have crashed into the Channel.

The plane's disappearance was the first major accident for KLM, founded four years earlier, and is described in many historical overviews of the flag carrier airline.

== Background ==
KLM began operations on 7 October 1919, one of the first commercial airline companies in the world. KLM had rigorous safety measures for the time and a strict policy for the selection of pilots. At the time of H-NABS' disappearance, KLM aircraft had successfully completed 2,734 flights over the North Sea between Rotterdam and Croydon, 3,000 flights between Belgium and the United Kingdom, and 7,000 flights between Croydon and Paris.

== Flight ==
On 24 April 1924, H-NABS departed at 10:43 from Croydon Airport with three people on board, the pilot Adriaan P.J. Pijl and two passengers, W. J. van Hien and C. J. M. Modderman. Foggy conditions forced a stopover at Lympne Airport in Kent. The aircraft departed from Lympne at 13:34, headed for its final destination, Waalhaven Airport in Rotterdam. H-NABS was not equipped with a radio set, so H. Nieuwenhuis, the official in charge at Waalhaven, was alerted only after the aircraft failed to arrive on time.

== Pilot and passengers ==
- The pilot was Adriaan Pieter Johannes Pijl (born 22 November 1895 in Amersfoort). As a military aviator he had flown 750 hours before he started working at KLM on 1 April 1922. As a KLM pilot he had logged 1,220 additional flight-hours, and had flown over the English Channel 215 times. Pijl was described as a very good, calm pilot with a lot of aviation knowledge.
- Passenger W. J. van Hien was the son of W. H. J. van Hien, who worked as acting director at the time of Dutch state taxes in Amsterdam. He was married and lived in Folkestone (and not in Amsterdam indicated by some sources). Van Hien was en route to Amsterdam for business.
- Passenger C. J. M. Modderman, approximately 40 years old, was an engineer, working on architecture and lived in Amersfoort. He'd previously travelled to London multiple times on business and it wasn’t his first trip by airplane. Modderman had originally planned to return after this business trip to the UK by boat. He was married and had one child.

== Search operation ==
After the plane failed to arrive, KLM made extensive efforts to find the plane in the days after the disappearance, enlisting all of the aviation centers along the Belgian coast, the north of France and the southeast coast of the United Kingdom via radio. Telephone and telegraph services were used in attempt to gain more information about the plane and its whereabouts. The head of the Dutch radio service, J. Strijkers, worked all night, gathering information. English Channel patrol boats, lightships and coastguards were asked to look out for the airplane.

During the night an organization was formed to conduct the search operation. After sunrise three Dutch seaplanes of the Netherlands Naval Aviation Service stationed at De Kooy Airfield, a Dutch torpedo boat, three seaplanes of the Royal Air Force and KLM airplanes N-NABJ and H-NABX searched the English Channel and the Dutch coast. Nieuwenhuis searched together with a photographer using the plane that was normally used for making photographs. Several sandbanks had run dry due to low water, but the aircraft, or parts of it, were not found. In the afternoon French aircraft too, searched along the French coast. Four airplanes (F-ADBI, F-GEAB, F-AECU en F-AEFC) on scheduled flights searched the flight path as well.

The next day seaplanes of the Dutch Royal Air Force went out again to search for the plane. Dutch seaplanes stationed in Veere searched but without a sign of the plane. At the end of the search that day all hope was given up that the aircraft would be found.

On 26 April a telegram was received that a Dutch plane was found at a sandbank of Goodwin and a British plane saw oil in that area. However, the message turned out to be incorrect. KLM director Plesman was publicly praised by the media for the extensive search. The efforts of H. Nieuwenhuis and J. Strijkers were also praised.

== Reactions ==
The accident sparked discussion around the safety of air travel. Since KLM had never had such an accident, it was feared that it would set back air transport in general.

== Cause ==
The investigative committee stated, as the only possible explanation, that the pilot must have hit the water flying at full speed under the fog. This may be confirmed by a witness who saw the plane coming over at Sandgate, where the visibility was good, but due to the fog over the sea the horizon wasn't visible.

== Measures ==
According to experts, the plane wouldn't have crashed if the plane had a radio communication system on board, as it could have been used to fly above the fog. After the accident, all KLM airplanes got a radio communication system. Having a radio communication system on board was made compulsory from 1 October 1924 after the International aviation conference.
