= Fokker F.III =

Single-engined high-winged monoplane aircraft

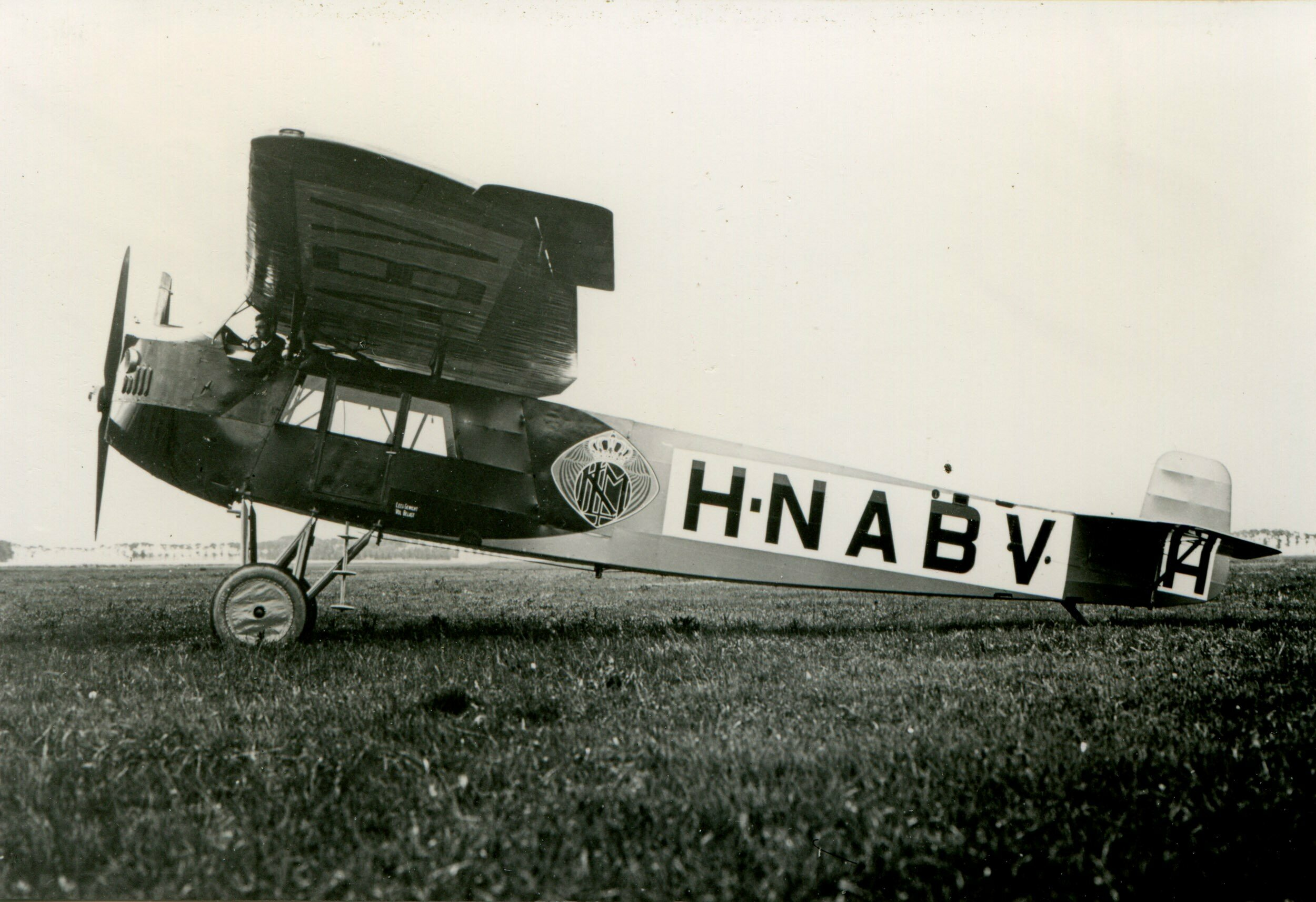
- Fokker F.III operated by KLM

General information
- Type: Passenger transport
- Manufacturer: Fokker
- Designer: Reinhold Platz
- Primary users: Deutsche Aero Lloyd KLM
- Number built: c.66

History
- First flight: April 1921

The Fokker F.III was a single-engined high-winged monoplane aircraft produced in the 1920s by the Dutch aircraft manufacturer Fokker. It could carry five passengers. The aircraft was also built under licence in Germany as the Fokker-Grulich F.III.

The design was quite popular when it was shown at the 1921 Paris Air Show, and it proved to be a successful early airliner. Although quickly surpassed by later designs in the 1920s, it was used on many early air routes in Europe. It was also involved in KLM's first air accident, which led to radio being required on aircraft.

== Design and development ==
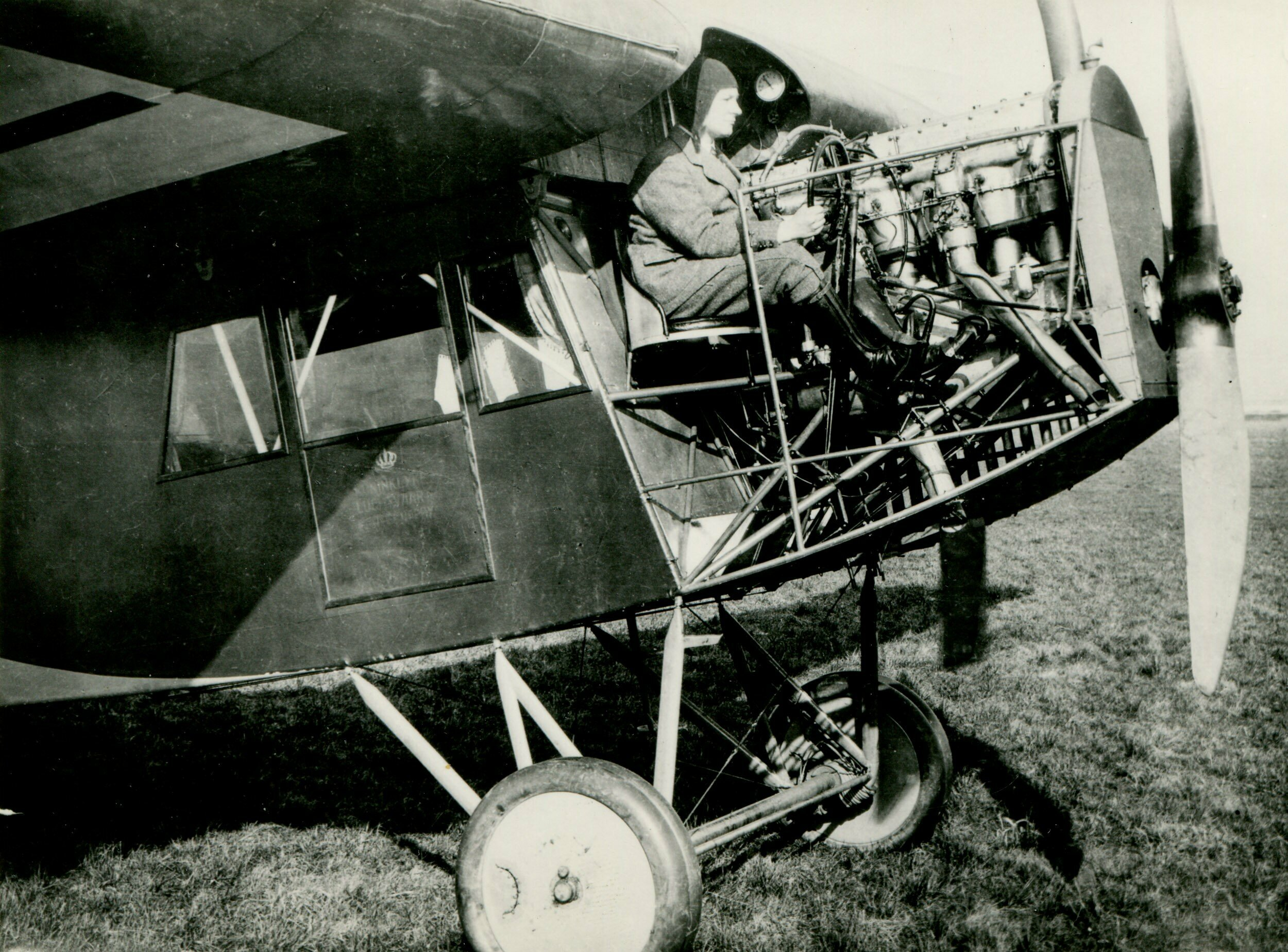
Anthony Fokker behind the controls of the F.III; the engine cowling has been removed.

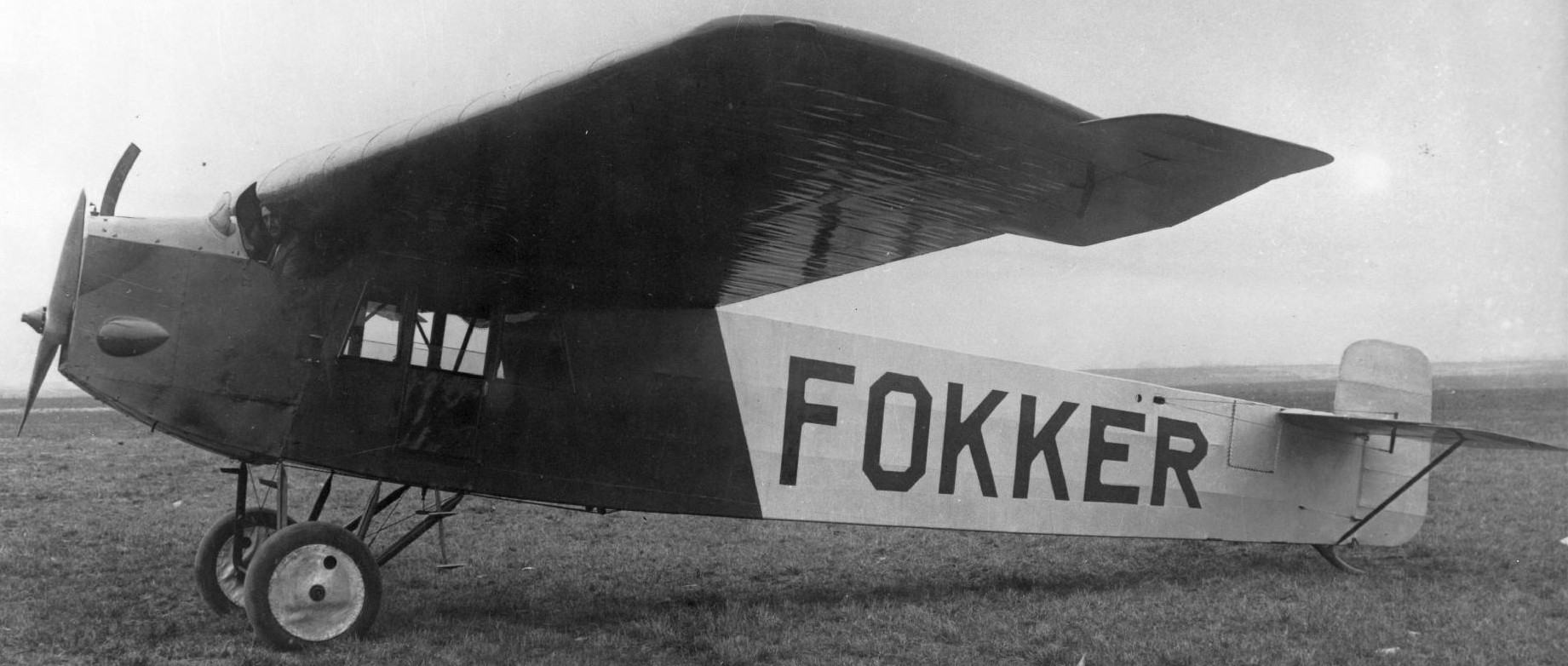
Fokker F.III

The Fokker F.III was a straightforward development of the F.II. A widened cabin allowed all five passengers to sit within; in the earlier aircraft, one passenger sat alongside the pilot in his exposed cockpit. The pilot now sat alongside the engine, which was offset laterally by about 100 mm (3.9 in); whether to port or starboard depended on the type of engine installed. Although this unusual arrangement meant that pilots were "burned on one side and frozen on the other," they had a much better view than from the F.II. The view was further improved by a cut-out in the wing leading edge for the pilot's head, allowing his seat to be raised. The external wing struts of the F.II were removed, leaving a clean cantilever wing. The trapezoidal windows seen in the Grulich built F.IIs were standard on the F.III.

Like its predecessor, the F.III was initially powered by a readily available, war surplus 138 kW (185 hp) BMW IIIa engine, but once again KLM re-engined theirs with the 172 kW (230 hp) Armstrong Siddeley Puma.

A seaplane version was developed by Fokker, called the F.IIIw. However, this design did not go into production. The design had twin floats, and it had a longer fuselage and rudder. Such was the pace of aircraft development no blueprints are known, only several photographs.

An improved model known as the F.IIIs was also made, and this had new fuselage and tail fin. It was also called the Grulich V.I.

== Operational history ==
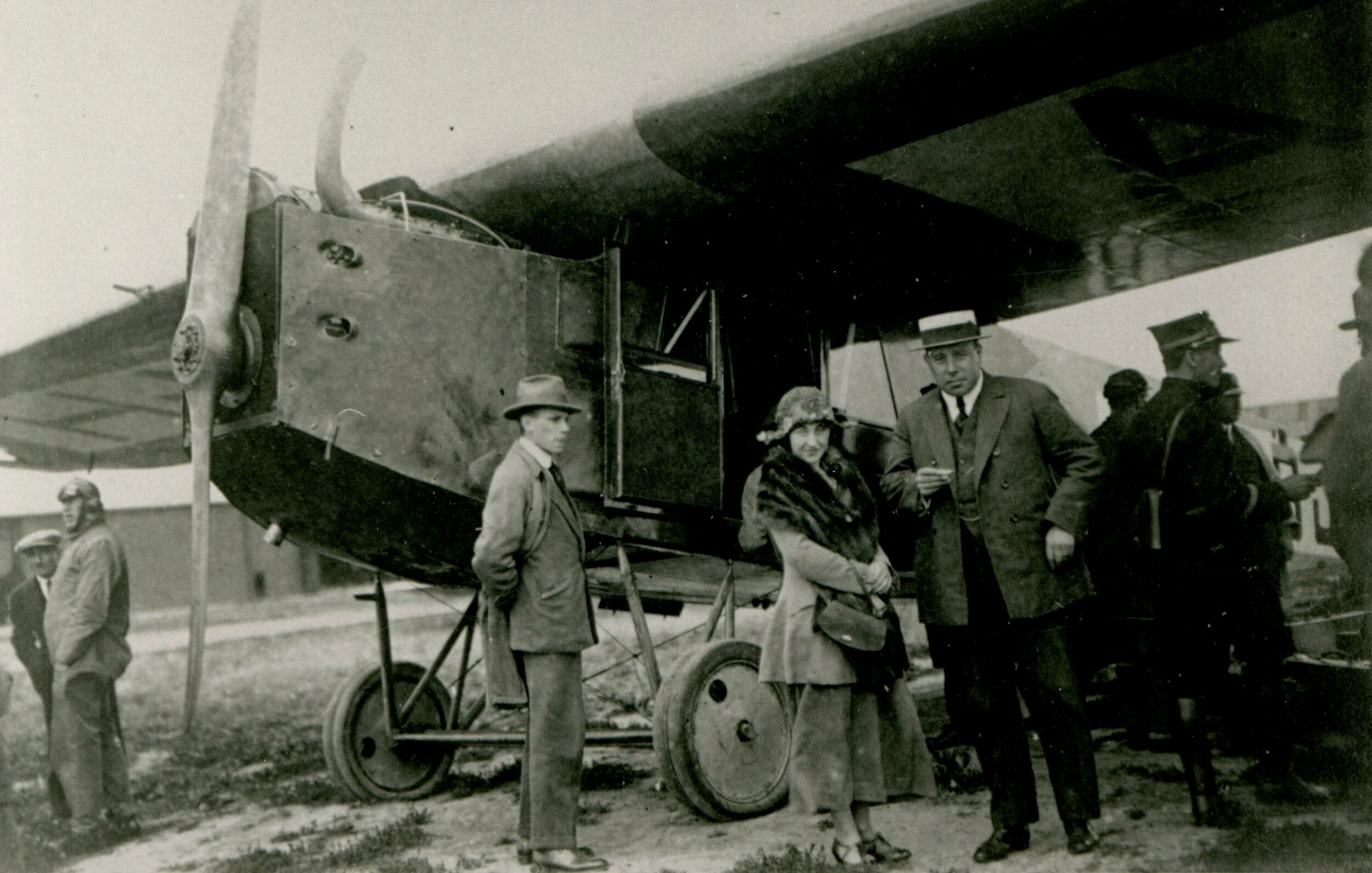
Civilian air travelers in 1920; F.III in the background.

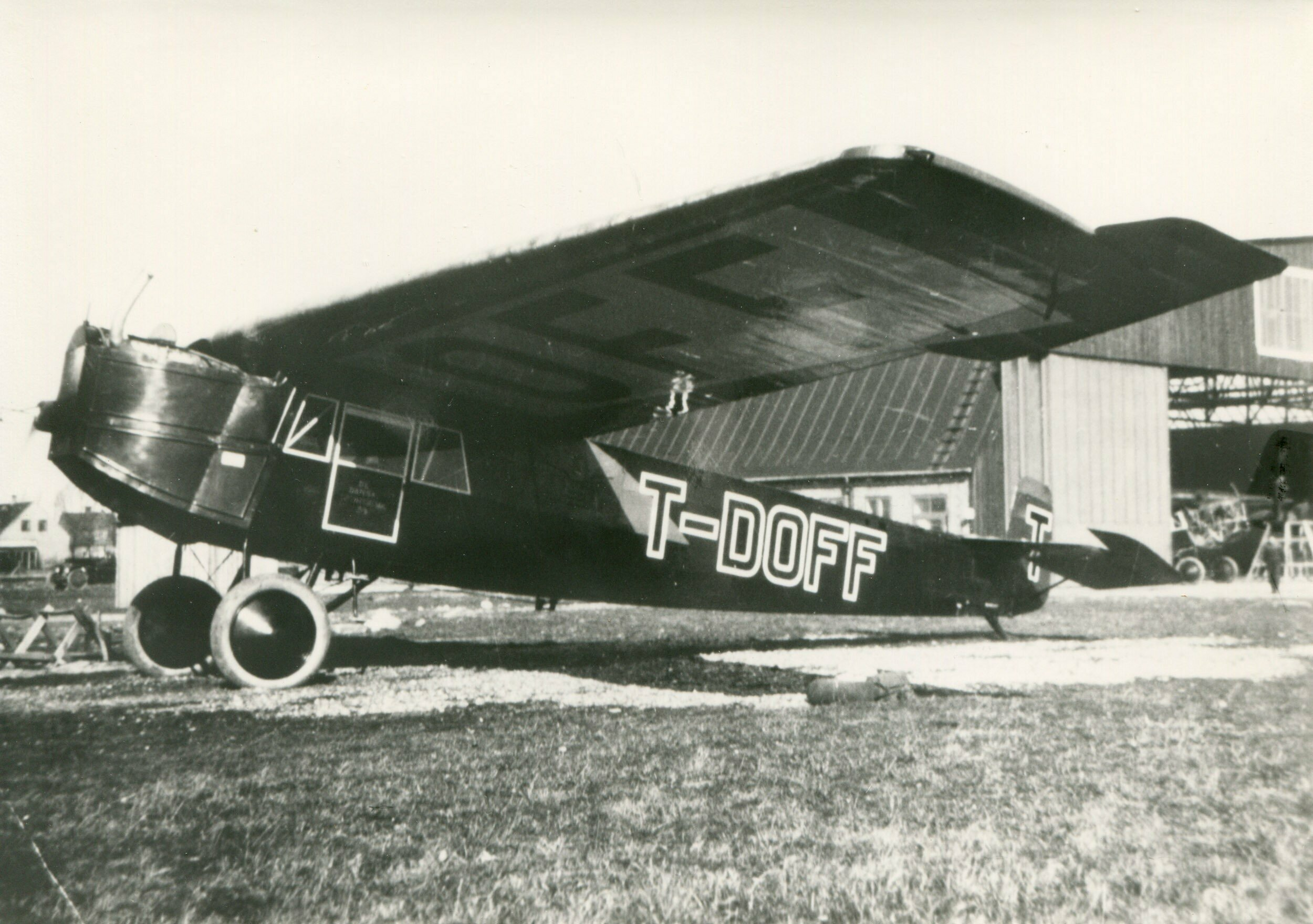
German license-built Fokker-Grulich F.III

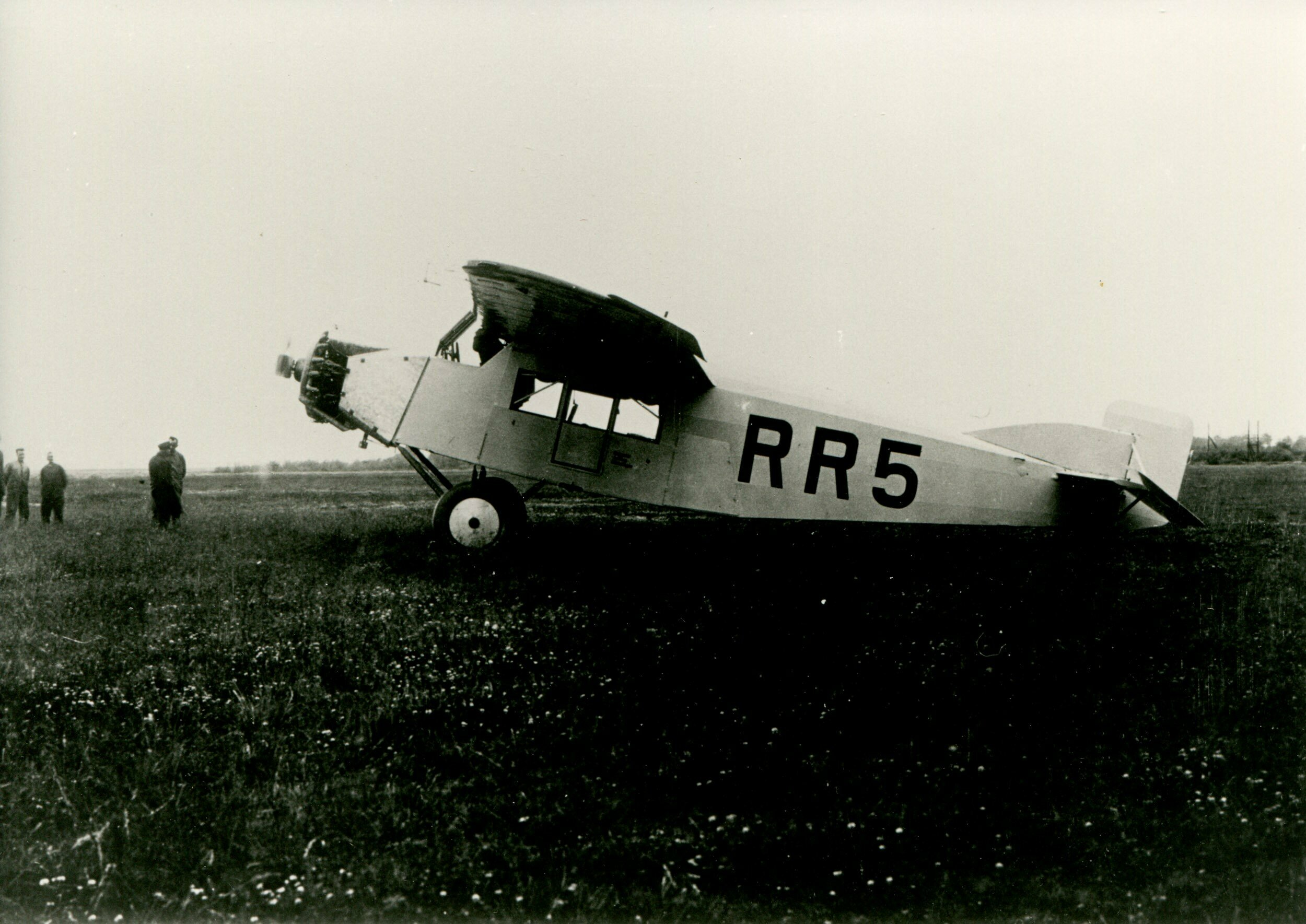
Grulich V.1 or F.IIIs, an improved model with a redesigned fuselage and tail

The F.III was first used by KLM when they reopened their Amsterdam-London service on 14 April 1921 (they did not, at this time operate over winter). Soon, F.IIIs were also flying on routes to Bremen, Brussels, Hamburg, and Paris. They proved to be very reliable aircraft. KLM received 14 F.IIIs from Fokker's German factory at Schwerin during 1921 and built two more itself from spares in the following year. This final pair used 268 kW (359 hp) Rolls-Royce Eagle VIII engines, with the pilot on the left.

Another operator of new F.IIIs was Deutsch-Russiche Luftverkehrs Gesellschaft (Deruluft) which used nine aircraft on their Berlin-Königsberg-Moscow route from May 1922. These machines, partially built in Schwerin and finished in the Netherlands at Veere, had Eagle engines. One was a Fokker-Grulich.

Deutsche Aero Lloyd gained a licence to build F.IIIs as they had for F.IIs and the company, with its southern subsidiary built and operated 18 of these Fokker-Grulich F.IIIs. Most of these used BMW engines, typically the 186 kW (249 hp) BMW IV in preference to the 138 kW (185 hp) BMW IIIa. Some of these were re-engined with the 239 kW (321 hp) BMW Va, and were designated F.IIIc.

Another operator from new was the Hungarian airline Malert, which received six Dutch-built aircraft for their Budapest-Vienna-Belgrade service from 1922 to 1929. These initially had BMW IIIa engines, but later ran with 172 kW (231 hp) Breitfeld & Daněk Hiero IV engines. They had larger wings, increased in area by about 14%. Deutsche Luft-Reederei also operated two, originally intended for KLM. Four F.IIIs probably went to the United States.

Later F.IIIs changed ownership frequently as airlines went bankrupt or merged. They were still flying commercially in Germany until about 1936.

== Accidents and incidents ==
The F.III as involved into two air crashes, that due to developing nature of air travel had a big impact. For example, one disappearance lead to the radios being required on aircraft.

- 1924 KLM Fokker F.III disappearance (This was the first major air accident of the airline KLM)
  - On 24 April 1924, Fokker F.III H-NABS of KLM departed Lympne for Rotterdam and Amsterdam. The aircraft was not heard of again. It was presumed to have crashed into the sea, killing the pilot and both passengers.
- On 25 June 1925, a KLM Fokker F.III, registration H-NABM, crashed at Landrécies, France in poor weather while on an Amsterdam-Paris service, killing all four on board.
- 1928 KLM Fokker F.III Waalhaven crash

== Operators ==
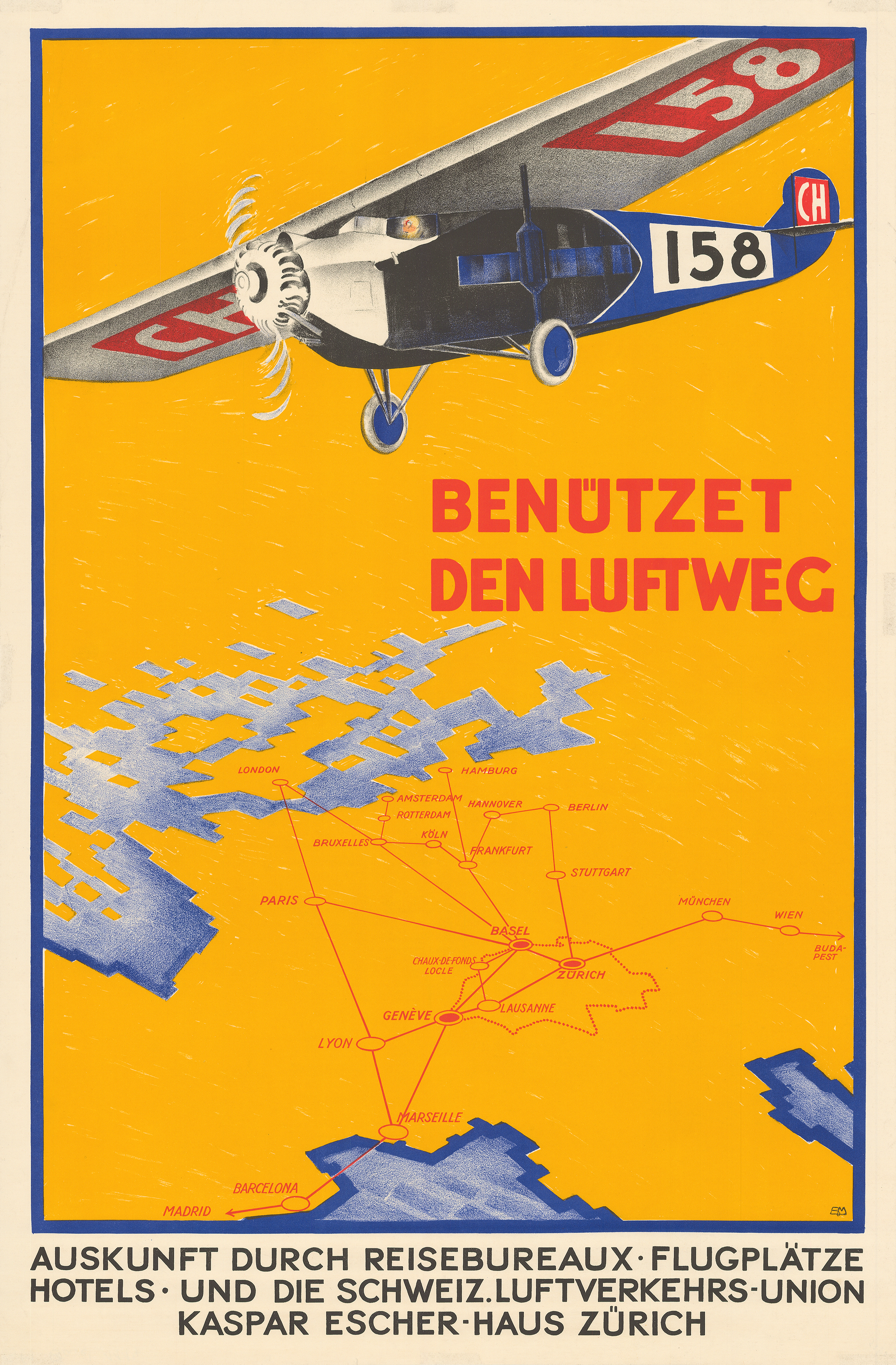
A Swiss airline poster featuring the F.III from 1927

Australia

- 1 Privately owned

Free City of Danzig

- Deutsche Luft-Reederei

Denmark

- Det Danske Luftfartselskab

Weimar Republic

- Deutsch-Russiche Luftverkehrs Gesellschaft (Deruluft)
- Deutsche Aero Lloyd
- Deutsche Aero Luft
- Sud-deutsche Luft Hansa

Hungary

- Malert

Netherlands

- Koninklijke Luchtvaart Maatschappij (KLM)

Soviet Union

- Deruluft

Switzerland

- Balair, operated 5 ex-KLM 1926-1928
- Ost Schweizer Aero Gesellschaft (East Swiss Aero Company); operated 1 ex-Balair until 1929

== Specifications ==
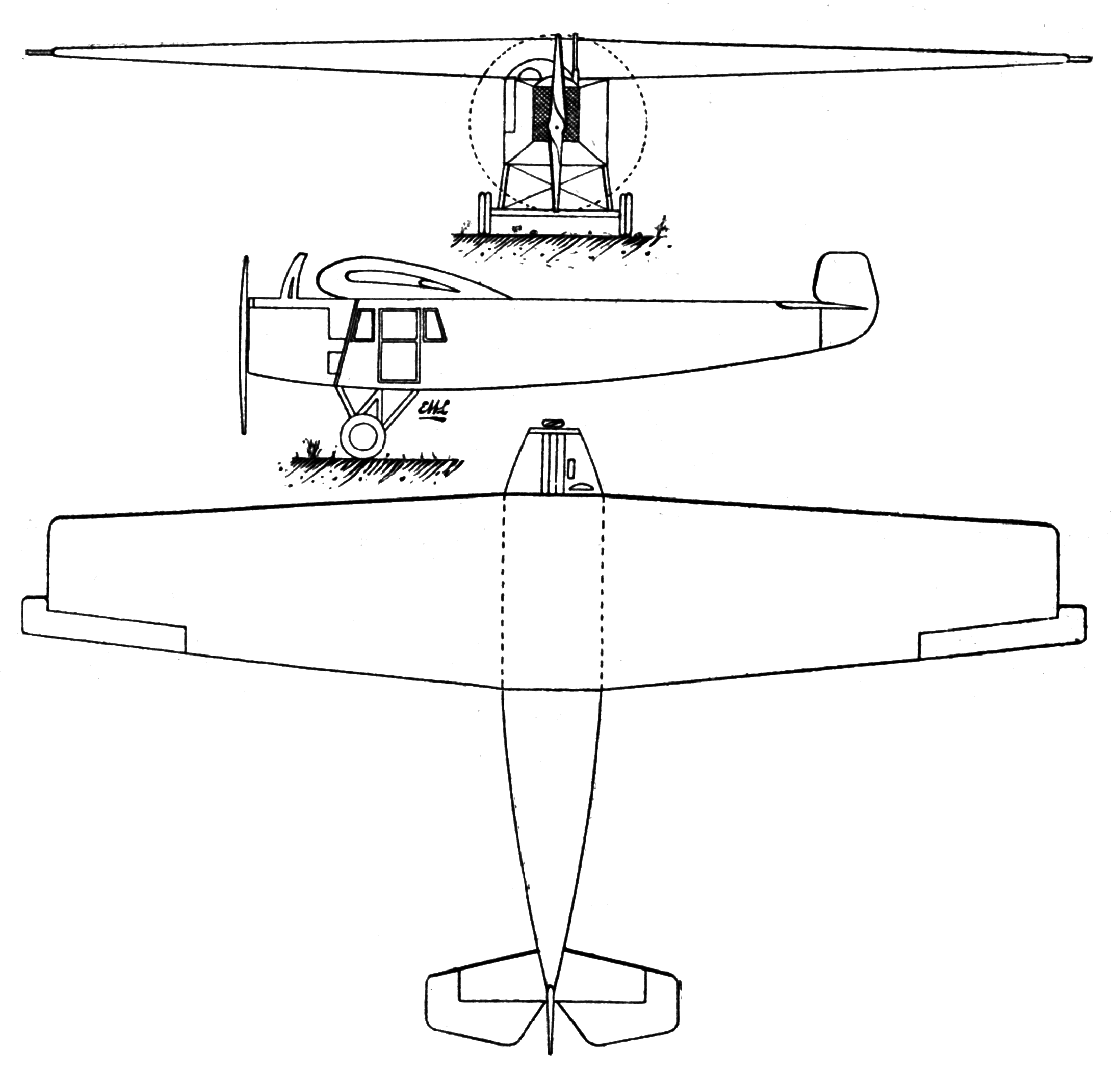
Fokker F.III 3-view drawing from Les Ailes 23 June 1921

Data from FOKKER COMMERCIAL AIRCRAFT from the F.1 of 1918 up to the Fokker 100 of today., Jane's all the World's Aircraft 1924, Flight 26 May 1921 : The Fokker F III Commercial Monoplane

General characteristics

- Crew: 1
- Capacity: 5 passengers
- Length: 11.07 m (36 ft 4 in)
- Wingspan: 17.68 m (58 ft 0 in)
- Height: 3.2 m (10 ft 6 in)
- Wing area: 45.65 m^{2} (491.4 sq ft)
- Empty weight: 1,200 kg (2,646 lb)
- Gross weight: 1,905 kg (4,200 lb)
- Fuel capacity: 355 L (94 US gal; 78 imp gal)
- Powerplant: 1 × Siddeley Puma 6-cylinder water-cooled in-line piston engine, 170 kW (230 hp)
- Propellers: 2-bladed fixed-pitch wooden propeller

Performance

- Maximum speed: 169 km/h (105 mph, 91 kn)
- Cruise speed: 135 km/h (84 mph, 73 kn)
- Range: 1,000 km (620 mi, 540 nmi)
