= Forêt de Mormal =

Forest in France

Coordinates: 50°12′N 3°44′E

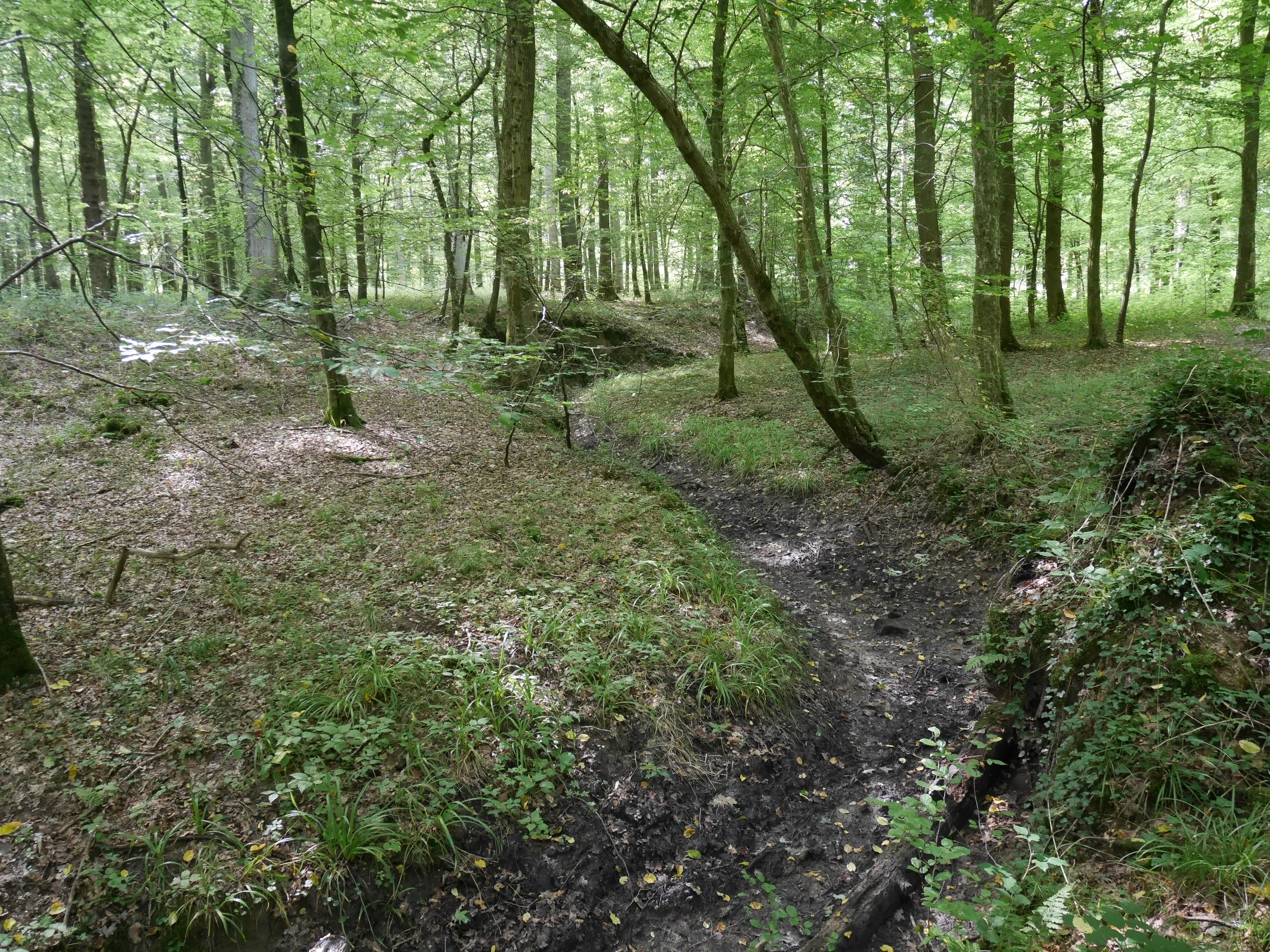
The Nervii trail in the Mormal forest

The Forêt de Mormal (Forest of Mormal) is a forest in France, near the Franco-Belgian border. It is best known to the British for its role in the retreat from Mons in August 1914. Its perceived lack of passable roads forced I and II Corps of the British army to divide and the two corps did not reunite for some days. However, some units of the British army did pass through the forest. The German army also passed through the forest, taking Haig's I Corps by surprise. It is the largest forest in the Nord area, at around 9000 hectares.
