= Fokker F.II =

1919 commercial aircraft

F.II
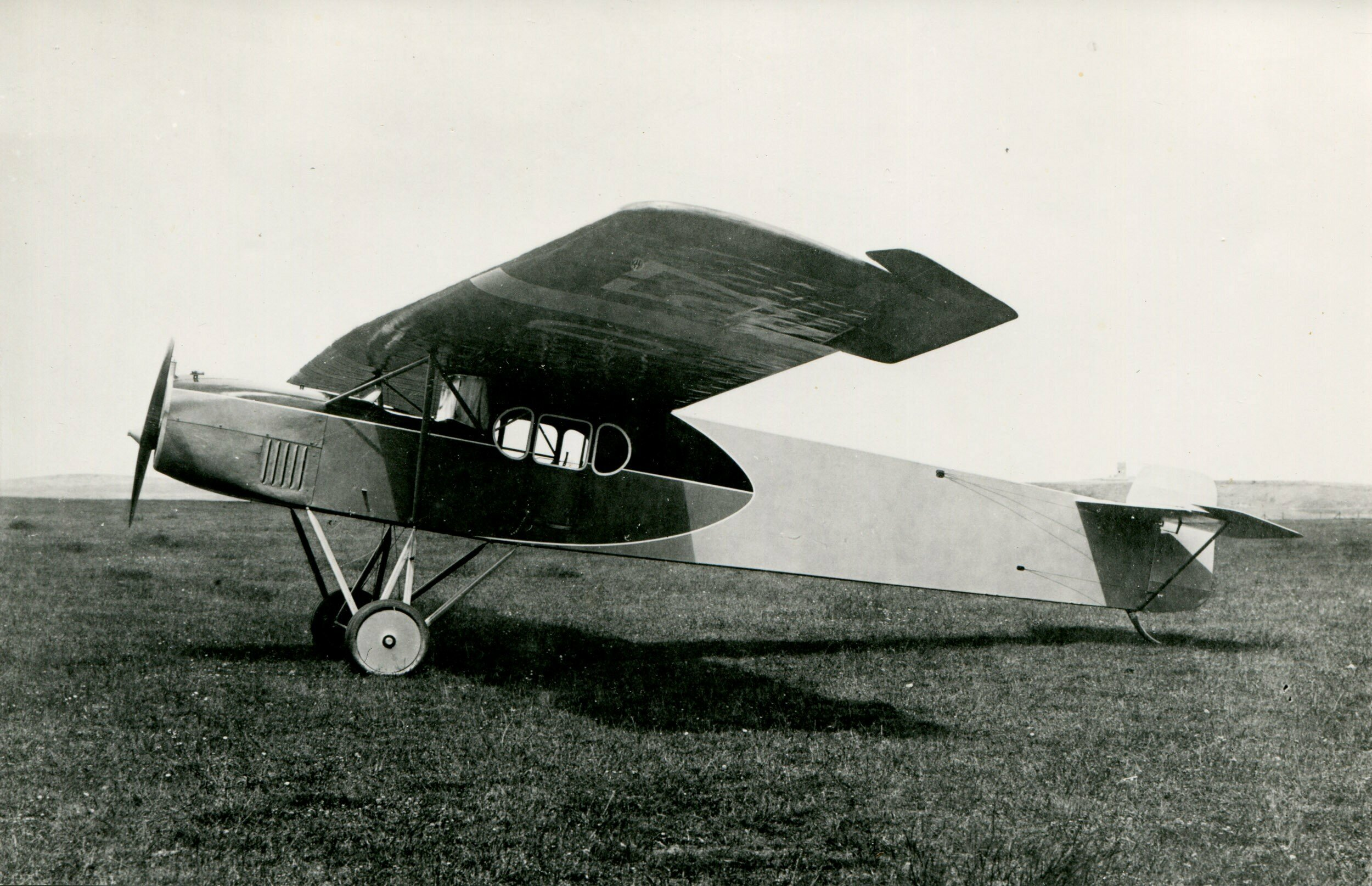

General information
- Type: Airliner
- Manufacturer: Fokker
- Designer: Reinhold Platz
- Primary users: Deutsche Aero Lloyd Deutsche Luft Hansa, KLM
- Number built: about 23

History
- First flight: October 1919
- Retired: 1934
- Variant: Fokker F.III

The Fokker F.II was the first of a long series of commercial aircraft from the Fokker Aircraft Company, flying in 1919. In a biplane age, it presented a distinct clean, high-wing monoplane style that sold successfully across Europe and North America during the development of commercial passenger-carrying aviation.

This design lead to the Fokker F.III which also proved a commercial success. A license produced version was built in Germany, with some modification is sometimes called the Fokker-Grulich F.II

A non-flying replica of a Fokker F.II was built for the Dutch airline KLM, and is on display at the Aviodrome museum in Lelystad in the Netherlands.

== Design and development ==
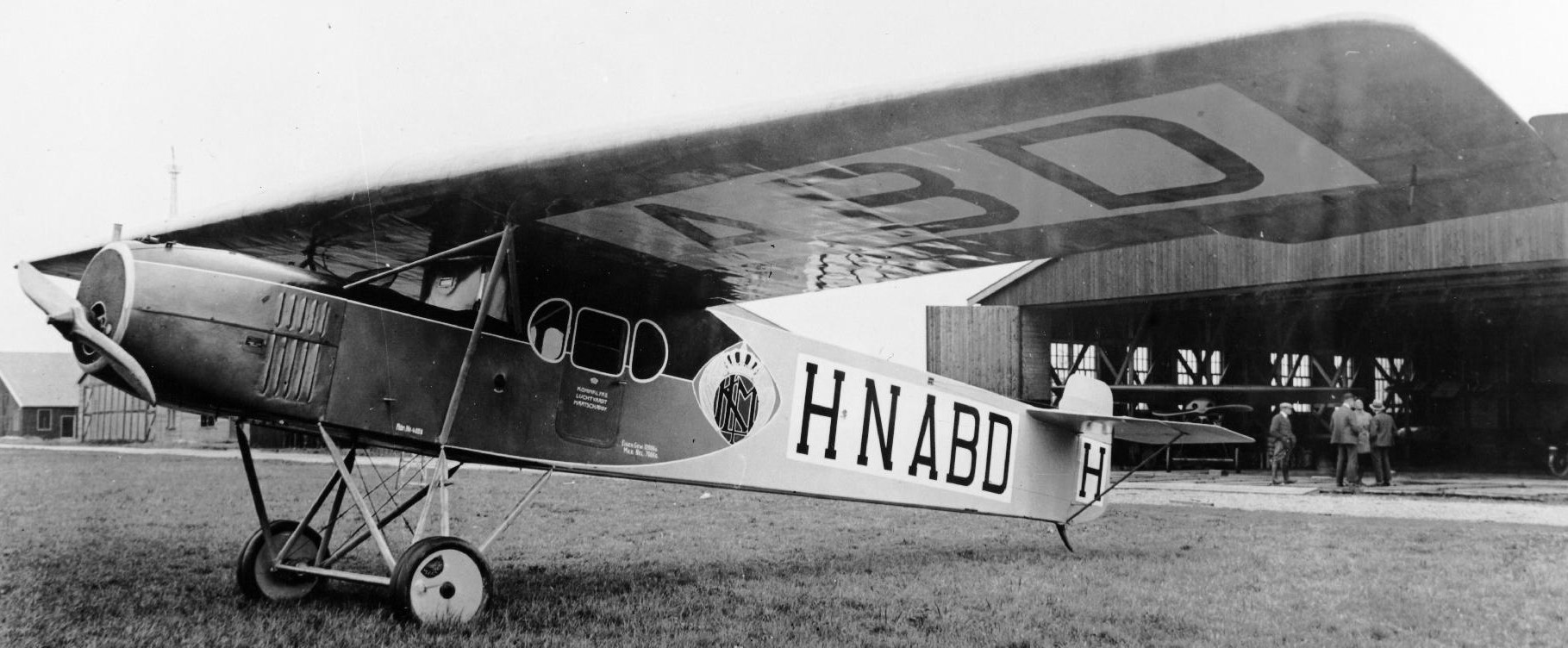
Early Fokker F.II with round engine radiator

The Fokker F.II was a single engined high-wing cantilever monoplane with a design lineage that went back to designer Reinhold Platz's Dr.I triplane, via the biplane D.VII and monoplane D.VIII fighters and his unflown F.I civil design. The Dr.I was the first aircraft to use the thick high lift/drag airfoils that enabled high climb rates and also allowed internal wing bracing. Hence the triplane wing needed no external wire bracing and its monoplane successors, apart from attachments to the fuselage were simple cantilever structures.

The F.II had other characteristic early-Fokker design features: a wing constructed of wood, fully skinned in plywood, with ailerons extending beyond the wingtips and a deep sided square section fuselage of welded steel tube covered in fabric which provided enough directional stability that no vertical fin was fitted. The F.II had a fixed undercarriage, the main units of which were joined by a cross-axle.

There was enclosed accommodation for four passengers; a fifth could travel alongside the pilot in his unenclosed cockpit, in a seat originally intended for a mechanic or navigator.

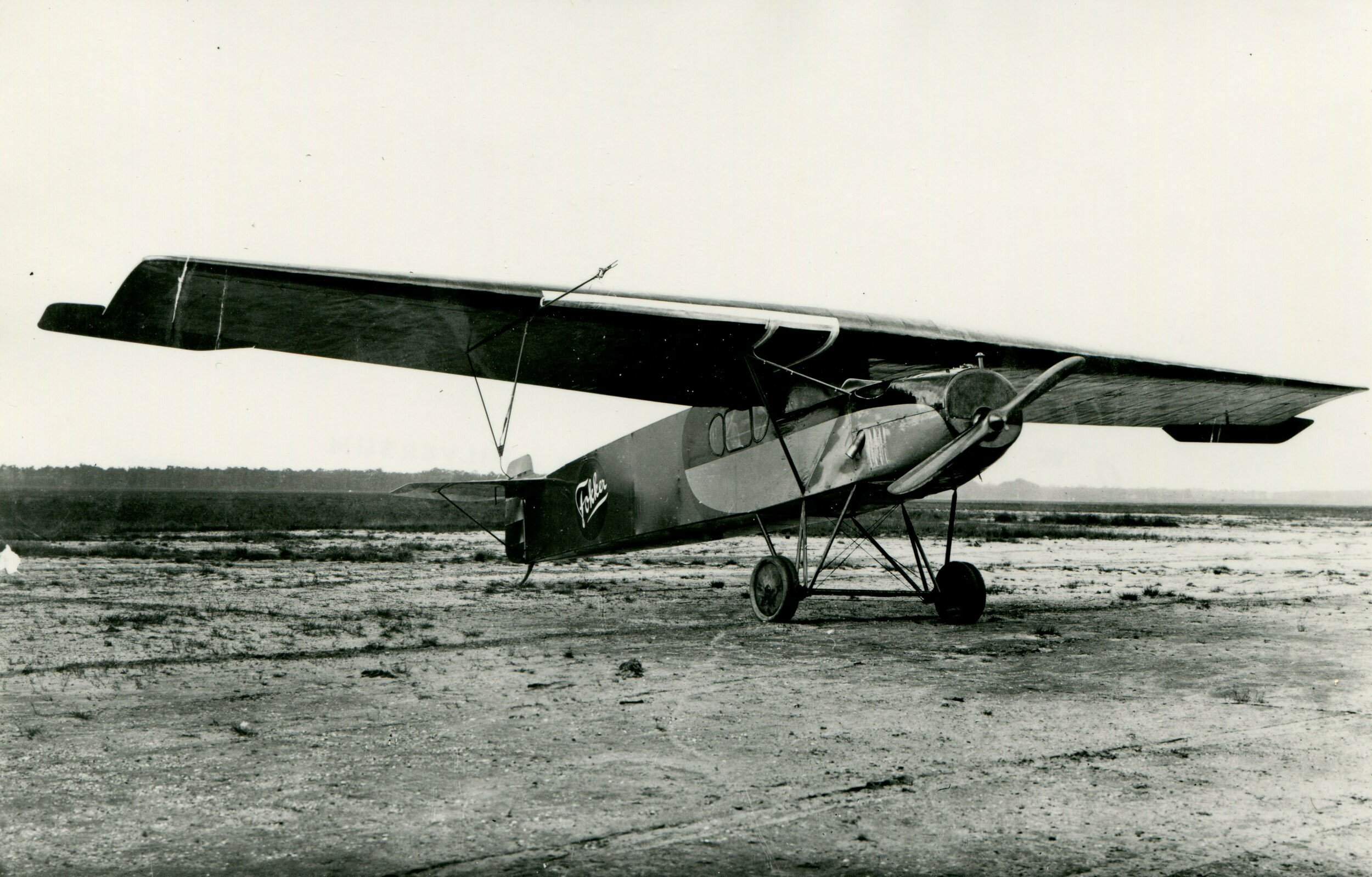
The V.45 prototype in 1919

The prototype F.II, known by the company designation V.45, was constructed at the Fokker factory in Schwerin, Germany, and made its first flight there in October 1919. When Anthony Fokker decided to relocate the firm to the Netherlands, the V.45 was illegally flown across the border on 20 March 1920. Even after this, perhaps another three examples were built at Schwerin before production shifted to Veere. All F.IIs built by Fokker had the 138 kW (185 hp) BMW IIIa engine. The Dutch airline KLM, which ordered the first two F.IIs after the prototype, found the BMW IIIa lacked power and had cooling problems. After an experiment with a 133 kW (178 hp) Mercedes motor, KLM re-engined both of their aircraft with the 179 kW (240 hp) Armstrong Siddeley Puma.

In Germany, however, the technical manager of Deutsche Aero Lloyd, Karl Grulich, arranged to build the type under licence for the airline, making a few modifications of his own to the design. These included strengthened landing gear, a redesigned cockpit, and redesigned trapezoidal cabin windows. At least 20, the great majority of F.IIs, were assembled by Deutsche Aero Lloyd at Staaken, Berlin. They built the fuselages there, but the wings were built by Albatros and were then supplied to the airline for final assembly. These rather heavier aircraft were powered by 172 kW (230 hp) BMW IV (and later 239 kW/320 hp BMW Va) motors.

== Operational history ==
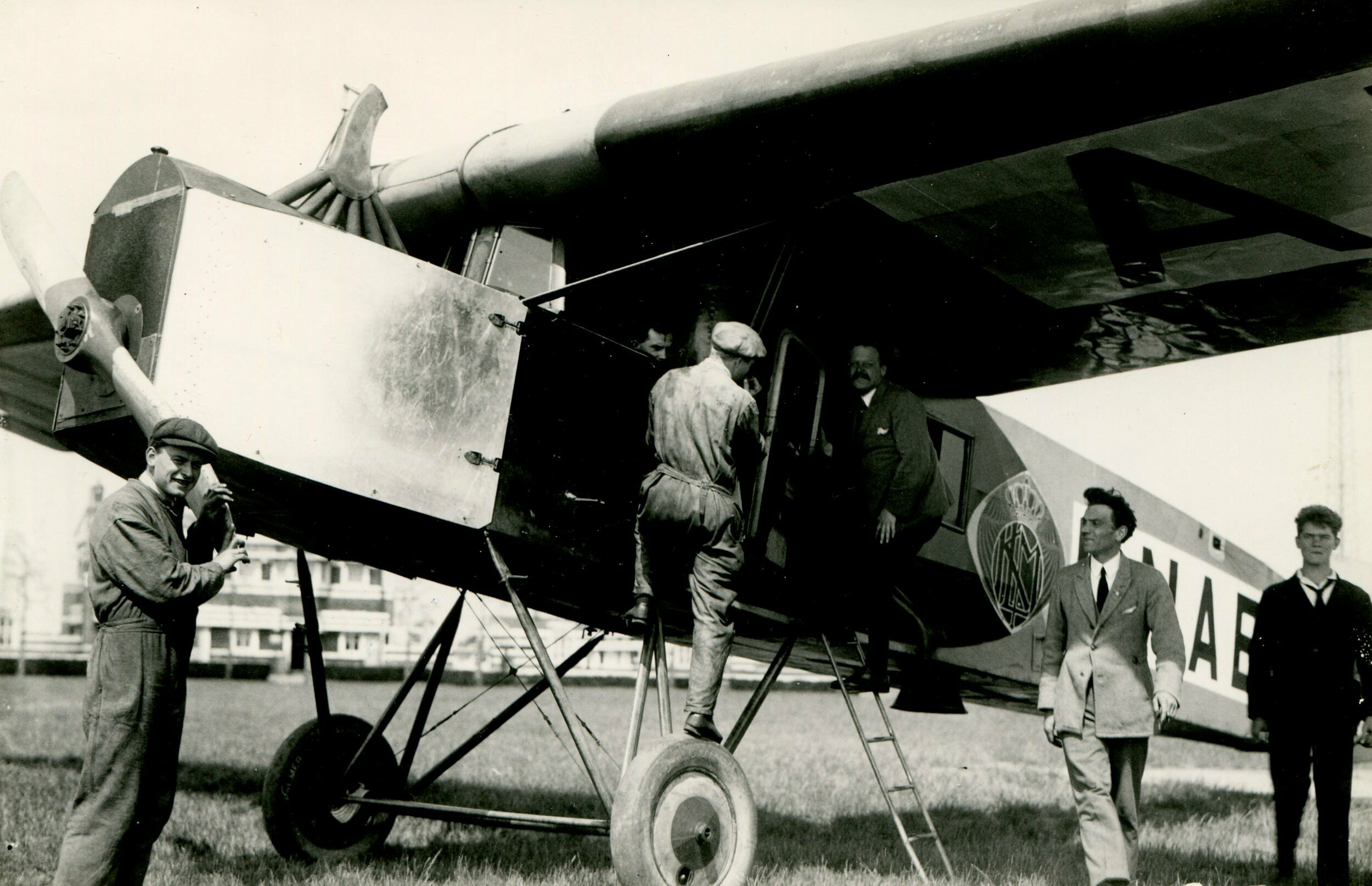
KLM F.II, with square radiator.

The Dutch airline KLM operated two F.IIs between 1920 and 1927; the type was first Fokker aircraft to be used by the airline. After their withdrawal by KLM, both aircraft were acquired by SABENA, who operated them on their Brussels-Antwerp route. The machines that Fokker had built in Germany were bought by Deutsche Luftreederei and registered in the Free City of Danzig. Deutsche Aero Lloyd's aircraft were used right up until the time the airline was absorbed by Deutsche Luft Hansa in 1926, at which point ten machines remained. These were put to use on regional routes linking Cologne with Aachen, Essen, Krefeld, and Mülheim until 1934.

A replica of the F.II was built and put display at Aviodrome museum in the Netherlands.

== Operators ==
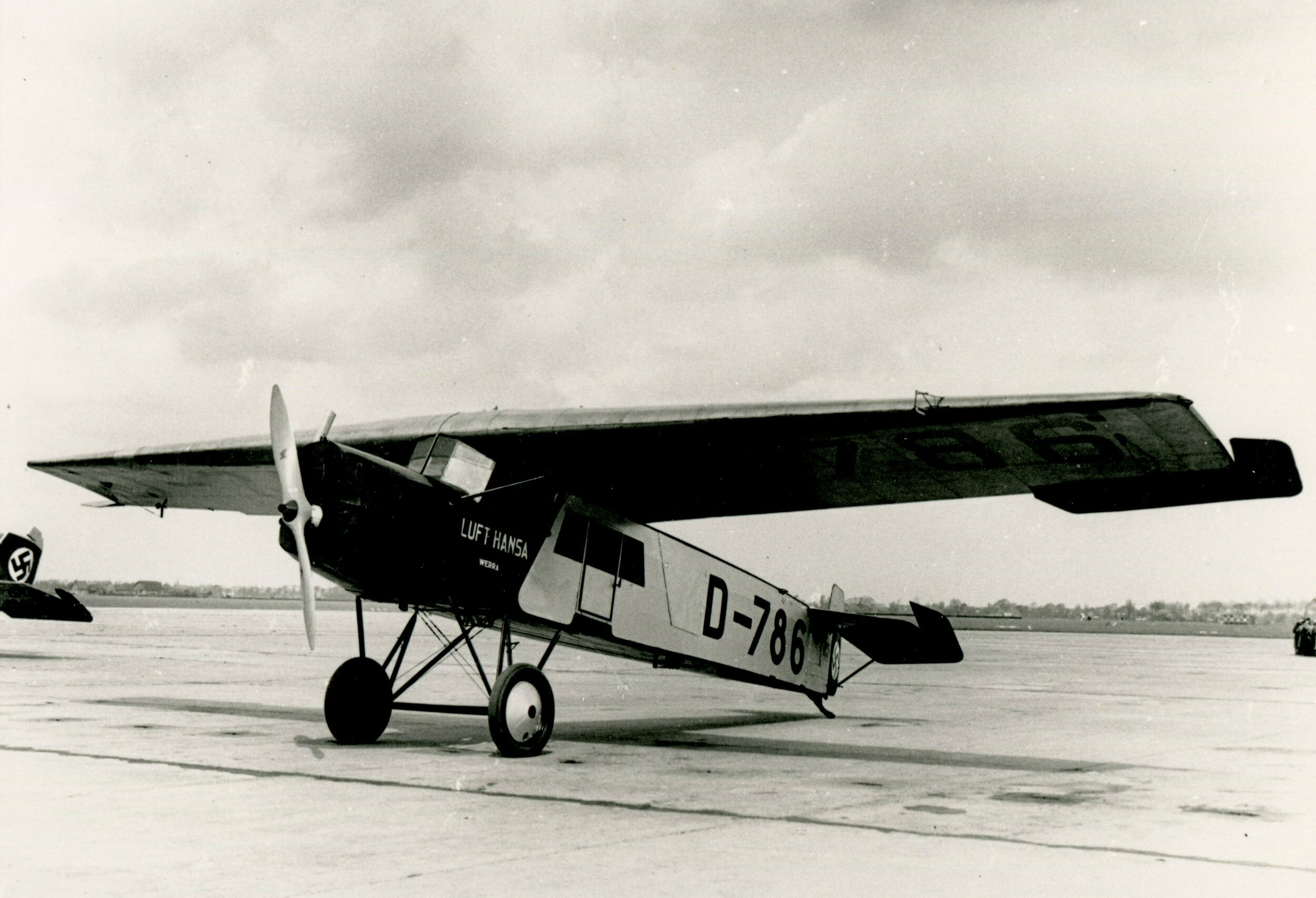
The license-built Fokker-Grulich F.II in service with Deutsche Luft Hansa.

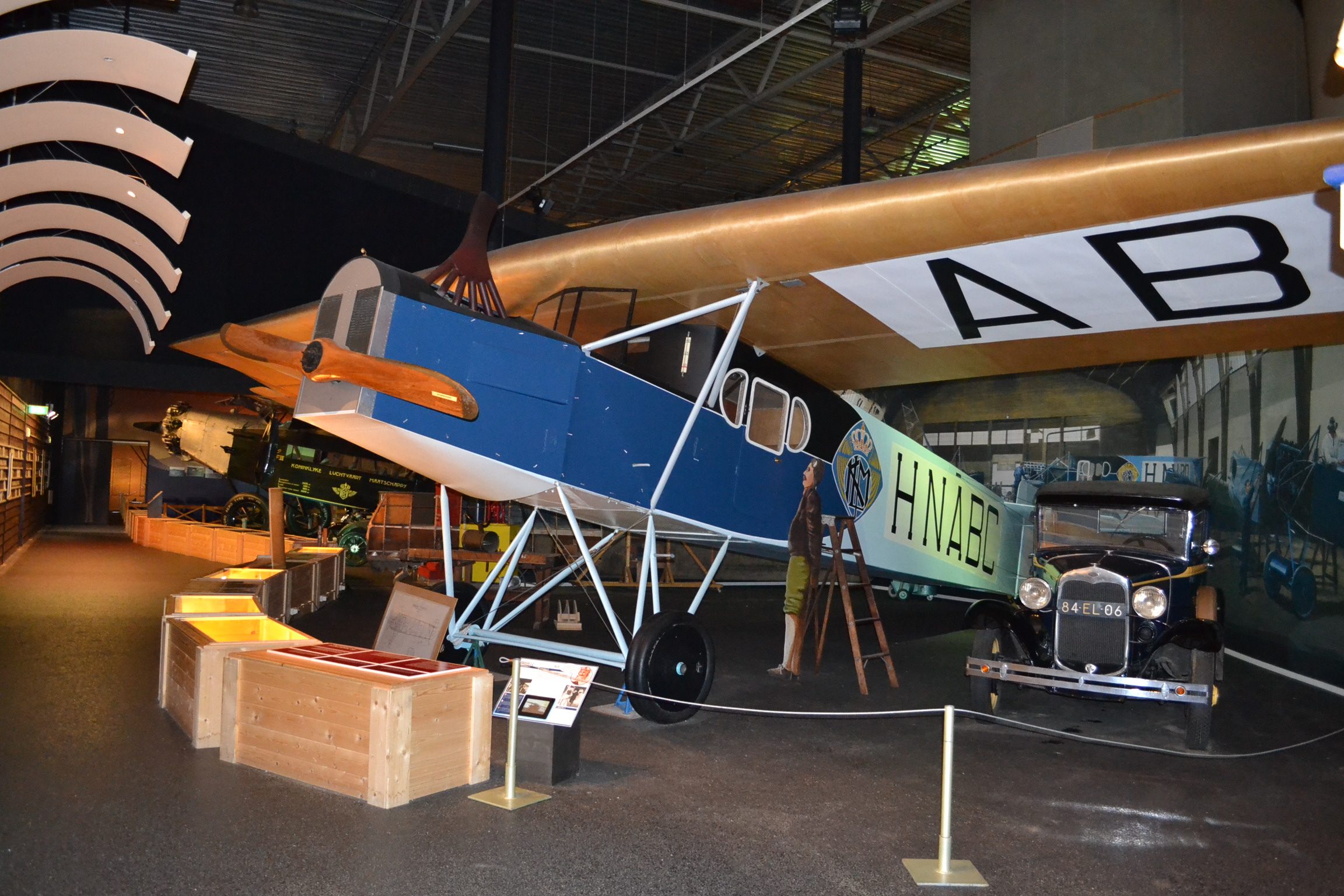
The replica model Fokker F.II on display

Belgium

- SABENA

Free City of Danzig

- Deutsche Luft-Reederei

Germany

- Deutsche Aero Lloyd
- Deutsche Luft Hansa

Netherlands

- KLM

== Specifications (Puma powered) ==
Data from de Leeuw p.13

General characteristics

- Crew: One pilot
- Capacity: 5 passengers
- Length: 11.65 m (38 ft 3 in)
- Wingspan: 16.10 m (52 ft 10 in)
- Height: 3.66 m (12 ft 0 in)
- Wing area: 38.2 m^{2} (411 sq ft)
- Empty weight: 1,200 kg (2,650 lb)
- Gross weight: 1,900 kg (4,190 lb)
- Powerplant: 1 × Armstrong Siddeley Puma , 180 kW (240 hp)

Performance

- Maximum speed: 150 km/h (93 mph, 81 kn)
- Cruise speed: 120 km/h (75 mph, 65 kn)
- Range: 1,200 km (750 mi, 650 nmi)

== Bibliography ==
- Anderson, J. D. A History of Aerodynamics (1997). Cambridge University Press. ISBN 0-521-66955-3
- de Leeuw, R. Fokker Commercial Aircraft (1994). Fokker Publications
- Herris, Jack & Leckscheid, Jörn (2023). Fokker Aircraft of WWI: Volume 5: 1918 Designs, Part 1 - Prototypes & D.VI: A Centennial Perspective on Great War Airplanes. Great War Aviation Centennial Series. Vol. 55A. n.p.: Aeronaut Books. ISBN 978-1-953201-09-6.
- Taylor, Michael J. H. (1989). Jane's Encyclopedia of Aviation. London: Studio Editions. p. 405.
- World Aircraft Information Files. London: Bright Star Publishing. pp. File 894 Sheet 36.
- "A Fokker Six-seater Limousine Monoplane". Flight. Vol. XII, no. 609. 26 August 1920. pp. 931–932.
- "A Fokker Raid on London". Flight. Vol. XII, no. 615. 7 October 1920. pp. 1064–1066.
