= Locquignol =

- Commune
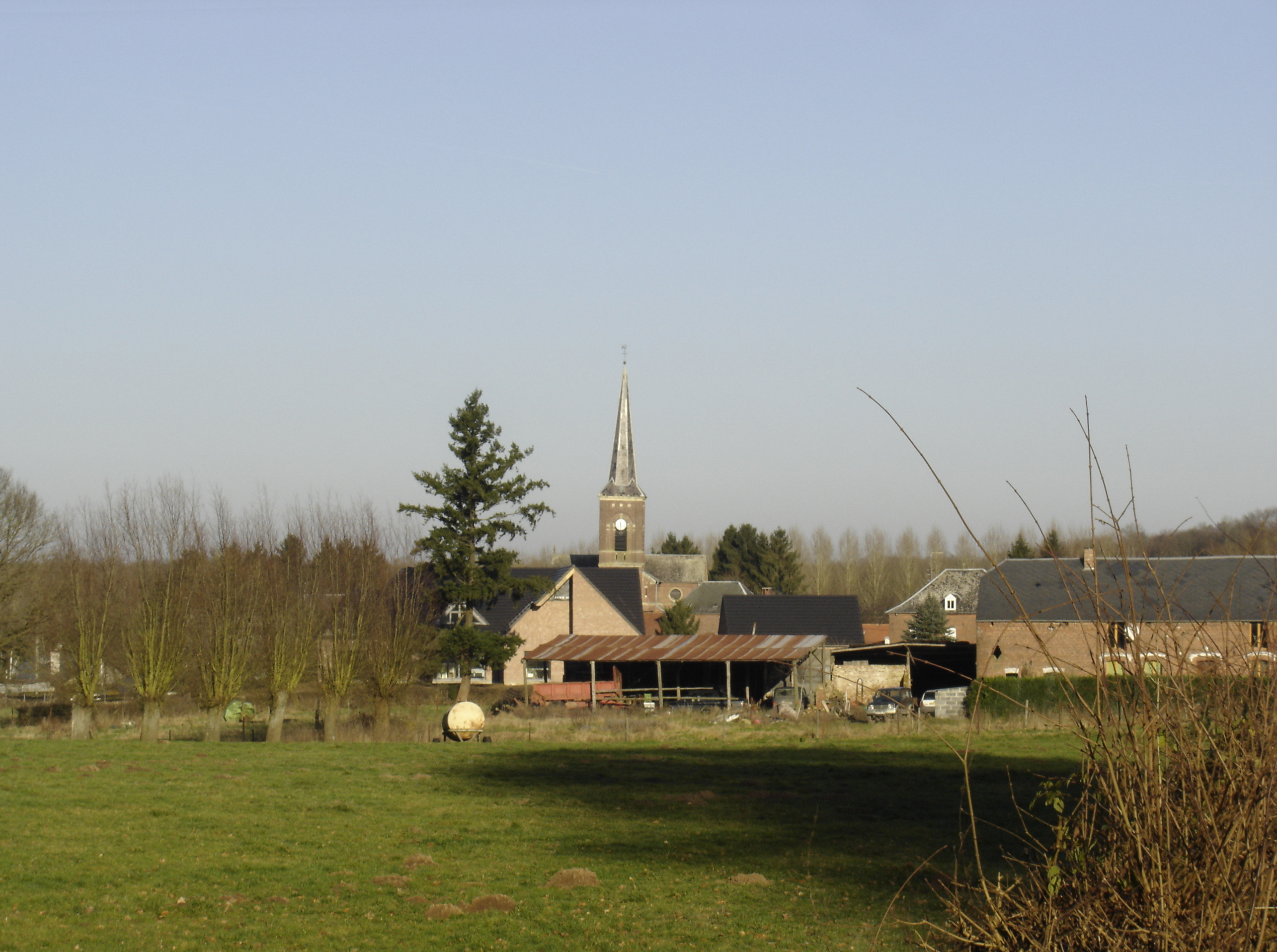
- The village center

- Coat of arms
- Location of Locquignol
- Location within France Location within Hauts-de-France
- Coordinates: 50°11′58″N 3°43′01″E
- Country: France
- Region: Hauts-de-France
- Department: Nord
- Arrondissement: Avesnes-sur-Helpe
- Canton: Avesnes-sur-Helpe
- Intercommunality: Pays de Mormal

Government
  - Mayor (2020–2026): Jean-Claude Bonnin
- Area^{1}: 97.55 km^{2} (37.66 sq mi)
- Elevation: 160 m (520 ft)
- Highest elevation: 174 m (571 ft)
- Lowest elevation: 125 m (410 ft)
- Population (2023): 301
  - Density: 3.09/km^{2} (7.99/sq mi)
- Time zone: UTC+01:00 (CET)
  - Summer (DST): UTC+02:00 (CEST)
- INSEE/Postal code: 59353 /59530
- ^{1} French Land Register data, which excludes lakes, ponds, glaciers > 1 km^{2} (0.386 sq mi or 247 acres) and river estuaries.

Locquignol (French pronunciation: [lɔkiɲɔl]) is a commune in the Nord department in northern France.

== Heraldry ==
Arms of Locquignol	The arms of Locquignol are blazoned : Azure, 3 mascles argent.

== Points of interest ==
- Arboretum de l'Étang David

== See also ==
- Communes of the Nord department
