= Waalhaven =

Coordinates: 51.876°N 4.443°E

- Neighborhood of Rotterdam
- Interactive map of Waalhaven
- Country: Netherlands
- Province: South Holland
- COROP: Rotterdam
- Time zone: UTC+1 (CET)

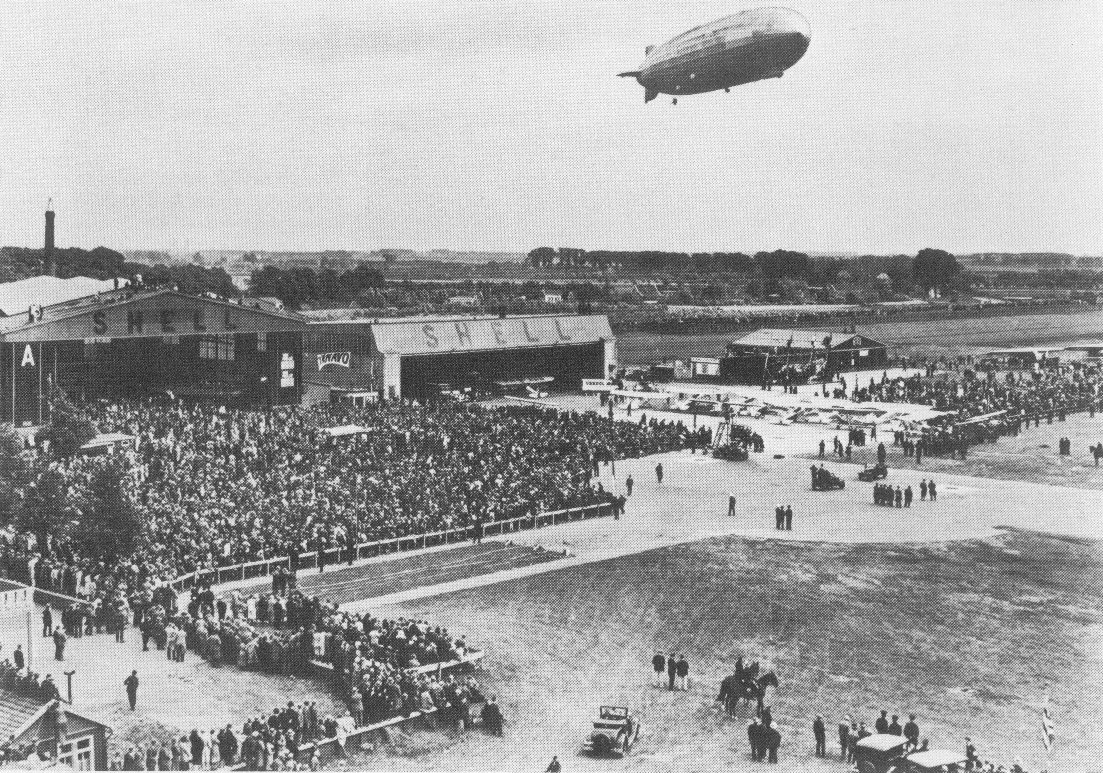
Waalhaven Airport in 1932, with the Graf Zeppelin in the background.

The Waalhaven is a harbour in Rotterdam, Netherlands. It is one of the excavated harbors on the south bank of the Meuse river in Rotterdam. With an area of 3.1 square kilometers, it is one of the larger dug harbor basins in the world.

The harbour area includes an industrial zone focusing on maritime, industrial and logistics industries. The port additionally offers offshore power and energy solutions for vessels, as well as a dedicated data center.

== Waalhaven Airport ==
The Waalhaven district used to be home to an airport, Vliegveld Waalhaven (Waalhaven Airport). It was the second civilian airport in the Netherlands and was opened in 1920. Part of it was also in use by the Dutch military's 3rd JaVA Fokker G.I squadron in 1940.

Among others, the N.V. Koolhoven aircraft factory was located at this airport. The factory and airport were destroyed in 1940 by the Dutch army so they could not fall into the hands of the Germans. After the Second World War, the city was prospecting an airport, but the existing airfield at Waalhaven was written off the list because the damage that was caused to prevent the airfield's capture was so great it was considered not worth repairing. Instead, aviation has now moved to Zestienhoven Airport.
