= List of aviation accidents and incidents in the Netherlands =

This list of aviation accidents and incidents in the Netherlands includes aviation crashes and severe incidents. Not all reported and minor investigated incidents are listed. The list also doesn't include airplane crashes in another country with many Dutch victims or a Dutch airline or Dutch-owned airplane crash in another country.

The deadliest crash was El Al Flight 1862 with 43 deaths. More military airplanes crashed than other kind of airplanes. Most of the military airplane crashes occurred in the Netherlands during World War II, with a total of around 6,000 airplanes. While during World War I the Netherlands was neutral, some airships crashed in the country. After World War II, over 10 military airplanes crashed each year (note that the list is incomplete) in the 1950s. The deadliest accident with a military airplane was the 1946 Apeldoorn aircraft crash with a total of 24 deaths. In 1980 the Dutch army bought their firsts F-16 fighters. In 1993 the Netherlands' 29th F-16 crashed (note that not all of these F-16s crashed in the Netherlands).

== Outside war time ==
Note that the Netherlands was not actively involved in World War I, so incidents during this war are listed in this section.

Year	Article	Image	Deaths	Description
27 August 1910	Clément van Maasdijk		1	The first fatality in Dutch aviation. On 27 August 1910 Van Maasdijk made a test flight in a Sommer Biplane the day before an air show in Arnhem. At 50 metres altitude he lost control and crashed.
1 February 1916	Zeppelin LZ 54		15	While returning from her first bombing raid on the United Kingdom in early 1916, she came down in the North Sea. Her crew survived the crash, but drowned after the crew of a British fishing vessel refused to rescue them.
14 May 1917	Zeppelin LZ 64		21	German Zeppelin LZ 64 was destroyed by RNAS Curtis H12 flying boat flown by Flight Commander Robert Leckie (later Air Vice Marshal) near Terschelling during a reconnaissance mission.
14 June 1917	Zeppelin LZ 92		25	German Zeppelin LZ 92 was shot down by British (RNAS) Curtiss H.12 flying boat plane and crashed off Vlieland. All 25 on board died as it exploded in midair.
8 August 1917	Zeppelin LZ 100		19	German Zeppelin LZ 100 was intercepted and shot down 10 kilometres from Ameland by a British Sopwith Camel (N6812, flown by Lt Culley) which took off from a lighter towed by the Destroyer HMS Redoubt.
14 December 1917	C.26		0	Coastal class airship C.26 of the British Royal Naval Air Service, in search for airship C.27, had run into difficulties off the British coast due to an engine failure. It flew in the direction of the Netherlands. To maintain altitude while flying over water, ballast and equipment was thrown overboard. When hitting the ground, three crew members jumped out of the airship, one was injured. The airship took off again and the final crew member was able to get out at Sliedrecht. The airship flew on without crew and destroyed many electricity wires and poles. It finally crashed onto a bakery in Eemnes. The baker later received 600 guilders in compensation from the British government.
21 May 1921			0	The KLM Fokker F.III H-NABL had an accident at Hekelingen and was damaged.
29 October 1921			0	The pikot of KLM Fokker F.III H-NABL was lost and had to make a landing during the night in the darkness at Waalhaven Airport. The plane flips over due to poor lighting. The airplane was damaged.
24 July 1928	1928 KLM Fokker F.III Waalhaven crash		1	KLM owned Fokker F.III stalled on takeoff and crashed after it struck boats in the Waalhaven harbour into the water. One passenger died, as the passengers were not aware of the emergency exit.
23 April 1929			0	In the evening of 23 April 1929 a military airplane of Soesterberg Air Base crashed at Westerstrand on Texel. The people on board survived.
15 July 1930			1	A military Fokker fighter crashed during a test flight north of Soesterberg Air Base. The pilot died and the plane was destroyed.
15 August 1930			0	Military airplane no. 555 of Soesterberg Air Base crashed between Amersfoort and Nijkerk. The two people on board had only minor injuries.
25 April 1932			1	A military airplane crashed at Soesterberg Air Base. The sergeant student-pilot was killed and the plane destroyed.
17 February 1933			0	A military airplane crashed from 400 metres at the “Schoolweg”, Soesterberg. The pilot was only minor injured.
6 May 1933			0	A military C.6 airplane crashed near Soesterberg Air Base during a test flight. The pilot was injured.
8 August 1933			1	French glider pilot R. Huizinga crashed at Soesterberg Air Base during a test flight and was killed.
9 October 1933			4	Two military airplanes had a mid-air collision above Lienden. One caught fire and both planes crashed. All four people on board died.
14 July 1935	1935 Amsterdam Fokker F.XXII crash		6	A Fokker F22 (named: "Kwikstaart") operated by KLM crashed 200 metres from Schiphol Airport. The four crew members and two British passengers died.
21 August 1936			2	A military airplane from Soesterberg, crashed at a potato field in Hilversum. Both people on board were killed.
5 April 1937			0	A S.4 training airplane of Soesterberg Air Base crashed in the IJsselmeer near Schellingwoude. The two people on board were injured.
8 July 1938			0	A marine airplane crashed due to fog in the IJsselmeer near Spakenburg. The two people on board were injured.
28 October 1938			0	The KLM DC-2 PH-AKS (named “Sperwer”) had a crash during landing at Schiphol due to fog. One crew member is injured. The aircraft is heavily damaged.
14 November 1938			6	A Douglas DC-3 (named: "IJsvogel") operated by KLM crashed during the landing phase near Schiphol Airport de landing op Schiphol neer. Six people of the 19 people on board were killed, including four of the five crew members.
9 December 1938			4	A KLM operated Lockheed Super Electra (named: "Ekster") crashed shortly after take-off and burned down. Four crew members died.
6 June 1939			1	A KLM operated Douglas DC-2 (named: "Nachtegaal") was on a training flight. There was an engine failure and crashed near Schiphol. The plane crashes into a military guard post. Although the occupants are unharmed, one of the soldiers is killed and five injured.
10 June 1939			3	A KLM operated Koolhoven FK-43 (named: "Krekel") crashed in Vlissingen. All three on board died.
1939-1945: World War II (separate list)
7 October 1946	1946 Apeldoorn aircraft crash		24	A Fairey Firefly of the Netherlands Naval Aviation Service crashed next to the Hogere Burgerschool in Apeldoorn, the Netherlands. 22 children lost their lives, together with the pilot and the mother of the pilot.
14 November 1946	1946 KLM Douglas DC-3 Amsterdam accident		26	A KLM operated Douglas C-47 PH-TBW crashed near Schiphol Airport after a mistake during the landing. All 21 passengers and 5 crew members died, including writer Herman de Man.
28 December 1947				A KLM operated Douglas DC-3 domestic flight from Amsterdam to Leeuwarden started a missed approach due to poor visibility. The left wing hit the steeple of the 70 metres high Saint Boniface church. Although the outer three meters of the wing broke off, the pilots managed to perform a belly landing in a field near Boxum. The airplane lost both propellers during the landing.
1 May 1948			0	KLM's newest acquisition, a DC-6, crashed at Schiphol during a "go-around" of a training flight. The plane broke in two pieces and the four people on board were injured.
16 June 1948			0	The KLM DC-4-1009 PH-TCF (named “Friesland”) with 27 people on board from Geneve had a crash during landing at Schiphol. There were no casualties but the plane was lost. The crash was a failure of the pilot and was suspended for two weeks.
24 August 1948			2	A Firefly IV of Valkenburg Airbase crashed onto houses in Valkenburg. The two people on board were killed. Four people on the ground were injured. Several houses were damaged.
26 April 1949			5	A Beechcraft airplane of the KLM Flight Academy crashed about four kilometres from Schiphol Airport near Badhoevedorp. All five people on board, a British and Dutch instructor and three student pilots, died.
29 June 1949			0	A Tiger-Moth training airplane of the “Rijksluchtvaartschool” crashed in the IJsselmeer, near Durgerdam, in an attempt of making an emergency landing. The pilot, the only one on board, survived.
12 May 1950			1	A Firefly F.81 of the Netherlands Naval Aviation Service from Valkenburg Naval Air Base crashed during a test flight in the Leidse Vaart in Haarlem, next to a housing block. The 20-years old pilot was killed. The pilot had his license but had not yet completed his training.
13 January 1953			0	A Fairey Firefly of the Netherlands Naval Aviation Service crashed in Zandvoort at the eastern tunnel of Circuit Zandvoort. The pilot was severe injured.
10 February 1953				An English Sikorsky helicopter crashed in Achthuizen, during North Sea flood of 1953 relief efforts.
6 March 1953				A Douglas C-47 of the Royal Netherlands Air Force crashed at Valkenburg Naval Air Base.
25 May 1953			2	A KLM operated Convair CV-240 (named "Paulus Potter") crashed during take-off down the runway, crossed a road and finally stopped in a field.
16 July 1953			0	An airplane from Soesterberg Air Base crashed. The pilot rescued himself with the parachute. The plane crashed in a pont and the cockpit on railway rails.
12 November 1953				A missing fighter airplane probably crashed in the IJsselmeer.
17 March 1954			2	A Gloster Meteor crashed in the IJsselmeer near Harderwijk. The two people on board were killed.
23 August 1954	KLM Flight 608		21	A KLM operated Douglas DC-6B (named "Willem Bontekoe"), from New York City via Shannon (Ireland) to Amsterdam, crashed near the coast of Bergen. All 21 people on board, including 9 crew members lost their lives.
26 March 1956			1	A Dutch military fighter airplane crashed in Mudflat of the province Groningen, killing the pilot.
28 March 1956			3	A helicopter of the Royal Netherlands Army crashed near Harskamp. Three people on board lost their lives.
11 April 1956			0	A Dutch military fighter airplane crashed into a building of the water authority in Woudenberg.
2 May 1956			1	A Gloster Meteor jet aircraft crashed in Ambt Delden after hitting another, killing the pilot.
3 May 1956			0	A Dutch military fighter airplane crashed in the sea near lighthouse Westhoofd, Ouddorp. The pilot survived using his ejector seat.
18 May 1956			0	Three Republic F-84F Thunderstreak turbojets crashed due to fuel problems. The pilots survived using their ejector seats. A fourth airplane was able to land safely at the last moment at Volkel Airbase.
13 July 1956				A missing fighter airplane probably crashed in the IJsselmeer after fuel problems.
9 August 1956				A missing Hawker Hunter crashed near Ameland.
September 1956	1956 Eindhoven Lockheed T-33 crash		2	A Lockheed T-33 of the Royal Netherlands Air Force crashed in a housing block in Eindhoven. The pilot and one person on the ground were killed. The recently married pilot deliberately ignored his instructions and safety rules and crashed after flying above the house where he lived with his wife.
1 October 1956			0	A North American F-100 Super Sabre from Soesterberg Air Base crashed in the Wilhelmina Canal near Oosterhout. The pilot survived.
14 December 1956			0	A military fighter airplane crashed near Son en Breugel. The pilot survived using his ejector seat. Two farms burned down.
5 February 1957				A foreign military fighter airplane crashed in the IJsselmeer at 11:30 local time, 8 kilometers south-east of Enkhuizen.
14 February 1957			1	A Fairey Firefly training airplane of the Netherlands Naval Aviation Service crashed in Wassenaar. The pilot died.
14 November 1957	1957 Bussum North American F-100 Super Sabre crash		6	An American North American F-100 Super Sabre made a test flight departing from Soesterberg Air Base and crashed at the Kolonel Palmkazerne in Bussum. The pilot survived, but six people were killed on the ground and many more injured.
4 June 1958	Exercise Full Play		0	A Belgian Republic F-84F Thunderstreak had a fatal engine failure. The engine exploded, a fire started and crashed near the church of Hunsel. The pilot survived using his ejector seat.
20 February 1959			0	A Hunter Mark 6 crashes at Soesterberg Air Base and caught fire. The pilot broke his leg.
16 March 1959				A missing Thunderstreak probably crashed in the IJsselmeer or Waddenzee.
1 April 1959				Two Thunderstreak airplanes of Eindhoven Airbase had a mid-air collision around 7 kilometers from Harderwijk. One of the airplanes crashed and the pilot escaped using his parachute.
21 July 1959			0	A Hawker Hunter VII crashed into a farm in Nieuwkoop.
20 November 1960	1960 F-84 Thunderstreak crash		7	A F-84F Thunderstreak of the Royal Netherlands Air Force crashed into a farm in Lutjelollum between Wjelsryp and Franeker. The pilot and the family of six people who lived at the farm were all killed.
24 February 1961				A Sabre collided and crashed.
17 April 1961			0	Two Danish F-86K airplanes that were stationed at the airbase in Twente, crashed while burning in the Betuwe near Elst. Both pilots survived.
28 December 1962			1	The ATL-98 Carvair of Channel Air Bridge from Southend crashed at Rotterdam The Hague Airport. Because there was a layer of snow, the pilot probably misjudged the height of the dike in front of the runway. The nose wheel hit the embankment and the aircraft flipped over just before landing. The pilot lost his life. The 13 passengers survived.
March 1963				https://resolver.kb.nl/resolve?urn=ddd:010568098:mpeg21:a0009
6 May 1963			0	Two F-86K Sabres crashed in midair over Tubbergen. A farm burned down.
14 October 1963			1	Three F-84F Thunderstreak flew in formation. Two of them collided in the air. One of the two exploded, killing the pilot. The other plane crashed while burning and the pilot survived using his ejection seat.
23 January 1965			2	In the night of 23 January 1965, two airplane builders of the Dutch Marine departed without permission with a Lockheed Neptune from Valkenburg Air Base. They crashed in the North Sea 500 metres off the coast of Katwijk. A main search operation started to find the missing people. Their bodies were found in the days following.
28 January 1965			1	A Starfighter of the Belgian Air Component from the Kleine Brogel Air Base exploded in the air near Deurne. The 28-years old pilot from Peer died. Five buildings were damaged.
25 March 1971			2	A British Blackburn Buccaneer, taken off from the English military base Laarbruch, crashed and exploded in open field between Wanssum and Geysteren. The British pilot and navigator were killed.
21 June 1971			2	US Air Force F-4E Phantom II that was stationed at Soesterberg Airbase crashed in Maurik. The two people on board were killed.
21 November 1974			0	A McDonnell Douglas Phantom in UK service type FGR-2 departed from the English airbase Brüggen, just across the Dutch-German border. The aircraft exploded approximately above Roermond, the two people on board were able to rescue themself. The aircraft flew on, while burning, and went from the wooded area 'De Meeren' between Baarlo and Maasbree in the direction of Helden. From a height of a few hundred meters it crashed into the bushes in the hamlet of Het 'Heeske' of Maasbree.
27 August 1980			0	A temporary Soesterberg-based Canadian Starfighter crashed in the sea near Terschelling. The pilot was saved using his ejector seat.
1 October 1980	1980 Venlo Northrop NF-5A plane crash		1	A Northrop NF-5A operated by the Royal Netherlands Air Force crashed on a house in Venlo, the Netherlands. The pilot flew on his own initiative to the place where his parents lived. He crashed after making dangerous maneuvers.
2 June 1981				An F-16 crashed in Lauwersmeer. The pilot escaped with his ejection seat. The pilot died two years later, on 27 April 1983 in another F-16 crash.
6 October 1981	NLM CityHopper Flight 431		17	A Fokker F28 operated by the NLM crashed during a severe thunderstorm at Moerdijk. All 17 on board were killed, including four crew members. The wing was broken by the storm's turbulence.
12 February 1983			4	A Cessna training airplane crashed into the IJsselmeer, near Pampus. The instructor and three people who had their first lesson died.
27 April 1983				Two F-16 airplanes collided above Hoogeveen. These were the 6th and 7th F-16 airplanes that crashed since March 1980. One of the pilot who died, crashed also on 2 June 1981.
25 October 1989			0	A Belgian F-16 crashed near Weert, two kilometres from the Belgian border. The pilot survived using his ejector seat.
21 November 1990				An F-16 fighter jet of the Royal Netherlands Air Force from Twenthe Air Base crashed during a training flight between Dalen and Dalerpeel due to a technical malfunction at a high altitude. The pilot survived using his ejector seat.
4 October 1992	El Al Flight 1862		43	A Boeing 747 cargo aircraft of the then-state-owned Israeli airline El Al, crashed into two flats in the Bijlmermeer (colloquially "Bijlmer") neighbourhood (part of Amsterdam-Zuidoost) of Amsterdam. 43 people died.
9 August 1993				A F-16 of Volkel Airbase crashed at a corn field near the base, possibly due to a bird in the engine. The pilot survived using his parachute. It was the 29th Dutch F-16 crash since 1980.
4 April 1994	KLM Cityhopper Flight 433		3	A KLM Cityhopper operated Saab 340B crashed during an emergency landing killing 3 occupants, including the captain, caused by inadequate pilot training and faulty failure sensor, leading to loss of control during go-around.
15 July 1996	1996 Belgian Air Force Hercules accident		34	A Belgian Lockheed C-130 Hercules aircraft crashed at Eindhoven Airport and resulted in the death of 34 passengers. The incident is known as the "Hercules disaster" (Dutch: Herculesramp) in the Netherlands and Belgium.
25 September 1996	1996 Texel Douglas DC-3 crash		32	A historic Douglas DC-3 of the Dutch Dakota Association crashed near Texel. All 32 people on board lost their lives.
18 September 1997			1	A Robinson R22-B helicopter was stolen from Haren Airport in Diest, Belgium and appeared above the penitentiary in Sittard where a number of detainees were being ventilated at that time. The pilot descended over the courtyard and threw out a firearm. Then the pilot turned the helicopter around, flew to another corner of the courtyard and turned north. Hovering at a height of approximately 6 metres, the tailplane struck a light tower, upon which the helicopter tilted to the right and crashed to the ground. A fire broke out. The pilot was killed.
31 October 1997			2	An amateur construction aircraft Cherry BX2 crashed into a residential area in Middelburg. Both people on board were killed and the aircraft was completely destroyed.
20 December 1997			1	A KLM ERA Sikorsky S-76B helicopter crashed on 20 December 1997 near Den Helder into the water. All of the occupants were evacuated from the helicopter, and after approximately ten minutes, the aircraft sank. After approximately one hour a supply vessel took the crew and passengers on board. One passenger died shortly after evacuating the aircraft.
13 June 1998				During a simulated emergency landing of a high wing aircraft at Hilversum Airport, the plane had a mid-air collision with a plane that made a normal approach, about 50 meters before runway. Both aircraft hit crashed and were destroyed.
22 December 1999			2	Three F16 planes flew in formation at a low altitude. One of the three collided with a PA-28 from Seppe airplane. Two people of the PA-28 died. The pilot of the F16 escaped using his ejection seat and survived.
8 June 2000			3	Two Beechcraft Bonanza A36 airplanes of the KLM Aviation School, coming from Groningen Airport Eelde, collided near Smilde. The accident was caused because during the unauthorized formation flight the pilot of the PH-BWD suddenly initiated a climbing left turn and the pilot of the PH-BWC did not (or could not) respond adequately to this. The PH-BWC crashed and the three occupants were killed. Following the impact, the PH-BWD's instructor made an emergency landing. Two occupants of the PH-BWD were seriously injured. Both aircraft were damaged beyond repair. The underlying cause is the lack of proper safety management and culture at the KLS.
25 February 2009	Turkish Airlines flight 1951		9	A Boeing 737–800 operated by the Turkish Airlines crashed before landing at Schiphol Airport in a field just before the Polderbaan. Nine people died and 86 were injured.
16 October 2009			2	Shortly after take-off from Budel Airport the aircraft crashed near a farm. The two people who were on board died and the aircraft was destroyed.
27 June 2010	Heli Holland EC130 accident	4		
2 August 2011			1	A Yakovlev Yak-52 flew close behind another aircraft during the final approach at Lelystad Airport. To create more space, the pilot wanted to make a 360-degree turn. During this manoeuvre, the aircraft stalled and crashed. The driver died and the plane was destroyed.
4 May 2012			0	A Ruschmeyer R 90 crashed at Eindhoven airport. The four people on board were injured, including the pilot being severe injured. The aircraft was destroyed.
15 September 2012			0	An Aero L-39 Albatros flew in a formation of seven airplanes en route from Den Helder Airport to Kleine Brogel Air Base in Belgium. Near Valkenswaard, the pilot experienced engine problems, after which he and the other occupant left the aircraft using the ejection seats, and survived unharmed. The aircraft crashed in a field and was destroyed.
19 March 2014			2	An Extra EA-300 crashed during an aerobatic flight near Bussloo and was completely destroyed. Both people on board were killed.
4 January 2016			1	A Cirrus SR20 on route from Gloucestershire, United Kingdom to Osnabruck Atterheide, Germany. The airplane disappeared off the Dutch coast from air traffic control radar. Parts of the aircraft have been found in the North Sea. The accident is believed to have been caused by the aircraft stalling after the pilot became disoriented due to poor visibility.
9 June 2016			0	A Northrop F-5 of the Swiss Air Force crashed near a pond, not far from the village of Beetgum near Leeuwarden Airbase and caught fire. The plane was in Leeuwarden because of the Air Force Days. The pilot saved himself with the ejector seat and fell through the glass of a greenhouse complex.
15 June 2020			1	An American F-15C Eagle crashed in the North Sea.
20 February 2021	Longtail Aviation Flight 5504		0	A Boeing 747-400(BCF) cargo plane suffered an engine failure shortly after departure that caused debris to fall to the ground near the Dutch town of Meerssen. Two people on the ground were slightly injured and there was property damage to buildings and cars.

== World War II ==
During World War II around 6000 airplanes crashed in the Netherlands, both on land and in the water. In September 2019, a special multi-year project started, to recover dozens of plane wrecks with missing crew members. The Royal Netherlands Air Force is leading the recovery operation. The Salvage and Identification Service of the Royal Netherlands Army collects as many remains as possible and tries to identify them. The Defense Explosive Ordnance Disposal Service is present to secure weapons, ammunition and bombs. It was planned to recover 3 wrecks per year.

Date	Image	Deaths	Description
11 May 1940			A Fokker D.XXI guided on 11 May 1940 a Fokker T.V. bombing airplane. After it misses its target at Maasbruggen, de convoy came into contact with twenty Germen Messerschmitt BF-100 airplanes during their return. Three chased the Fokker D.XXI. Pilot Roos throw away the roof of the cockpit to jump out of the plane. However, the roof hit a wing and propeller of a German plane that crashed. Roos started hiding in a clowd. After flying away hè shot down two German “Messerschmitt” airplanes. However, he was hit later and crashed in Nieuwkoop, the pilot survived.
13 June 1941		6	A bomber of the RAF crashed at Zwaagdijk. The six crew members were killed. In 1966 the wreck was excavated.
17 December 1942		6	A Lancaster bomber (W-4126-KR) was on its way to an oil refinery in Nienburg, Germany. The aircraft was shot down by German naval anti-aircraft fire above Den Hoorn. Six of the seven crew members were killed (3 British, 2 Canadian, 1 Southern Rhodesian). One British crew member managed to escape by parachute and was taken as a prisoner of war.
12 June 1943		7	In the night of 12 June 1943, a Lancaster of the Royal Australian Air Force was shot down by German night fighter. The bomber was returning from a bombing raid on the city of Düsseldorf to its home base in Binbrook, England. All seven crew members were killed.
13 June 1943		3	A Halifax bomber (DK183 ZL-S) had to bomb Bochum, as part of the Battle of the Ruhr where 503 bombers were involved in. Due to an engine failure the aircraft returned early. It was shot down above Den Hoorn by a German night fighter. Three Canadian crew members died. The three other British and one Canadian members became a prisoner of war.
23 November 1943		7	A Lancaster bomber (JA932 MG-M) had to bomb Berlin, as part of the Battle of Berlin where 283 airplanes were involved in. On its way back home it was shot down above Oudeschild by a German night fighter. All seven crew members died (5 British, 1 Canadian, 1 New Zealand).
15 January 1944		5	A Lancaster bomber (ND 421 OF-S) from RAF Bourn was involved in an attack on Braunschweig together with 498 planes. After 40 miles they were seen on the radar. German night fighters took of from Leeuwarden Airbase and shot down 38 planes. This plane was shot down at 20:35 local time above in Nienburg, Germany. The aircraft was shot down by German naval anti-aircraft fire above Texel. Five British crew members died, two others saves them using their parachute and became prisoners of war.
21 February 1944		8	1944 Zegveld Boeing B-17 Flying Fortress crash — An American B17 bomber crashed in Zegveld. Eight of the ten people on board died. In 2015 a memorial was placed.
15 August 1944		5	A Lancaster, piloted by Canadian Jakeman is taken down by German anti-aircraft fire above Soesterberg Air Base. Five of the seven people on board were killed.
9 September 1944		3	A Short Stirling (LK200 NF-J) went to Spanbroek with on board secret agents and weapons for the resistance. On its way back it flew against a cable of a cable balloon and had to make an emergency landing. During the landing the plane was completely destroyed, 3 crew members died and four others became prisoners of war.
12 September 1944		1	A Bristol Beaufighter (NE 746, MB-Q) with two occupants was together with 38 other Beaufighters involved in attacking a convoy in the harbor of Den Helder and the Marsdiep. The plane was hit multiple times by anti-aircraft guns and exploded in the air above Texel. The British crew member died. The crew member from New Zealand became a prisoner of war.
19 September 1944			After an attack on Bremen, British bombing airplane Mosquito B.XX KB267 including pilot in the Royal Air Force Guy Gibson crashed at Steenbergen at around 22:30 and lit up in flames. Witnesses heard an aircraft flying low, saw that its cockpit was illuminated and then it crashed.
19 September 1944		7	During the Battle of Arnhem, the British 1st Airborne Division was in desperate need of supplies. Lord's Douglas Dakota III "KG374" encountered intense enemy anti-aircraft fire and was twice hit, with one engine burning. Lord managed to drop his supplies, but at the end of the run found that there were two containers remaining. Although he knew that one of his wings might collapse at any moment, he nevertheless made a second run to drop the last supplies, then ordered his crew to bail out. A few seconds later, the Dakota crashed in flames with its Irish transport pilot David Lord and six crew members.
5 October 1944		0	An American B17G bomber (43-37744) call sign “Final Approach” left formation under control en route to target Handorf Airfield near Münster and was attacked by a German flak battery near Overbroek, fouling multiple engines. The crew bailed out and the aircraft crashed near the Oosterbosweg street in Castenray. All of the crew survived the incident and were almost immediately taken as prisoners of war.
6 December		0	Ouddorp: Successful emergency landing of an American B-17 bomber ('Mr. Tacoma' 43-3794). At site is a large information plaque about it.
3 April 1945		8	An American B17G bomber (43-38992) and was involved in bombing a submarine base in Kiel. On its way back it was hit by anti-aircraft fire. Two engines were hit, caught fire and crashed at Den Hoorn. Of the ten American crew members, three escaped using their parachute. One of them remained at the tail end of the plane and died during the crash together with the seven other crew members. The two others landed in the Wadden Sea and became prisoners of war in Texel.
5 April 1945		10	Ouddorp: 10 Bates-crew of the 490th Bomb Group, 850th Bomb Squadron died. At the disaster site is a large information plaque to commemorate the crash.
