= 1943 Bodegraven Martin B-26 Marauder crashes =

1943 aviation accidents during WWII

1943 Bodegraven Martin B-26 Marauder mid-air collision
Occurrence
- Date: 17 May 1943 (11:58 AM local time)
- Summary: Mid-air collision
- Site: Noordzijderpolder and Meijepolder, Bodegraven, Netherlands

Aircraft
- Aircraft type: Martin B-26 Marauder
- Operator: United States Army Air Forces
- Fatalities: 8
- Injuries: 4
- Survivors: 4 (crash site), 6 (captured)

The 1943 Bodegraven Martin B-26 Marauder mid-air collision occurred on 17 May 1943, when two Martin B-26 Marauder bombers of the United States Army Air Forces collided mid-air above the Dutch town of Bodegraven during World War II. The crash, which killed eight crew members and injured four others, became the deadliest war-related incident in Bodegraven. A third bomber made a forced landing nearby and its crew were taken prisoner.

== Background ==
On May 14, 1943, the first low-level bombing raid over Western Europe was conducted, flying at an altitude of approximately 15 meters above sea level and 150 meters above land. The objective of the mission was to disable electrical power plants in the western Netherlands, including those located in Haarlem and Velsen. The operation achieved only partial success, prompting a follow-up mission.

== Mission and aircraft crashes ==
This low-level bombing raid over Western Europe took place on 17 May and was carried out by eleven B-26 Marauder bombers of the 452nd Bomb Squadron part of the 322nd Bomb Group of the United States Army Air Forces, involving a total of 66 crew members. The aircraft took off at 11:00 a.m. from Bury St. Edmunds airfield in England. Shortly after takeoff, one of the bombers experienced technical difficulties and was forced to abort the mission. This aircraft climbed to an altitude of 1,000 feet to enable a glide return; however due to its higher altitude it was detected by German radar.

The formation was originally scheduled to cross the Dutch coast near Noordwijk. In an effort to avoid flying over German naval vessels, the bombers initially flew further south over the water. However, strong winds and the limited precision of the navigational instruments caused the formation to enter the Netherlands south of Hoek van Holland, rather than at the planned entry point. At 11:52 a.m., the aircraft piloted by Lieutenant Colonel Steelman was shot down near Rosenburg. One minute later, a second bomber was downed near Maassluis and crashed into the River Maas.

Following these losses, the remaining aircraft attempted to re-form their formation. During this maneuver, two bombers at around 11:58 collided over the Noordzijderpolder and crashed into nearby fields, scattering debris across the countryside. A third aircraft made an emergency landing in the Meijepolder near De Meije after being struck by debris.

A local eyewitness, J.G. Stolwijk, described hearing loud engine noise and witnessing the aircraft crashing behind a farm near the Vredehof Cemetery: "Everything burned like a torch. I saw the fuselages and wings... it was deadly silent. Suddenly, I saw movement on a wing, but it broke off and the man disappeared in the flames."

The five remaining aircraft flew to, what they thought, IJmuiden. They mistook the Zuidergasfabriek in Amsterdam for the IJmuiden power plant which they then bombed. During the way back to the England, three of the bombers were hit near the coast by anti-aircraft guns and crashed into the sea. German fighters who had taken off from Woensdrecht air base shot down above the North Sea the remaining two bombers 60km west from IJmuiden.

== Victims ==
=== Bodegraven ===
Of the two aircraft that crashed in Bodegraven, eight American airmen died and four others were injured. The injured people were taken to a nearby farm, where they received initial care from the local branch of the Red Cross. They were later transferred to the St. Joseph Hospital in Gouda. The six crew members of the aircraft that crash-landed in the Meije were captured and held as prisoners of war. Of those hospitalized, only one survived the war.

The names of the eight fallen crew members:

- William Converse, 24
- Berton H. Ramsey Jr., 24
- Arthur E. Garni, 21
- Kenneth B. Von Lindern, 25
- James D. Thompson, 22
- Frank Lamonica, 23
- Richard O. Wolfe, 21
- Jack E. Vandergrift, 24

=== North sea ===
Of the two aircraft that were taken down by the German fighters, two people were found five days later alive in the North Sea.

== Memorial and remembrance ==
In August 1945, the local Red Cross proposed a memorial to be placed at the Vredehof Cemetery in honor of the eight American airmen. The plan was endorsed by then-mayor Cornelis Simon van Dobben de Bruijn. However, the monument was never realized; until 80 years later.

Thanks to the efforts of three local historians of the Stichting 4 mei Herdenking (4 May Remembrance Foundation), the idea was revived. Their research for a documentary titled Zwarte maandag – 17 mei 1943 ("Black Monday – 17 May 1943") uncovered forgotten correspondence about the original memorial plan.

On 17 May 2025, a memorial plaque was unveiled at the end of the Vredehof Cemetery, overlooking the site of the crash. The unveiling ceremony included speeches by foundation chairman Eric Bette, American chargé d'affaires Marcus Micheli and mayor Michiel Grauss. Two historic aircraft performed a flyby at 11:58 AM, the time of the original crash, followed by a bugle call and a moment of silence.

In Bodegraven an audio tour can be booked in an army truck that visits the site of the disaster.

== See also ==
- 1944 Zegveld Boeing B-17 Flying Fortress crash
