= MBQ =

MBQ, MBq, mBq, or mbq can refer to:

== Science ==
- Megabecquerel (SI symbol MBq), a unit of ionizing radiation exposure, being a million becquerels
- Millibecquerel (SI symbol mBq), another unit of ionizing radiation exposure, being a thousandth of a becquerel
- Mebroqualone (MBQ), a sedative, a quinazolinone-class GABAergic, an analogue of mecloqualone
- Acanthophyllum (Catalogue of Life identifier MBQ), a genus of flowering plants

== Transportation ==
- Mbarara Airport (IATA airport code MBQ), an airport in Mbarara, Uganda
- Mumbra railway station (station code MBQ), a train station in Mumbra, Maharashtra, India

== Other uses ==
- MBQ (manga), an English-language manga running from 2005 to 2007.
- Maisin language (ISO 639 language code mbq), a language spoken in Papua New Guinea
- Mohawks of the Bay of Quinte First Nation (MBQ), an indigenous tribe from Hastings County, Ontario, Canada
- MB-Q, a flight of Bristol Beaufighters in 1944; see List of aviation accidents and incidents in the Netherlands

== See also ==
- microbecquerel (μBq)
- 1000 Bq, see kilobecquerel (kBq)
