= Roland van Benthem =

Dutch politician and former civil servant

Roland van Benthem (born 24 February 1968 in Emmeloord) is a Dutch politician and former civil servant. Being a member of the People's Party for Freedom and Democracy (Volkspartij voor Vrijheid en Democratie) he currently is mayor of Eemnes.

== Biography ==
Educated as a Chartered Accountant Van Benthem worked for the Tax and Customs Administration, at the Ministry of Finance as well as the Ministry of Foreign Affairs and at the Queen's Office.

From 1994 to 2005 he was a councillor of Zeist, which is a municipality of the province of Utrecht. From 2004 to 2007 he was a member of the States-Provincial of the province of Utrecht. On 1 September 2005 he became mayor of Eemnes, which also is a municipality of the province of Utrecht.

Being homosexual he was treasurer of LGBT organization COC Nederland from 2001 to 2004.

Married since 2017.

== Decorations ==
- Member of the Order of Orange-Nassau, 2007
