= Max Christern =

Dutch-born German aviator of Swedish descent (1923–1946)

Max Wilhelm Douwe Christern (7 May 1923 – 7 October 1946) was a Dutch-born German aviator of Swedish descent. During World War II he fled by plane to avoid conscription and became a pilot at the Royal Air Force and after the war at the Royal Netherlands Air Force. On 7 October 1946 he caused the 1946 Apeldoorn aircraft crash killing himself and 22 school children.

== Biography ==
Christenen was born on 7 May 1923 in Vorden. Christern was of Swedish descent and had the German citizenship. He was the son of a German father and a Dutch mother and had one older sister and a younger brother. After the death of his father the family moved in the 1930s from Manila, Philippines to Berg en Bos in Apeldoorn in the Netherlands where Christern grew up.

Christern played field hockey and loved gliding and also motor flying. At the age of 16 years old he made a glider flight from Teuge of 100 kilometers.

Due to the German invasion of the Netherlands, he didn't get the Dutch nationality. As being a Reich German, Christern was called up during World War II for service in the German army. In an attempt for desertion he applied for pilot training, as he was already interested in aviation from a young age. As a pilot-in-training, he managed to get hold of a plane and flew from the Russian front towards England. However, due to lack of fuel he was forced to land in the Netherlands. He was able to go into hiding and took as name Menno Kannegieter. In May 1944, still during the War, he was arrested during a control and imprisoned. He managed to escape Kamp Amersfoort in August and moved to the surroundings of Nijmegen. After the liberation of Brabant, Christen was able to move to Eindhoven, where he was able in March 1945 to registered at the British Royal Air Force. He went to England to train to become a pilot. After his training, Christern was deployed as a scout. When the Netherlands was liberated, Christern signed-up at the Royal Netherlands Air Force and was stationed at Valkenburg where he had the rank of sergeant-flyer. In 1946 he would move with the HNLMS Karel Doorman (R81) to the Dutch East Indies. After his positive result of the "tropical inspection" he made on 7 October 1946 his first solo flight with the Fairey Firefly. He was given the order to fly in the neighbourhood of the air base to become familiar with the aircraft and then return to the airbase. However, he flew to Apeldoorn where his mother lived. In Apeldoorn he made some dives above the market square. Afterwards he flew in the direction where his mother lived. Christern was flying very low, and probably saw the school tower of the Hogere Burgerschool too late. With an extreme maneuver he managed to avoid the tower, but his right wing touched the left corner of the school building. The wing broke off, tearing open the fuel tank at the bottom of the wing. The fuel tank fell on the roof of the gym and burning fuel flowed into the gym with 27 children and a teacher. 22 of them lost their lives. Christern crashed with his airplane into the trees right behind the school building and died. His mother died from a heart attack after she was told her son was killed. Christern and his mother Maria Christern-Slingervoet Ramondt were cremated in Driehuis. Next to family and relatives, the cremation was attended by many colleagues. One of the speakers was the naval chaplain who spoke on behalf of the Commander of the Royal Netherlands Navy.
