= Zegveld =

- Town
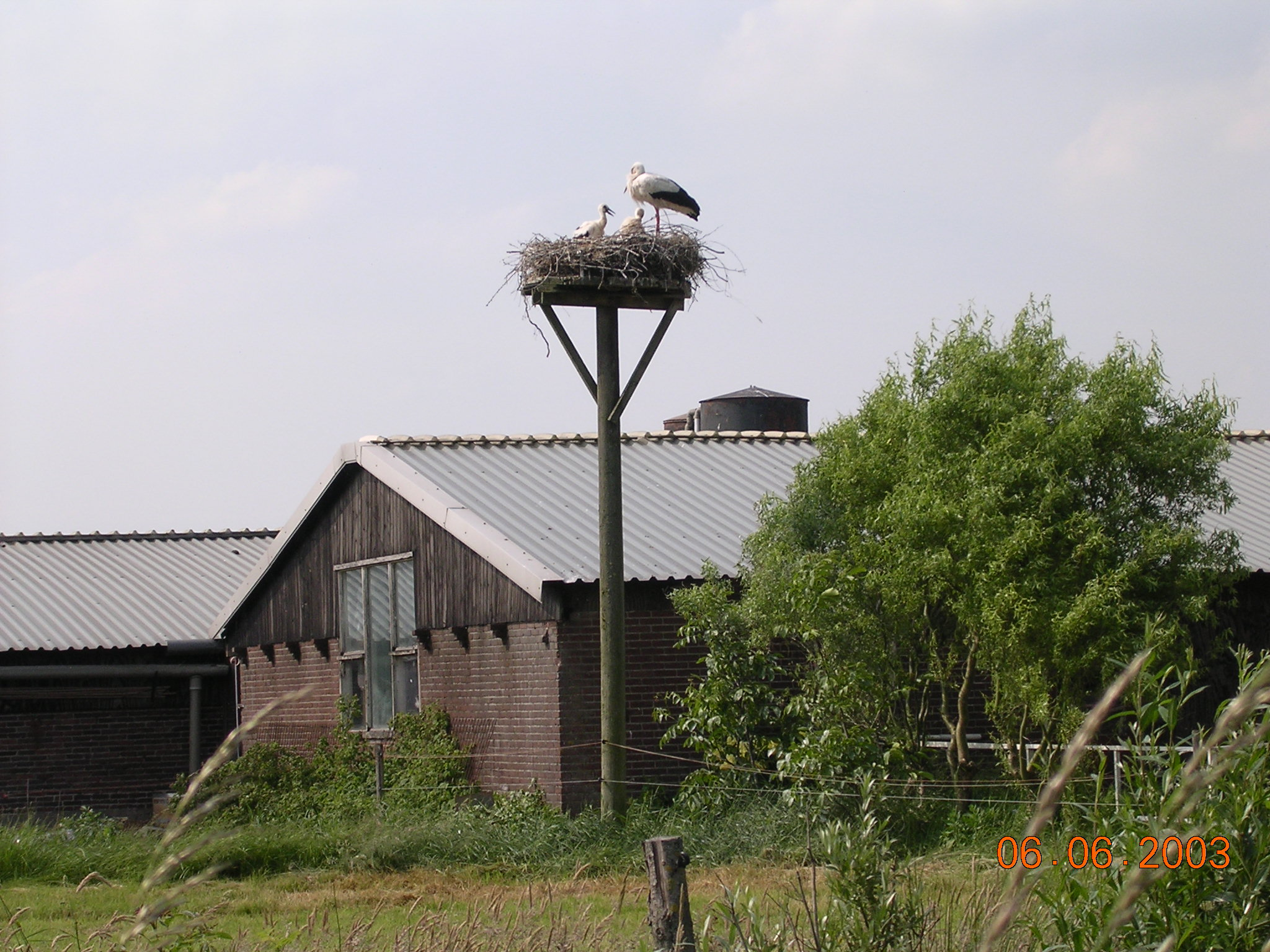
- Ooievaarsdorp in Zegveld

- Flag Coat of arms

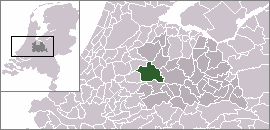

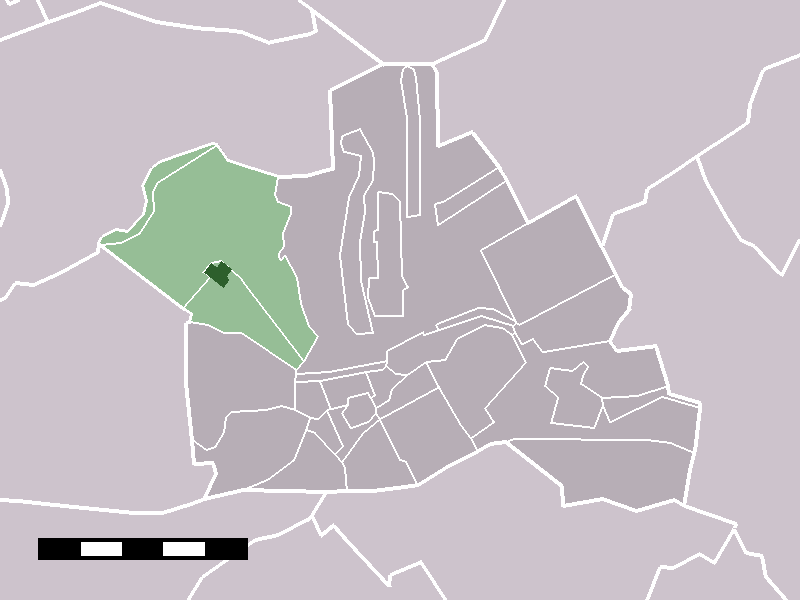
- The village (dark green) and statistical district (light green) of Zegveld in the municipality of Woerden.
- Coordinates: 52°6′58″N 4°50′5″E
- Country: Netherlands
- Province: Utrecht
- Municipality: Woerden

Population (1 January 2010)
  - Total: 2,348
- Time zone: UTC+1 (CET)
  - Summer (DST): UTC+2 (CEST)

Zegveld is a village in the Dutch province of Utrecht. It is a part of the municipality of Woerden and lies about 5 km northwest of Woerden.

In 2001 the town of Zegveld had 1,576 inhabitants. The built-up area of the town was 0.21 km^{2}, and contained 563 residences. The statistical district "Zegveld" has a population of around 2360. This covers the entire former municipality, including the hamlets of Lagebroek and Stichtse Meije.

== White storks ==
The village has a center for white storks to nest, a unique place in the area.

== History ==
The village used to be a separate municipality. In 1989, it merged with Woerden. Unlike Woerden, Zegveld was always a part of the province of Utrecht.

During World War II an American Boeing B-17 Flying Fortress crashed in 1944 near the village.
