= Clément van Maasdijk =

Dutch aviation pioneer (1885–1910)

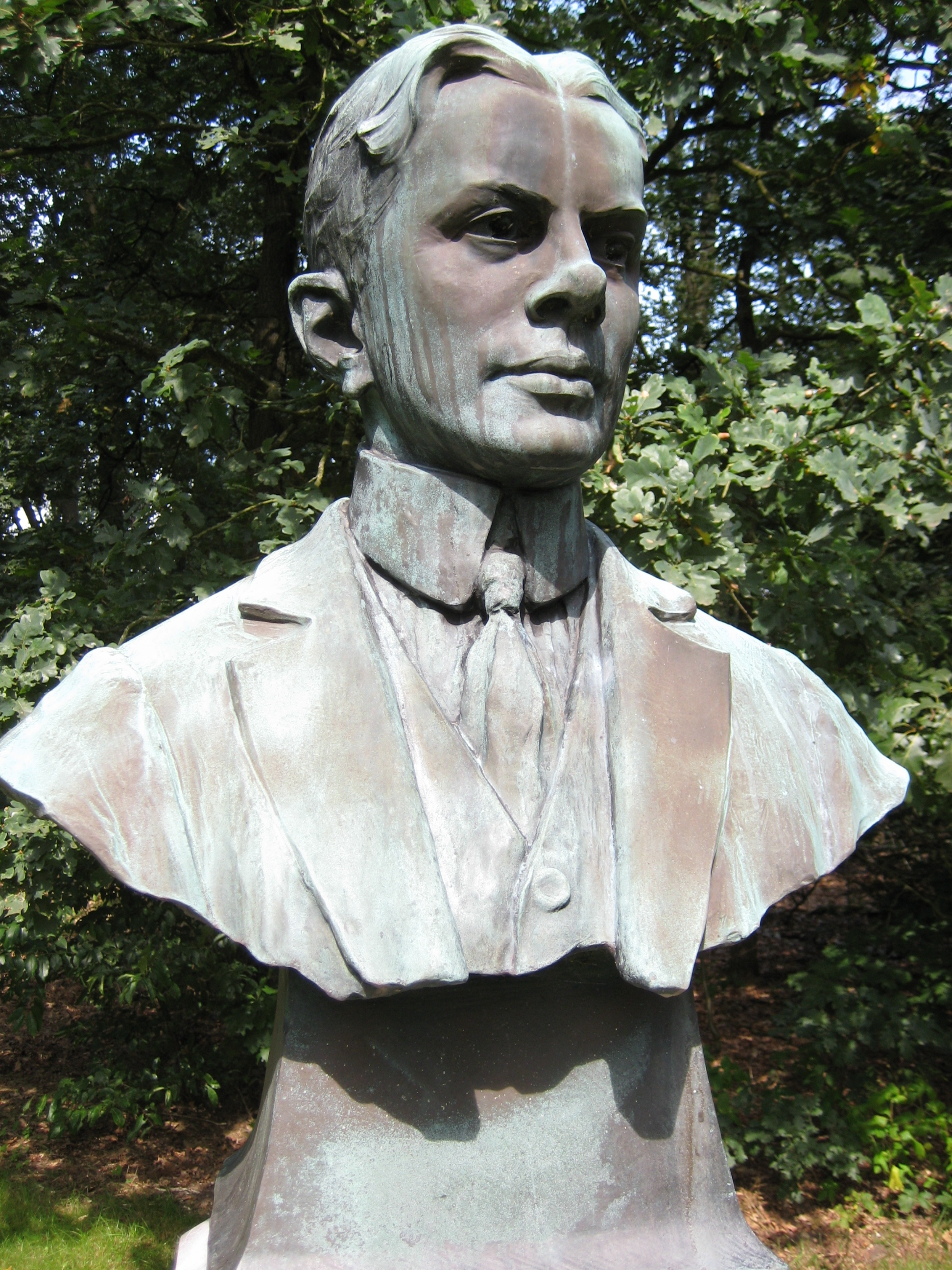
- Bronze memorial in Schaarsbergen (1911) by August Falise
- Born: Clément Guillaume Jean van Maasdijk; 8 September 1885; The Hague, Netherlands
- Died: 27 August 1910 (aged 24); Arnhem, Netherlands
- Occupation: Aviator
- Known for: First Dutch aviation fatality

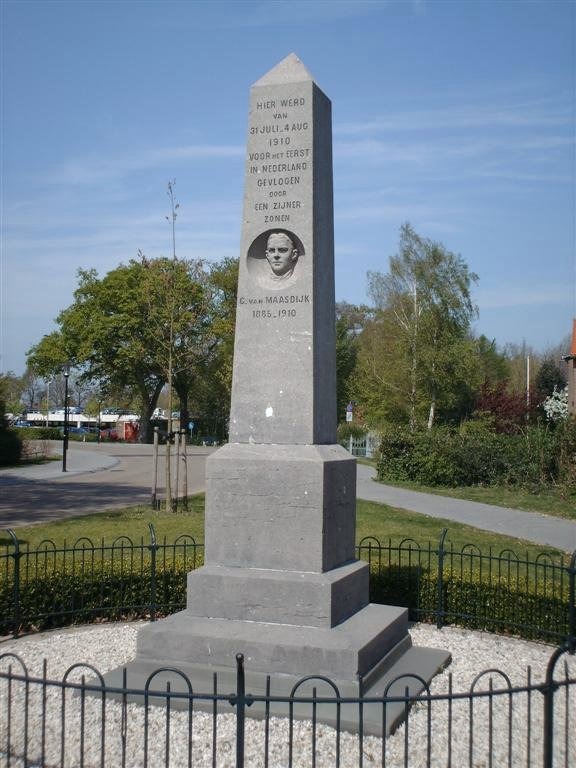
Memorial in Heerenveen

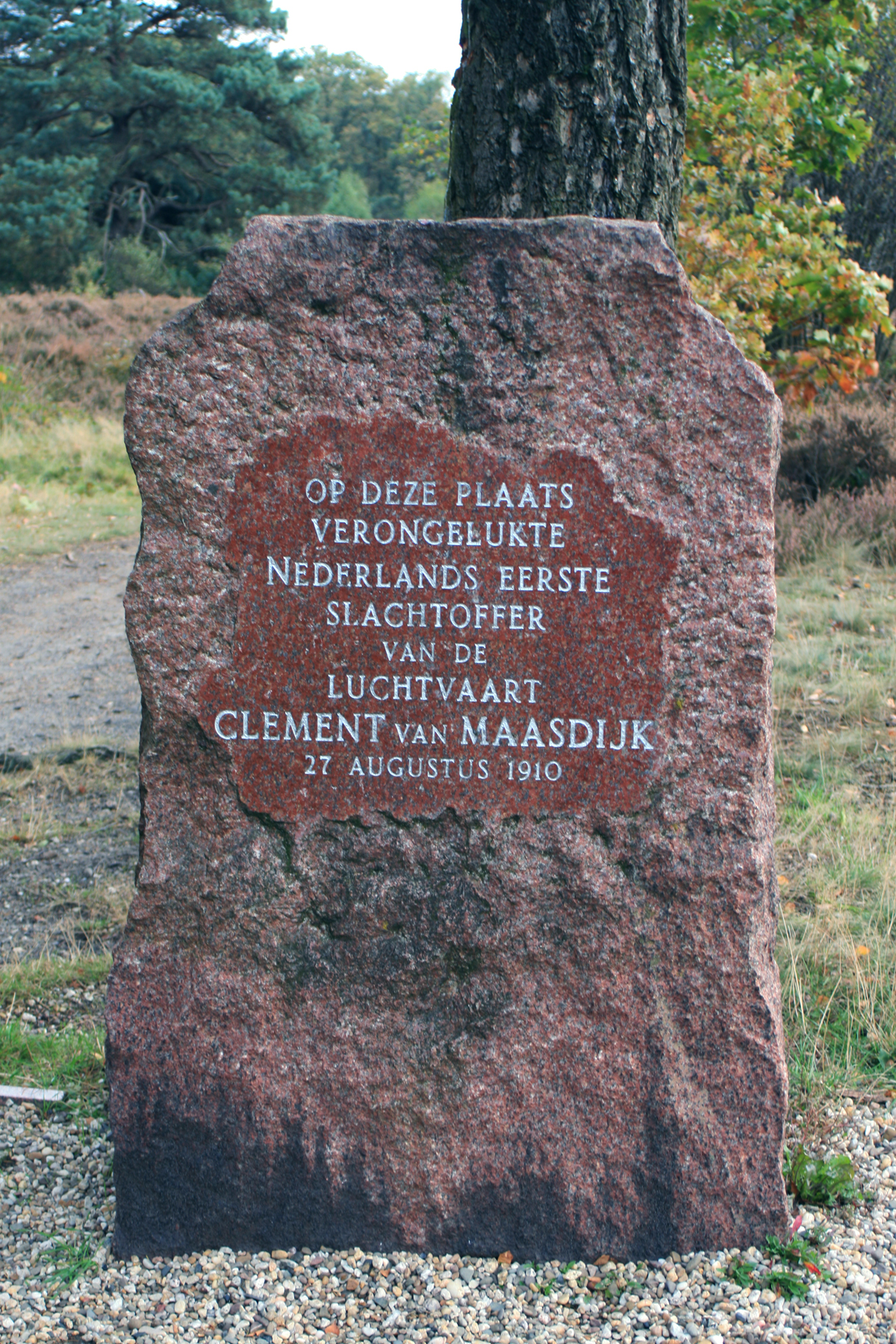
Location of his fatal accident

Clément Guillaume Jean van Maasdijk (8 September 1885 – 27 August 1910) was a Dutch aviation pioneer and the first Dutchman to die in an aviation accident in the Netherlands.

== Biography ==
=== Early life and inspiration ===
Van Maasdijk was born in The Hague, Netherlands. In 1909, he witnessed a flight demonstration by French aviator Hubert Latham, which inspired him to pursue aviation. He traveled to France to become a pilot, and obtained his license after recovering from an early crash during training.

=== Aviation career ===
Returning to the Netherlands in 1910, Van Maasdijk began conducting public flight demonstrations. He aimed to be the first to fly over Dutch soil, but this achievement was narrowly claimed by Johan Hilgers. Nevertheless, Van Maasdijk's flight in Heerenveen attracted over 4,000 spectators. Later that month, he gave a demonstration in The Hague, although poor weather disrupted the event.

=== Death ===
On 27 August 1910, Van Maasdijk would give a demonstration during the 1910 flight week in Arnhem. During a test flight in a French-built Sommer biplane, the aircraft crashed on the Warnsborn heath in Schaarsbergen in front of his fiancée and officials. He died instantly, becoming the first aviation fatality in Dutch history.

== Legacy ==
Van Maasdijk was buried at Moscowa Cemetery in Arnhem. In 1911, a bust was erected in his honor in Schaarsbergen. Although it was stolen in 1986, it was later recovered and relocated near the village church.

A memorial stone, known as the "Heitje van Maasdijk", now marks the crash site.

Another monument, designed by Pier Pander, stands at the end of Van Maasdijkstraat in Heerenveen to commemorate his historic flight.
