= 1946 Apeldoorn Fairey Firefly crash =

Airplane crash on a school

1946 Apeldoorn aircraft crash
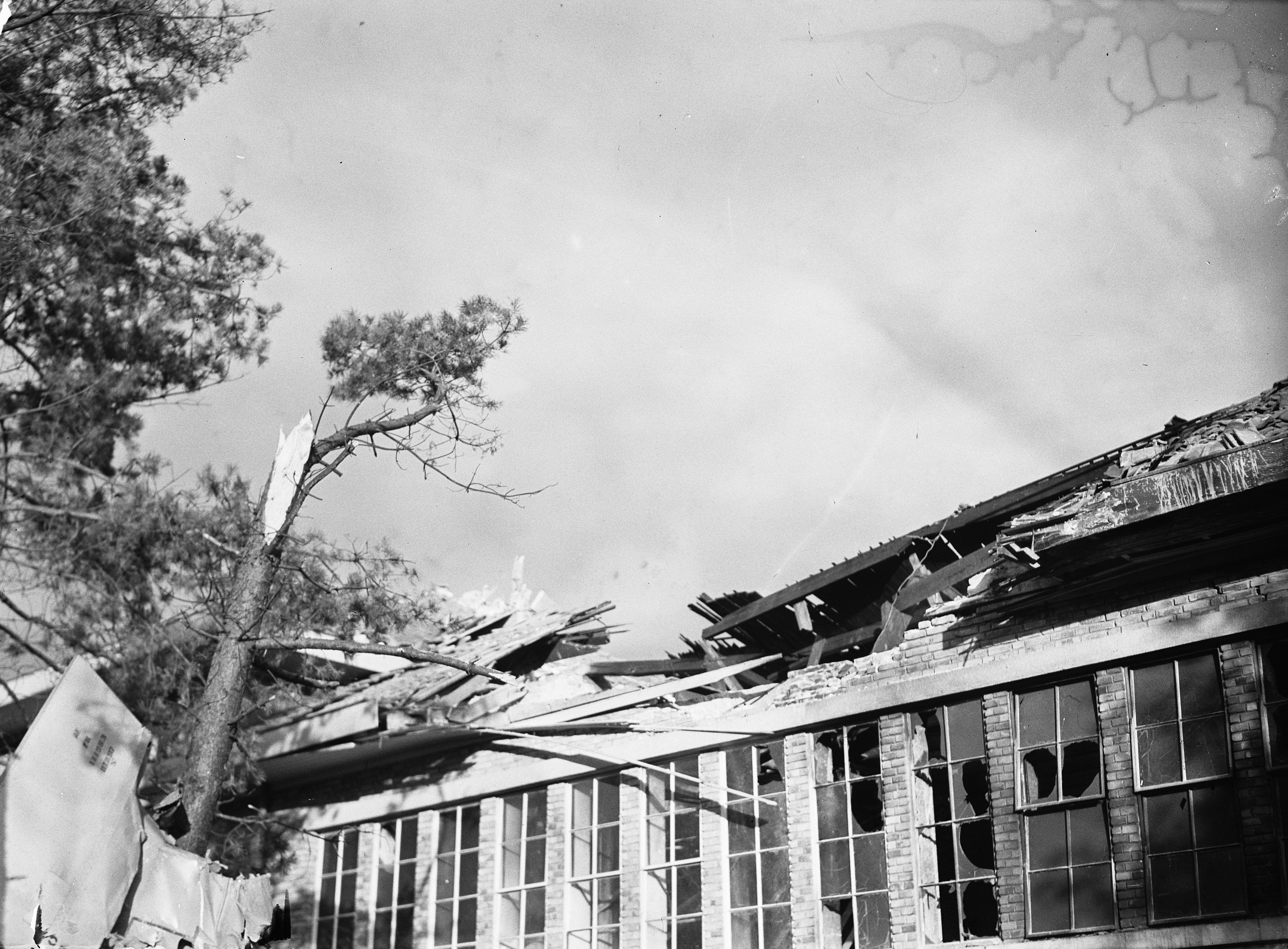
- The damaged gym of the Hogere Burgerschool in Apeldoorn after the crash with in the bottom left corner a piece of the Fairey Firefly FR.1

Accident
- Date: 7 October 1946
- Summary: Loss of control
- Site: Apeldoorn, Netherlands
- Total fatalities: 23
- Total injuries: 4
- Total survivors: 0

Aircraft
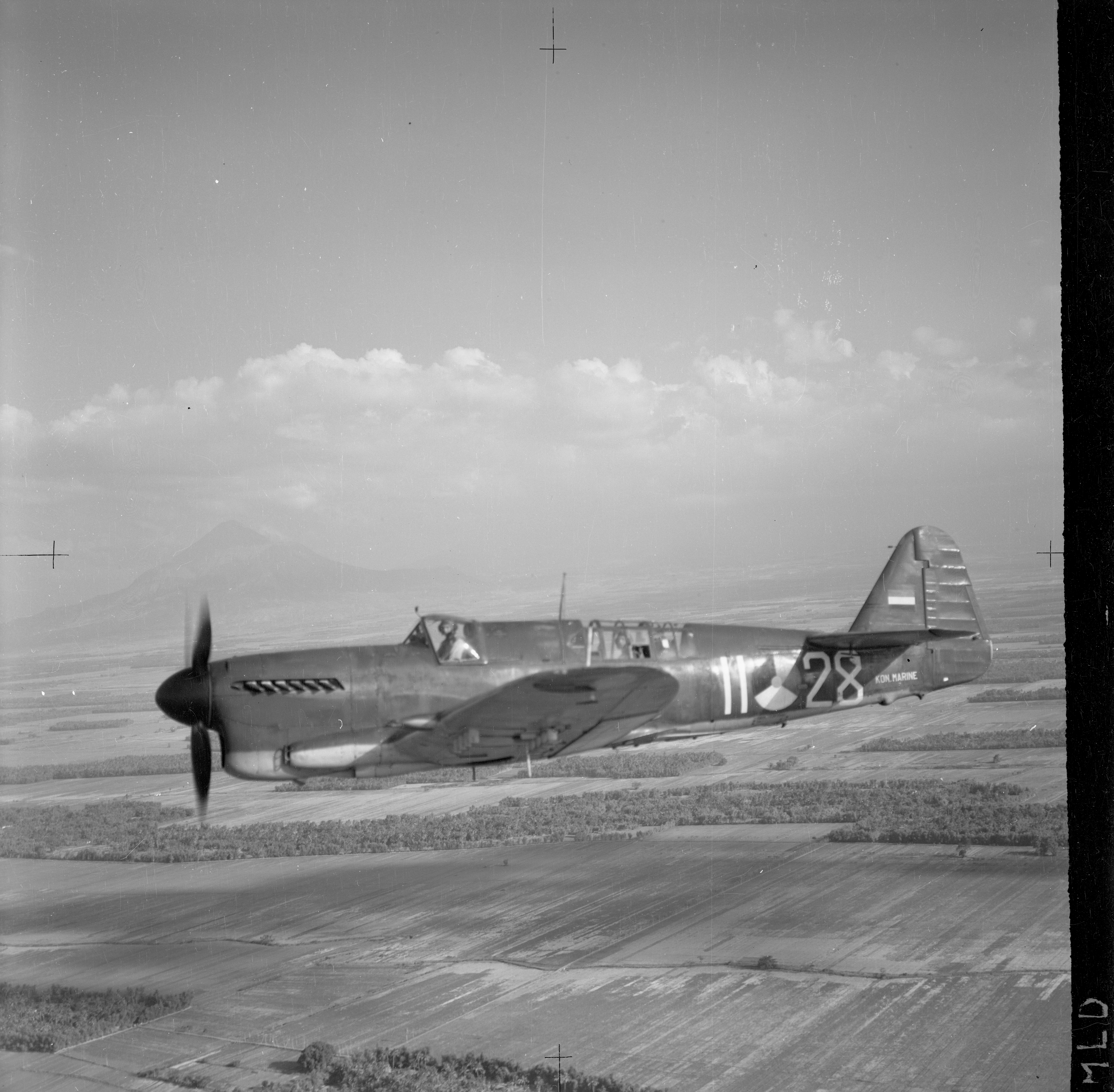
- Fairey Firefly FR.1 of the Netherlands Naval Aviation Service
- Aircraft type: Fairey Firefly FR.1
- Operator: Netherlands Naval Aviation Service
- Registration: F-15
- Flight origin: Valkenburg Naval Air Base
- Destination: Valkenburg Naval Air Base
- Occupants: 1
- Crew: 1
- Fatalities: 1
- Survivors: 0

Ground casualties
- Ground fatalities: 22
- Ground injuries: 4

On 7 October 1946, a Fairey Firefly FR.1 of the Netherlands Naval Aviation Service crashed next to the Hogere Burgerschool in Apeldoorn, the Netherlands. The burning fuel tank fell into the gym where 27 students were at the time. Of the 27 students, 22 lost their lives, together with the pilot Max Christern. The pilot's mother died of a heart attack later that day, after she arrived at the scene of the crash and was told about his fate.

== Background ==
The Netherlands Naval Aviation Service had bought 30 British Fairey Firefly planes. The plane is known to be fast, easily maneuverable and has a powerful Rolls-Royce engine. Fifteen of these planes arrived in the Netherlands after a journey of months aboard the aircraft carrier Karel Doorman. The planes would be used at Morokrembagan base on Java, Dutch East Indies.

== Flight and crash ==
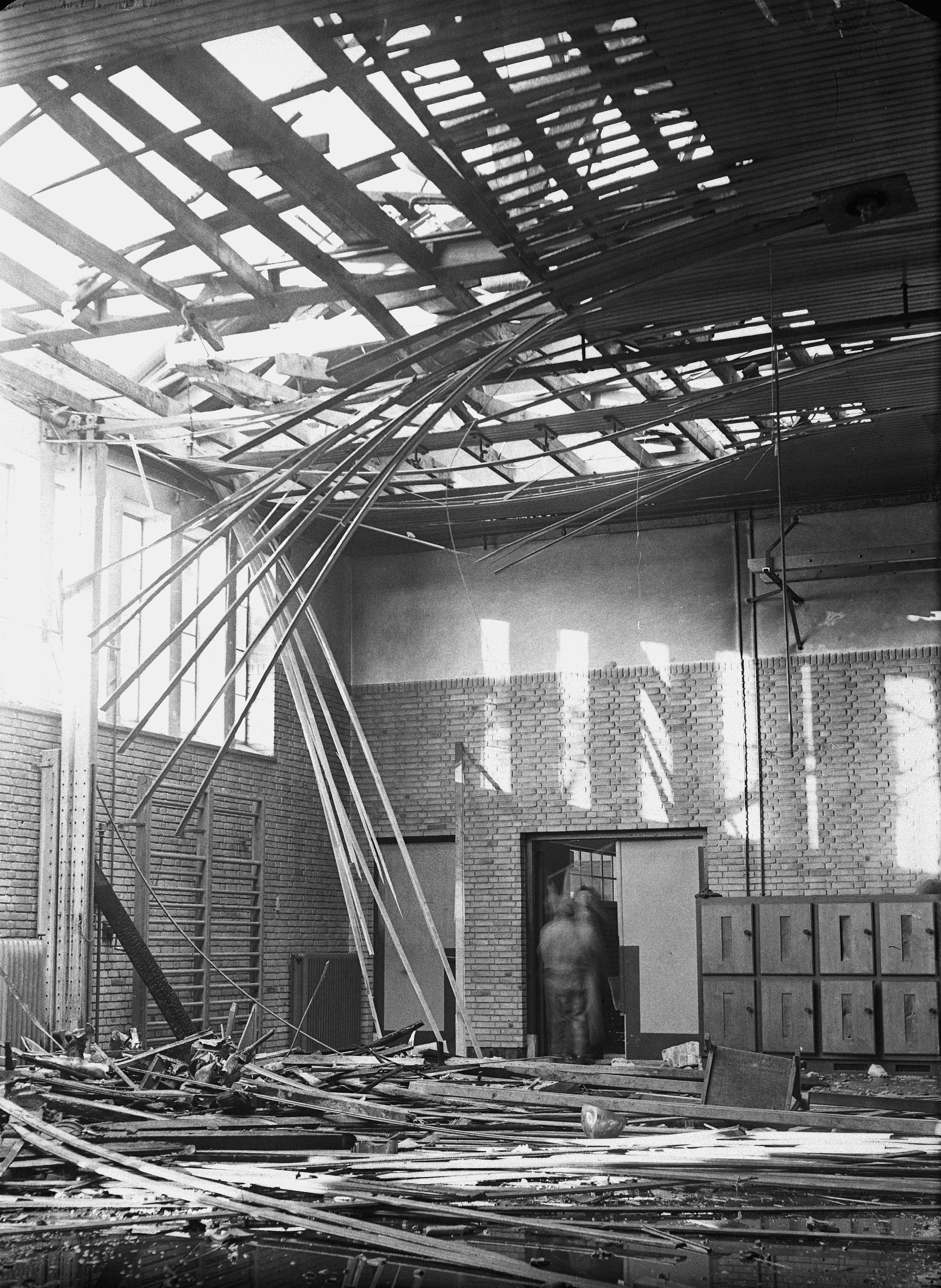
The damaged gym

Polygoon newsreel of the aftermath of the crash and communal burial

The Fairey Firefly departed from Valkenburg Naval Air Base for a half-hour practice flight. The pilot, sergeant Max Christern, was on his first Firefly solo flight. The pilot was given the order to fly in the neighbourhood of the air base to become familiar with the aircraft and then return to the airbase. However, the pilot flew to Apeldoorn where his mother lived. In Apeldoorn he made some dives above the market square. Afterwards he flew in the direction where his mother lived. Christern was flying very low, and probably saw the school tower of the Hogere Burgerschool too late. With an extreme maneuver he managed to avoid the tower, but his right wing touched the left corner of the school building. The wing broke off, tearing open the fuel tank at the bottom of the wing. The fuel tank fell on the roof of the gym and burning fuel flowed into the gym. In the gym were 27 students and the teacher of class 2C at the time. The airplane crashed with Christen inside, into the trees right behind the school building.

Inside the gym there was an enormous fire and enormous smoke development. As a result panic broke out. Most of the students managed to escape the classroom, some while burning. Not everyone managed to escape. Four students who managed to escape jumped into the nearby pond to put out the fire.

== Victims ==
Due to the crash the pilot and 22 schoolchildren died. Four students and the teacher were seriously injured and hospitalized.

While most of the 27 students initially managed to escape the gym, many of them had serious burns and two days later the death toll was 22. Four of the five students who survived the accident were injured. Initially teacher Hendrik Jan Dobbenga, was only slightly injured, but was seriously injured in his attempts to save children. Three times he managed to save a student from the hall, during his fourth attempt, he became seriously injured by a beam. He was in mortal danger but survived.

Pilot Christern was found dead in a pit next to the plane. The mother of the pilot had gone to the school with her daughter immediately after the crash. She died from a heart attack after she was told her son had died in the disaster.

The pilot Max Christern (born 1923) was Dutch-born and had German citizenship. As being a Reich German, Christern was called up during World War II for service in the German army. In an attempt for desertion he applied for pilot training and managed to get hold of a plane at the Russian front and flew towards England. He went into hiding after a forced landing in the Netherlands. In March 1945 he registered with the British Royal Air Force, where he was deployed as a scout after pilot training. After liberation of the Netherlands Christern signed-up with the Dutch army and was stationed at Valkenburg Naval Air Base where he had the rank of sergeant-flyer. In 1946 he would move with the HNLMS Karel Doorman (R81) to the Dutch East Indies flying the new Fairey Firefly. After approval, that was on day of the accident, he made his first Firefly solo flight.

== Funerals ==
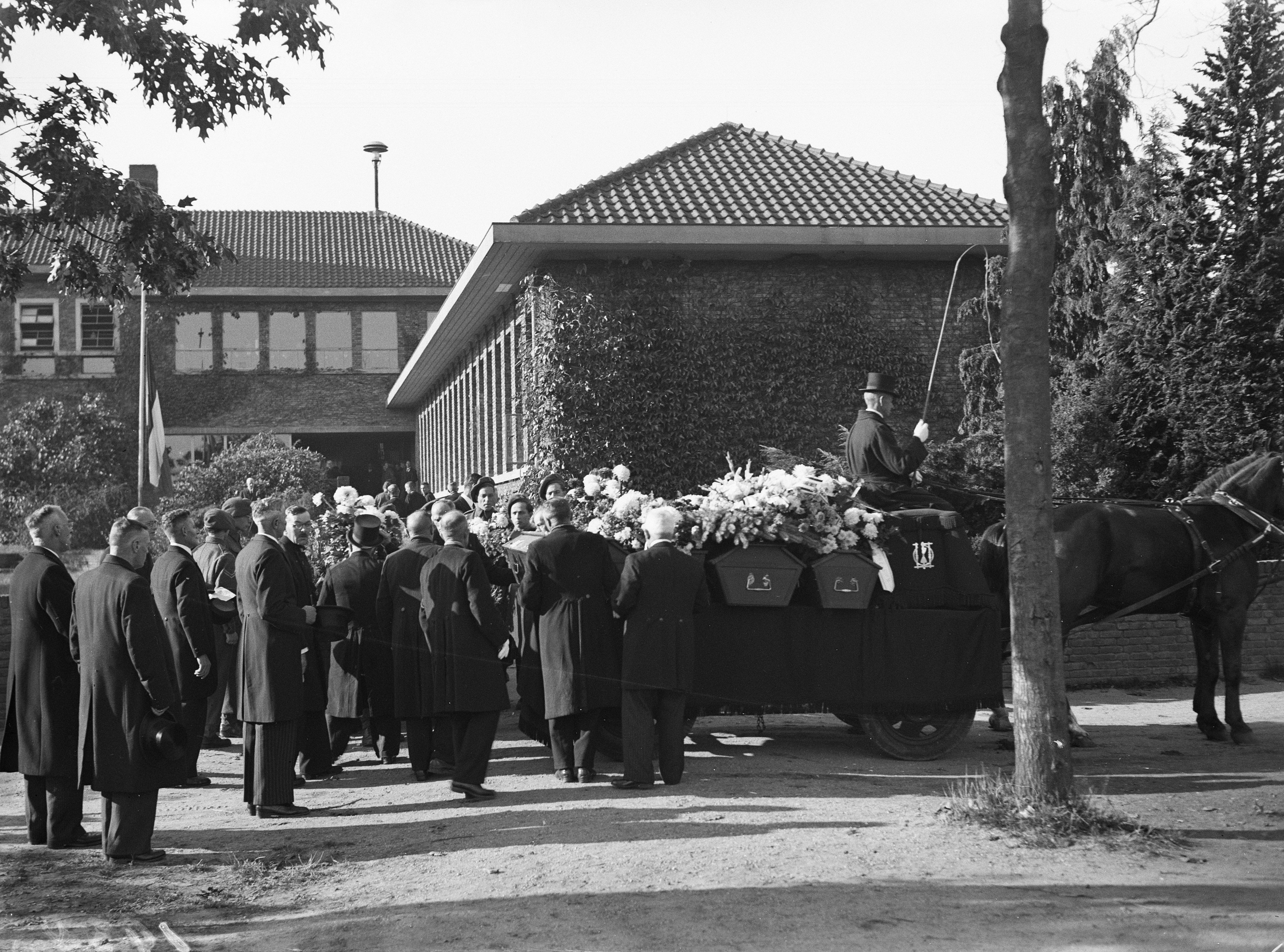
Coffins placed on five horse-drawn wagons in front of the school

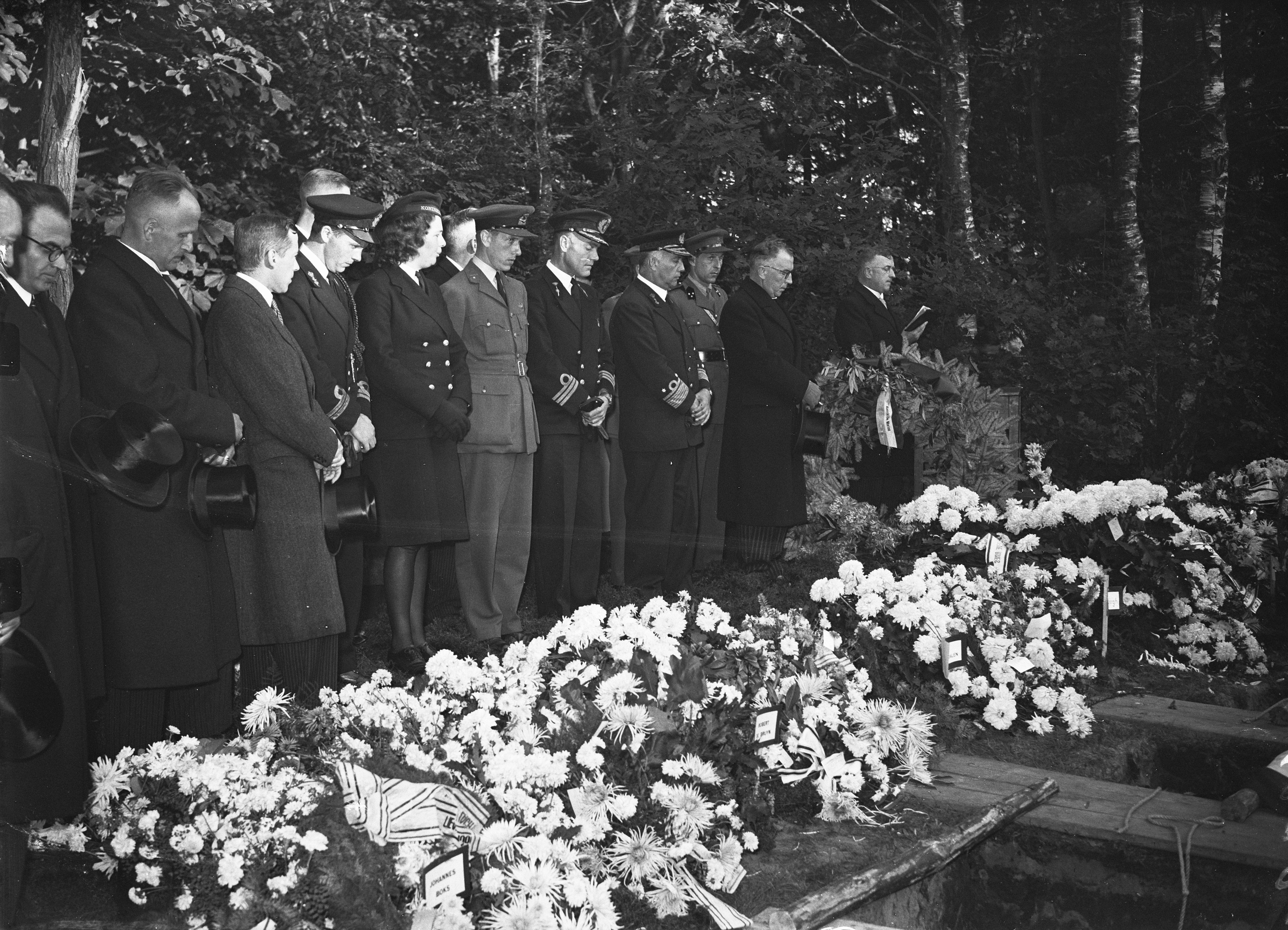
Speech at the communal burial

The municipal council decided that the children would be buried together at the municipal cemetery. Two children were buried elsewhere. Initially two other children were to be buried at a Catholic cemetery in Apeldoorn, but this was not done. The bodies of the children lay in state in the hospital, with the exception of Piet Kroon, who died last in hospital, and was laid in state at his parental home. There were four funerals: on 10 October the funeral of Henk Schuite in Hardenberg; on 11 October the funeral of 20 students and at another place the cremation of pilot Max Christern and his mother took place. On 12 October the funeral of Tonny van Velzen took place in Oud Eik en Duinen. All funerals of the students were attended by dignitaries. Because many children were a member of scouting, members of scouting groups had a role in the different funerals.

The first funeral, of Henk Schuite, took place in Hardenberg on Thursday 10 June 1958. His father Bauke Albert Schuite had been the mayor of Stad Hardenberg between 1922 and 1931 and the family had a family grave where he was buried. The funeral was attended by delegates from the Apeldoorn municipal council, the Royal Navy, the school and students.

That evening a service was held at the Grote Kerk in Apeldoorn for the other students. The next day, on 11 June 1958, a public service was held in the Catholic Church for the two Catholic boys. Afterwards, the bodies were laid out in the school where the disaster had happened. The coffins were placed on five horse-drawn wagons covered with black cloths and moved to the cemetery. Members of the 4th Company D.K.G. walked next to the wagons with the coffins. Among the many dignitaries was the Schout-bij-nacht of the Commander of the Royal Netherlands Navy J. A. Gauw. A wreath was laid on behalf of Queen Wilhelmina of the Netherlands. Jan Visser was the only survivor of the disaster who attended the ceremony. The other four boys and the teacher were still in the hospital. There were several speakers at the cemetery. Owing to the large number of attendees, people had to wait outside the cemetery.

On the same day pilot Max Christern and his mother Maria Christern-Slingervoet Ramondt were cremated in Driehuis. As well as family and relatives, the cremation was attended by many colleagues. One of the speakers was the naval chaplain who spoke on behalf of the Commander of the Royal Netherlands Navy.

Two days later on Saturday morning 12 October Tonny van Velzen was buried at Oud Eik en Duinen. Also this funeral was attended by a large number of people including dignitaries.

== Reactions ==
Shortly after the disaster, many people and agencies shared their condolences, including Queen Wilhelmina of the Netherlands and mayor of Apeldoorn Loek des Tombe.

=== Responsibility ===
Schout-bij-nacht of the Commander of the Royal Netherlands Navy J. A. Gauw said in his speech at the funeral that the disaster was mainly due to “youthful overconfidence”. Shortly after the accident, the Aviation Council assumed, without conducting an investigation, that the crash was the result of a failure by the pilot. The Minister of the Navy, Jules Schagen van Leeuwen, stated that the navy would not be blamed for the disaster. However, nobody took responsibility for the disaster and no investigation has been done into the cause of the accident. The lack of taking responsibility and the fact that no investigation was carried out, led to misunderstanding among relatives.

=== Memorials and remembrance ===
In January 1947, the school board decided to create a memorial at the cemetery. The memorial was designed by G. Post Greve and P. Schurink and is made of yellow Bavarian granite and was made by S. Meijer en Zn. in Apeldoorn. During a ceremony on 12 June 1948, the memorial for the victims was handed over to the parents' committee by the chairman of the school board. The monument is placed centrally behind the graves. The individual grave monuments each consist of a stone console with a granite text plate. On the memorial behind the grave is written "SLACHTOFFERS VLIEGRAMP CHR. H.B.S. 7 OKTOBER 1946" (translated: Plane crash Christian HBS 7 October 1946"). Herman Schuite and Tonny van Velzen, who were buried elsewhere, are listed on the stones on the left and right.

A tile tableau was placed in the school with the names of the victims.

The disaster is still commemorated annually. Students of the school places annually flowers at the monument.

A memorial book about the disaster was published in 1987, 41 years after the crash, entitled: "7-10-1946 | Waarom!?" (translated: "7-10-1946 | Why!?"). The book includes contributions from relatives, survivors and others who were involved.

== See also ==
- Freckleton air disaster, where a Consolidated B-24H Liberator bomber crashed into a school building in England
- 1956 Eindhoven Lockheed T-33 crash - a similar Dutch crash where the pilot flew to his relative and crashed into houses
- 1990 Italian Air Force Aermacchi MB-326 crash, where a military jet crashed into a school building in Italy
- Air India Flight 171, where a Boeing 787-8 Dreamliner crashed into BJ Medical College in Ahmedabad, India
- 2025 Dhaka fighter jet crash, also a first solo flight of a pilot crashing his fighter into a school building in Dhaka, Bangladesh
