= 1956 Eindhoven Lockheed T-33 crash =

1956 aviation crash

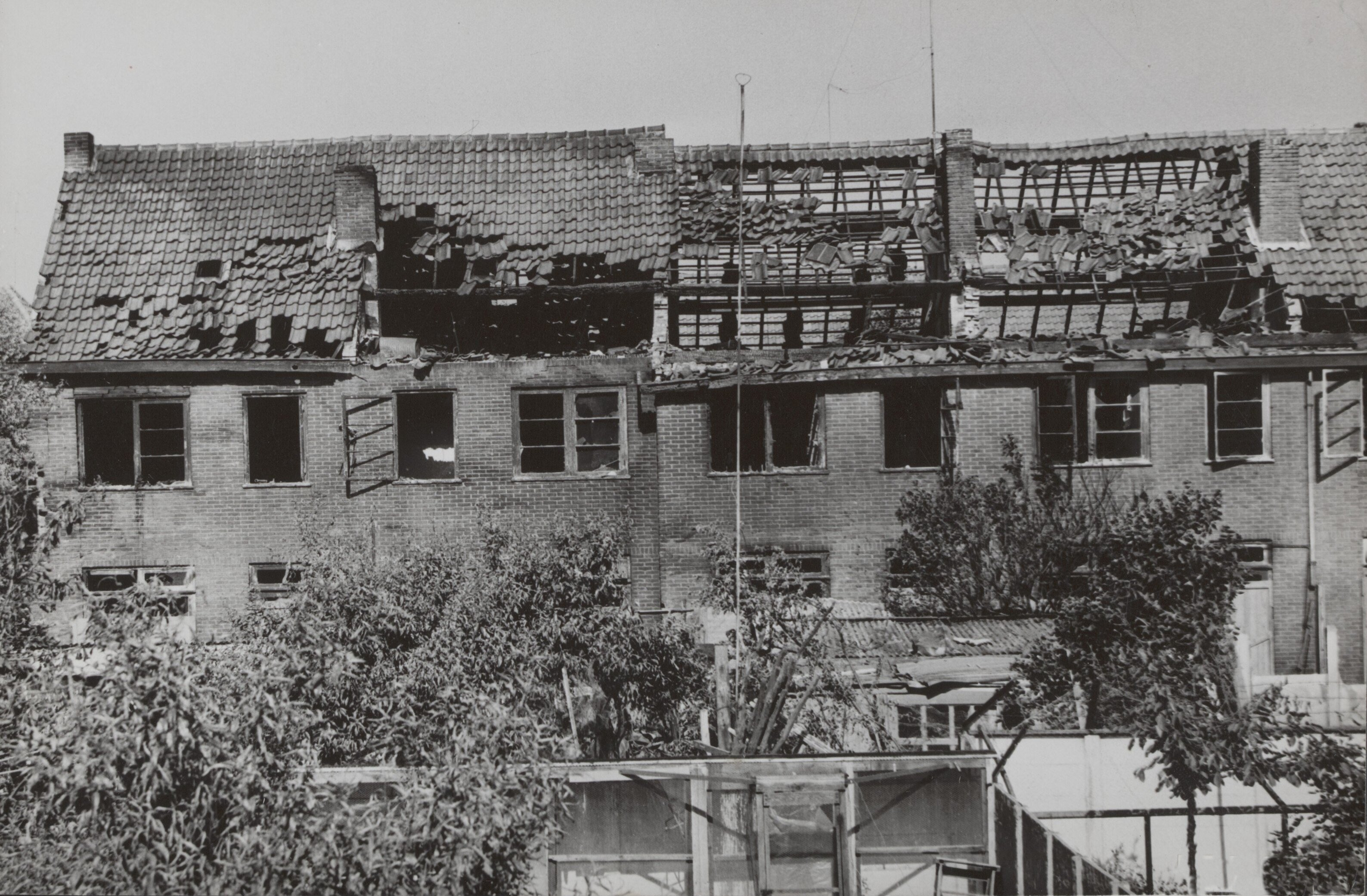
- Some of the burned houses due to the crash

Accident
- Date: 22 September 1956
- Summary: Pilot error; reckless flying
- Site: Eindhoven (Strijp), the Netherlands
- Total fatalities: 2
- Total injuries: 23

Aircraft
- Aircraft type: Lockheed T-33
- Operator: Royal Netherlands Air Force
- Flight origin: Volkel Air Base
- Occupants: 1
- Crew: 1
- Fatalities: 1
- Survivors: -

Ground casualties
- Ground fatalities: 1
- Ground injuries: 23

On 22 September 1956, a Lockheed T-33 of the Royal Netherlands Air Force crashed at c. 01:45pm in a housing block in Eindhoven, the Netherlands. The pilot and one person on the ground were killed. Four houses burned down, twelve houses partly burned down and many more were severely damaged.

The pilot had recently married and lived with his wife at the place where the crash occurred. It was the first solo flight of the pilot. He deliberately ignored his instructions and safety rules and flew above his own house. The crash was likely due to a misjudgment resulting from his inexperience.

== Flight and crash ==
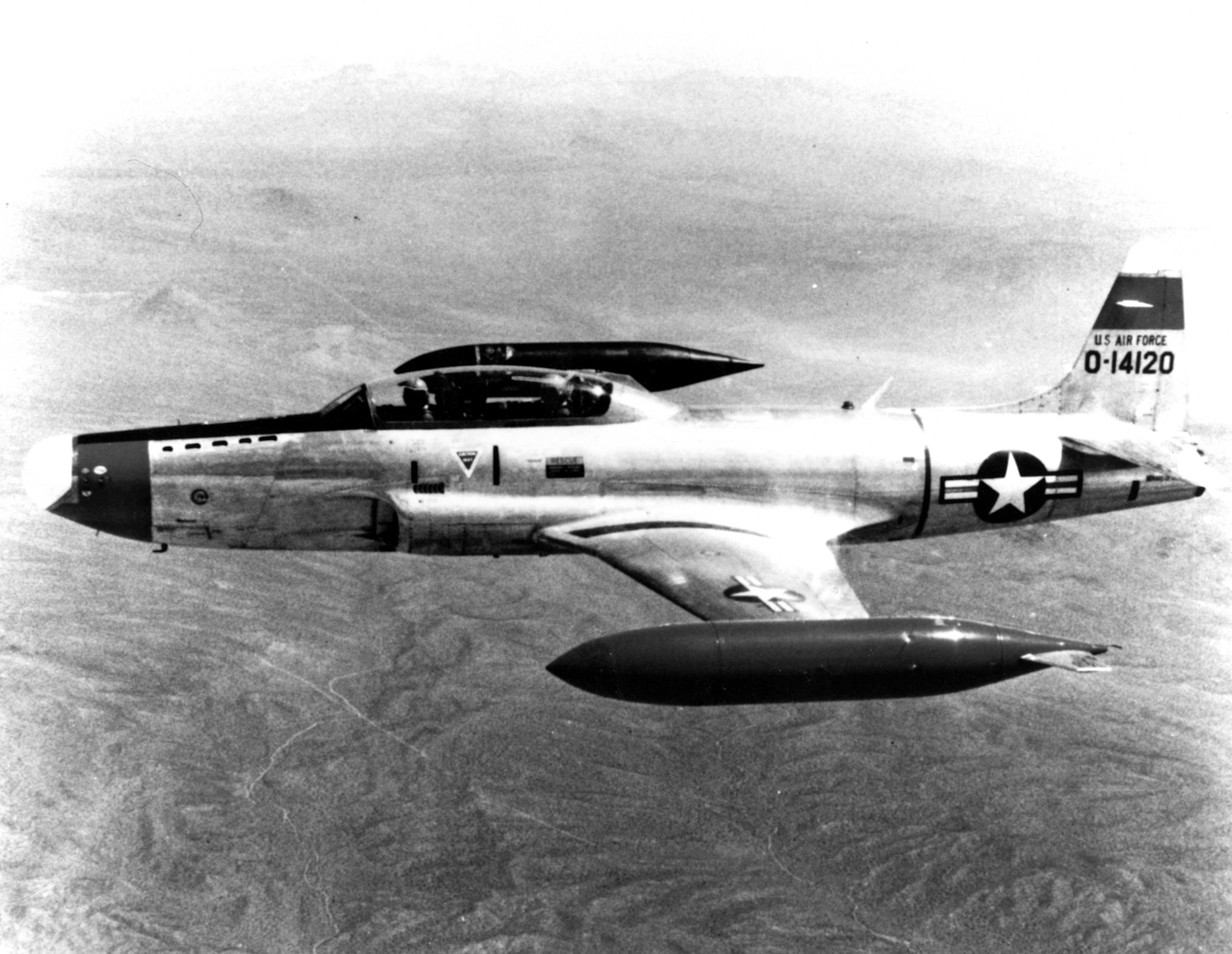
A similar Lockheed NT-33 (of the American Air Force) as involved in the crash.

In the afternoon of 22 September 1956, a Lockheed T-33 training plane of the Royal Netherlands Air Force departed from Volkel Air Base. According to the Royal Netherlands Air Force, the pilot was instructed to make a reconnaissance flight, followed by a few landings at Volkel Air Base. At around 01:45pm, the aircraft approached Eindhoven from south-east direction. According to eyewitnesses, the jet circled a few times above Strijp before the crash. The jet came in low at only a few hundred metres according to eyewitnesses at a high speed. It looked like the pilot wanted to land because he was flying so low. The wing of the jet hit the top of the house at Zeelsterstraat 166 and crashed into houses a few hundred meters further away. The fuel tanks exploded. The explosion was heard beyond Eindhoven. Due to the rain of burning kerosene, many houses were set on fire. Four houses were totally burned down, twelve houses partly burned down and many more houses were severely damaged.

== Victims ==
Two people died and over twenty people were injured. Many people were in a state of shock in the hours after the crash. Many of the injured people suffered fire and shrapnel wounds. Some were helped at the scene and eighteen people were hospitalized (seven to the Catharina Ziekenhuis and two to the Diaconessenhuis).

The two people who died due to the crash were the pilot and Mr. Jan Kortoom. The pilot was Sergeant A. de Jong living in Eindhoven who was 24 years old. He escaped just before the crash with his ejection seat. However, he landed in one of the burning houses and was found dead next to his ejection seat, 15 metres from his own house. The other person that was killed was Mr. Jan Kortoom, 48 or 51 years old, a construction worker, and lived at the “Bergen op Zoomstraat”. At the moment of the crash, he was cleaning his motorbike in his backyard. He was killed by a metal fragment that hit his head.

It was reported that there could have been many more victims. Many people were not at home as they were celebrating the Celebration Day of Eindhoven that day or were away because it was a very sunny Saturday. There were several people outside in the affected area who survived and several people were saved from the burning houses.

== Aftermath ==
Video of the crash aftermath

The first firefighters arrived five minutes after the crash. The fire and ambulance departments of Eindhoven and Eindhoven Air Base went to the disaster area. The civil defense organization Bescherming Bevolking also helped. After the people were rescued from the burning houses, the household effects were saved and placed on the streets. The Air Force moved the household effects with trucks to a hangar.

The Eindhoven Air Base commander Von Rest flew in from Germany and created emergency housing in the officers' mess and at camp Beatrix for twelve families (39 people) who became homeless. Most homeless people moved in at family places in Eindhoven.

The mayor of Eindhoven Hans Kolfschoten was at the flower parade of the Celebration Day of Eindhoven when the crash occurred, and immediately ordered the music to stop. In the evening the minister of defense Kees Staf arrived by airplane and visited together the disaster area with the mayor of Eindhoven. Minister Staff ordered a speedy restoration of the houses. He also gave financial support to the affected families. About ten houses were made habitable again within two weeks.

The day after the crash, on 23 September, the Commander of the Royal Netherlands Air Force Anton Baretta visited the crash site with his wife and expressed condolences to the affected families.

== Investigation ==
The pilot recently completed a refresher course, and so he knew that it was not allowed to fly at a low altitude and to fly above built-up areas. It was his first solo flight. The pilot was just married and lived with his wife at the Bergen op Zoomstraat 153 with the family of his wife. The pilot had told his wife that he would fly low above their house between 1:30pm and 2:30pm. His wife had told other people this before the crash.

During the flight, the pilot didn't have contact with the ground, though it is a normal procedure that a pilot didn't have radio contact during these flights. Normally, there was only radio contact before landing or when something was wrong. According to the Royal Netherlands Air Force, the pilot deliberately ignored the given instructions. The Dutch Air Force also stated that his commanders had been very clear regarding the correct execution of the given orders.

In an early report it was stated that the pilot attempted to climb before the crash, but failed in doing so. According to the investigation committee, there are multiple possible explanations for why the pilot was not able to avoid the house in time. The most plausible reason is that he didn't react in time, as he was unexperienced and it was his first solo flight. Other reasons included that he misjudged his height or that he became unwell. As he was flying in a westerly direction, it is also possible that he was blinded by the bright sun or he was inattentive by searching for his home and wife. A technical defect was also not ruled out at first.

== See also ==
- 1946 Apeldoorn aircraft crash - a similar crash where a pilot flew to his relative and crashed into a school
