= Eemnes =

- Municipality
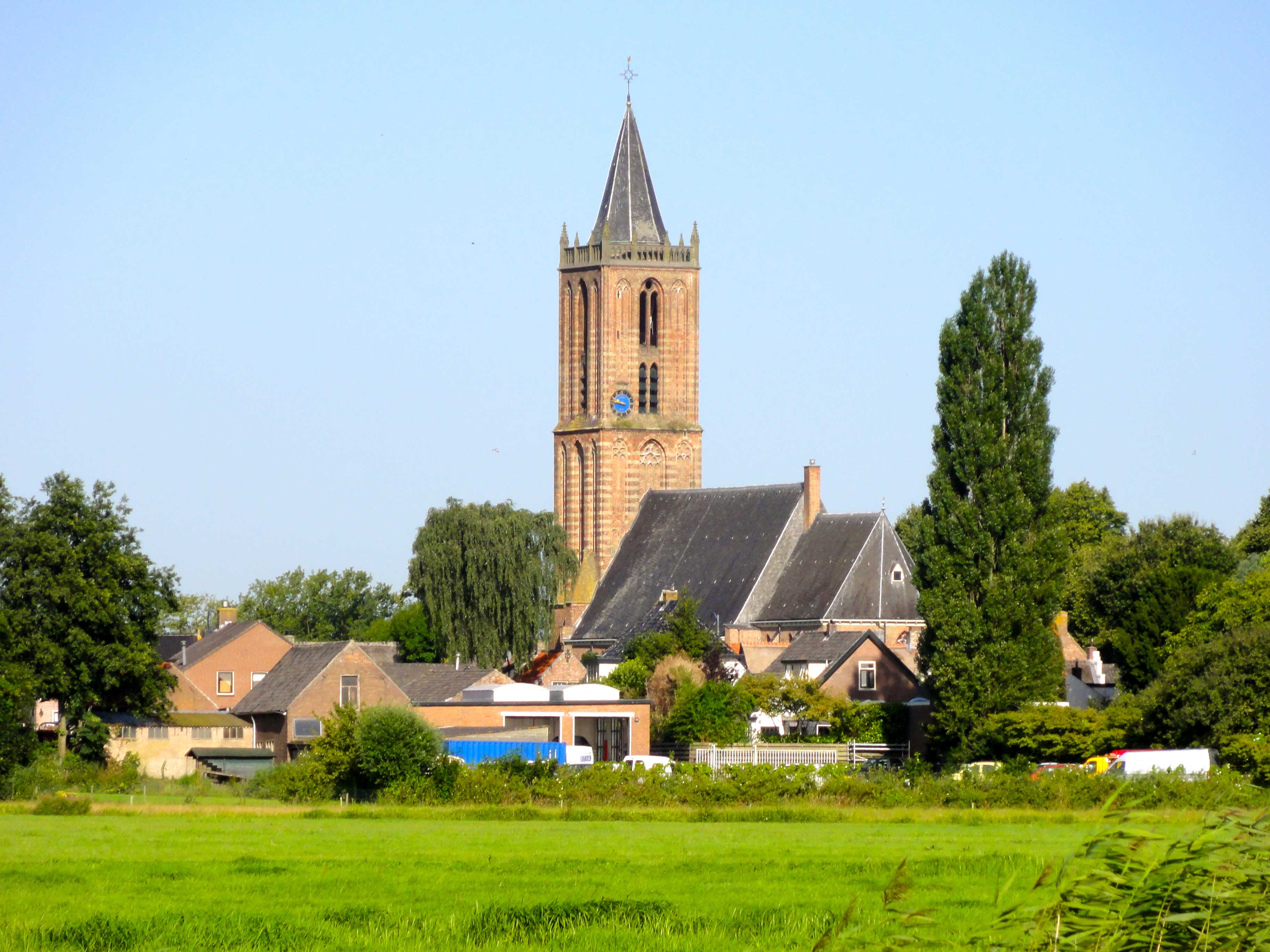
- Church in Eemnes

- Flag Coat of arms

- Location in Utrecht
- Coordinates: 52°15′N 5°15′E
- Country: Netherlands
- Province: Utrecht

Government
  - Body: Municipal council
  - Mayor: Roland van Benthem (VVD)

Area
  - Total: 33.70 km^{2} (13.01 sq mi)
  - Land: 31.04 km^{2} (11.98 sq mi)
  - Water: 2.66 km^{2} (1.03 sq mi)
- Elevation: 1 m (3.3 ft)

Population (January 2021)
  - Total: 9,362
  - Density: 302/km^{2} (780/sq mi)
- Time zone: UTC+1 (CET)
  - Summer (DST): UTC+2 (CEST)
- Postcode: 3755
- Area code: 035
- Website: www.eemnes.nl

Eemnes (Dutch pronunciation: [eːmˈnɛs]) is a municipality and a village in the Netherlands, in the province of Utrecht.

== The town of Eemnes ==
Eemnes formerly consisted of two villages, Eemnes-Binnen ("Inner Eemnes") and Eemnes-Buiten ("Outer Eemnes"). These names referred to the location of the villages with respect to the dyke of the river Eem.

Eemnes-Buiten received city rights in 1345; Eemnes-Binnen was granted city rights in 1439.

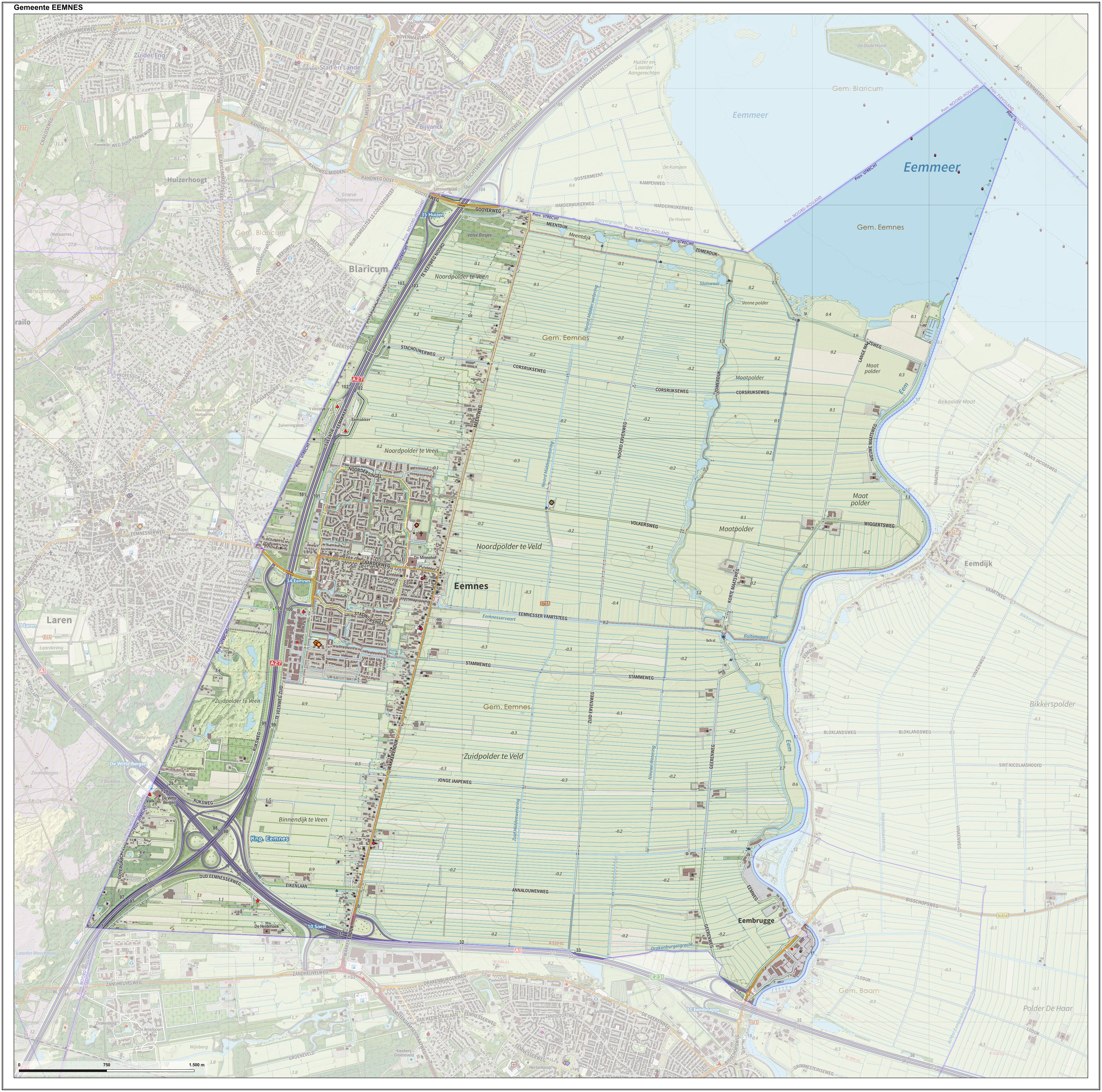

Dutch topographic map of the municipality of Eemnes, June 2015

== Pools ==
Until 1932, when the Afsluitdijk sealed off the Zuiderzee from the North Sea, the weak dykes in this part of the country would occasionally break during storms. This resulted in the formation of pools, which in Dutch are called "waaien" or "wielen". Because they could be tens of meters in diameter and several metres deep, landowners often did not make the effort of filling them up. Because they symbolize man's battle against the sea and are relatively rare, provincial authorities designated them "geological monuments" in June 2005.

== Notable people ==
- Johannes Gijsbertus de Casparis (1916 in Eemnes – 2002) was a Dutch orientalist and Indologist
- Roland van Benthem (born 1968 in Emmeloord) a Dutch politician and is the current mayor of Eemnes since 2005.
- Rocco Coronel (born 2010 in Eemnes) a Dutch racing driver

== Notable events ==
- 14 December 1917: Coastal class airship C.26 crash

== Gallery ==
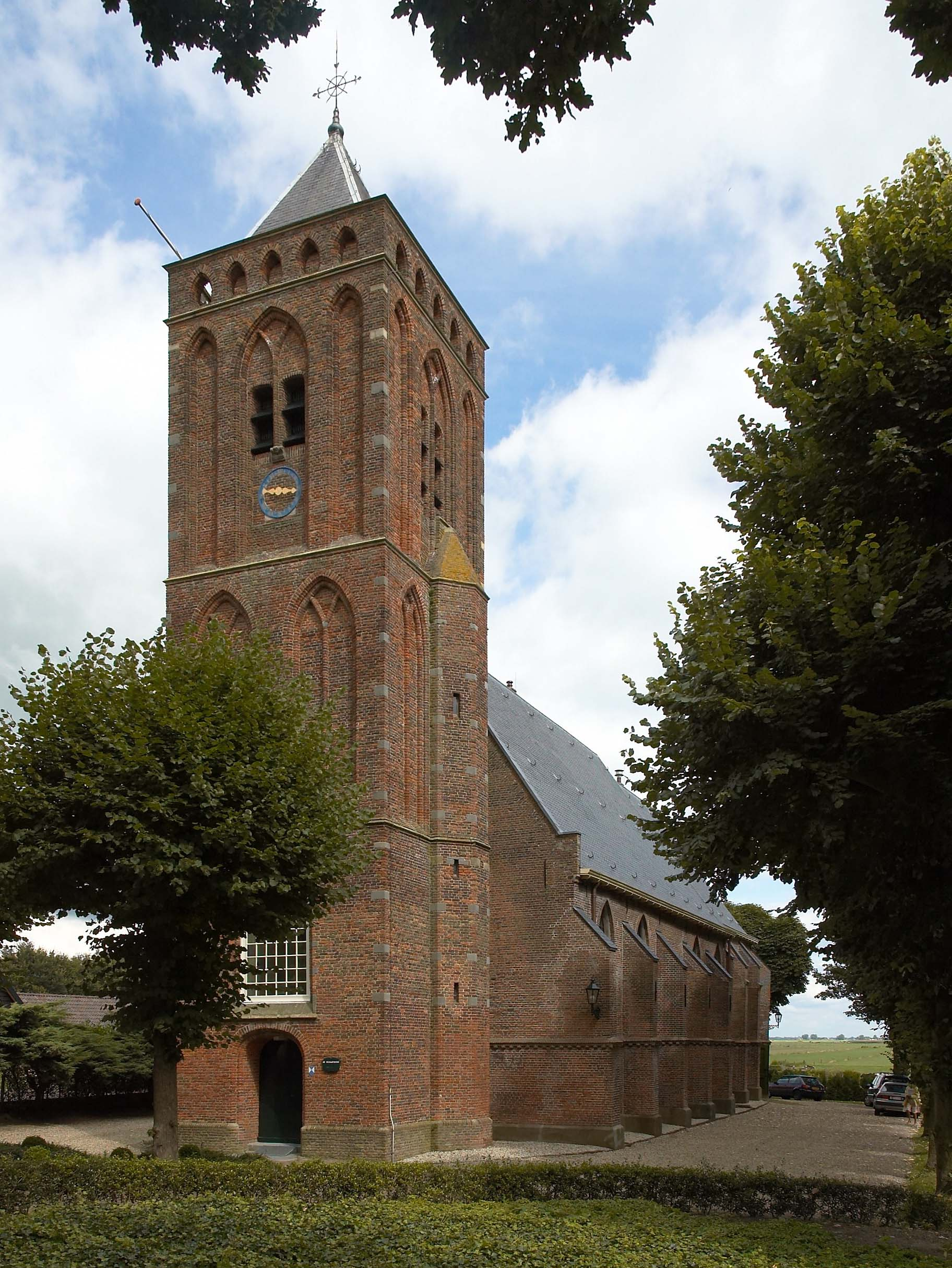
Church in Eemnes-Binnen

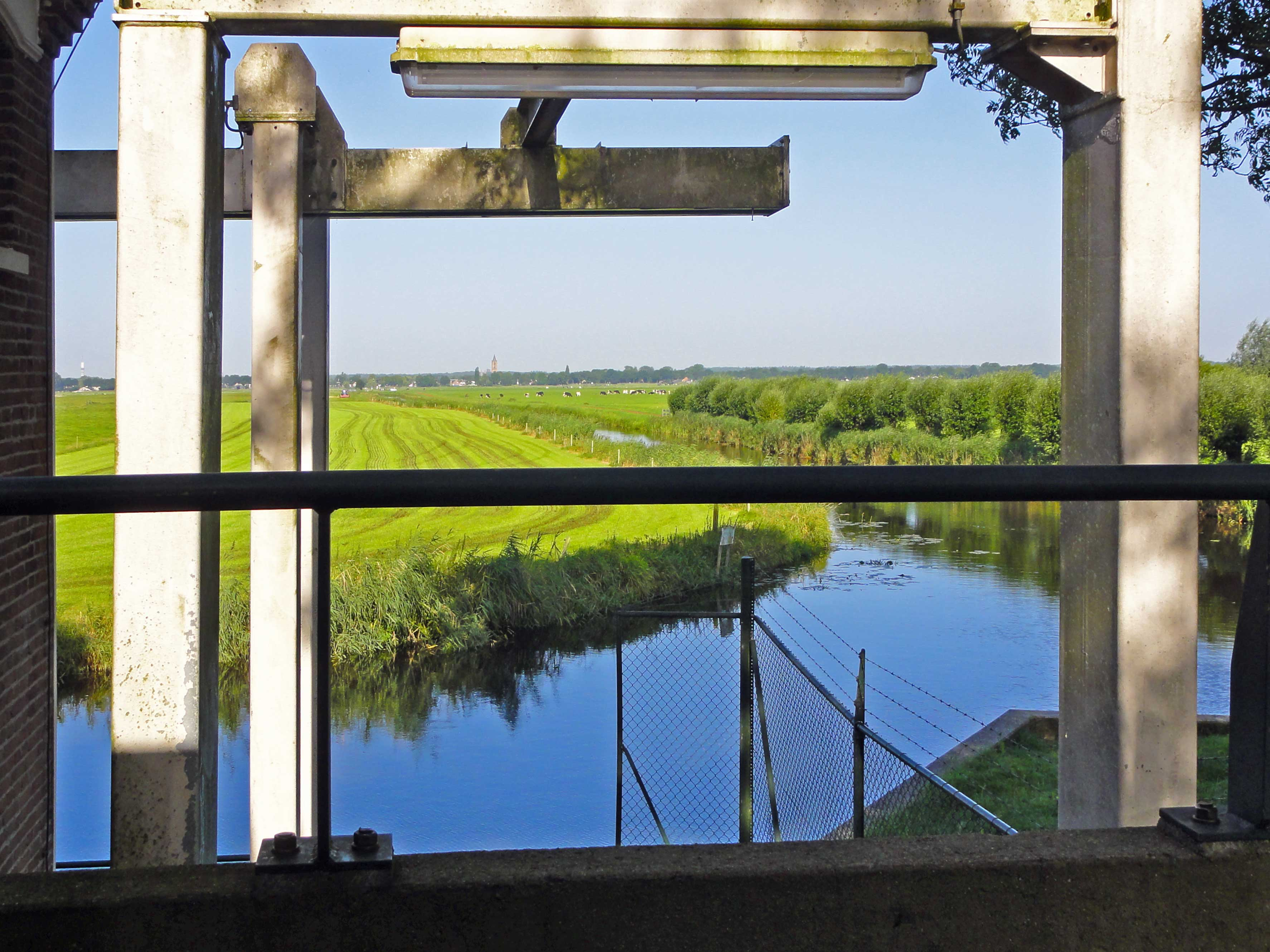
Eemnesservaart vanaf Eemnessersluis

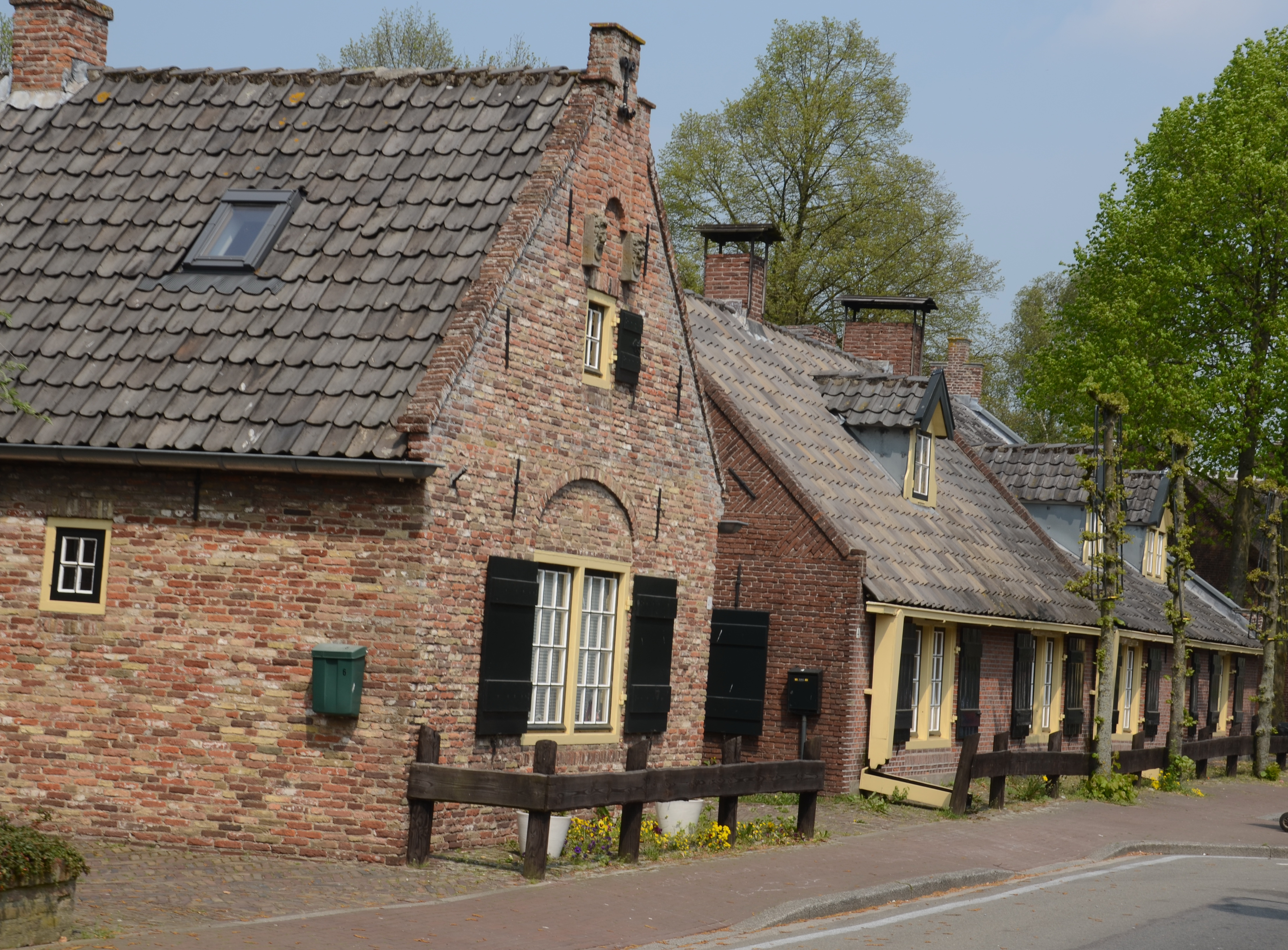
Characteristic old Dutch houses at the center of Eemnes

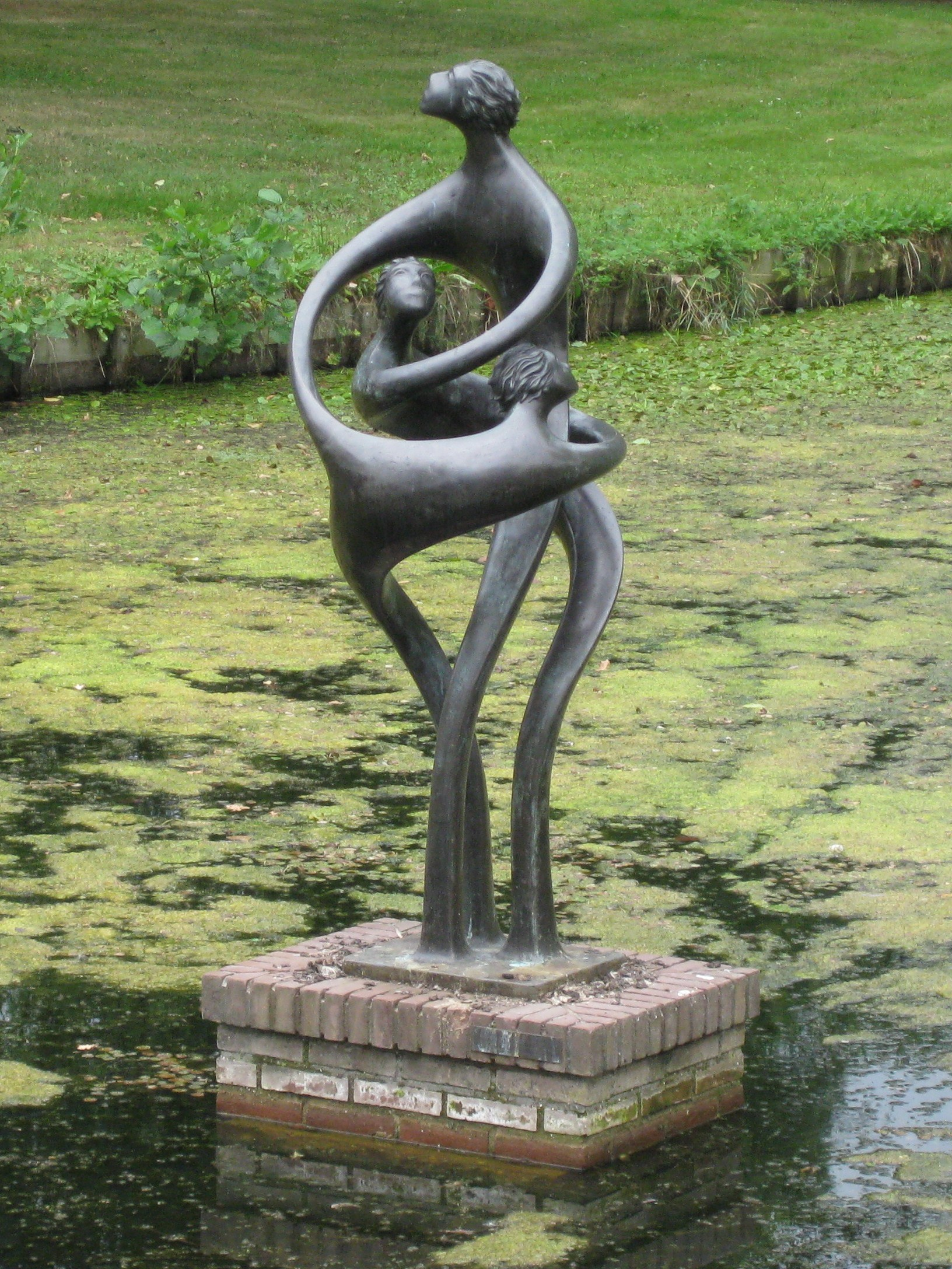
Samenwerking

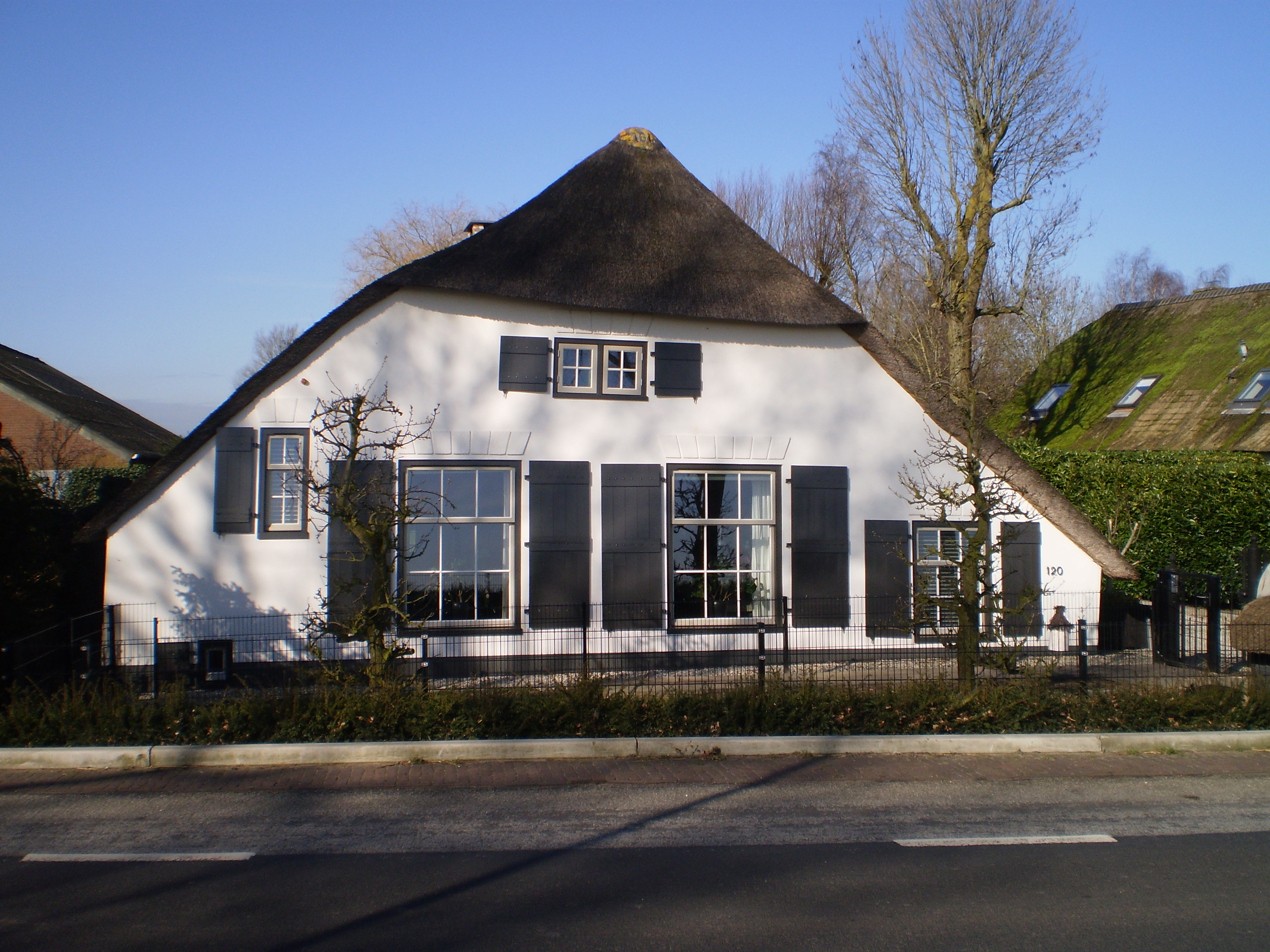
Eemnes Wakkerendijk
