= Coastal class airship C.26 crash =

British airship (1916–1917)

C.26
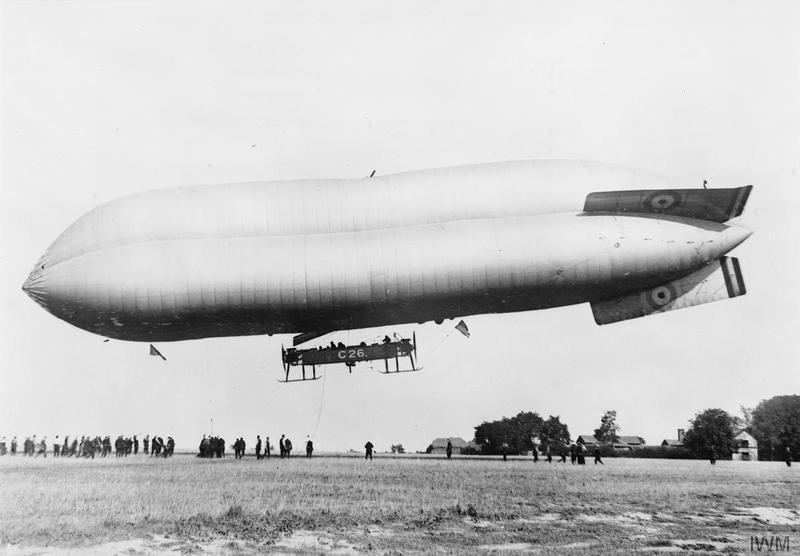

General information
- Type: non-rigid airship
- National origin: United Kingdom
- Built by: RNAS Kingsnorth
- Serial: C.26
- Flights: 202 hours

History
- First flight: 21 November 1916
- Last flight: 14 December 1917
- Fate: After drifting over the North Sea due to an engine failure while searching C.27, the airship finally crashed in Eemnes

The Royal Naval Air Service C.26 was a Coastal class World War I non-rigid airship. The airship was used to search for German submarines off the British coast. The airship had made a total of 202 flight hours between 21 November 1916 and 14 December 1917.

The airship was powered by two Daimler-branded 12-cylinder engines and could stay in the air for 22 hours. The balloon of the airship was about 60 meters long. The airship had a crew of five in a gondola below the balloon. After drifting over the North Sea due to an engine failure, the airship finally crashed in Eemnes the Netherlands in the morning of 14 December 1917.

== Crew ==
- Commander flight lieutenant G.C.C. Kilburn. Kilburn started his services in 1915, as a midshipman. On 11 November 1915, he made his first flight in an airship, the SS14. After a long training he was transferred to Scotland in June 1916, where flew for the first time on a Coastal Class airship. He first flew in the C.5 and later that year in the C.7. In August 1916, Kilburn flew his first flight as commander and became a Coastal Class pilot the same month. In January 1917, he was stationed at Kingsnorth. In June 1917, he was stationed at Pulham where he became commander of the C.26 and sometimes flew the C.27. In July 1917, he was promoted to flight lieutenant. On 17 July 1917, he made a parachute jump out of the C.26.
- Second officer flight lieutenant H.E.C. Plowden.
- Coxswain petty officer A. C. "Arthur" Townsend. Townsend (born 1896) joined the Royal Naval after his 16th birthday in April 1912. He started his service as a sailor at the HMNB Devonport.
- Leading mechanic F.D. Johncock.
- Aircraft mechanical class 2 (AM2) F.W. Warman.

== Fate ==
On 13 December 1917, in search for airship C.27 which had run into difficulties off the British coast. The commander of the C.27, flight lieutenant J.F. Dixon DFC, was also a very good friend of Kilburn. The C.26 couldn't find the airship, unaware that it was shot down by a German plane. Due to low visibility, they were ordered to return at 13:04 pm. At 3:40 pm, they stated over the radio they were twelve miles east of Yarmouth. However, at around 4:00 pm, they reached the coast somewhere south of Lowestoft, so not near Yarmouth. Because of the poor visibility they first followed the coast towards Lowestoft to be sure of their position. After they reached Beccles during their return, at around 5:00 pm, the rear engine stopped working for an unknown cause. After a few attempts to restart the engine, they attempted to land, but this failed because they could not release enough gas to descend sufficiently. Pulham Base received, at around 5:15 pm, the message of the C.26 that they experienced trouble with one of their engines and were drifting out to sea, about four kilometers east of Lowestoft. Lowestoft was informed, but due to poor visibility, the airship could not be seen.

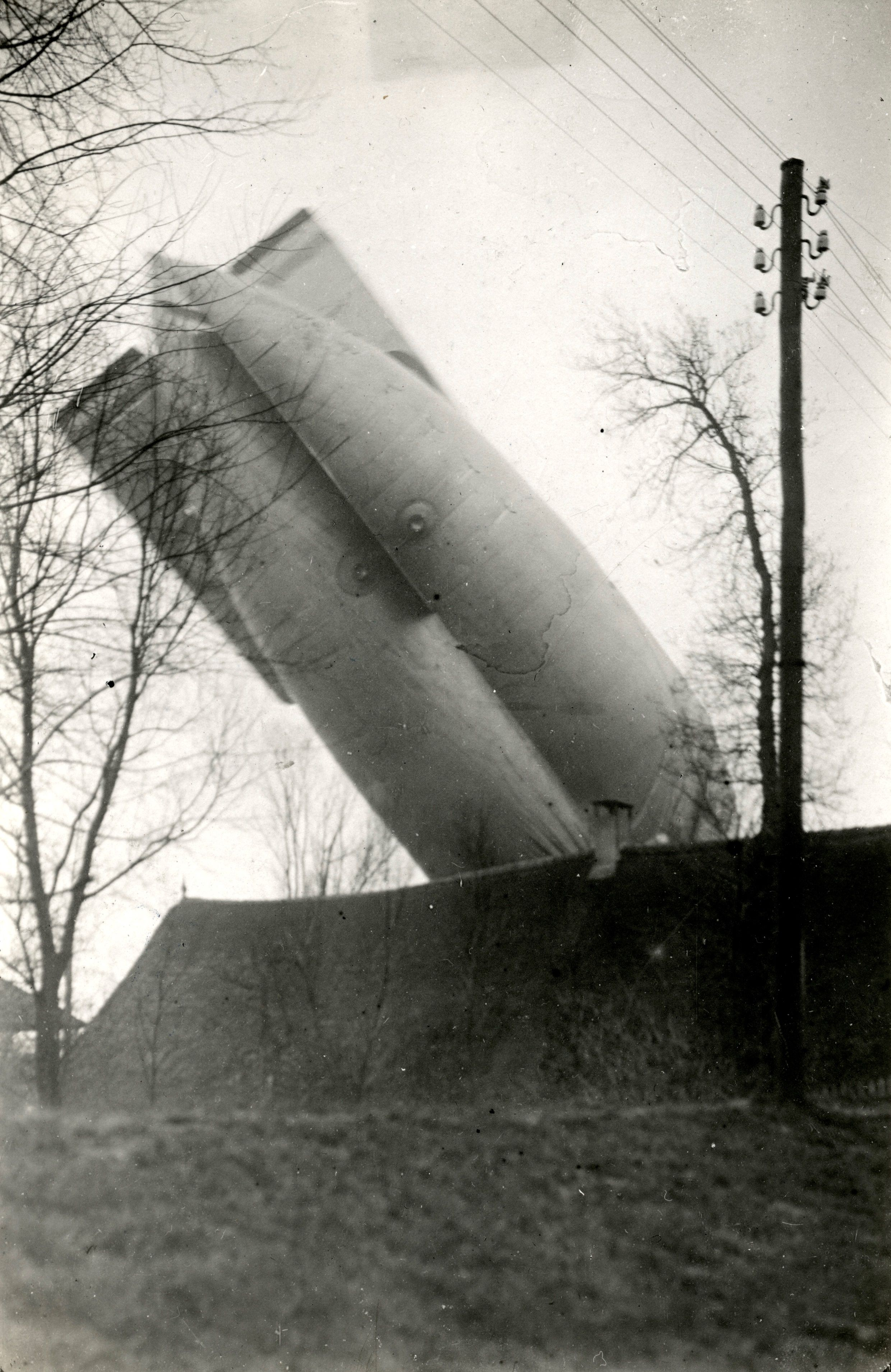
C.26 hanging vertically at "Wakkerendijk 3" Eemnes

While drifting over sea towards the Netherlands, they regularly sent out light signals with the Aldis flash lamp and fired flares. At around 11:00 pm the braking chute suddenly opened, reducing the speed to around 8 knots. At 1:00 am, the aircraft started touching the water. They threw ballast and a bomb overboard to maintain altitude. They ascended to 3700 feet, were well balanced again and tried to make radio contact. The last message that was received was at 1:23 am, being an incomplete message: "Pulham of C.26...". At around 1:30 am, they reached the Dutch coast. They failed to land, due to failure of one of the top flaps; which they got fixed later. Due to the fog and darkness, they couldn't see the ground. When the anchor caught for the 2nd time on something at 3:15 am in Poortugaal, Kilburn gave the order to jump overboard. While they were much higher than guessed (over 30 feet) four of the five on board were able of the jump overboard surviving the fall. Tossend injured his leg and Plowden fell into a canal. The fifth person, Warman, was not able to jump because he got stuck on a support beam. Because the cables had been knocked out of the hands of those who jumped and the airship had become lighter, the airship flew on again. After hanging upside down on the support beam for about an hour, Warman let go and fell into a ditch at Sliedrecht.

The unmanned C.26 was driven north by the wind, where it got stuck, around 5:30 am, on pulled telegraph wires on a tree near a steam pumping station at the Vecht near Utrecht. A number of bombs, an oil sprayer, a petrol can and a parachute fell out without causing any damage.

The C.26 eventually got loose and flew via Hoge Vuursche, to Eemnes where it came down and pulled a telephone pole with 200 meters of electricity cables. The airship destroyed a chimney and ended up on a bakery at "Wakkerendijk 3". The balloon body caught on the back of the house and rose vertically on the roof. The gondola had hit the wall and was bent in half.

=== Aftermath ===
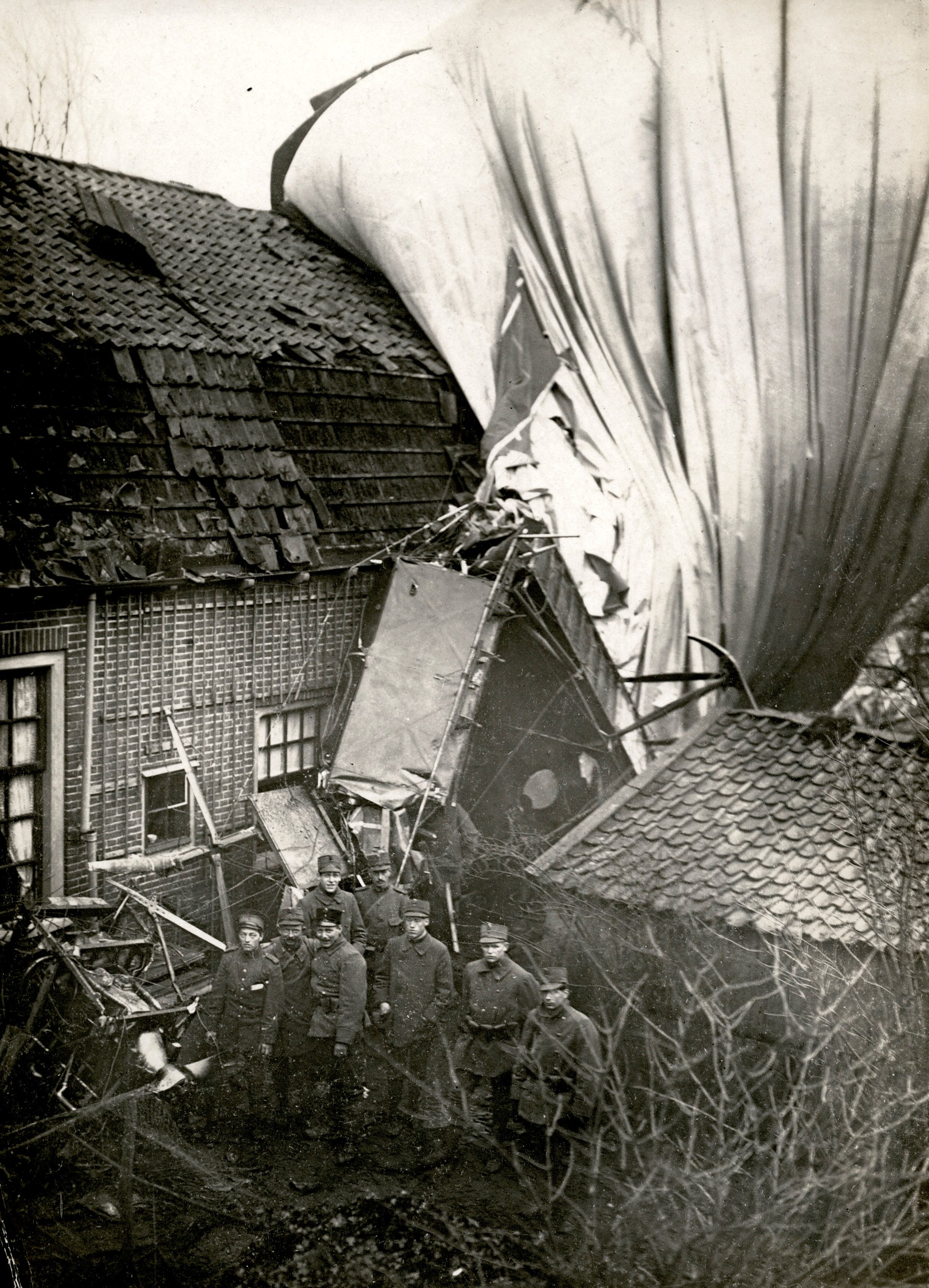
Helpers in front of C.26 remains

Due to the flashes and sounds of the crash, local residents initially thought there were bombings. It was not clear what kind of airship it was, as initial Dutch reports named it a Zeppelin or a French airship.

Trucks and soldiers from Naarden, Crailo and Soesterberg came to Eemnes to help. Around 5:00 pm, local time the airship was punctured. The plane was transported to Soesterberg in three trucks the next day.

The crew of the C.26 was arrested near Rotterdam and interned in "The English Camp" in Groningen until the end of the war.

The baker received 600 guilders from the British government to compensate for the damage.

On the ground, items were found that had fallen out of the gondola. The Eemnes historial society still has binoculars from the airship. Eemland Archive has a piece of the balloon. In 2019, a special exhibition was held in Eemnes about the C.26 airship by the Eemnes historial society.

During a remembrance service in Devizes in November 2018, coxswain of the C.26 petty officer Arthur Townsend was re-created at the front of the church in coloured sand by rangoli artist Milan Arvindkumar.
