= 1944 Zegveld Boeing B-17 Flying Fortress crash =

1944 crash of an American B-17 bomber in Zegveld, Netherlands

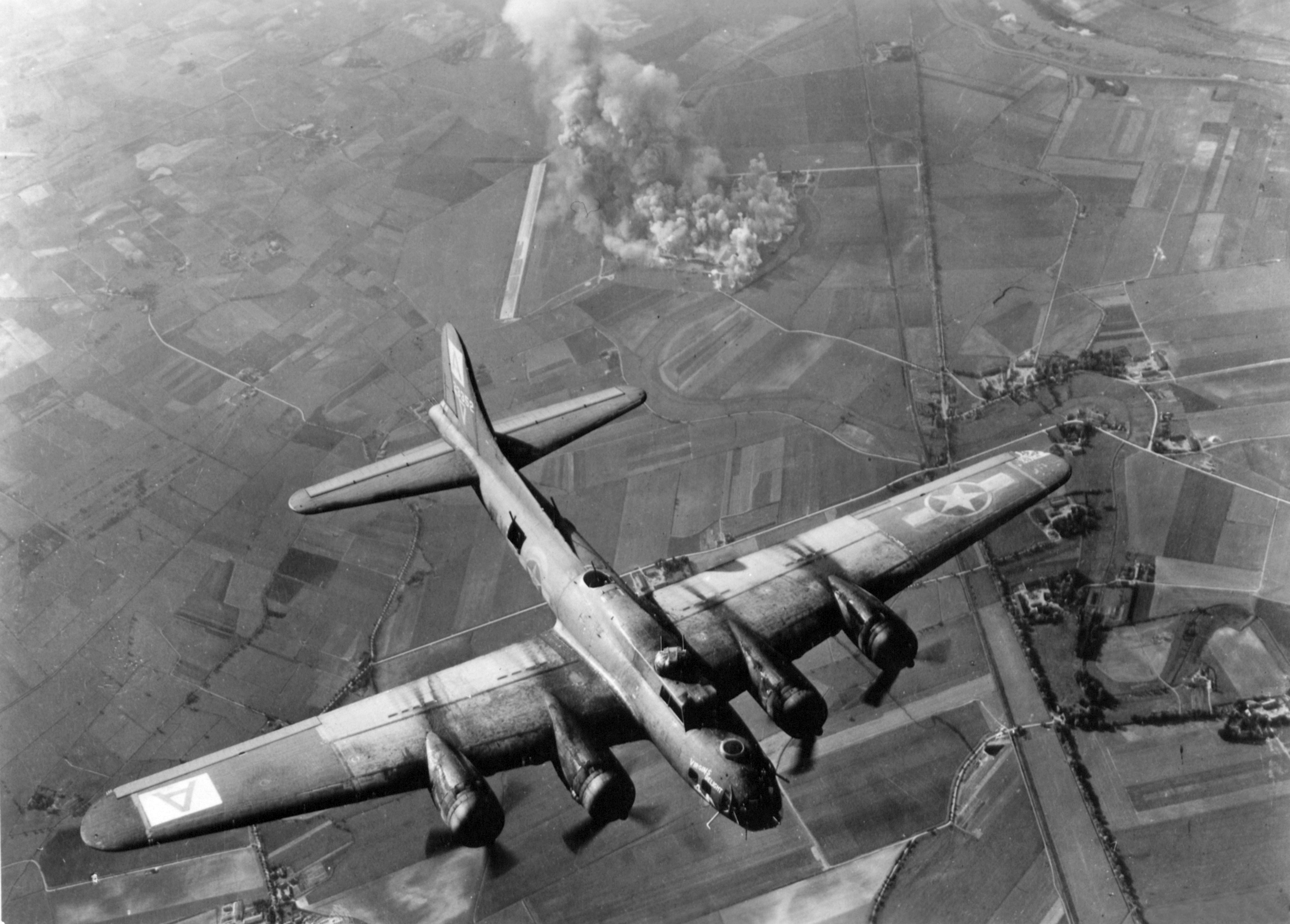
- Similar aircraft as the one involved

Occurrence
- Date: 21 February 1944
- Summary: Shot down by German fighter aircraft after bombing mission over Braunschweig
- Site: Zegveld, Netherlands

Aircraft
- Aircraft type: Boeing B-17F-65-DL Flying Fortress
- Aircraft name: San Antonio Rose
- Operator: United States Army Air Forces
- Registration: 42-3462
- Flight origin: Horham Airfield, England
- Destination: over Braunschweig, Germany; back to Horham Airfield, England
- Crew: 10
- Fatalities: 8
- Survivors: 2

The 1944 Zegveld Boeing B-17 Flying Fortress crash was a crash of the American Boeing B-17 Flying Fortress bomber San Antonio Rose near the village of Zegveld, Netherlands, on 21 February 1944, during World War II. The aircraft was returning from a bombing mission over Braunschweig, Germany, when it was attacked by German fighters and crashed in a field. Eight crew members died, and two survived as prisoners of war.

In Zegveld a memorial is placed near the crash location. In 2020 an exhibition about the crash has been held. Historian Jeroen van der Kamp spent seven years researching the incident and wrote a book about it and gave lectures about it.

== Background ==
The B-17 San Antonio Rose was operated by the United States Army Air Forces and departed from Horham Airfield in England on the morning of 21 February 1944. The ten-man crew had trained together in Rapid City, South Dakota, and previously completed five successful missions over France and Germany.

== Attack and crash ==
On 21 February 1944 their target was an aircraft factory in Braunschweig, Germany. After encountering flak en route, one of the aircraft's engines was damaged. Despite this, the pilot, Morris Marks, and the crew continued and successfully dropped their bombs. Separated from the rest of the formation, the bomber became an easy target. Over the Netherlands, with no cloud cover remaining, the B-17 was attacked and heavily damaged by German fighter aircraft. The aircraft crashed in a field near the Hazekade in Zegveld, close to the Molenweg.

== Victims ==
Eight crew members were killed in the crash. Two of them, Amberg and Hines, are buried at the Netherlands American Cemetery in Margraten. The others were either repatriated post-war or buried at other locations.

Only two crew members, Charles Barnthson and Barclay Glover, managed to parachute to safety. They landed near Zegveld and were assisted by local farmer Cornelis Bol and village doctor Roskott. The four were arrested by German forces shortly afterward. Barnthson and Glover were taken as prisoners of war. Bol and Roskott were imprisoned for several months in Camp Amersfoort for aiding the Americans.

== Commemoration ==
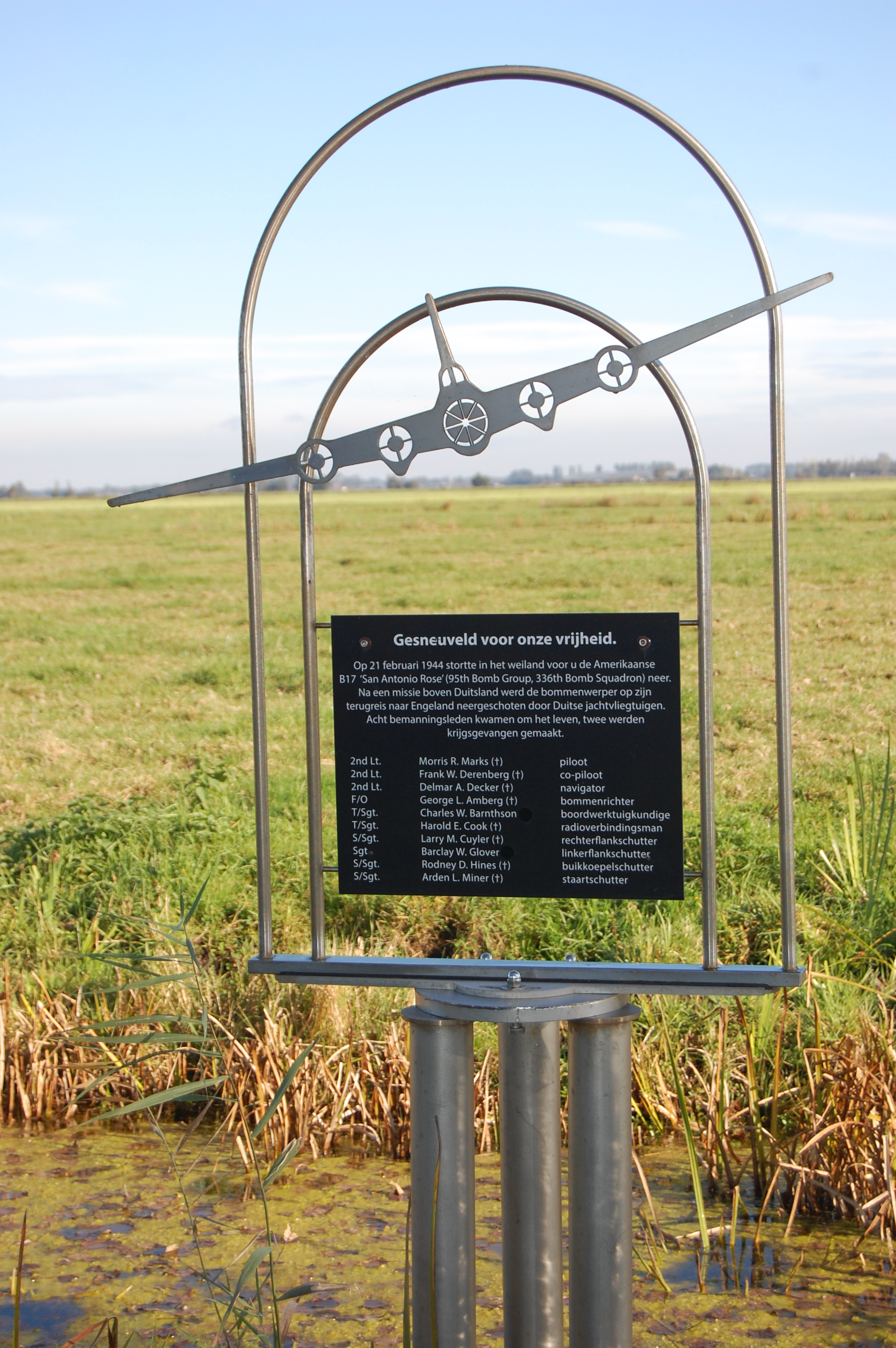
War memorial commemorating the eight crew members who died in the crash

A monument commemorating the eight crew members who died was unveiled on 8 October 2015 along the Hazekade in Zegveld. The memorial lists the names of all ten crew members and serves as a local site of remembrance and was designed and built by Wout Verweij.

In February 2020, a public exhibition was held at De Milandhof in Zegveld. The exhibition featured aircraft parts, photos, and original documents from the flight and crash. Julie Moore, the niece of one of the fallen crew members, attended the 2020 memorial in Zegveld. Her visit was described as deeply emotional and a powerful moment of transatlantic remembrance.

Historian Jeroen van der Kamp spent seven years researching the incident and wrote the book Ik verwacht tegen juni terug te zijn (translated: "I Expect to Be Back by June") about it. It was presented during the 2020 exhibition. In September 2021, invited by the Stichts-Hollandse Historical Society, Van der Kamp also gave a lecture about the crash in Woerden.
