= List of KLM accidents and incidents =

This is a list of accidents and incidents involving Dutch airline KLM. The airline has suffered 64 incidents since 1921.

== Notable incidents with fatalities ==
=== 1920s ===
- 24 April 1924 – 1924 KLM Fokker F.III disappearance: Fokker F.III H-NABS disappeared while on a Lympne–Rotterdam flight with three on board; the aircraft probably struck the water at full speed while flying under fog. All KLM aircraft were required to be equipped with radio communication systems as a result of this accident.
- 25 June 1925 – 1925 KLM Fokker F.III Forêt de Mormal crash: Fokker F.III H-NABM struck trees and crashed at Locquignol, France, while flying too low in poor visibility, killing all four on board.
- 9 July 1926: 1926 KLM Fokker F.VII crash: Fokker F.VII H-NACC crashed in thick fog near Wolverthem, Belgium, while attempting to land, killing the pilot and passenger.
- 22 August 1927 – 1927 KLM Fokker F.VIII crash: Fokker F.VIII H-NADU crashed near Sevenoaks, England, following failure of the tailfin and rudder. One crewmember was killed.
- 24 July 1928 – 1928 KLM Fokker F.III Waalhaven crash: Fokker F.III H-NABR stalled and crashed at Waalhaven after striking several ship masts after takeoff; one passenger drowned when the fuselage sank. The pilot had experience in the Fokker F.VII and not the F.III and began the takeoff too early.

=== 1930s ===
- 6 December 1931 – 1931 Bangkok KLM Fokker F.VIIb-3m crash: Fokker F.VII PH-AFO Ooievaar crashed at Bangkok while attempting to take off, killing three of seven on board. A ventilation hatch above the cockpit opened which spoiled lift and prevented the aircraft from taking off. The plane departed the end of the runway, struck a berm, and came to rest upside down in a rice field.
- 20 December 1934 – 1934 KLM Douglas DC-2 crash: Douglas DC-2-115A PH-AJU Uiver crashed at Rutbah Wells, Iraq, killing all occupants. The aircraft had participated in the MacRobertson Air Race in October 1934, and won the handicap division. It was on its first flight after return from the race and was en route to the Netherlands East Indies carrying Christmas mail when it crashed.
- 6 April 1935: Flight 676, operated by Fokker F.XII PH-AFL Leeuwerik, struck a mountain 15 km (9 mi) from Brilon, Germany while flying too low, killing all seven on board. The aircraft was flying low, possibly so the pilot could maintain visual contact with the ground. The aircraft entered a valley and encountered heavy snow, but could not get out of the valley and it crashed.
- 14 July 1935 – 1935 Amsterdam Fokker F.XXII crash: Fokker F.XXII PH-AJQ Kwikstaart crashed and burned just outside Schiphol after both left side engines failed due to a defect in the fuel system, killing four crew and two passengers. Fourteen occupants survived. More powerful fuel pumps were installed in the Fokker F.XXII and the hand pump was changed so that it could be used regardless of the fuel tap position. Similar aircraft types were also removed from service and changes were made so that this type of failure would not happen again.
- 20 July 1935 – 1935 San Giacomo Douglas DC-2 crash: Douglas DC-2-115E PH-AKG Gaai crashed near the San Bernardino Pass near Pian San Giacomo due to wing and fuselage icing, killing all three crew and all 10 passengers.
- 18 December 1935: Koolhoven F.K.43 PH-AJJ collided in mid-air with a LVA Fokker C.I (526) over Schiphol Airport; the FK.43 lost control and crashed, killing the pilot; the C.I also crashed, but its pilot survived.
- 9 December 1936 - 1936 KLM Croydon accident: Douglas DC-2-115E PH-AKL Lijster lost control and crashed into a house after taking off from Croydon Airport, killing 15 of the 17 people on board, including Juan de la Cierva, inventor of the autogyro.
- 3 April 1937: Douglas DC-3-194B PH-ALP Pluvier was being delivered to KLM when it struck Mount Baldy, Arizona in poor weather, killing all eight on board.
- 28 July 1937 – 1937 Beert KLM Douglas DC-2 crash: Douglas DC-2-115L PH-ALF Flamingo crashed in a field near Beert, Belgium following an unexplained in-flight fire and mid-air explosion, killing all 15 on board. The cause of the fire was not determined, but it likely began in the cabin. Following this accident, non-combustible paneling and paint would be used on all Douglas aircraft. KLM also made changes to prevent sparks coming in contact with fuel.
- 6 October 1937: Douglas DC-3-194B PH-ALS Specht crashed on take-off from Talang Betoetoe Airport following engine failure, killing four of 11 on board.
- 14 November 1938 - 1938 Amsterdam KLM Douglas DC-3 crash1938 Amsterdam KLM Douglas DC-3 crash: Douglas DC-3-194D PH-ARY IJsvogel struck the ground and crashed while on approach to Schiphol Airport for reasons unknown, killing six of 19 on board. Crew errors were blamed. Following this accident, it was recommended that some instruments be made more visible in all DC-3 cockpits.
- 9 December 1938 - 1938 Lockheed 14 Schiphol crash: Lockheed 14-WF62 Super Electra PH-APE Ekster crashed on takeoff from Schiphol Airport during a training flight after the pilot switched off the right engine too soon, killing the four crew. KLM adjusted its training schedule after this accident.
- 6 June 1939: During a training flight of the Douglas DC-2 PH-AKN Nachtegaal near Schiphol, an instructor's deviation of from the lesson plan; turning off an engine; led to an emergency landing in which the aircraft crashed into a military guard post, killing one soldier and injuring five, while the crew survived unharmed.
- 10 June 1939: Koolhoven F.K.43 PH-AJK Krekel stalled and crashed at Vlissingen, killing all three on board.
- 26 September 1939 - Shooting of the Mees: Douglas DC-3-194G PH-ASM Mees was flying from Malmö to Amsterdam when it was attacked by a German fighter over the North Sea, killing one of 12 on board. Despite being hit by 65 bullets, the aircraft was able to land sately at Schiphol Airport. Following this incident, all KLM aircraft were repainted yellow with "HOLLAND" in capital letters on the fuselage (Netherlands was neutral at the time).

=== 1940s ===
- 14 November 1946 - 1946 Amsterdam KLM Douglas C-47 crash: Douglas C-47A PH-TBW crashed at Schiphol Airport following repeated attempts to land in poor weather, killing all 26 on board, including Dutch writer Herman de Man.
- 26 January 1947 - 1947 KLM Douglas DC-3 crash: Douglas DC-3C PH-TCR pitched up, stalled and crashed after takeoff from Copenhagen, killing all 22 on board, including Prince Gustaf Adolf of Sweden, American actress and singer Grace Moore and Danish film actress Gerda Neumann. An airport employee had forgotten to remove the gust locks securing the elevators.
- 20 October 1948 - 1948 KLM Constellation air disaster: Lockheed L-049 Constellation PH-TEN Nijmegen crashed near Prestwick, Scotland due to crew errors, killing all 40 aboard.
- 23 June 1949 - 1949 KLM Lockheed Constellation crash: Lockheed L-749-79-33 Constellation PH-TER Roermond, piloted by Hans Plesman—the son of CEO Albert Plesman—broke apart and crashed into the sea off Bari after it entered a high speed dive for unknown reasons, probably due to autopilot failure, killing all 33 on board.
- 12 July 1949: - India KLM Lockheed L-749 air disaster: Lockheed L-749-79-33 Constellation PH-TDF Franeker crashed into a 674-foot (205 m) hill in Jagruti Nagar, Ghatkopar, near Bombay (now Mumbai), India due to pilot error (although sabotage was not ruled out), killing all 45 aboard. 13 American news correspondents died, including the radio commentator H.R. Knickerbocker.

=== 1950–1977 ===
- 2 February 1950: Douglas C-47A PH-TEU crashed in the North Sea 40 mi (64 km) off the Dutch coast following an unexplained in-flight fire, killing all seven on board. The aircraft was operating an Amsterdam-London passenger service. A Danish ship captain stated that an engine was on fire when the aircraft came down.
- 22 March 1952: Flight 592, operated by Douglas DC-6 Koningin Juliana, crashed at Frankfurt while flying too low for reasons unknown, killing 45 of the 47 occupants.
- 23 August 1954: Flight 608, operated by Douglas DC-6B Willem Bontekoe, crashed between Shannon, Ireland, and Schiphol in the North Sea, 40 kilometres (25 mi) from IJmuiden for reasons unknown, killing all 21 on board.
- 5 September 1954: Flight 633, operated by Lockheed L-1049C-55-81 Super Constellation Triton, ditched in the River Shannon after takeoff from Shannon Airport. Twenty eight of the 56 people on board (46 passengers and 10 crew) were killed.
- 16 July 1957: Flight 844, operated by Lockheed L-1049C-55-81 Super Constellation Neutron, crashed in the sea near Biak, after takeoff from Mokmer Airport at Biak on its way to Manila. The pilot made a low farewell pass over the island, but the aircraft lost altitude, crashed into the sea and exploded, killing 48 of 58 on board.
- 14 August 1958: Flight 607-E, operated by L-1049H-01-06-162 Super Constellation Hugo de Groot flying from Amsterdam to New York via Shannon, crashed into the ocean 180 kilometres (110 mi) off the coast of County Galway, Ireland for reasons unknown, probably due to an overspeeding propeller, killing all 99 on board.
- 19 February 1958: Flight 543, operated by Douglas DC-6B PH-DFK Jan Huygen van Linschoten, ran off the runway while landing at Almaza Airport, Egypt. The co-pilot died after he was struck by the still-rotating number one propeller when he escaped the aircraft through an emergency window. The aircraft was repaired and returned to service.
- 12 June 1961: Flight 823, operated by Lockheed L-188C Electra Sirius, crashed on approach to Cairo International Airport due to pilot error, killing 20 of 36 on board.
- 25 October 1968: KLM Aerocarto Douglas C-47A PH-DAA flew into Tafelberg Mountain, Suriname, following an engine failure while on a survey flight. The aircraft collided with the mountain in cloudy conditions, killing three of the five people on board.
- 27 March 1977: Flight 4805 collided on the runway with Pan Am Flight 1736 in heavy fog at Tenerife Airport, resulting in 583 fatalities. Both aircraft were 747s. Although the Pan American 747 had 61 survivors, all aboard the KLM aircraft perished.

=== 1990s ===
- 4 April 1994: Flight 433, operated by a Saab 340 crashed at Amsterdam Airport Schiphol, killing three and seriously injuring nine people. A faulty warning light caused the crew to mistakenly believe that the engine suffered from low oil pressure. On final approach at a height of 90 feet (27 m), the captain decided to go around and gave full throttle, however only on the number one engine, leaving the other in-flight idle. Because of this, the aircraft rolled to the right, pitched up, stalled and hit the ground at 80 degrees bank.

=== 2020s ===
- 29 May 2024: A person died after being ingested into the engine of an Embraer 190 operating as KLM Cityhopper Flight 1341. The incident occurred on the airport's apron during pushback as the aircraft was preparing to depart for Billund. The investigation concluded that the person died by suicide.

== Notable incidents without fatalities ==
- 18 May 1921: Fokker F.III H-NABK (c/n 1507) suffered landing gear failure on takeoff from Hamburg due to a poor runway surface; all three on board survived.
- 21 May 1921: Fokker F.III H-NABL (c/n 1508) crashed and flipped upside down at Hekelingen, South Holland while attempting an unexplained emergency landing; all three on board survived. Although the aircraft was written off, it was rebuilt as c/n 1533 with the same registration.
- 2 September 1921: de Havilland DH.9B H-NABP crashed at Waalhaven while attempting an emergency landing following an engine fire; the pilot survived. This was the first official accident involving a KLM aircraft.
- 26 October 1921: Fokker F.III H-NABL (c/n 1533) crashed while on approach to Rotterdam from London. The aircraft landed in low visibility, struck the ground and crashed upside down. The pilot, the sole occupant, survived and although the aircraft was written off, it was rebuilt as c/n 1530, re-registered H-NABR and returned to service, but was destroyed in a 1928 crash.
- 17 May 1922: Fokker F.III H-NABT struck a tree and crashed at Hythe, Kent in poor visibility while on approach to Croydon; all four on board survived.
- 17 July 1923: Fokker F.III H-NABM stalled and crashed while on approach to Croydon Airport after the engine lost power; all four on board survived. The aircraft was written off and salvaged for parts.
- 29 October 1923: Fokker F.III H-NABH struck a sand bank at Goodwind Sands, Kent following engine failure; all four on board survived. The radiator had failed, causing the engine to quit.
- 4 November 1925: Fokker F.III H-NABI crashed in an open field at Hamburg shortly after takeoff in poor weather; all three on board survived.
- 21 June 1926: Fokker F.VII H-NACL ditched in the English Channel off Hythe, Kent following engine failure, all five on board survived. The pilot had forgotten to open the fuel valve.
- 12 July 1927: Fokker F.VIIa H-NADQ crashed at Boisdinghem, Pas-de-Calais while attempting an emergency landing following mechanical failure; all eight on board survived.
- 11 April 1928: Fokker F.VIII H-NAEE crashed at Nigtevecht while on approach to Amsterdam following engine failure; all 11 on board survived.
- 2 October 1928: Fokker F.VIIb/3m H-NAFC made an emergency landing at a race track at Cawnpore, India due to fuel exhaustion; all three on board survived.
- 19 October 1929: Fokker F.VIIb/3m PH-AGB struck trees and crashed in hilly terrain near Konia, Istanbul while attempting to return to Istanbul following left engine failure; all three crew survived.
- 19 February 1931: Fokker F.VII PH-AFO Ooievaar made an emergency landing in heavy fog in Czechoslovakia, overturning on snowy terrain but leaving all aboard unharmed, after which the aircraft was recovered, repaired, and returned to service. Although the aircraft was repaired and returned to service, it was lost in a crash four months later.
- 4 August 1931: Fokker F.IX PH-AFK suffered a loss of power on the left engine shortly after takeoff from Waalhaven Airport. The pilot decided to continue but while flying over a shipyard the engine failed completely and the aircraft lost altitude. While returning to the airport the aircraft struck a 13 m (43 ft) tall marine beacon, tearing off a portion the left wing. Control was lost and the aircraft crashed on a rail line just outside the airport. All 15 on board survived but several people were injured, including a bystander on the ground. The cause of the engine failure was not determined, but fuel system problems were not ruled out.
- 26 May 1933: Koolhoven F.K.43 PH-AIL Luis stalled and crashed at Groningen during a training flight following a loss of control while in a left turn; both pilots survived.
- 26 October 1934: Pander PH-OST "Panderjager" crashed during the London–Melbourne Race after colliding with a moving light beacon during a nighttime takeoff in Allahabad, catching fire and being destroyed, while the crew survived with injuries.
- 17 July 1935 - 1935 Bushehr KLM Douglas DC-2 crash: The Douglas DC-2 PH-AKM Maraboe was destroyed by fire after a rough, uneven runway caused severe damage during a nighttime takeoff from Bushir, though all passengers and crew escaped unharmed.
- 15 July 1936: Fokker F.VIIb/3m PH-AEZ Zwaluw lost control and crashed upside down while taxiing at Haamstede after encountering strong winds in a storm; all three crew survived. The aircraft was being moved to a safe place due to threatening weather at the airport when the accident occurred.
- 7 May 1937: Douglas DC-2-115E PH-AKI Kievit made an emergency landing on a beach near Glyfada, Greece; all 11 on board survived. The Athens area was experiencing a severe thunderstorm at the time of the incident.
- 17 December 1937: Koolhoven F.K.43 PH-AKC Citroenvlinder stalled and crashed at Groningen during a training flight; both pilots survived.
- 6 June 1939: Douglas DC-2 PH-AKN Nachtegaal crashed at Schiphol Airport during a single-engine training flight, killing one person on the ground; all four crew survived. The aircraft was rebuilt and returned to service until it was destroyed in a German air raid on 10 May 1940.
- 10 May 1940: During the German invasion of the Netherlands, nine KLM aircraft (Note: DC-2-115L PH-ALD Djalak, DC-2-115E PH-AKN Nachtegaal, DC-2-115E PH-AKO Oeverzwaluw, DC-2-115E PH-AKP Perkoetoet, DC-2-115E PH-AKK Koetilang, DC-3-194F PH-AST Tapuit, DC-3-194F PH-ASP Patrijs, DC-3-194D PH-ARX Xema & DC-3-194B PH-ALU Uil) were destroyed in a German air raid at Schiphol Airport by aircraft from KG 4. Carley Jumbo PH-AFI, Fokker F.VII PH-ACJ, Fokker F.VIIa PH-AEB, Fokker F.VIIa PH-ACT, Koolhoven FK.43 PH-AJL, Koolhoven FK.43 PH-AKB, and Koolhoven FK.48 PH-AJX were also destroyed at Schiphol Airport by German bombing. Fokker F.VIII PH-OTO was destroyed by German bombing at Waalhaven Airfield.
- 29 December 1941: KNILM Douglas DC-3 PK-ALN Nandoe (formerly KLM PH-ALN) was destroyed on the ground by Japanese fighters at Medan, North Sumatra, Dutch East Indies, however there were no occupants on board.
- 6 November 1946: Douglas C-47A PH-TBO crashed near Shere on approach to Croydon Airport after a flight from Amsterdam. All 20 passengers and crew survived the accident, six of them with injuries. The altimeter had been set incorrectly.
- 27 December 1947: Douglas C-47A PH-TCV crashed near Leeuwarden after the left wing struck a church steeple; the aircraft belly-landed and skidded across some ditches which broke off both propellers. All 15 on board survived.
- 8 March 1948: Boeing Canada PB2B-1 Canso PK-CTC crashed shortly after takeoff from Poso, Indonesia; all 13 on board survived.
- 1 May 1948: Douglas DC-6 PH-TKW Koningin Wilhelmina skidded off the runway and crashed at Schiphol Airport during a training flight due to possible propeller control problems; all five crew survived, but the brand-new aircraft was written off.
- June 16, 1948: Douglas DC-4-1009 PH-TCF Friesland stalled and crashed short of the runway at Schiphol Airport due to pilot error; all 27 on board survived. The pilot had adopted an incorrect approach configuration with an approach speed that was too low with full flaps selected, causing the aircraft to stall.
- 23 March 1952: Lockheed L-749A Constellation PH-TFF Venlo suffered a No. 3 propeller fatigue failure and subsequent engine fire during landing in Bangkok. All 44 passengers and crew escaped shortly before the fire completely consumed the aircraft. A Thai ground crewman ran into the burning aircraft and returned with an infant who had been left behind.
- 1 January 1953: Douglas C-54B PH-TDL Groningen force-landed in the desert 17 miles from Dhahran Airport due to fuel exhaustion after the crew diverted twice due to poor visibility. All 66 passengers and crew on board survived. The pilot was later reprimanded by KLM and temporarily demoted to co-pilot.
- 25 May 1953: Convair CV-240-4 PH-TEI Paulus Potter lost altitude and stalled just after takeoff from Schiphol Airport. The aircraft belly-landed on the runway and slid off, crossed a road and came to rest in a field. All 34 passengers and crew survived, however, two people who were watching the aircraft died when the aircraft crossed the road. The cause of the crash was not determined, but elevator control problems were blamed.
- 11 June 1961: While flying over the Atlantic Ocean at 17000 feet en route to Prestwick, a vibration developed in the number one engine and propeller of Flight 756, operated by Douglas DC-7C PH-DSN Noordsee. Airspeed was lost and the aircraft began descending. Fifteen minutes after the vibration began, while the crew was preparing to ditch the aircraft, the engine suddenly broke loose and fell off. The aircraft continued to Prestwick where it landed safely; all 81 on board survived. The vibration was caused by a failure in the number one forward propeller shaft bearing.
- 3 June 1983: McDonnell Douglas DC-10-30 PH-DTE Wolfgang Amadeus Mozart left the runway while landing at Tocumen International Airport, causing the nosegear to collapse; all 27 on board survived. The aircraft was repaired and returned to service.
- 15 December 1989: Flight 867, operated by Boeing 747-406 City of Calgary, suffered failure of all four engines after it flew through a volcanic ash cloud from Mount Redoubt en route to Tokyo from Amsterdam. While descending the crew were able to restart the engines and the aircraft performed an emergency landing at Anchorage with no casualties to the 245 on board.
- 28 January 1994: Flight 136, a Fokker 100 (PH-KLG), landed hard at Schiphol International Airport, collapsing the right main landing gear; all 76 on board survived. The aircraft was repaired and returned to service.
- 28 November 2004: Flight 1673, operated by Boeing 737-400 PH-BTC David Livingstone, suffered a birdstrike upon rotation from Amsterdam Airport Schiphol. The aircraft continued onward to Barcelona International Airport, where the nose gear collapsed. No injuries or casualties were reported. The aircraft was written off.
- 13 December 2013: Boeing 737-8K2 PH-BXZ was struck by US Airways Flight 798, a Boeing 757, while parked at Schiphol International Airport. A computer glitch showed gate D49 (where the 737 was parked) as not in use, but it actually was as the 737 had been delayed. The 757 was cleared to taxi to gate D51, not realizing that the 737 was still there. While taxiing into position at D51, the 757's right outer wing sheared off the left winglet on the 737; the 757 suffered damage to the wing leading edge. There were no casualties.
- 13 February 2019: Flight 601, a Boeing 747-406M (PH-BFV), struck Flight 623, a Boeing 787-9 Dreamliner (PH-BHA) during pushback at Schiphol International Airport. The 747's right winglet struck the right side horizontal stabilizer on the 787. Both aircraft were grounded for repairs with the 747 returning to service three days later. The incident remains under investigation.
- 9 July 2019: Flight 1699, a Boeing 737-8K2 (PH-BXH), struck EasyJet Europe Flight U28868, an Airbus A320, during pushback at Schiphol International Airport. The A320's left winglet struck the left side elevator on the 737. Both aircraft were grounded for inspection and repairs. The incident remains under investigation.
- 21 February 2020: Flight 808, a Boeing 777-306 (PH-BVU), had a female passenger started coughing after departure from Manila. Over Russia, she suddenly felt unwell and fell into her seat. Another passenger alerted the cabin crew who provided medical assistance, a Dutch doctor helped the cabin crew to perform CPR in the aircraft galley. The flight performed an emergency landing at Stockholm Arlanda Airport at 04:50am (CET). Upon arrival the woman was pronounced dead. The severity of the emergency landing required the aircraft to undergo additional inspection.
- 15 November 2024: Flight 661, an Airbus A330-203 (PH-AOA), en route to Houston-George Bush Intercontinental Airport, returned to Amsterdam Airport Schiphol after birds were ingested into both of its engines during takeoff from runway 24. Engine vibrations were reported by the crew during the initial climb.
- 28 December 2024: Flight 1204, operated by a 24.1-year-old Boeing 737-800 (PH-BXM), flying from Oslo Airport, Gardermoen to Amsterdam Airport Schiphol, diverted to and made an emergency landing at Torp Sandefjord Airport in Norway after a loud noise was heard shortly after takeoff. The aircraft veered off the runway into the grass at low speed before coming to a safe stop. All 176 passengers and six crew members on board were unharmed. It was later determined that the aircraft had suffered a hydraulic failure. The incident is being investigated by the Norwegian Accident Investigation Board, local authorities, and KLM's technical team.

== Hijackings ==
- 16 April 1962: Douglas DC-7C PH-DSH Caribische Zee was hijacked by one man demanding to be flown to East Berlin.
- 19 March 1971: A man armed with an Uzi submachine gun, stole a car at Zanderij International Airport and drove to a parked KLM Douglas DC-8 (PH-DCM, Henry Dunant) on the apron. He boarded the aircraft and threatened a flight attendant. An hour later two border police agents boarded the aircraft and convinced the hijacker to surrender.
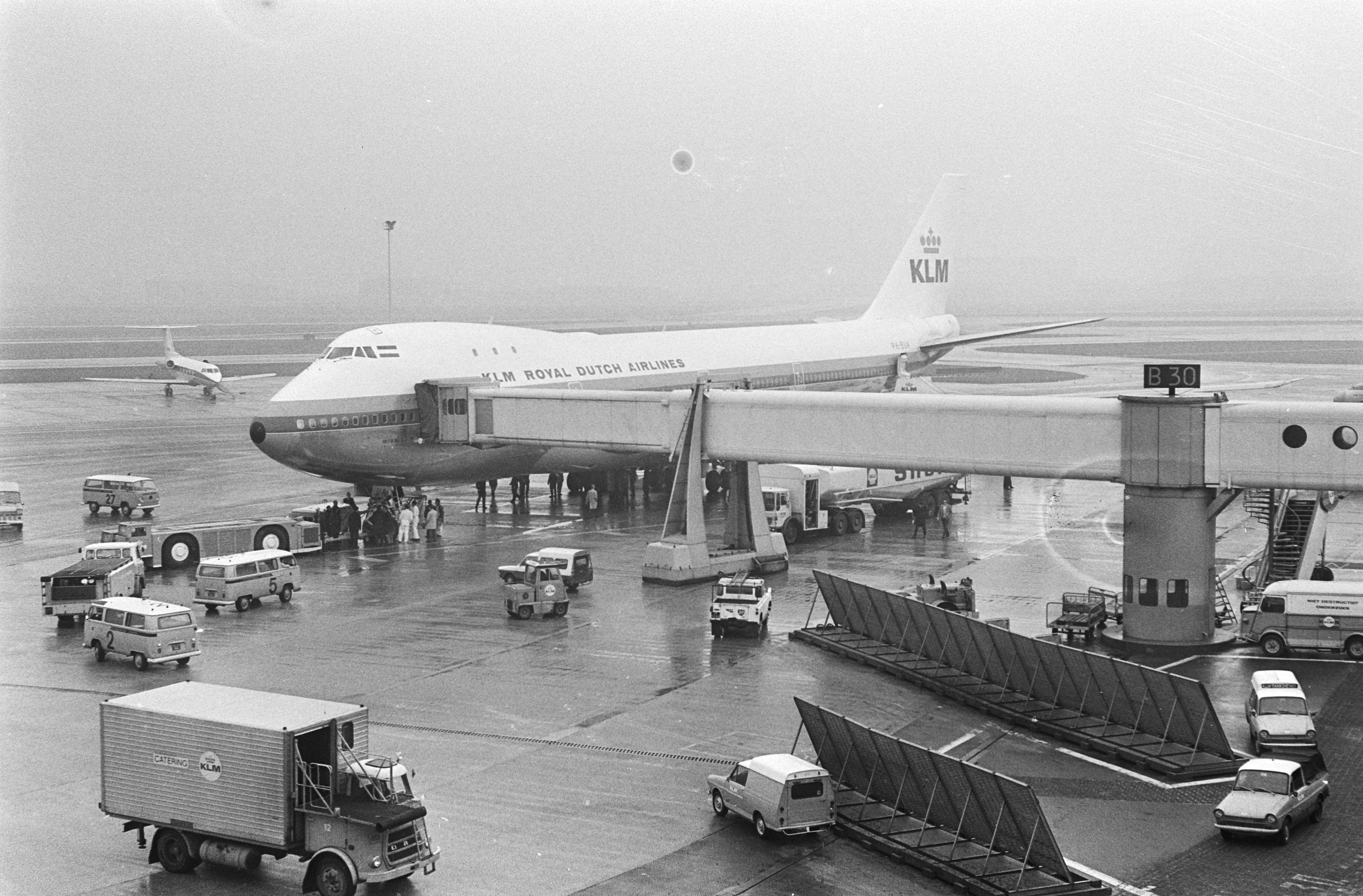
  KLM Flight 861 was one of the first hijackings of a Boeing 747. At the time of the incident, the 747, nicknamed "Mississippi" had been the first of the airline.
- 25 November 1973: Flight 861, a Boeing 747-200, was a scheduled flight from Amsterdam to Tokyo-Haneda with planned stops at Athens, Beirut, and Delhi. The airplane was en route over Iraq when it was hijacked by three passengers, claiming to be members of the Arab Youth Organization for the Liberation of Palestine. They forced the plane to Damascus, Nicosia, Tripoli, Malta, and finally Dubai where the hijackers surrendered to authorities. All 247 passengers and 17 crew survived the hijacking.
- 4 September 1976: Flight 366, operated by McDonnell Douglas DC-9-33RC PH-DNM City of Madrid flying from Malaga to Amsterdam with an intermediate stop in Nice, was hijacked shortly after takeoff from Nice by Palestinian terrorists. After aborted attempts to land in Tunis, the aircraft landed in Larnaca, Cyprus. After refuelling, the hijackers attempted to reach Palestine before the aircraft was turned around by Israeli F-4 Phantoms. After returning to Cyprus, the passengers were released unharmed and the hijackers surrendered.
- 6 August 1978: Douglas DC-9-32 PH-DNS City of Arnhem was hijacked by one person who demanded to be flown to Algiers; the hijacker was taken down.
- 23 December 1987: KLM Flight 343, a Boeing 737-306 (PH-BDE), was hijacked to Rome by a 15-year-old boy who claimed to have a bomb in his luggage. At Rome, the hijacker demanded 1 million dollars and to be flown to the US. He allowed 60 passengers to leave the aircraft while negotiations began. He was later overpowered by police when he was lured from the aircraft, ostensibly to be driven to another aircraft to be flown to New York. No weapon was found.
- 15 August 1993: Flight 110, a Boeing 737-406 (PH-BDS), was hijacked by a lone 40-year-old Egyptian man. He claimed to have a bomb and demanded to be flown to New York, apparently to force the release of Egyptian cleric Shaykh Omar Abdel Rahman, who was in custody on immigration violations. Several of Rahman's followers were charged in the 1993 World Trade Center bombing. The hijacker also demanded the UN to enforce sanctions against Serbia in the Balkan conflict. The aircraft landed at Dusseldorf, ostensibly to refuel. The hijacker released everyone on board except two crew and negotiations began. He set a deadline for the release of the Shaykh, and threatened to blow up the aircraft if this demand wasn't met. Ten hours after landing, German GSG 9 commandos stormed the aircraft and arrested the hijacker without incident.
