= Flight 823 =

Flight 823 may refer to

- Northeast Airlines Flight 823, crashed on 1 February 1957
- KLM Flight 823, crashed on 12 June 1961
- United Airlines Flight 823, had an uncontrollable fire on 9 July 1964
- Hop-A-Jet Flight 823, crashed on 9 February 2024
