= Flight 608 =

Flight 608 may refer to:

- United Airlines Flight 608, crashed on 24 October 1947
- KLM Flight 608, crashed on 23 August 1954
