= 1938 Amsterdam KLM Douglas DC-3 crash =

Aviation accident in the Netherlands in 1938

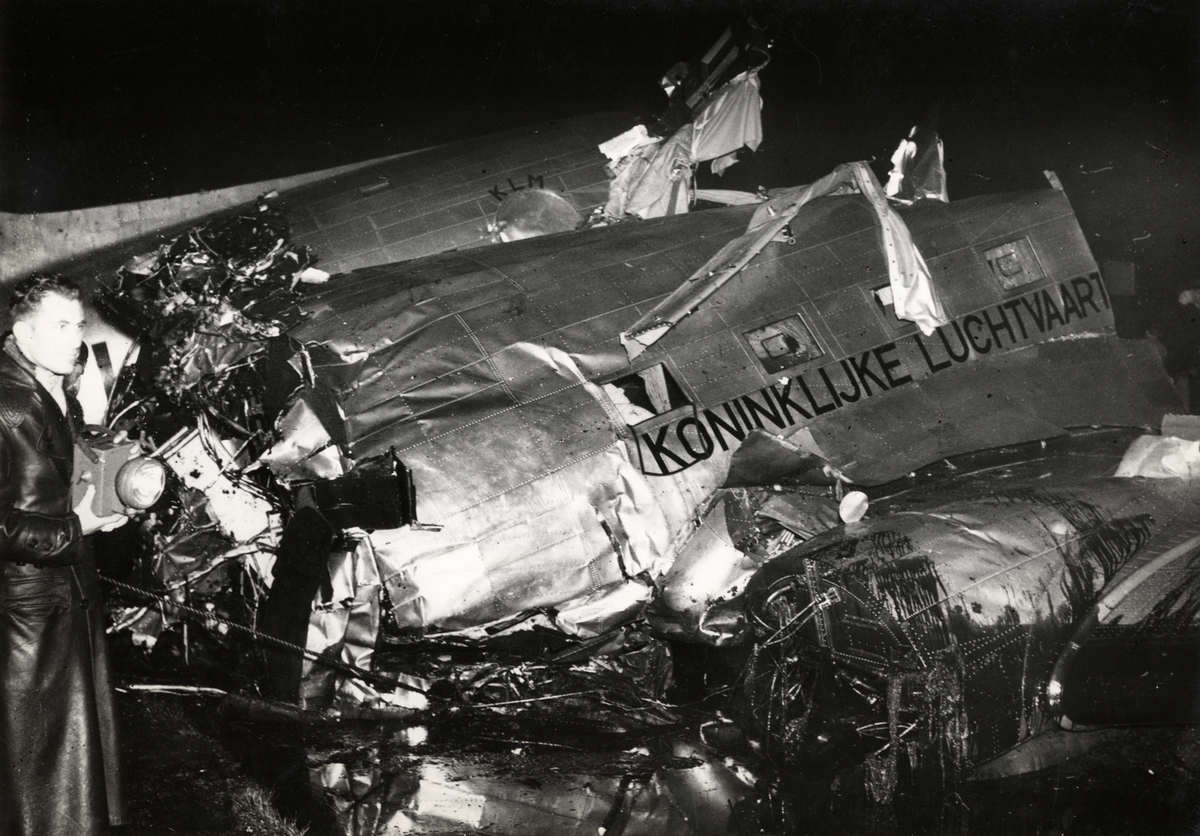
- Wreckage of the aircraft in the Riekerpolder

Occurrence
- Date: 14 November 1938
- Summary: Crashed during approach in fog; exact cause undetermined
- Site: Riekerpolder, near Schiphol Airport, Amsterdam, Netherlands

Aircraft
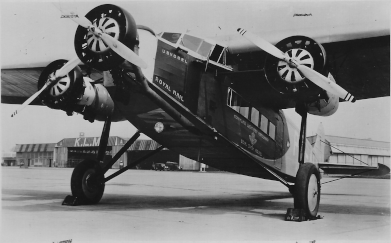
- PH-ARY IJsvogel
- Aircraft type: Douglas DC-3
- Aircraft name: IJsvogel
- Operator: KLM
- Registration: PH-ARY
- Flight origin: Berlin Tempelhof Airport, Germany
- Destination: Schiphol Airport, Netherlands
- Passengers: 14
- Crew: 5
- Fatalities: 6
- Injuries: 13
- Survivors: 13

Polygoon video of the crash

The 1938 Amsterdam KLM Douglas DC-3 crash occurred on 14 November 1938, when a KLM Douglas DC-3 named IJsvogel (registration PH-ARY) crashed while approaching Schiphol Airport after a scheduled flight from Berlin Tempelhof Airport. The aircraft struck the ground in the Riekerpolder during an approach in fog and broke apart.

Six of the 19 people on board were killed, including four of the five crew members. The only surviving crew member was the steward, while twelve passengers survived, most with injuries.

An investigation by the Dutch Council for Aviation was unable to determine the exact cause of the accident. No mechanical defects were found, and the Council concluded that although fog was present, the weather had not made a landing impossible. The investigation resulted in a recommendation that the aircraft's altimeter be positioned so that it was visible to both pilots during instrument approaches.

The accident was widely reported in the Netherlands, and Captain Jan Duimelaar was buried with full honours in Heemstede. In 2007, his grave was designated as part of the cultural-historical monument garden at the General Cemetery of Heemstede in recognition of his contribution to Dutch aviation.

The crash is among the worst air disasters of the KLM.:

== Aircraft ==
The aircraft involved was a Douglas DC-3-194D, registration PH-ARY, named IJsvogel (manufacturer's serial number 2021). It was the seventeenth of 23 DC-3 aircraft operated by KLM before the World War II.

Built by the Douglas Aircraft Company in Santa Monica, California, it was registered by KLM on 18 March 1938. The aircraft arrived in Rotterdam in a partially disassembled state on 18 April 1938, was assembled by Fokker, and entered service after arriving in Amsterdam on 25 April. The aircraft was powered by two Wright Cyclone SGR-1820 radial engines, each producing 1,000 hp (750 kW). It had a maximum takeoff weight of 10,885 kg (24,000 lb), a maximum speed of 290 km/h (180 mph), a service ceiling of 6,340 m (20,800 ft), and a range of approximately 2,100 km (1,300 mi).

== Flight and crash ==
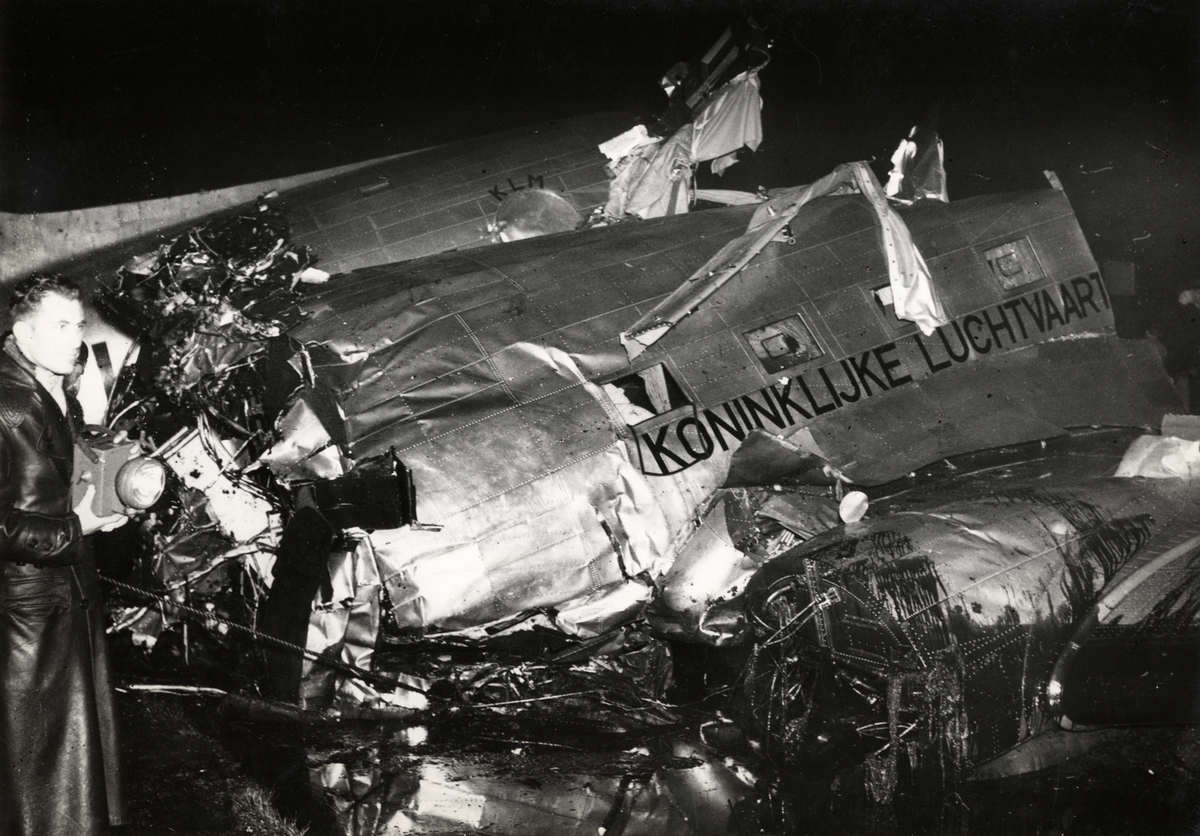
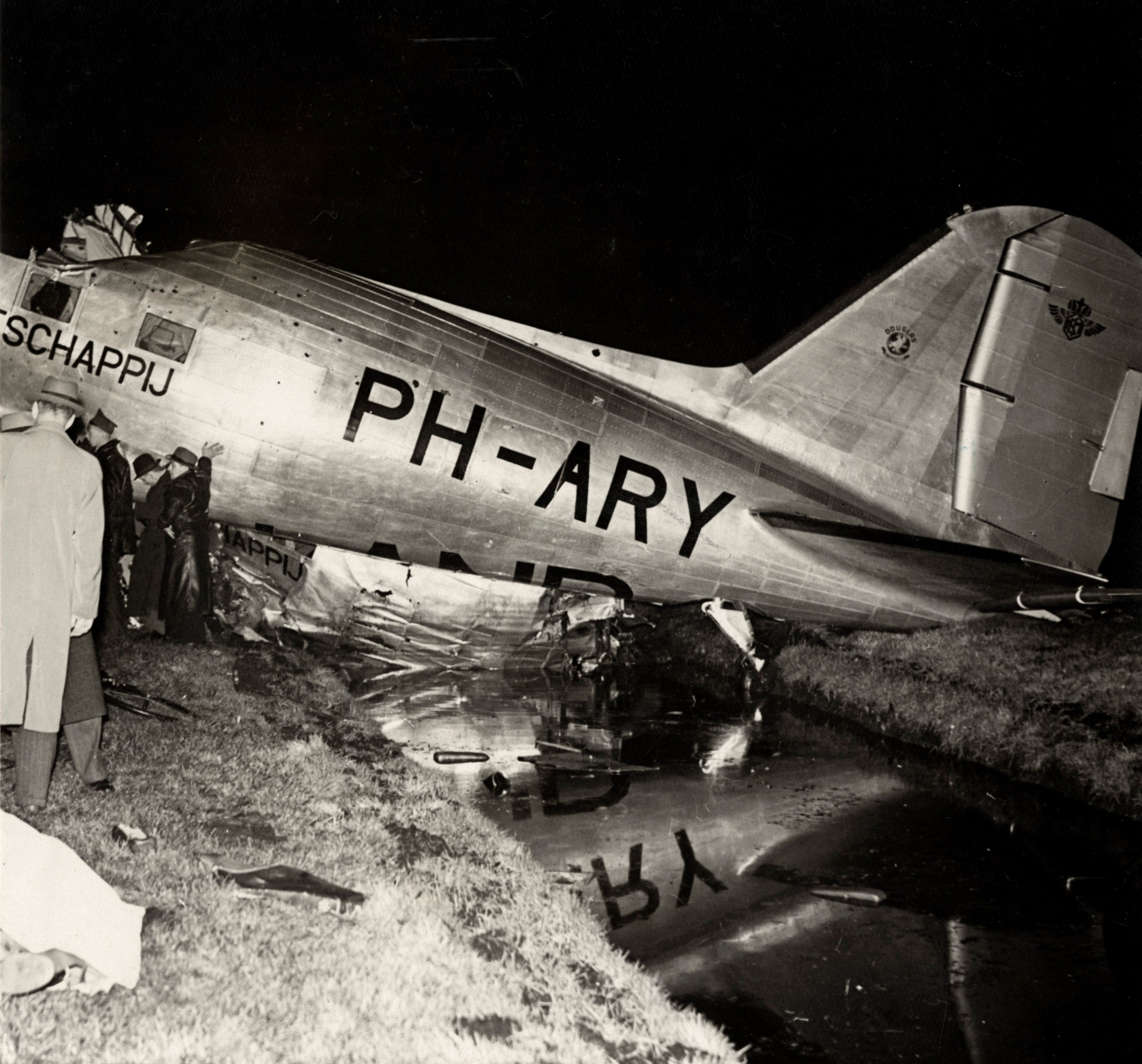
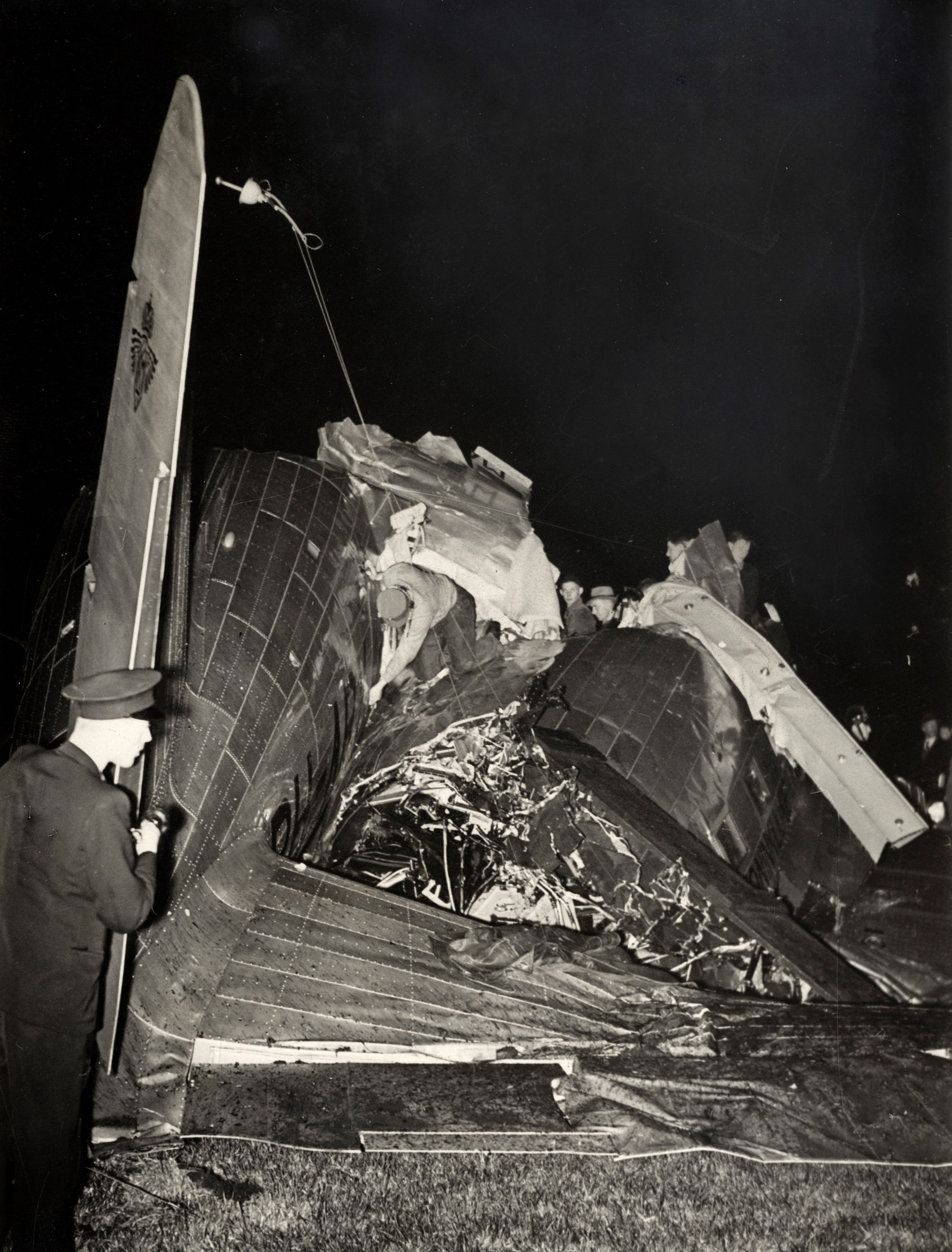
Multiple images of the disaster site

On 14 November 1938, the KLM Douglas DC-3 PH-ARY, named IJsvogel ("Kingfisher") commanded by Captain Jan Duimelaar, was operating a scheduled flight from Berlin Tempelhof Airport to Schiphol Airport after completing a return flight to Berlin. The aircraft departed Tempelhof at 16:27 and was scheduled to arrive at Schiphol at 18:20. There were 19 people on board, consisting of five crew members and 14 passengers.

As the aircraft approached Schiphol, dense fog had developed over the airport. Because a visual landing was no longer possible, the captain was instructed to use the radio beacon located on the Olympic Stadium's Marathon Tower to make a straight-in approach to the runway. Before attempting to land, the captain elected to fly one circuit over Schiphol.

During the second approach, the aircraft apparently became disoriented. Flying at an altitude of less than 30 metres (98 ft), it deviated from the intended approach path, crossed the Spijtellaantje and the old Jaagpad, and crashed into the Riekerpolder, approximately 4 kilometres (2.5 mi) from Schiphol Airport, at 18:41. The aircraft broke in two and the starboard wing had separated from the fuselage. The detached cockpit and main section of the fuselage came to rest in a drainage ditch rest pointing westward while the rear section of the fuselage slid over it.

=== Rescue operations ===
Rescue operations were hampered by dense fog and complete darkness, making it difficult for emergency services to reach the crash site. Ambulances and police vehicles also became stuck in the muddy ground, further hampering the rescue efforts. The exact number of people on board was initially unknown. The impact threw three crew members from the aircraft, while many of the injured were transported to the Wilhelmina Gasthuis in Amsterdam. Initially rescuers believed that captain Duimelaar had been taken to the hospital with the injured. After hospital staff confirmed that he was not among the casualties admitted there, a search of the wreckage was undertaken. Several hours after the crash, Duimelaar's body was discovered in the remains of the cockpit, which had come to rest in the mud. His body was recovered with considerable difficulty.

== Victims ==
There were 19 people on board: five crew members and fourteen passengers. The accident resulted in the deaths of six of the nineteen occupants. Four of the five crew members were killed. Steward B. Eys was the only crew member to survive. Twelve passengers also survived, although most sustained serious injuries. Among the passengers were several German Jews who had previously fled to the Netherlands and England, had been returned to Germany, and were travelling back to the Netherlands after being refused entry by the German authorities.

The deceased crew members were

- Captain J. J. E. Duimelaar (born 27 September 1895)
- Second pilot W. van Gemeren (aged 43). He was a Dutch military aviator and held the rank of captain and served as commander of the flying school at Soesterberg Air Base. In 1937, while a first lieutenant, he became the first pilot to land at the newly established Leeuwarden Air Base during an inspection flight. To gain experience in instrument ("blind") flying, he was seconded by the Military Aviation Service to KLM, where he flew as second pilot on night services.
- Flight engineer Willem Johannes van Huut (born 24 April 1907). After working as a civilian aircraft mechanic at the De Kooy and De Mok airfields, he joined KLM on 13 April 1931.
- Radio operator Cornelis Jan Willem van Surber (born 1 July 1902). He had served as a third mate in the merchant marine, including with the Royal Rotterdam Lloyd shipping company. He also held the rank of reserve third lieutenant in the Royal Netherlands Navy. In 1935, he began training as a radio operator with KLM and was appointed to that position on 16 April 1936.

The two passengers who died were:

- Marion Schneider-Desnitzky–Kirchbach, a German passenger travelling to Amsterdam.
- Brunhilde Weidenmann–Marx, a German Jewish refugee who, together with her husband and young daughter, had been required to return to Germany after being refused entry into the Netherlands because of irregular travel documents. After being denied entry into Germany upon arrival in Berlin, the family immediately boarded the IJsvogel for the return flight to Amsterdam. Brunhilde Weidenmann–Marx was killed in the crash, while her husband and daughter survived.

All injured passengers were admitted to the Wilhelmina Gasthuis in Amsterdam. The final injured passengers were discharged on 9 December 1938.

Following the funeral of Brunhilde Weidenmann–Marx, her husband Hellmuth Weidenmann and their daughter Inge emigrated to the United States, first settling in New York City before later moving to Los Angeles. Brunhilde's Jewish parents, Siegfried Marx and Julia Gudenberg, received exit visas on 17 November 1938 to attend their daughter's funeral. While in Amsterdam, they decided not to return to Aschaffenburg, opting instead to emigrate to the United States, where relatives were already living. As part of their preparations, they registered in Amsterdam. They remained in the city after the German invasion of the Netherlands. On 2 March 1943, they were deported to Westerbork transit camp and, three days later, to Sobibor extermination camp, where they were murdered upon arrival. Alfred and Margarete Silberstein remained registered for several months at Pension Sophia in Amsterdam before moving to London.

== Aftermath ==
All mail carried aboard the aircraft was destroyed.

The crash was commemorated by multiple sources 25 years later.

=== Burials ===
The six victims of the crash were buried on 18 November 1938 at different cemeteries. Captain Jan Duimelaar was buried in Heemstede; Marion Schneider-Desnitzky–Kirchbach and W. van Gemeren were buried at the Westerveld Cemetery in Driehuis; Brunhilde Weidenmann–Marx and W. J. van Huut were buried at Zorgvlied Cemetery in Amsterdam; and C. J. W. van Surber was buried at Crooswijk General Cemetery in Rotterdam.

==== Burial of Jan Duimelaar ====
Captain Jan Duimelaar was buried at the General Cemetery of Heemstede on 18 November 1938. The funeral was attended by a large number of mourners. Because of the large attendance, only a small proportion of those present could be accommodated inside the chapel. After the service, a procession of KLM personnel, friends and members of the public accompanied the coffin to the grave, which was covered with floral tributes.

Managing director of KLM Albert Plesman, delivered a memorial address in the cemetery chapel, paying tribute not only to Duimelaar but also to the families of the other five victims. In his eulogy, Plesman described Duimelaar as an exceptionally skilled pilot and stated his belief that the crew had encountered an unforeseen event in the final moments before the crash. He also suggested that Duimelaar's actions may have contributed to the survival of many of the passengers.

On 16 April 2007, Duimelaar's grave was incorporated into the cultural-historical monument garden at the General Cemetery of Heemstede in recognition of his contribution to the development of Dutch aviation. The grave consists of a simple black granite stele and ledger commemorating Duimelaar and his wife.

=== Investigation ===
The Dutch Council for Aviation immediately opened an investigation into the accident. In its public findings, issued on 17 August 1939 (Report No. B1A5-102), the Council concluded that the exact cause of the accident could not be determined.

The investigation found no evidence of mechanical failure, and concluded that the weather conditions, although involving fog, had not made a landing impossible. Initial suspicion centred on a possible malfunction of the aircraft's altimeter, because the aircraft had flown unusually low before impact. Examination later showed that the altimeter had functioned correctly.

The Council also expressed no doubts regarding the competence of the two pilots. During the public inquiry, however, conflicting testimony from the surviving steward and several passengers created uncertainty over which pilot had been flying the aircraft during the final approach. According to pilot Koene Dirk Parmentier, who testified as a witness, it could never be conclusively established who was flying the aircraft at the moment of the crash, a position that became the official view of KLM. Another witness, A. Viruly, considered it highly probable that Captain Van Gemeren, head of the flying school and due to return to Soesterberg after the flight, had been at the controls. The Council observed that if second pilot W. van Gemeren had been at the controls, questions could be raised because he had comparatively little experience flying the Douglas DC-3 under conditions of fog and darkness, and did not possess a Category B pilot's licence.

The investigation also examined reports that the IJsvogel had been forced to take evasive action to avoid another KLM aircraft arriving from Groningen. No evidence supporting this theory was found. However, the pilot of the Groningen flight received a reprimand for failing to comply fully with instructions issued by the control tower.

The Council also noted that one member of the crew had a physical condition that should receive greater attention during future medical examinations.

Among its recommendations, the Council advised that the aircraft's altimeter should be positioned so that it was clearly visible to both pilots rather than only to the left-seat pilot, allowing both crew members to monitor the instrument during instrument approaches.
