= KLM Flight 543 =

1958 plane crash in Egypt

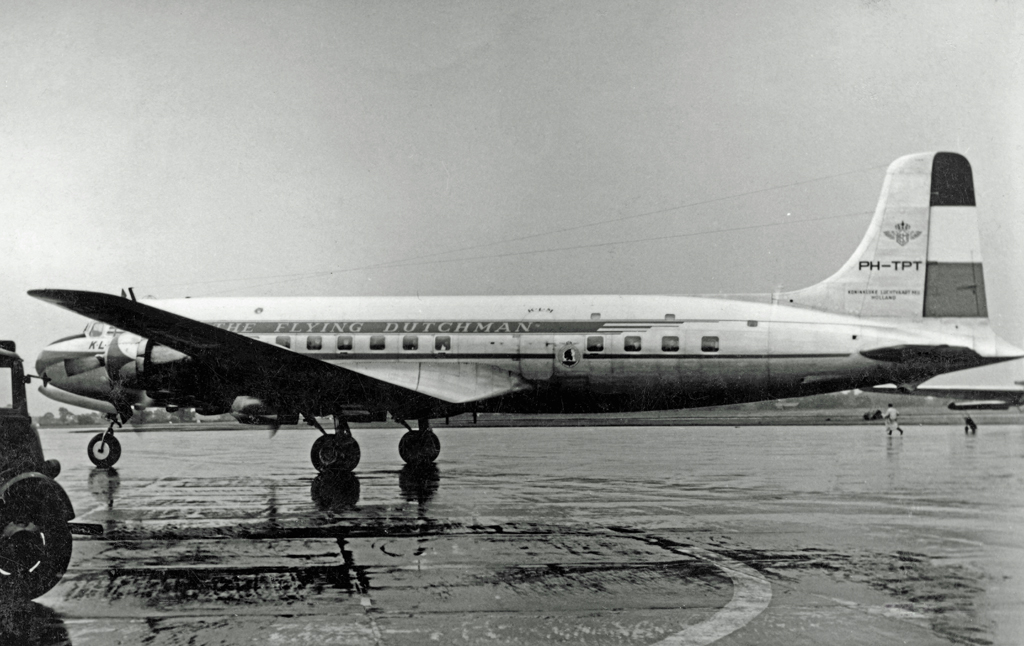
- A similar KLM DC-6

Accident
- Date: 19 February 1958
- Summary: Controlled flight into terrain on approach
- Site: Cairo-Almaza Airport, Cairo, Egypt

Aircraft
- Aircraft type: Douglas DC-6
- Aircraft name: Jan Huyghen van Linschoten
- Operator: KLM Royal Dutch Airlines
- Registration: PH-DFK
- Flight origin: Amsterdam Schiphol Airport, Netherlands
- 1st stopover: Prague Ruzyně International Airport, Czechoslovakia
- 2nd stopover: Vienna International Airport, Austria
- 3rd stopover: Ellinikon International Airport, Greece
- Last stopover: Beirut International Airport, Lebanon
- Destination: Cairo-Almaza Airport, Egypt
- Occupants: 20
- Passengers: 13
- Crew: 7
- Fatalities: 1
- Injuries: 1
- Survivors: 19

KLM Flight 543 was a scheduled international passenger service operated by KLM Royal Dutch Airlines from Amsterdam Schiphol Airport to Cairo-Almaza Airport with multiple stopovers. On 19 February 1958, the Douglas DC-6 aircraft operating the flight crashed during approach to Cairo. Although the aircraft was severely damaged, there were no fatalities among the passengers. One crew member was killed after the landing while exiting the aircraft.

== Accident ==
The aircraft, a Douglas DC-6B registered PH-DFK and named Jan Huyghen van Linschoten, was approaching Cairo-Almaza Airport at night.

During the approach to runway 34 at Cairo International Airport, the aircraft was being flown by third pilot W. J. Kroon, who was seated in the left seat and legally qualified to perform the landing, while captain H. J. Musselman occupied the right seat in a supervisory role. After completing a right-hand turn during the final approach, the Douglas DC-6B descended too low and struck a 580-foot (177 m) sand hill south of the airport. The impact tore off the propeller of engine no. 4 and severely damaged the right landing gear.

Despite the damage, captain Musselman immediately took over control of the aircraft and managed to reach the runway. Because the collision had disabled the hydraulic system, braking was no longer possible, and the electrical systems had been shut down to reduce the risk of fire. Musselman intentionally steered the aircraft off the runway and into the sand to bring it to a stop.

After the emergency landing, first officer K. Moraal exited the aircraft through the forward emergency hatch onto the wing to begin evacuation procedures. In the darkness and confusion, he accidentally walked into the still-spinning propeller of engine no. 1 and was killed instantly.

The impact caused severe structural damage, but all 13 passengers and six of the seven crew members survived. The co-pilot, First Officer Willem Jan Kroon, exited the aircraft following the crash and was fatally struck by one of the still-operating propellers.

== Investigation ==
The Dutch Civil Aviation Authority conducted an investigation into the incident and determined that the landing had been carried out with considerable negligence. There were multiple course deviations, the prescribed approach speed was exceeded, and due to an excessively steep right-hand turn, the aircraft lost altitude. Flight engineer De Koning testified that Kroon had instructed him to extend the flaps, but he had to inform Kroon that the command could not be executed because the aircraft's speed at that moment was unacceptably high.

Kroon had initially assumed he would be landing on runway 05 and was surprised when runway 34 was assigned instead. The right-hand turn required for this approach, combined with his position in the left-hand seat, made the landing more challenging. He did not begin preparing for an approach to runway 34 with the appropriate chart until after completing the turn.

It was concluded that the crash resulted from inadequate approach planning by the co-pilot and a lack of sufficient oversight by the captain. The crew had descended below a safe altitude during final approach, possibly due to misjudgment of terrain and poor visibility at night. The downward slope of the runway may also have contributed to the misperception of the aircraft's altitude.

Investigators concluded that the accident would not have occurred if the aircraft had flown just one meter higher. Conversely, it was noted that had the aircraft flown one meter lower, the consequences could have been catastrophic. The investigation commission commended Captain Musselman for his rapid and effective response after the aircraft struck the terrain. His performance in safely landing the damaged aircraft was described as exceptional. However, the commission also found that Musselman shared partial responsibility for the collision with the terrain, citing insufficient supervision of the third pilot Kroon and inadequate monitoring of the altimeter readings.

The investigation further revealed that runway 34 at Cairo-Almaza Airport had a downward slope. While the elevation at the threshold was approximately 311 feet (95 meters), the elevation at the opposite end was only 194 feet (59 meters). This slope created the illusion of a shorter runway when viewed from approach altitude, potentially causing pilots, even when at the correct altitude, to perceive themselves as flying lower than they actually were.

On 6 February 1959, the Dutch aviation safety authority published its final report on the accident. It concluded that a poorly executed approach procedure, insufficient preparation by Kroon, and inadequate vigilance and oversight by Musselman contributed to the accident. Both pilots were criticized for not paying enough attention to the altimeter readings and the elevation of the surrounding terrain.

== Aftermath ==
=== Personal consequences ===
Following the incident, KLM implemented changes to its operational procedures. Notably, second officers were no longer permitted to conduct landings at night without direct supervision by the captain. Captain Harold Musselman, who had logged over 10,000 flying hours, received a temporary suspension of his flying license for 14 days in 1959.

=== Aircraft ===
Despite the damage sustained in the accident, the aircraft was repaired and returned to service.

=== Cairo airport safety ===
Following the crash, concerns about the safety of Cairo International Airport increased significantly. Pilots criticized the dangerous terrain south of runway 34, particularly a 1,300-metre hill. Additional complaints included inadequate landing beacons, poor approach guidance, deteriorated runway conditions, and unreliable air traffic control instructions. IFALPA warned that unless Egyptian authorities improved the airport's facilities and procedures, coordinated action by international pilots could follow. After the crash runway 34 was closed for three years until 1961; after another similar KLM accident occurred, KLM Flight 823, in June.

The International Federation of Air Line Pilots' Associations (IFALPA), which included the Dutch KLM pilots' association, considered calling for a boycott of the airport, arguing that it no longer met International Civil Aviation Organization (ICAO) safety standards.
