= 1948 KLM Constellation air disaster =

Aviation accident in Prestwick, Scotland

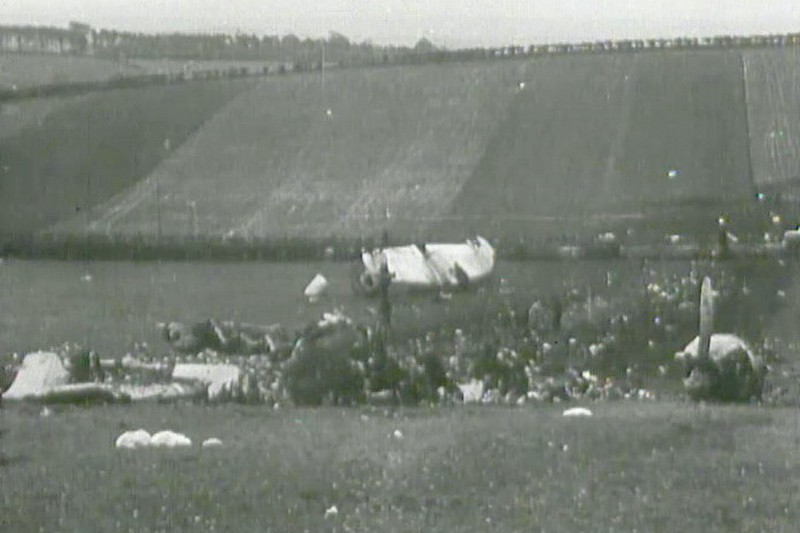
- The crash site of the KLM

Accident
- Date: 20 October 1948
- Summary: Controlled flight into terrain
- Site: Prestwick, Scotland; 55.5084°N 4.5044°W

Aircraft
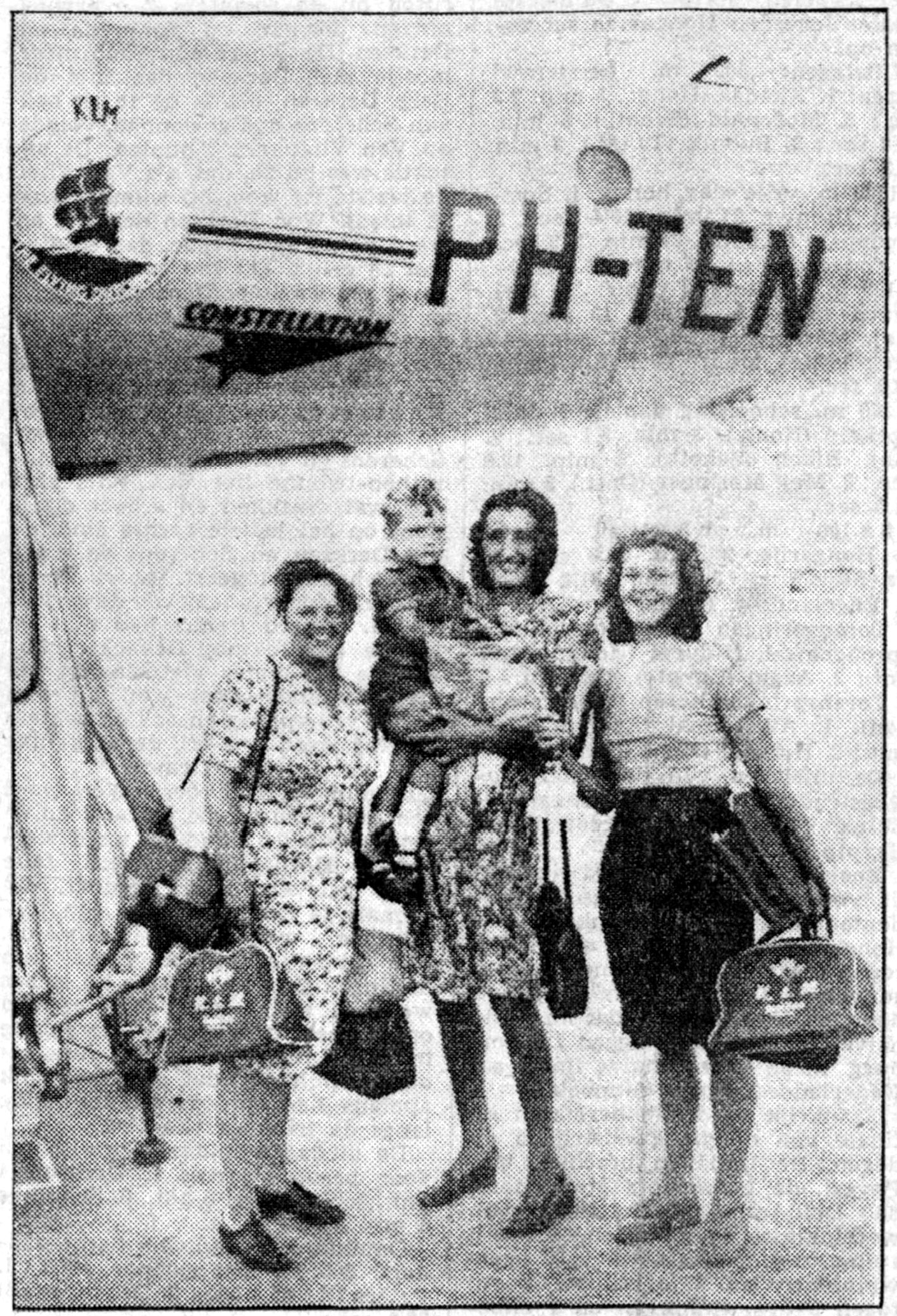
- Two Dutch swimmers and their families posing in front of the aircraft involved
- Aircraft type: Lockheed L-049-46-25 Constellation
- Aircraft name: Nijmegen
- Operator: KLM
- Registration: PH-TEN
- Flight origin: Schiphol Airport, Amsterdam
- Stopover: Prestwick Airport, Glasgow
- Destination: New York
- Occupants: 40
- Passengers: 30
- Crew: 10
- Fatalities: 40
- Survivors: 0

A KLM Lockheed L-049 Constellation airliner (named Nijmegen and registered PH-TEN) crashed into high ground near Glasgow Prestwick Airport, Scotland, on 20 October 1948; all 40 aboard died. A subsequent inquiry found that the accident was likely caused by the crew's reliance on a combination of erroneous charts and incomplete weather forecasts, causing the crew to become distracted and disoriented in the inclement conditions.

== The flight ==
=== Events prior to approach ===
The aircraft was piloted by Koene Dirk Parmentier, one of the winners of the MacRobertson Air Race, widely regarded as one of the great flyers of the era, and KLM's chief pilot. The co-pilot on the flight was Irish citizen Kevin Joseph O'Brien.

Nijmegen was scheduled to fly from its home base at Schiphol Airport near Amsterdam at 8:00 p.m. CET to New York via Prestwick, with Shannon Airport in Ireland as the alternative stopover point in case of bad weather at Prestwick. The aircraft carried sufficient fuel to divert to Shannon and then back to Schiphol, if necessary. The plane's departure was delayed as additional cargo was loaded for transport to Iceland, which would be an additional stop en route from Prestwick to New York.

The plane eventually left Schiphol at 9:11 p.m., crossed the English coast at Flamborough Head, eventually heading NW at 2320, when it turned almost due South approximately 15 miles ESE of Kilmarnock. The aircraft eventually started its run in towards runway 32 (Prestwick's longest runway and, at the time, its only runway that offered a ground-controlled approach, at 2325 at 1500'. The weather forecast Parmentier had been given by the Royal Dutch Meteorological Institute at Schiphol had told him that there was some slight cloud at Prestwick, but that it would likely dissipate by the time the Nijmegen arrived. This report was incorrect; the weather at Prestwick was steadily deteriorating, with the weather at the alternative destination of Shannon even worse.

Parmentier believed that there was a strong crosswind, blowing at right-angles to the main runway (Runway 32) at Prestwick of about 20 knots, which might prevent a landing on it. Prestwick had a second, alternative, runway (Runway 26) which was heading into the wind but had no radar-approach system. However, KLM pilot guidelines, drafted by Parmentier himself, forbade a landing at Prestwick in low cloud on the alternative runway.

By the time of approach, Prestwick was under drizzle and a cloud-base that was almost solid at 600 feet (180 m), forecast to continue from about 11:00 p.m. onwards, around the time the Nijmegen was approaching the airfield. As the flight had taken off late, they had not picked up the radio message broadcast by Prestwick airfield informing them of this. Parmentier was thus unaware of the deterioration in the weather: were he aware of it he would have been able to divert to Shannon. The routine weather reports broadcast from Prestwick had given a cloud cover of 700 feet (210 m). No new forecasts, which would have told Parmentier of the expected decreased ceiling were broadcast. Nor did he know that already that evening two airliners from SAS had turned back rather than attempt a landing at Prestwick.

Inland of the runway was high ground of over 400 feet (120 m), but the KLM-issued charts which the crew were using did not mark any land higher than 250 feet (76 m). Three miles (5 km) to the north-east of the runway, rising to over 600 feet (180 m), were a set of Wireless masts. Three miles (4.8 km) inland ran a series of electricity pylons and high-tension cables, the main national grid line for South Scotland, carrying 132,000 volts. However, the error-riddled charts issued by KLM did not have these marked and gave a spot height close by of 45'.

=== Approach and crash ===
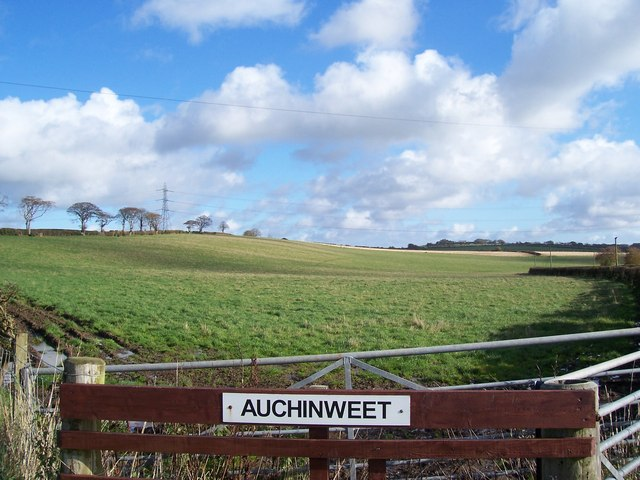
The hill where the aircraft crashed. The picture was taken in 2007

The plane made radio contact with approach control at Prestwick shortly before 11:00 p.m. At this point the cross-wind over the main runway had, unknown to Parmentier, dropped to 14 knots which made it within limits to attempt a landing on the main runway. Instead, he decided to attempt an overshoot of the main runway guided by the ground radar controller, followed by a left-hand turn that would bring the plane downwind of the alternative runway. He would then overfly the runway before looping round for his final approach. While it might sound complicated, Parmentier expected to be in visual contact with the ground which would make such an attempt relatively easy.

At 11:16 p.m. Prestwick broadcast a morse message warning of the deteriorating weather, however as the Nijmegen had now switched over to voice contact the message would not have been received. On the approach they were told of the decreased cross-wind and decided to attempt a landing on the main runway after all. However, three miles out Parmentier decided that the wind was probably too strong for landing on the main runway and decided to overshoot and land on the alternate. He overflew Runway 26, the lights of which he could now see, climbed to a height of 450 feet (140 m) and extended the landing gear ready for landing. At this point they ran into what Parmentier believed was an isolated patch of cloud. However, this was the actual cloud-base, which was now as low as 300 feet (91 m) in some areas. At this point the Nijmegen was headed directly for the power cables at 450 feet (140 m), which the crew believed to be substantially lower.

Parmentier realised the 'isolated fog' he had run into was getting denser, but due to his belief that they would have visual contact with the ground the crew had not attempted to time their flight downwind of the runway. Before he could abort the attempt, the plane crashed into the electricity cables, hitting the main phase conductor line. The crew attempted to turn the now burning aircraft towards the runway with the intent of an emergency landing. However, the faulty charts led them to crash into high ground five miles east-north-east of the airfield at about 23:32 UTC.

All 30 passengers (22 Dutch, 6 German, 1 British and 1 Irish) and the 10 crew died. Rescue services did not reach the crash-site for over one and a half hours due to confusion over which service was responsible for responding to the crash. By the time they arrived only six people were still alive, and all died within 24 hours. Diamonds valued at £15,000 and a miscellaneous collection of watches valued at £16,000 were found at the crash site.

== Court of enquiry ==
The subsequent court of enquiry blamed several factors for the crash:

- The failure of the ground authorities to inform the Nijmegen of the deterioration in the weather.
- The failure of the crew to time their flight downwind of the runway.
- The errors in the official KLM approach chart the crew had relied on. It emerged during the enquiry that these charts had been copied from war-era United States Air Force charts, which upon subsequent examination were also found to be faulty. The court of enquiry was astonished to find that KLM had relied on maps from a foreign authority when detailed and correct maps were available from the Ordnance Survey, the United Kingdom's national mapping authority.

The enquiry determined the probable cause for the accident was:

1. That when the pilot started his landing manoeuvre for runway 26 of Prestwick Airport the weather conditions were already below the limits for this manoeuvre but that from the weather forecasts received this could not be known to him and that this could not be personally judged at the time.
2. That, although the landing on runway 26 under the weather conditions, as far as these were known to the pilot, required the greatest caution, the pilot could not be blamed for having commenced that landing procedure.
3. That flying too long on the downwind-leg of runway 26 caused the accident.
4. That, if no unknown circumstances contributed to the extension of the flight on the downwind-leg of runway 26, the extension was due to the delayed action of the pilot after he lost visual approach.
5. That it was not impossible that a stronger wind that the pilot accounted for contributed to the extension of the flight on the downwind-leg of runway 26.
6. That the possibility of other circumstances as mentioned under 4 could not be ruled out, but that no data was available which could give cause for the supposition that they contributed to the extension of the flight at a low altitude on the downwind-leg of runway 26."Accident description". Aviation Safety Network.

== Notable fatalities ==
- Bert Sas, Dutch diplomat, former military attaché to Berlin who warned the Allies in October 1939 about German plans to invade France and the Low Countries.
