= 1936 KLM Croydon accident =

1936 aviation accident

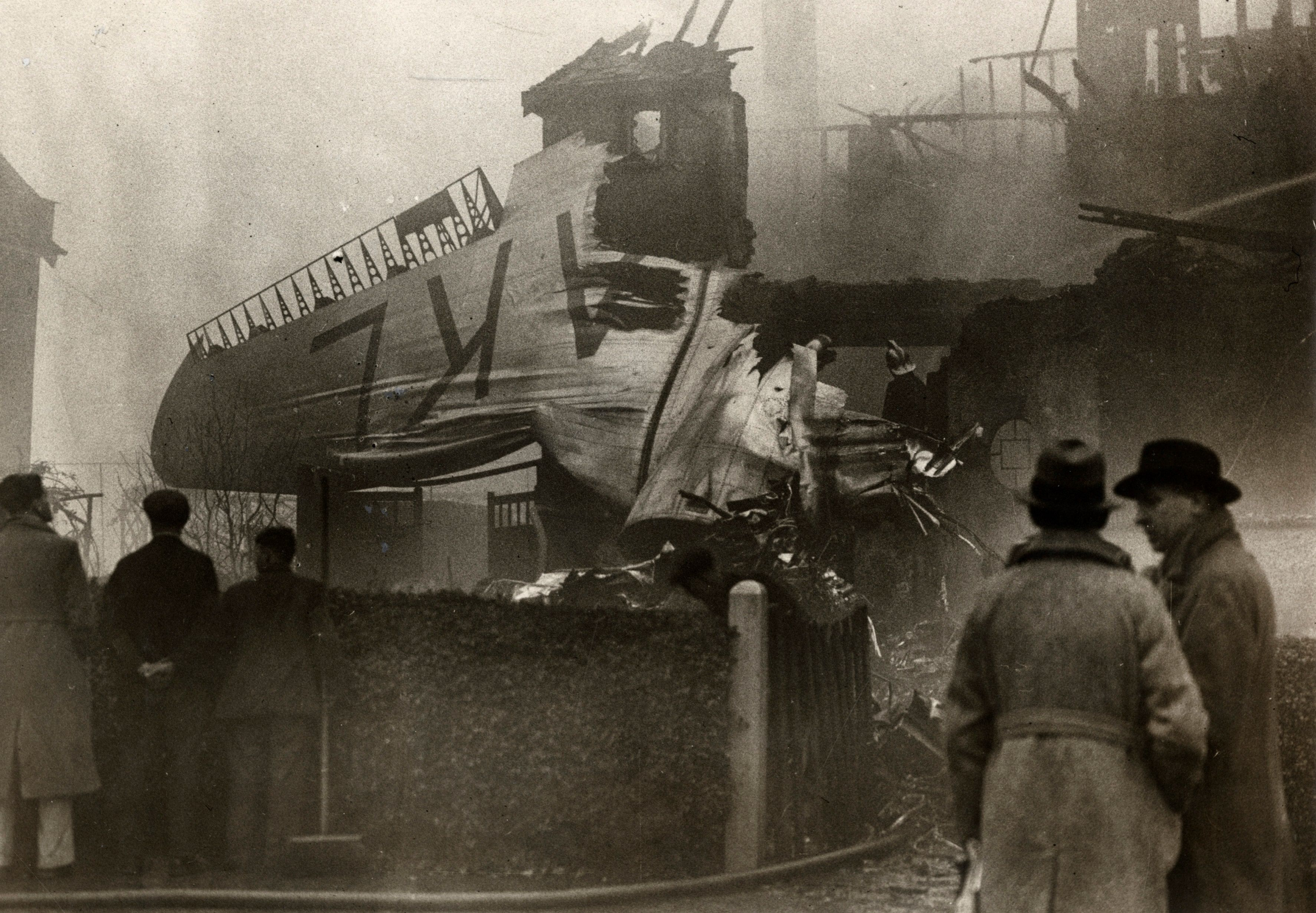
- Disaster site, with part of a wing visible

Accident
- Date: 9 December 1936
- Summary: Crash on take-off
- Site: Croydon, United Kingdom; 51°20′45″N 0°7′21″W

Aircraft
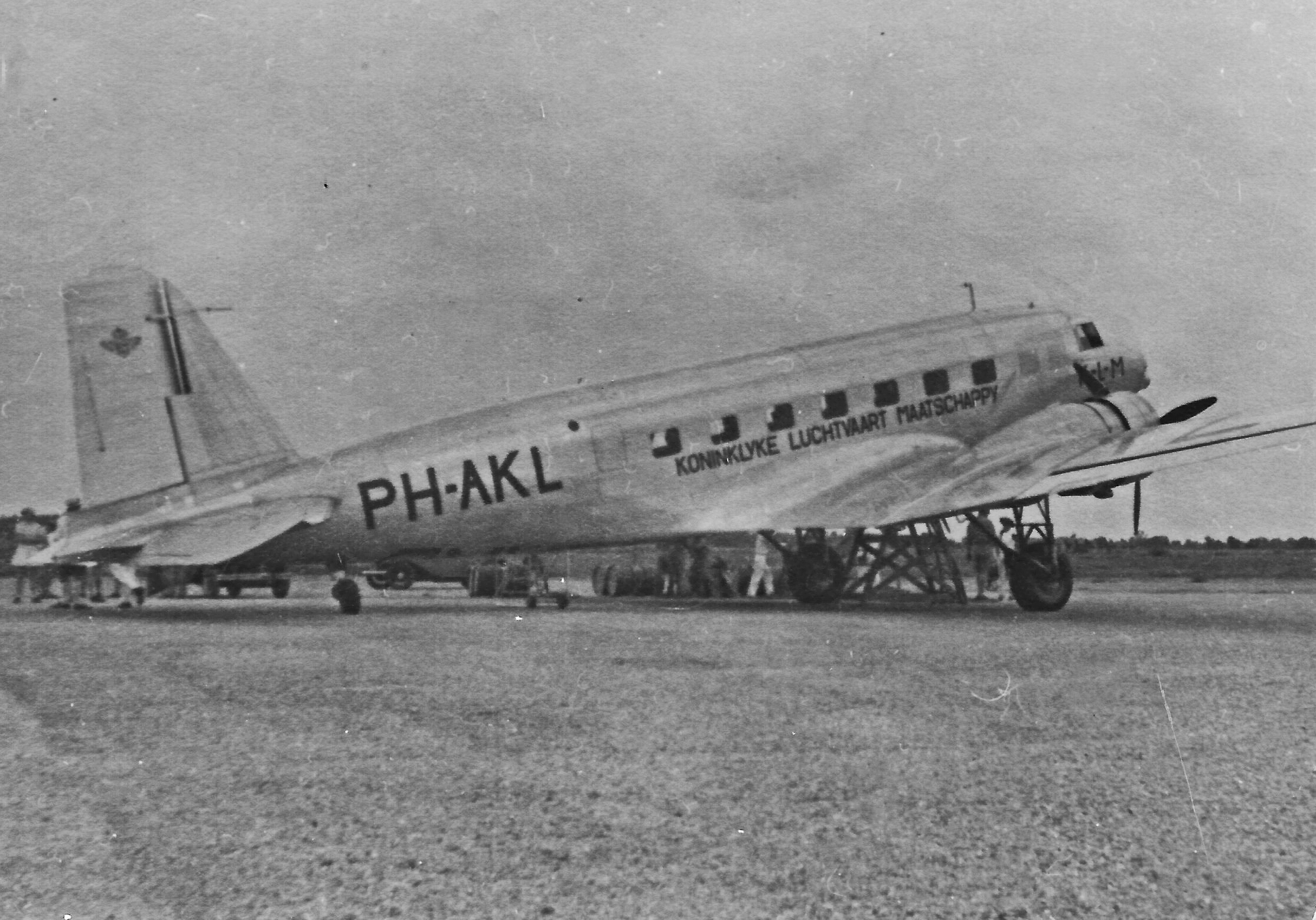
- PH-AKL, the aircraft involved, pictured at Alor Setar, Malaysia
- Aircraft type: Douglas DC-2-115E
- Aircraft name: Lijster
- Operator: KLM Royal Dutch Airlines
- Registration: PH-AKL
- Flight origin: Croydon Air Port, Croydon, United Kingdom
- Destination: Amsterdam-Schiphol Municipal Airport (AMS/EHAM), Amsterdam, Netherlands
- Passengers: 13
- Crew: 4
- Fatalities: 15
- Injuries: 2
- Survivors: 2

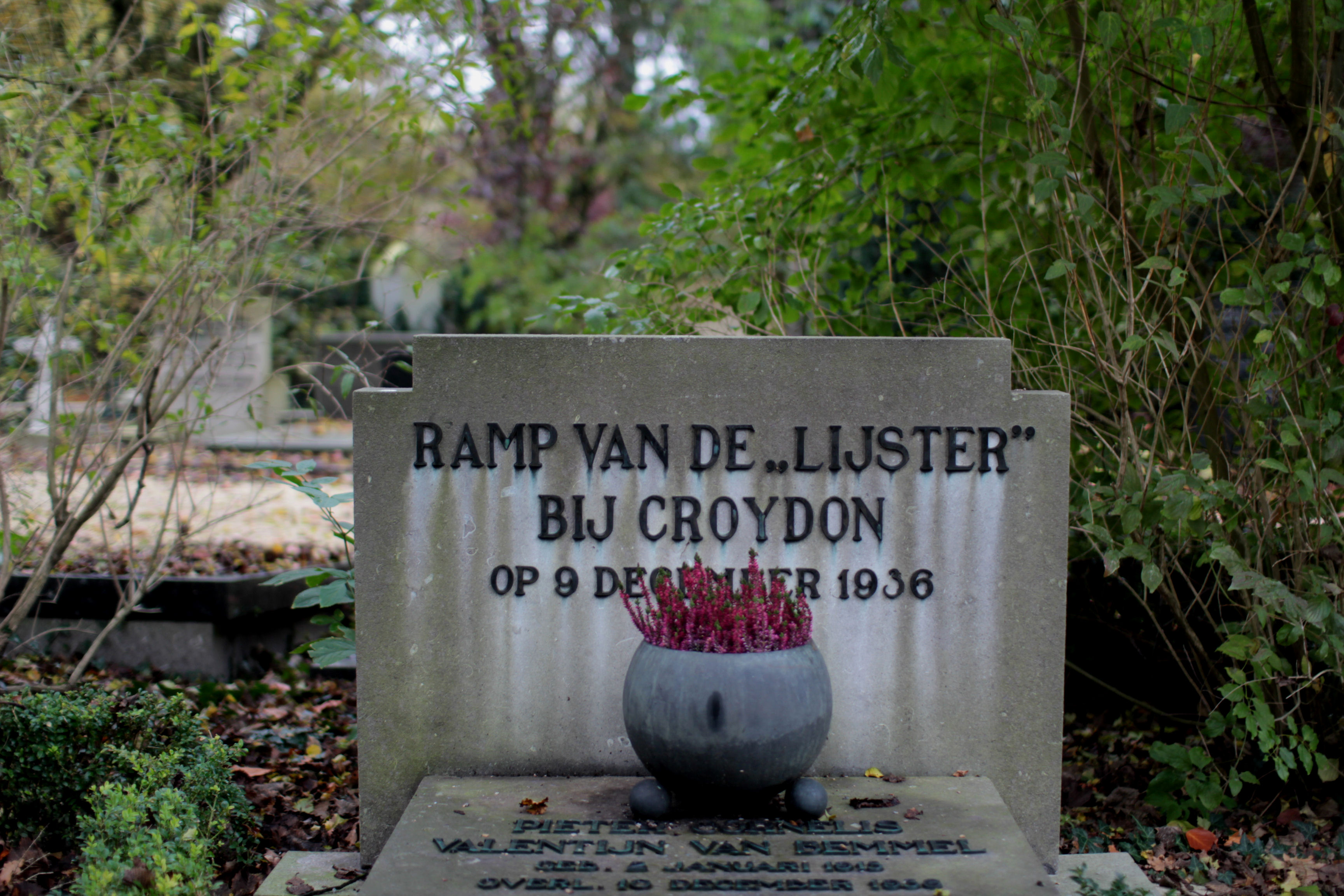
A grave monument at the Amsterdam cemetery Zorgvlied

The 1936 KLM Croydon accident was the crash of a KLM airliner on 9 December 1936, shortly after taking off from the Croydon Air Port (as it was known at the time) on a scheduled flight to Amsterdam, Netherlands. The aircraft was destroyed and 15 of the 17 passengers and crew on board died as a result of the accident. Three of the passengers who died were Arvid Lindman, a former Prime Minister of Sweden, Magnus Wegelius, a Finnish athlete, and Juan de la Cierva, the Spanish inventor of the autogyro.

== Aircraft ==
The Douglas DC-2 involved in the accident had been delivered to KLM and registered as PH-AKL the previous April.

== Accident ==
On the day of the accident Croydon Air Port was shrouded in fog with visibility fluctuating at around 50 m (55 yd); and all aircraft were operating under so-called "QBI" (a Q code denoting that all operations have to be performed under instrument flight rules) conditions. Crews of aircraft were following a white line laid out approximately east–west on the grass surface of Croydon's landing area during their take-off runs (a normal procedure at several airports in the United Kingdom at the time, that had been in use at Croydon since 1931). A number of departures by this method had already been made that day by the time the KLM DC-2 took off, including a Swissair DC-2 about 25 minutes beforehand.

The KLM DC-2 started its takeoff along the white line but after about 200 yd (183 m) veered off the line to the left and on becoming airborne headed south towards rising ground instead of in the normal westerly direction. After flying over the southern boundary of the airport, the aircraft hit the chimney of a house on Hillcrest Road, Purley, then crashed into an empty house on the opposite side of the street. The aircraft, the house and an adjoining house (also empty at the time) were destroyed in the crash and ensuing fire. 14 of the passengers and crew were killed in the crash; the one surviving passenger found at the accident site later died at Purley Hospital, while the flight attendant and radio operator survived.

At the time this was the worst aircraft crash in the United Kingdom in terms of the number of fatalities. This was the second crash of an aircraft using the white line to take off at Croydon in fog. On 31 May 1934 an Air France aircraft carrying newspapers to Paris crashed after hitting the mast of an aircraft radio navigation beacon that had been erected off the end of the white-line takeoff path, killing the two crew.

== Investigation ==
The official investigation into the accident was terminated on 16 December without reaching a verdict.

== See also ==
- Ludwig Hautzmayer, a WWI flying ace, died in the same accident. http://www.rcawsey.co.uk/Acc1937.htm
