= Herman de Man =

Dutch novelist

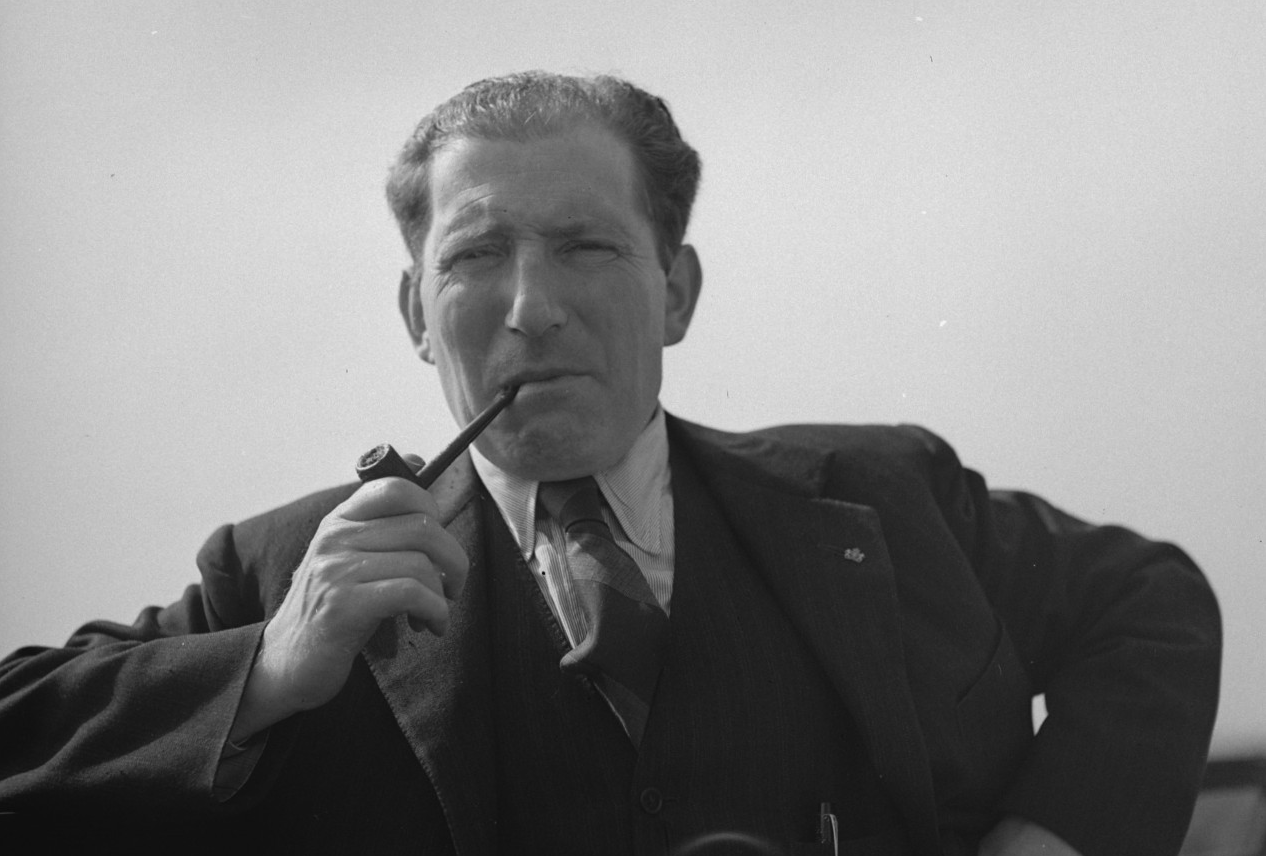
Herman de Man in London (1943)

Salomon Herman "Sal" Hamburger (11 July 1898 – 14 November 1946), known under his pseudonym Herman de Man, was a Dutch novelist.

== Life and work ==
Salomon Herman Hamburger was born on 11 July 1898 in Woerden in the Netherlands.

De Man, son of businessman Herman Salomon Hamburger and Sarah Cohen Schavrien, grew up in the Lopikerwaard area. His family has lived in Woerden, Benschop, Oudewater and Gouda. Many of his later novels are set in the places where he grew up. His novel The rising waters, which appeared in 1991, the 30th print, is located in the Lopikerwaard. The book received wide publicity, partly because it was made into a 1986 eight-part television series: six million viewers viewed this series that year. It was then repeated several times, most recently in 2011. De Man died in an airplane crash on 14 November 1946 during a third unsuccessful landing attempt of a Douglas C-47 of KLM. The aircraft was following a course correction and crashed to the ground. All 21 passengers and 5 crew were killed.

== Works ==
- De barre winter van negentig ISBN 90-75323-39-5
- Rijshout en rozen ISBN 90-205-2144-6
- Het wassende water ISBN 90-205-2165-9
- Van winter tot winter ISBN 90-73455-01-4
- Aardebanden
- Zonen van de Paardekop ISBN 90-214-7422-0
- Geiten ISBN 90-214-7421-2
- Heilig Pietje de Booy ISBN 90-214-1285-3
- Kapitein Aart Luteyn & Aart Luteyn de andere ISBN 90-214-1286-1
- De koets ISBN 90-214-1284-5
- Stoombootje in de mist & Scheepswerf de Kroonprinces ISBN 90-214-1283-7
