= 1931 Bangkok KLM Fokker F.VIIb-3m crash =

1931 aviation accident

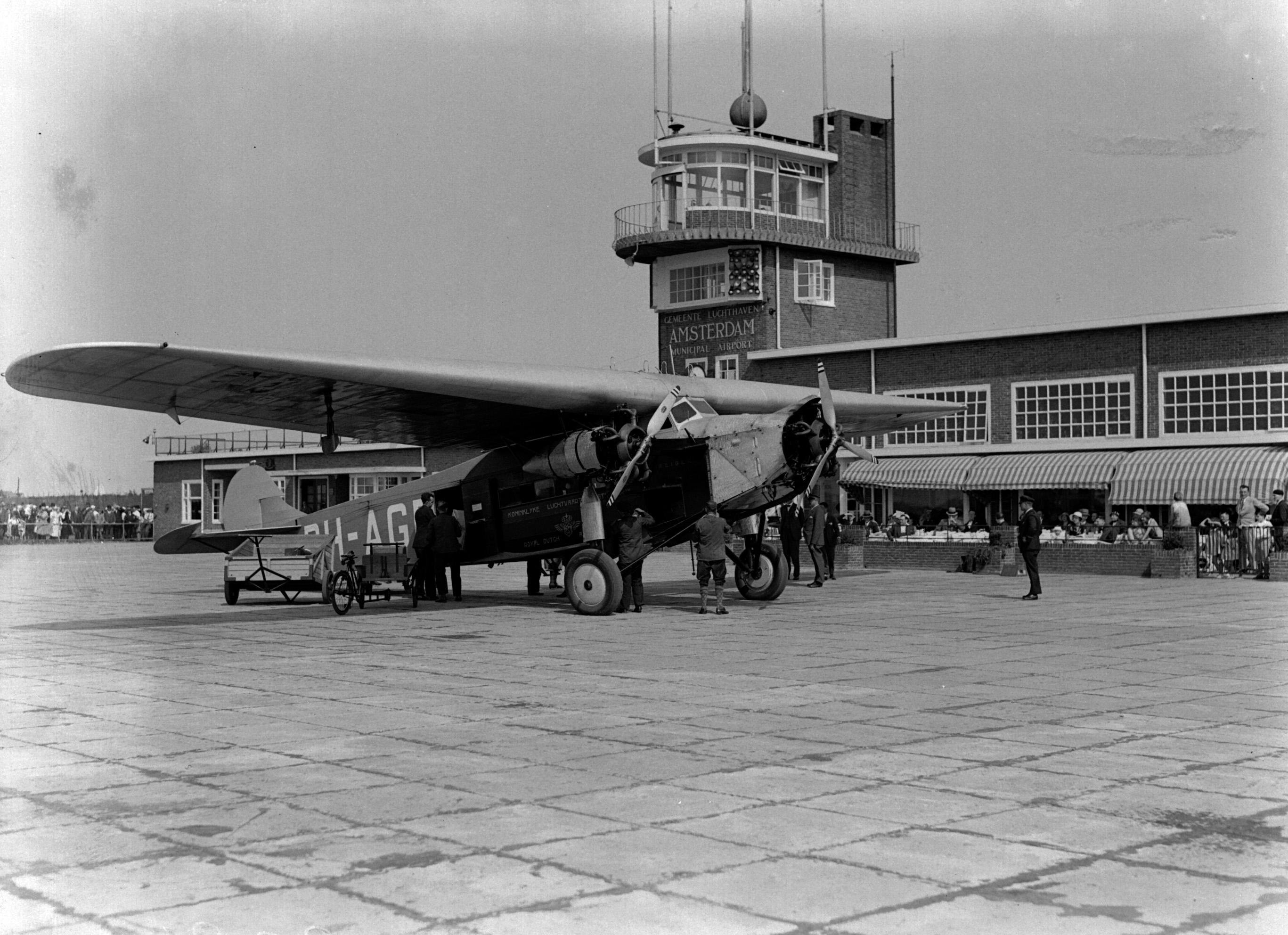
- Similar Fokker F.VIIb/3m of the KLM as involved in the accident.

Accident
- Date: 6 December 1931
- Summary: Failure to take off
- Site: Don Muang Airfield, Bangkok, Siam (now Thailand)

Aircraft
- Aircraft type: Fokker F.VIIb/3m
- Operator: KLM
- Registration: PH-AFO
- Flight origin: Bandoeng, Dutch East Indies
- Stopover: Alor Star, British Malaya
- 2nd stopover: Bangkok, Siam
- 3rd stopover: Rangoon, Burma
- Destination: Amsterdam, Netherlands
- Occupants: 7
- Passengers: 3
- Crew: 4
- Fatalities: 5
- Injuries: 1
- Survivors: 1

The 1931 Bangkok KLM Fokker F.VIIb-3m crash occurred on 6 December 1931 when a KLM Fokker F.VIIb/3m aircraft, registration PH-AFO and named Ooievaar ("Stork"), crashed during takeoff from Bangkok. Of the seven people on board, five were killed and one was seriously injured; the radio operator was the sole survivor.

The accident received enormous media attention, had multiple investigations and had repercussions for KLM that lasted for more than six years.

== Background ==
KLM introduced in October 1931 a regular scheduled service between Amsterdam and Batavia (14,350 km), lasting ten to twelve days, using the Fokker F.XII. This historic mail and passenger route; one of the longest in the world, ran via numerous intermediate stops, including Athens, Baghdad, and Bangkok, and became a vital air link with the Dutch East Indies.

== Crew and passengers ==
=== Crew ===
The crew consisted of Captain Thaeke Wiersma, co-pilot Jan van Onlangs, radio operator G. van Zadelhoff, and flight engineer J.F.W.O. Kotte.

Wiersma, aged 32, was an experienced pilot from Sneek who had been flying since 1922 and had joined KLM in 1928; this was his second flight to the Dutch East Indies as captain. Van Onlangs, aged 29, had joined KLM in 1929 after serving as a military pilot and had already completed several flights to the East Indies. Kotte, a KLM technician of six years, was on his fifth such journey. Van Zadelhoff, engaged at the time, worked as a radio operator for Radio Holland.

=== Passengers ===
The passengers were A. Borg (Dutch), Colonel Brinsmead (British), and C. Baudart (French).

== Flight and crash ==
On 4 December 1931, the KLM-operated Fokker aircraft Fokker F.VIIb/3m "PH-AFO" named Ooievaar ("Stork" in Dutch), departed from Bandoeng on its 51st return flight from the Dutch East Indies to the Netherlands. There were four crew members and three passengers on board. Bangkok was one of the scheduled stopovers on this route. The aircraft arrived at Don Muang airfield from Alor Star at approximately 14:00 on 5 December without incident. The aircraft was loaded to approximately 5,059 kg, below the maximum allowable weight of 5,250 kg. The crew members and passengers spent the evening at the airfield before departure the following morning to Rangoon.

At around 05:45 on 6 December, the aircraft began its takeoff roll. A Siamese start official observed that the emergency hatch above the cockpit was open and attempted to signal this to the crew. However, no corrective action was taken, possibly because the signal was misunderstood. The aircraft continued its takeoff run but failed to lift off after an unusually long distance. Near the end of the airfield, the aircraft struck an earthen embankment and a ditch, causing the landing gear to break off. The aircraft then slid forward, dug its nose into a second embankment, and overturned into a flooded rice field. During the crash sequence, two engines were shut down, and the aircraft ultimately came to rest inverted after being completely destroyed.

Second pilot J. van Onlangs and two passengers were killed instantly. Captain Th. Wiersma and passenger Colonel Brinsmead were seriously injured. Wiersma died a few hours later and Brinsmead later died of his injuries in Australia. Radio operator G. van Zadelhoff sustained only minor injuries.

== Aftermath ==
=== Funerals ===
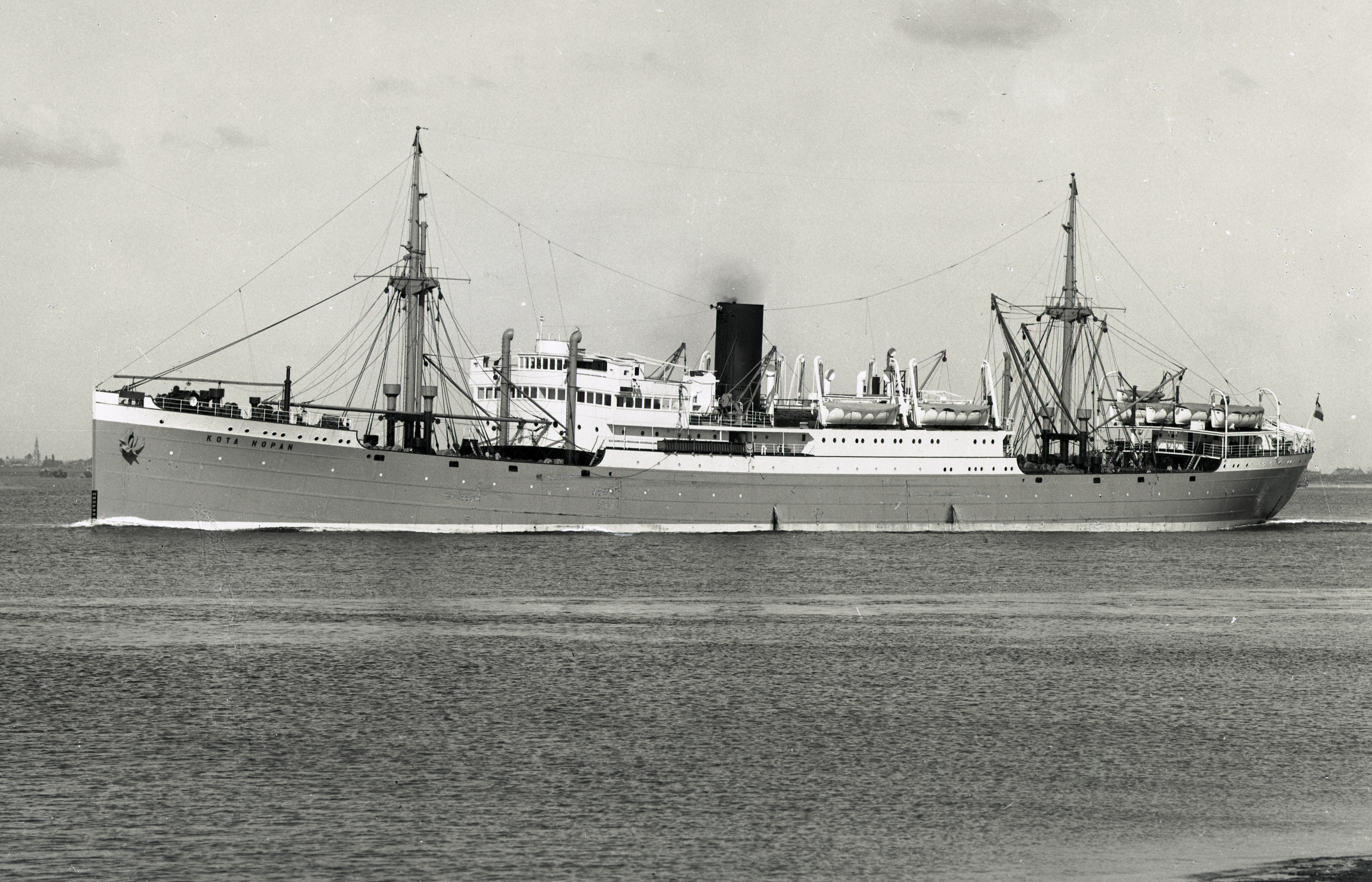
The killed crew members were transported to the Netherlands with cargo ship Kota Nopan

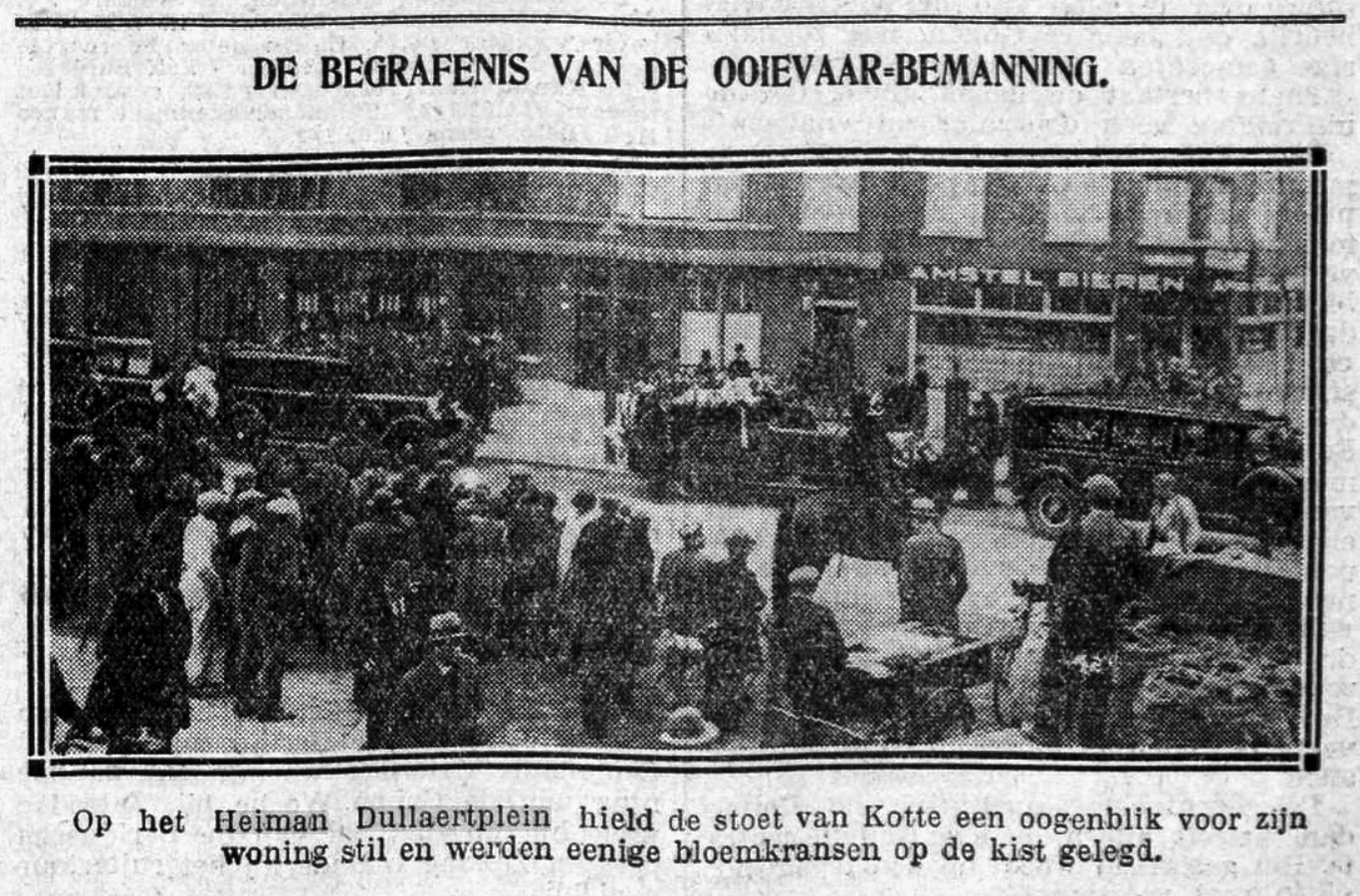
Newspaper image of the funeral procession

After wreaths had been laid on the coffins at a ceremony in Batavia, the coffins of the killed crew members (captain T. Wiersma, second pilot Jan van Onlangs and mechanic J.F.W.W. Kotte) draped in the Dutch tricolor, were transported from Bangkok to the Netherlands with cargo ship Kota Nopan that sailed with a sign of mourning. In Rotterdam, a chapel of rest was set up at the IJsselhaven, where family, KLM representatives, and officials paid their respects. Commander T. Wiersma was laid to rest at Zorgvlied Cemetery in Amsterdam, while the second pilot Jan van Onlangs and mechanic J.F.O.W. Kotte were buried at Crooswijk Cemetery in Rotterdam.

The funerals were marked by solemn ceremonies, speeches honoring the crew's professionalism and dedication, and large public attendance, including a speech of KLM director Albert Plesman. Flags were flown at half-mast, wreaths were laid, and the proceedings included organ music and traditional tributes. Family members, colleagues, and aviation officials expressed deep sympathy and paid final respects, highlighting the national mourning for the crew who perished far from home.

In June 1932 a memorial was unveiled for pilot Jan van Onlangs at the general cemetery in Crooswijk, in attendance of among others KLM representatives.

=== Procedure changes ===
The crash resulted, already before the result of the investigation report, in introduction of medical checks for pilots before return flights from the Dutch East Indies.

=== Disputed practices of KLM ===
==== KLM media influencing ====
In multiple occasions the KLM deputed indicated that they disagreed with the reporting about the disaster. For instance in January 1932 the KLM wrote to De Sumatra Post that there had been enough coverage on the disaster. In response the newspaper expressed strong condemnation of the fact that the KLM had written them stop writing about the crash. In July 1932, during a KLM-organized press meeting at Schiphol, KLM director Albert Plesman harassed the journalist of De Tribune and called him names because Plasman disagreed with the reporting of the accident in their newspaper.

==== KLM pilots' dissatisfaction ====
With this crash cited as one of the reasons regarding to unsafe working conditions, the majority of KLM pilots resigned because they disagreed with the company's management practices, in May 1933, 1.5 year after the crash.

In the aftermath about the crash newspaper De Tribune accused the KLM of malpractices; but all allegations were denied. For example, on 28 December 1931 the newspaper hinted that "KLM management is gambling with the lives of its aviation workers and is fully responsible for the deaths of Wiersma and the others"; on 4 January "the government is the biggest stakeholder in the system currently prevailing at KLM, which drives pilots to their deaths" and on 15 January 1932 De Tribune considered it proven that "the KLM increases its pursuit of profit and speed at the expense of the safety of its personnel".

=== Victims' compensation and lawsuit ===
In January 1932 KLM compensated the victims' families by covering funeral costs, paying outstanding salaries and providing lump sums (ƒ29,000 to the pilot's family and ƒ5,000 to the mechanic's family), alongside returning savings. Additional annual pensions were granted under Dutch law, and the government considered the overall compensation arrangements adequate.

In May 1932, the KLM was held liable for the accident by the relatives of French engineer C. A. A. Baudart who was killed, and demanded compensation. In January 1935, 3.5 years after the crash, the lawsuit started in court. Both the district court and the Dutch Court of Appeal (a year later in early 1936) declared the claimants inadmissible in their claim. Relatives ultimately went to the Supreme Court of the Netherlands in 1938 where the appeal in cassation was rejected.

=== Investigations ===
Van Zadelhoff, the sole survivor of the Ooievaar crash described how the landing gear failed and the plane flipped, leaving him trapped but ultimately able to free himself and survive in a flooded rice field. He witnessed only a few of the other crew alive, Wiersma and Colonel Brinsmead, and noted the difficult rescue due to mud, cold water, and delayed transport to Bangkok. Investigations by KLM engineer Behage confirmed that the motors were functioning properly, the aircraft was not overloaded, and the emergency hatch may have been open at some point.

==== Siamese investigation report ====
The Siamese commission of inquiry conducted a detailed technical investigation into the Ooievaar crash, examining aircraft documents, inspecting the wreckage, and interviewing 17 witnesses. Due to the deaths of both pilots and the limited testimony of the sole surviving crew member, the commission relied primarily on physical evidence and eyewitness accounts.

The report emphasized that no single cause led to the accident; rather, a combination of aerodynamic and operational factors prevented the aircraft from becoming airborne.

The open emergency hatch above the cockpit was considered a key issue. According to the commission, this would have increased air resistance (drag) and disturbed airflow over the aircraft, reducing its ability to gain sufficient speed and lift. It may also have affected the aircraft's balance, contributing to instability during the takeoff run. The improper trim, caused by an unfavorable load distribution, further complicated the situation. Although the total weight was within limits, the placement of passengers and reduced fuel load altered the aircraft's center of gravity, making it tail-heavy. Because the stabilizer was set in a neutral position rather than adjusted for this condition, the aircraft was not optimally balanced for takeoff, reducing its lift performance. Finally, the aircraft attempted to take off with a slight tailwind. Even though the wind was weak, a tailwind increases the ground speed required to achieve the necessary airspeed for lift-off, thereby lengthening the takeoff run. In combination with the other factors, this reduced the margin for a successful takeoff.

The Siamese commission also attributed a significant part of the accident to the actions and judgment of the pilot. Although the aircraft failed to take off properly, the pilot did not abort the takeoff despite having sufficient runway remaining. According to the report, the aircraft required only about 400 metres to become airborne under normal conditions, while approximately 1,600 metres were available. The continued takeoff attempt under abnormal circumstances was therefore considered a critical error in judgment. The commission suggested that the pilot may have been influenced by earlier experience during departure from Alor Star, where poor field conditions had caused a difficult takeoff. This may have led him to believe that the situation was still recoverable, causing him to continue the takeoff roll longer than advisable. Even after the aircraft briefly lifted and then settled back, the pilot persisted in attempting to get airborne instead of stopping.

Additionally, the report noted safety concerns such as inadequate seat construction and lack of passenger restraint use, suggesting these may have worsened the consequences of the crash.

===== Response =====
The report was heavily criticized by pilots who strongly reject the report's conclusions, criticizing the commission's lack of practical aviation experience. They dismiss claims that the aircraft started against the wind, was improperly loaded, or had a hatch open as "bloody nonsense", asserting that these factors could not have caused the accident. While the exact cause remains uncertain, the pilots unanimously agree that Captain Wiersma should be fully rehabilitated. The KLM officially refrained from commenting; partly for diplomatic reasons.

==== Testing flights ====
Following the published report of the Siamese government, further investigation into the cause of the accident was conducted in January, February and March 1932.

In January 1932 a test flight was conducted with an opened emergency hatch. The pilots were not able to lift off.

The maximum weight of 5,250 kg for this type of aircraft (Fokker Fokker F.VIIb/3m), as determined by the Netherlands' National Aviation Research Service, would not be permissible in the tropics. This is due to the lower air density and higher temperatures, which negatively affect lift and make the effective weight appear greater.

In February 1932 at Schiphol and on multiple occasions in March in Batavia test flights with an identical aircraft were held for testing the effect of overloading.

==== Dutch government investigation ====
After the Siamese investigation report, the Dutch government also launched its own investigation into the crash. The government committee published its report in March 1932. The report did not reveal any new findings or perspectives beyond what was already known. Overall, the commission found no structural or organizational fault with KLM, placing the cause mainly on human factors related to the pilot's judgment.

They concluded that the aircraft itself was technically sound. There were no issues with its airworthiness, engines, weight, loading, or weather conditions, and the pilot, T. Wiersma, was considered competent.

The most likely cause of the accident was that the aircraft attempted takeoff while a hatch (emergency exit) was open, which had not been properly secured before departure. Despite abnormal behavior during the takeoff run, the crew did not abort the attempt while there was still sufficient runway available. The investigation attributed these errors primarily to an abnormal psychological state of the pilot at the time. There was no evidence that fatigue, workload, or crew behavior prior to departure contributed to this condition.

After the crash, the KLM introduced medical checks for pilots before return flights from the Dutch East Indies. The commission reviewed this measure and concluded that additional interim medical examinations could slightly improve safety, but their benefits were limited and did not outweigh the burden on pilots, who were already subject to frequent and demanding medical requirements. Instead, the commission considered it more effective to require pilots and airlines to promptly report illnesses, psychological issues (such as depression), or medical treatments to aviation medical authorities, so that further evaluation or temporary grounding could be considered.

An expert noted that even a medical examination might not have detected the pilot Wiersma's severe depression in this case. The commission also pointed out that the KLM's pay structure, where bonuses for flying formed a large part of income, may have encouraged pilots to continue flying despite poor health, though it did not make formal recommendations on this issue.

=== Impact on KLM ===
While the KLM had a successful service year, the crash cast a shadow over KLM's positive achieved results.
