= KLM Flight 592 =

1952 aviation accident

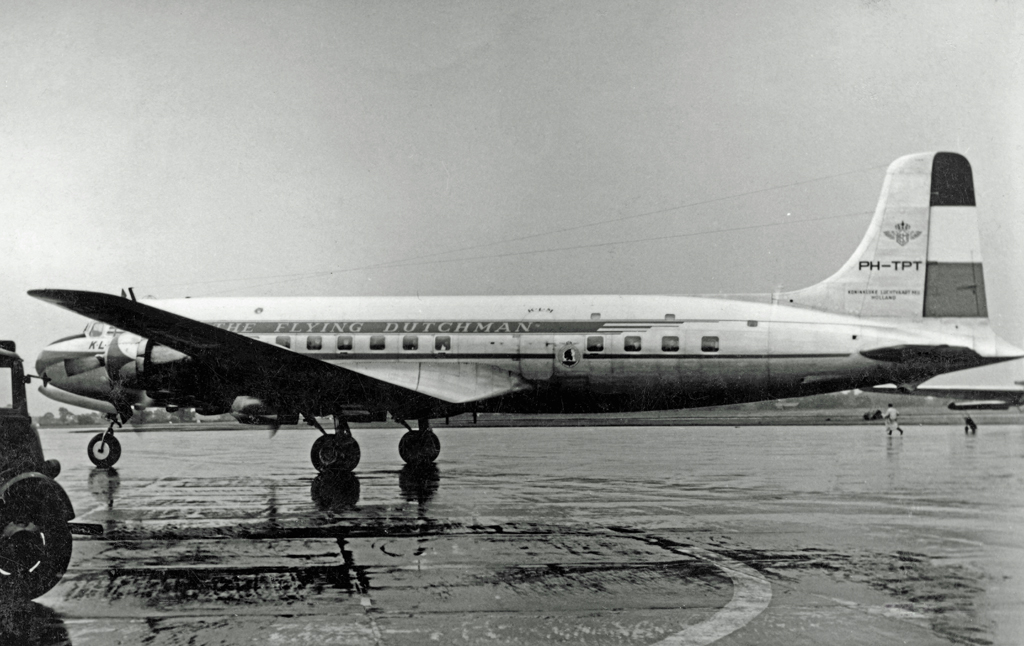
- A KLM DC-6 similar to the crash aircraft

Crash
- Date: March 22, 1952
- Summary: Undetermined
- Site: Approximately 7 km north east of Frankfurt International; 50.07247°N 8.67753°E

Aircraft
- Aircraft type: Douglas DC-6
- Aircraft name: Koningin Juliana
- Operator: KLM Royal Dutch Airlines
- Registration: PH-TPJ
- Flight origin: Rome-Ciampino Airport
- Destination: Frankfurt International
- Passengers: 37
- Crew: 10
- Fatalities: 45 (initially 39)
- Injuries: 2
- Survivors: 2 (initially 6)

KLM Flight 592, a KLM Douglas DC-6 was a scheduled passenger flight from Rome-Ciampino Airport (CIA/LIRA) to Frankfurt International Airport (FRA/EDDF). On Saturday 22 March 1952, Flight 592 crashed on final approaching to Frankfurt International around 10:45 AM Local time; 45 of the 47 people aboard the DC-6 were killed.

== Aircraft ==
On 22 March 1952, KLM Flight 592 was operated using a Douglas DC-6 (registration nr. PH-TPJ). The aircraft first flew in 1948. This was the 12th loss of a DC-6, the 8th fatal accident and the 4th worst accident with the type (at the time, now 20th's worst). After the crash, the aircraft was damaged beyond repair.

== Crash ==
Flight 592 departed Rome-Ciampino Airport and headed for Frankfurt Airport, around 10:38 AM local time the crew of Flight 592 contact Frankfurt Air Traffic Control and reported they were overhead the staden beacon at 4,000 feet (1,200 m). 7 minutes later, at around 10:45, the crew reported that they were approaching the Offenbach beacon and descending to 2,460 feet (750 m). Nothing more was heard from the flight after this. Around five minutes later, the aircraft crashed into a forest. Of the 47 people aboard, 45 did not survive the crash. The survivors were one crew member and one passenger. Six people were initially pulled alive from the wreckage by passing lorry driver, Willi Hoffman, who used a pocket knife to cut the immediate survivors free of the wreckage before they were consumed by the flames. Three of the six rescued died on the way to hospital while another died later.

== Investigation ==
The cause of the crash was not determined, but it was possible that the crew continued the approach below the minimum descent altitude to maintain a visual contact with the ground.
