= 1946 Amsterdam KLM Douglas C-47 crash =

Aviation accident in the Netherlands

1946 KLM Douglas C-47 Amsterdam accident
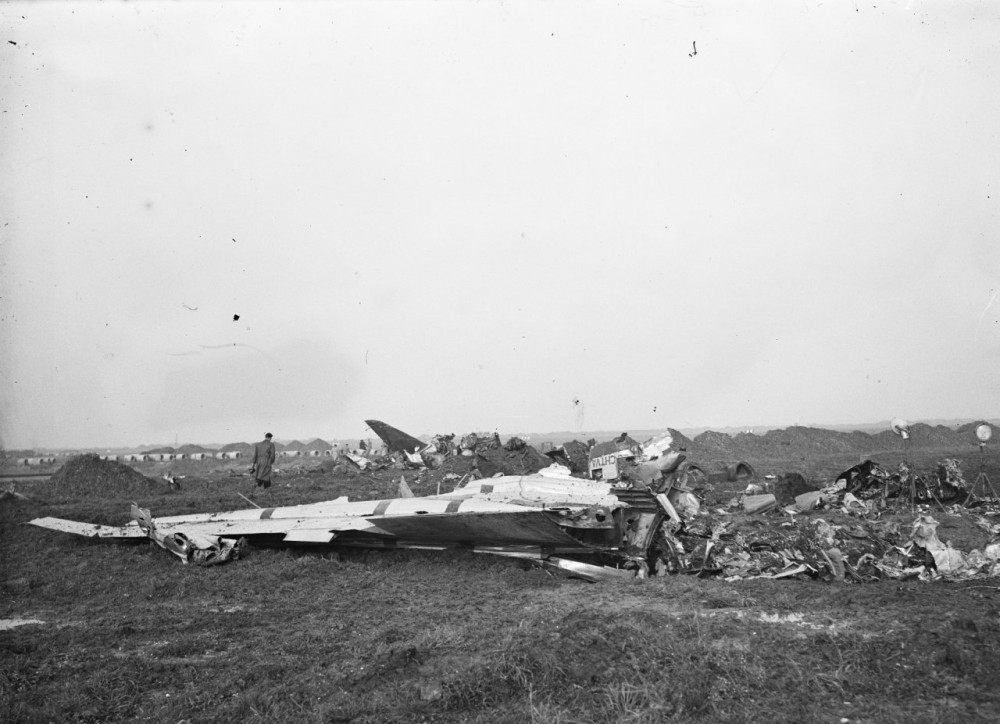
- Wreckage of PH-TBW

Accident
- Date: 14 November 1946
- Summary: Controlled flight into terrain in poor weather
- Site: Amsterdam Schiphol Airport, Netherlands

Aircraft
- Aircraft type: Douglas C-47A Skytrain
- Operator: KLM
- Registration: PH-TBW
- Flight origin: London, United Kingdom
- Destination: Amsterdam Schiphol Airport, Netherlands
- Occupants: 26
- Passengers: 21
- Crew: 5
- Fatalities: 26
- Survivors: 0

The 1946 KLM Douglas C-47 Amsterdam accident was the crash of a KLM Royal Dutch Airlines flight from London to Amsterdam on 14 November 1946. The accident occurred as the aircraft was attempting to land at Amsterdam's airport in poor weather. All 26 passengers and crew on board were killed.

== Accident ==
The civil-use converted C-47 Skytrain was on a scheduled flight from London, England to Amsterdam in the Netherlands. At 7:50 pm on the evening of 14 November 1946, the aircraft had been cleared to land at Schiphol Airport in poor weather. The first attempt to land failed and the crew had to perform a go-around. The second approach to land also failed. On the third approach to land, the aircraft made a sudden turn to the left, apparently trying to line up with the runway. During this turn the aircraft struck the ground and crashed. Witnesses in the tower stated that the aircraft engines appeared to have stalled when the aircraft was at 300 feet (91 m) above the ground. The flight crew were able to restart the engines, but the plane was too low to recover.

The aircraft caught fire and broke apart on impact, killing all 21 passengers and five crew on board. Rescuers on the scene arrived but were unable to approach the wreckage due to the flames. The fire lasted seven minutes, and by the time the Amsterdam Fire Service arrived, the fire was already out, with no survivors. A KLM official stated that the cause of the crash was a too-slow approach speed during the landing, which led to a stall. The official stated that the pilot attempted to increase his speed just before landing.

At the time it happened, the accident was the worst aviation accident in the history of the Netherlands. Eight days earlier another KLM DC-3 operating on the same route in the opposite direction, crashed on approach to London's Croydon Airport in poor weather. There were no fatalities in the London crash but the aircraft was written off.

== Passengers and crew ==
The aircraft was carrying twenty-one passengers and five crew members at the time of the crash. Five of the passengers and the captain of the flight were British citizens, and the remaining were Dutch citizens. Many of the Dutch passengers were army officers on a service flight between London and the Netherlands. The victims included Dutch novelist Herman de Man. The captain, James Moreton, was a British citizen who had been employed by KLM and had seventeen years of flying experience.
