= Koene Dirk Parmentier =

Dutch aviator (1904–1948)

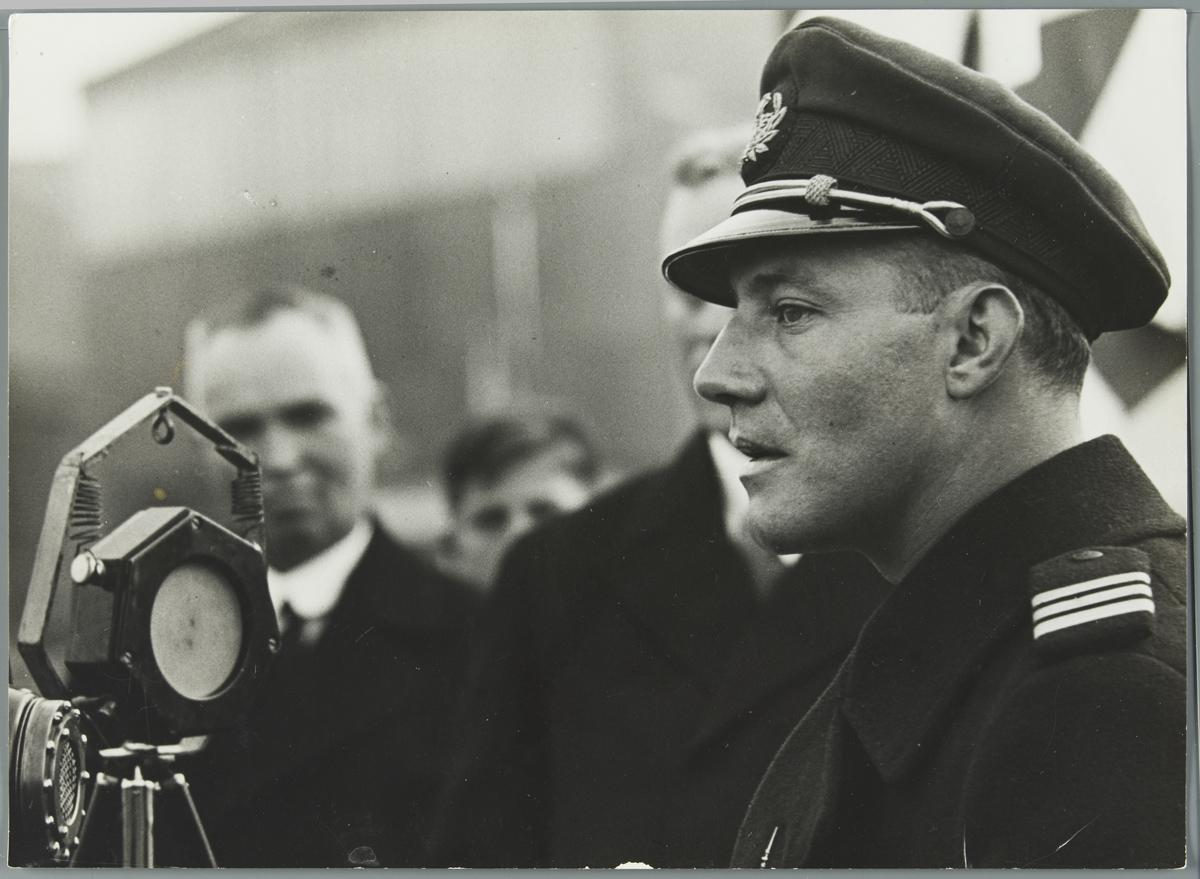
- Koene Dirk Parmentier in 1934
- Born: Amsterdam
- Died: Prestwick, Scotland

Koene Dirk Parmentier (27 September 1904 – 21 October 1948) was a pilot of the Dutch national airline KLM.

Parmentier worked at Dutch aircraft manufacturer Fokker from 1920 to 1924. During his military service, he obtained his pilot's license in 1927, after which he joined KLM in 1929.

In 1934 Parmentier flew KLM's Douglas DC-2 with registration number PH-AJU Uiver ("Stork") in the MacRobertson Air Race from England to Australia. The Uiver was KLM's first aircraft to consist entirely of metal. With the only big passenger aircraft to compete in the nearly 20,000-kilometer air race, Parmentier achieved an honorable second place with his crew.

After the outbreak of World War II, Parmentier moved to England with the DC-3 Egret (PH-ARZ) on May 13, 1940. There he led the KLM crews who had fled to England with a number of DC-3s and one DC-2 and were deployed by BOAC on the Bristol-Lisbon scheduled service.

On April 19, 1943, the DC-3 Ibis (PH-ALI), piloted by Captain Parmentier, was shot at by six Luftwaffe fighters while en route from England to Lisbon. Parmentier and his crew escaped and managed to land the damaged plane in Lisbon with no harm to the passengers.

For his merits during the war, Parmentier was awarded several military awards, including his appointment on 18 March 1943 as Officer of the Order of the British Empire (OBE) for his deployment and leadership of the KLM section within BOAC under very difficult circumstances and the Kite Cross (24 June 1943) for his performance during the attack on 19 April 1943.

After the war, he first became chief flight service at KLM and a short time later head of flight company.

The 1948 KLM Constellation air disaster occurred the night of 20 to 21 October 1948, when Parmentier crashed with the Lockheed Constellation Nijmegen (PH-TEN) at Prestwick airport in Scotland, when the aircraft hit a high-voltage cable during bad weather and then crashed.

Parmentier is buried in the Rhijnhof cemetery in Leiden.

== Bibliography ==
- Parmentier, K.D. (2024) [First published in Dutch as In Drie Dagen naar Australie in 1935]. To Australia in Three Days. Albury, NSW: Uiver Memorial Community Trust. ISBN 9780646895123.
