= KLM Flight 608 =

1954 aviation accident

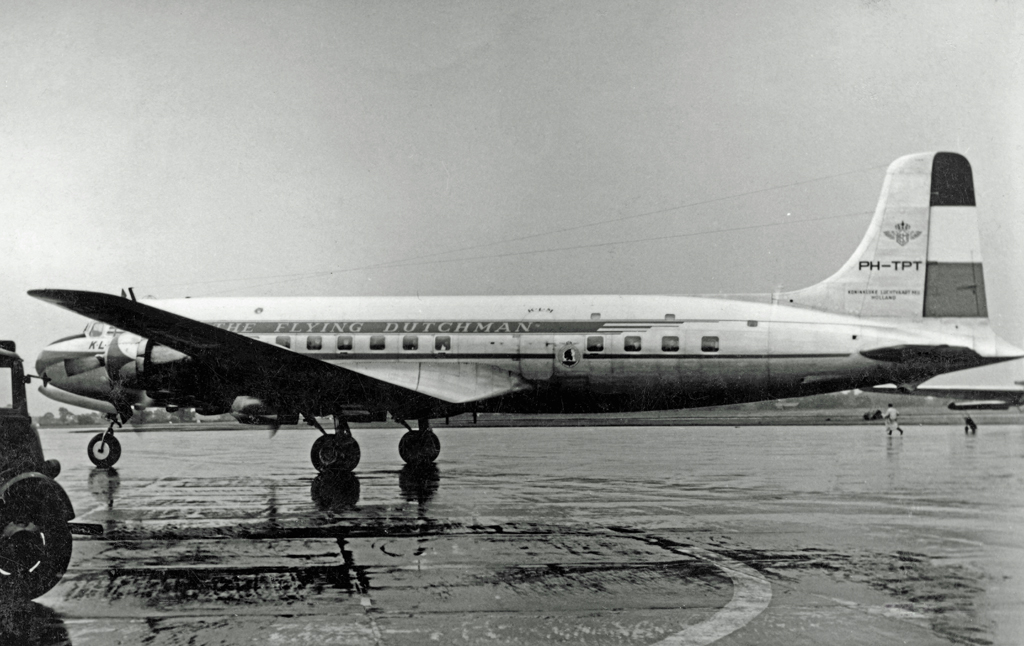
- A KLM Douglas DC-6 similar to the accident aircraft

Accident
- Date: 23 August 1954
- Summary: Undetermined
- Site: North Sea off Bergen aan Zee; 52.66667°N 4.33333°E

Aircraft
- Aircraft type: Douglas DC-6B
- Aircraft name: Willem Bontekoe
- Operator: KLM
- Registration: PH-DFO
- Flight origin: New York City
- Stopover: Shannon Airport, Ireland
- Destination: Schiphol International Airport, Netherlands
- Passengers: 12
- Crew: 9
- Fatalities: 21
- Survivors: 0

KLM Flight 608 (Note: A source states the flight number as Flight 633.) was an international scheduled passenger flight from New York City to Amsterdam. On 23 August 1954, the aircraft crashed in the North Sea off IJmuiden during the Shannon-Amsterdam leg of the flight. The crash killed all 21 passengers and crew on board.

== Aircraft ==
The Douglas DC-6B, construction number 43556 and line number 257, was delivered to KLM on 22 August 1952 as PH-TFO and christened Willem Bontekoe. On 6 March 1954, the aircraft was re-registered as PH-DFO.

== Flight ==
At 09:29 GMT, Flight 608 left Shannon Airport, bound for Amsterdam Airport Schiphol. Weather at the time was poor, with low clouds and heavy rain. Two hours later, the aircraft was cleared to descend to 5500 feet to prepare for landing. This was eventually changed to 3500 feet. At 11:35, air traffic controllers cleared Flight 608 to descend to 2500 feet but received no response. After an extensive search, floating debris from the aircraft was found at 16:10 off the Dutch coast near Bergen.

Witnesses on the ground noticed that the aircraft was behaving strangely: some reported hearing the aircraft pass overhead near Egmond where the "Green 2" airway crossed the coast and others reported seeing the aircraft at 12:01 passing overhead at low altitude heading back towards the sea. Yet others reported hearing a loud bang over the water, possibly from an explosion.

Salvage work using an experimental sonar system ended on 25 November, with 45-50% of the wreckage brought ashore.

== Cause ==
The cause of the crash was never determined. However, some investigators speculate that the crash may have been caused by an overheating of the aircraft's electrical system, an explosion of a pressure bottle, a cockpit window failure, or autopilot failure.

An investigator from the State Aviation Authority claims that the crash may have been caused by a faulty cabin heater. Because of the fumes from the heater, the crew may have attempted to open a cockpit window, and due to the risk of fire, the electrical system was probably turned off, explaining the radio silence.
