= KLM Flight 823 =

1961 aviation accident

Coordinates: 30°07′19″N 31°24′20″E

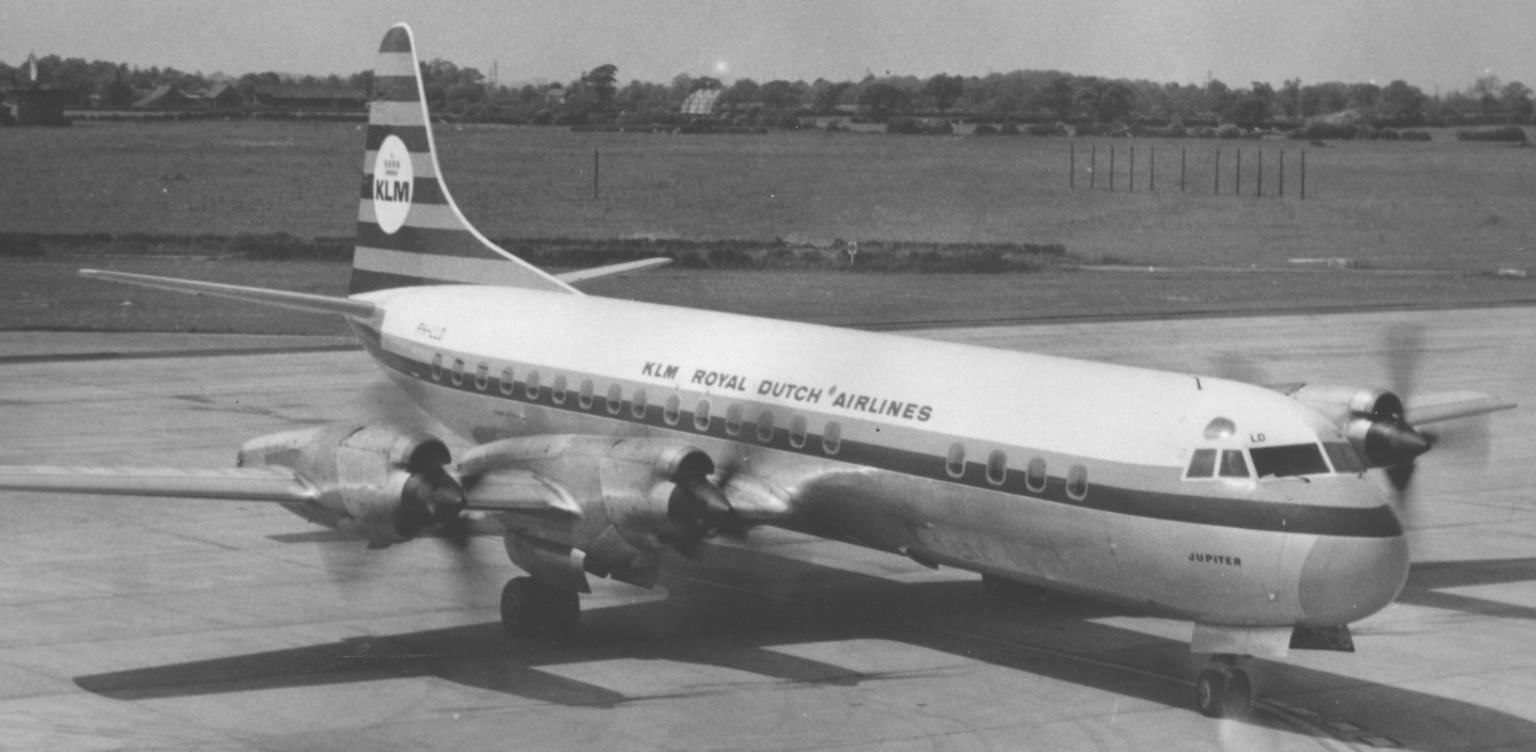
- A KLM Lockheed L-188 Electra similar to the aircraft involved

Accident
- Date: 12 June 1961
- Summary: Pilot error
- Site: Near Cairo International Airport, Egypt

Aircraft
- Aircraft type: Lockheed L-188 Electra
- Operator: KLM
- Registration: PH-LLM
- Flight origin: Amsterdam Airport Schiphol, Netherlands
- 1st stopover: Munich Airport, West Germany
- 2nd stopover: Rome, Italy
- 3rd stopover: Cairo International Airport, Egypt
- 4th stopover: Karachi, Pakistan
- Destination: Kuala Lumpur, Malaysia
- Passengers: 29
- Crew: 7
- Fatalities: 20
- Injuries: 16
- Survivors: 16

KLM Flight 823 was an air accident in 1961 involving a Lockheed L-188 Electra aircraft that crashed on approach to Cairo International Airport in Egypt after a flight from Rome in Italy. The crash killed 20 out of 29 passengers and 7 crew on flight 823.

== Aircraft ==
The accident aircraft was an American built Lockheed L-188 Electra turboprop-powered airliner, registration PH-LLM, built in 1960.

== Accident ==
KLM Flight 823 took off from Amsterdam on 11 June on a flight to Kuala Lumpur with stopovers at Munich, Rome, Cairo, and Karachi. Twenty-nine passengers and seven crew were aboard the aircraft on the third leg of the planned schedule, between Rome and Cairo. At 04:11 local time, the aircraft was on approach to runway 34 at Cairo International Airport but struck high ground about 4 km (2.5 mi) south of the airport. The aircraft broke up on impact, with both sections catching fire. Seventeen passengers and three crew were killed.

== Cause ==
The cause of the crash of KLM Flight 823 was attributed to pilot error, being blamed on the pilot-in-command not paying sufficient attention to his instruments.
