= KLM Flight 676 =

1935 aviation incident in Germany

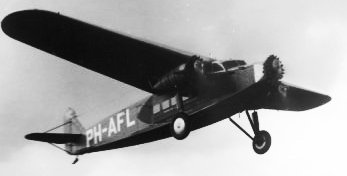
- PH-AFL, the involved aircraft, pictured in 1933

Occurrence
- Date: 6 April 1935
- Summary: Controlled flight into terrain during snowstorm; exact cause undetermined
- Site: Burgberg near Brilon, Germany

Aircraft
- Aircraft type: Fokker F.XII
- Operator: KLM
- Registration: PH-AFL
- Flight origin: Prague, Czechoslovakia (now Czech Republic)
- Stopover: Halle-Leipzig Airport, Germany
- Destination: Rotterdam, Netherlands
- Passengers: 2
- Crew: 5
- Fatalities: 7
- Survivors: 0

KLM Flight 676 was a scheduled international passenger flight operated by KLM that crashed on 6 April 1935 near Brilon, Germany. The aircraft, a Fokker F.XII named Leeuwerik (registration PH-AFL), flew into a mountain during a severe snowstorm and caught fire. All seven people on board were killed.

The crash occurred shortly after the opening of the Amsterdam–Prague air service and was one of several early fatal accidents of the KLM.

== Aircraft ==
The aircraft involved was a Fokker F.XII named Leeuwerik, registered PH-AFL. It was built in 1929–1930 at the Fokker factory in Amsterdam and was part of a fleet of eight aircraft of the type operated by KLM. The aircraft type was developed as an improvement over the Fokker F.VII and was used on both European and long-distance routes.

The aircraft was powered by three Pratt & Whitney Wasp C engines, each producing 425 horsepower. It had a cruising speed of approximately 205 km/h, a range of about 1,350 km, and a maximum takeoff weight of 7.2 tonnes. It could carry up to eight passengers on European routes.

== Crew and passengers ==
There were seven people on board the aircraft, consisting of five crew members and two passengers. All were killed in the crash. The crew consisted of Captain Piet Soer, second pilot E.A.J. Prillwitz, flight engineer Pieter Welman, Mechanic Hendrik Wingelaar and Radio operator Th. J. van der Klein. The two passenters were H.L.A. Briel and Willem de Vlugt.

=== Crew ===
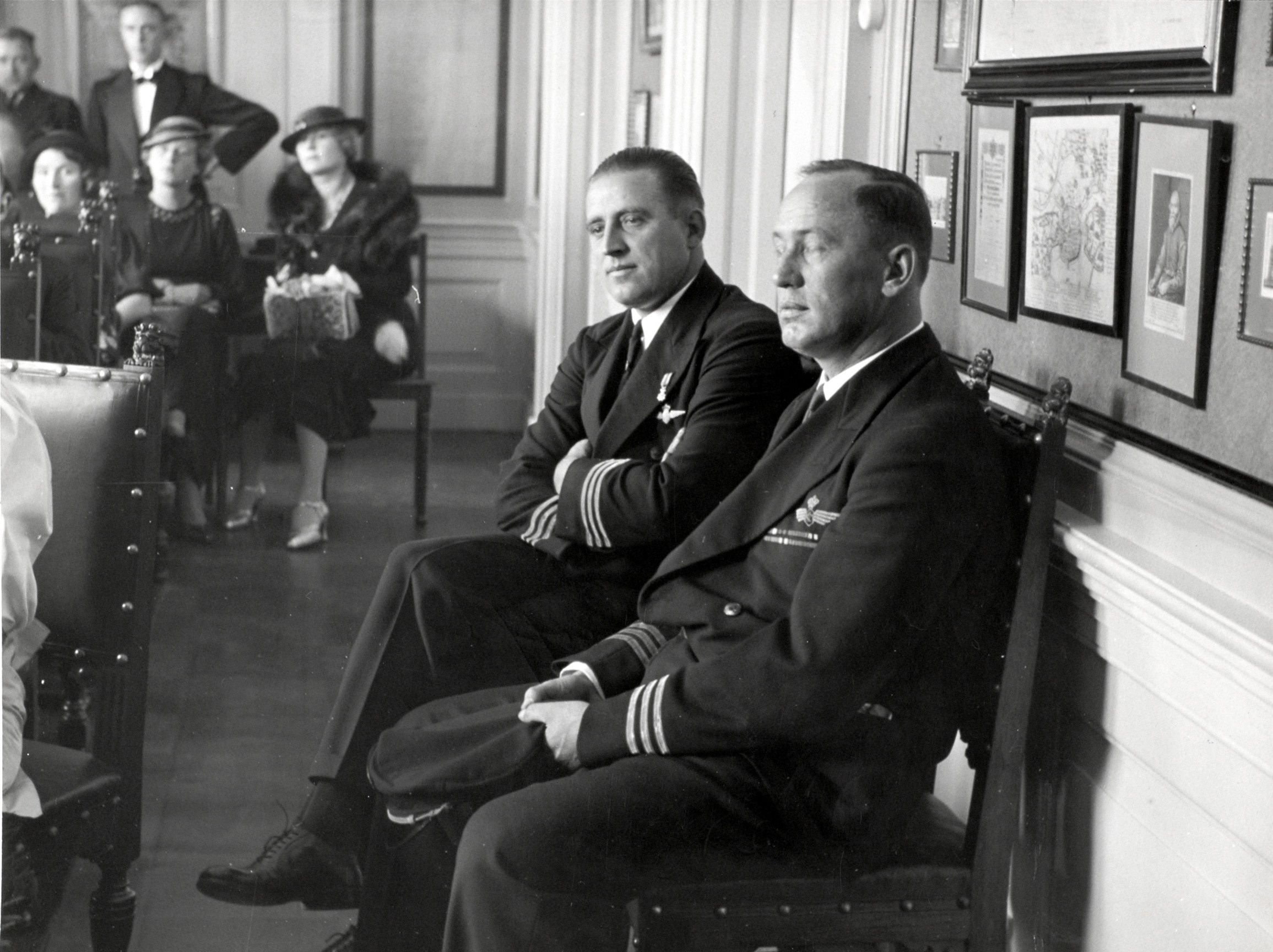
Pilot Piet Soer (pictured in 1934)

- Piet Soer (born 4 January 1903) with over 7,000 flight hours he was one of KLM's most experienced pilots. He had flown the route to the Dutch East Indies 17 times. In 1933, he gained recognition as second pilot under Smirnoff during the record flight of the Pelikaan to the Dutch East Indies. He joined KLM on 10 March 1927 and was married with one daughter.
- E. A. J. Prillwitz (born 1898) had been employed by KNILM since 1 September 1928 and was on European leave. He remained in Europe for several months to study the Douglas DC-2, which was to be introduced in the Dutch East Indies. During this period, he maintained his flying proficiency by regularly flying with KLM, including on this flight. In 1928, he was among the pilots who flew the Fokker F.VIIb/3m H-NAFC to the Dutch East Indies for KNILM. He was unmarried.
- Pieter Welman (born 20 March 1910 in Briel) had been employed by KLM as a flight engineer since 27 October 1930 and was due to be married within a few days.
- Hendrik Wingelaar (born 26 June 1904 in Bussum) had worked for KLM since 1 March 1934 after being sergeant mechanic in the military aviation service. He had been in Prague for several days on business and was travelling home as a passenger. He had been married for four weeks.
- Th. van der Klein (born 5 October 1910 in Rotterdam) joined KLM on 1 June 1934 and had accumulated 560 flight hours, including one journey to the Dutch East Indies. He was unmarried.

=== Passengers ===
- Hendrik L. A. Briel (aged 50) served as head procuration holder at the Algemene Kunstzijde Unie (AKU) in Arnhem. He was married and had three children.
- Willem de Vlugt (aged 31) was the son of the mayor of Amsterdam Willem de Vlugt. He studied at the Vrije Universiteit and obtained a doctorate in law. He was a member of the securities firm Ingewersen en Co. in Amsterdam. He was unmarried.

== Accident ==
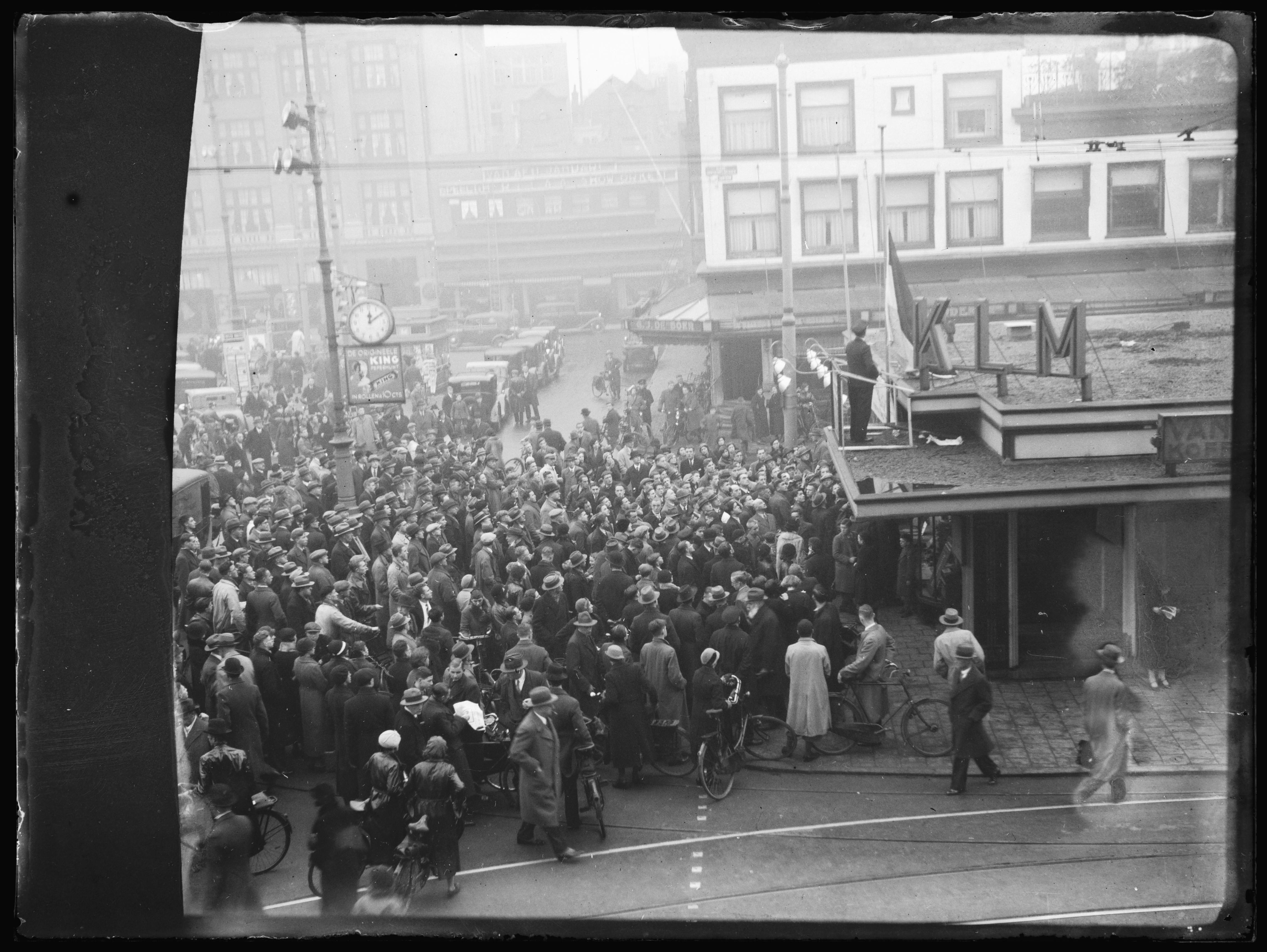
Flag at half-mast at the KLM office on Leidseplein after the crash

On 6 April 1935, the aircraft departed from Prague, Czechoslovakia for Rotterdam, the Netherlands with an intermediate stop at Halle-Leipzig. After departing the stopover at 13:14 local time, the aircraft encountered extremely poor weather conditions, including a heavy snowstorm, limited visibility of around 200 metres, and thunderstorms.

At 14:39, the pilot reported to Cologne radio station that he was retracting the antenna due to lightning. This was the last communication received from the aircraft..

Shortly afterward, the aircraft crashed into the Burgberg mountain near Brilon in the Sauerland region, approximately 80 kilometres east of Dortmund. The aircraft caught fire on impact and was completely destroyed. All seven occupants were killed.

Contemporary reports described how the aircraft was flying at low altitude in the snowstorm before striking the terrain. Witnesses reported hearing the engines and then a sudden impact followed by flames.

== Cause ==
Initial reports suggested that ice accumulation on the wings may have caused the aircraft to lose altitude and crash into the mountain.

However, the official investigation by German authorities concluded that the aircraft had been flying too low for reasons that could not be definitively determined. The report suggested that the pilot may have descended to maintain visual contact with the ground in poor weather conditions. Other possible contributing factors included reduced engine performance or concerns about icing, but the exact cause was never established.

== Aftermath ==
The crash caused widespread shock in the Netherlands, occurring shortly after the launch of the Amsterdam–Prague route. It followed closely after the crash with the Uiver, contributing to national mourning and concern about air travel safety. Also in the following decades the crash was remembered among the most severe accidents of the KLM; taking place in the "disaster year" of the KLM next to the crash with the Uiver in July crashes of the Maraboe in Iran, Kwikstaart near Schiphol and the Gaai in Switzerland. Due to these crashes, the KLM had in July a significant shortage of personnel and equipment.

Soon after the disaster, though only after the first extensive reports about it had already been published, the German press authorities imposed a ban on publishing details of the accident.

=== Burials ===
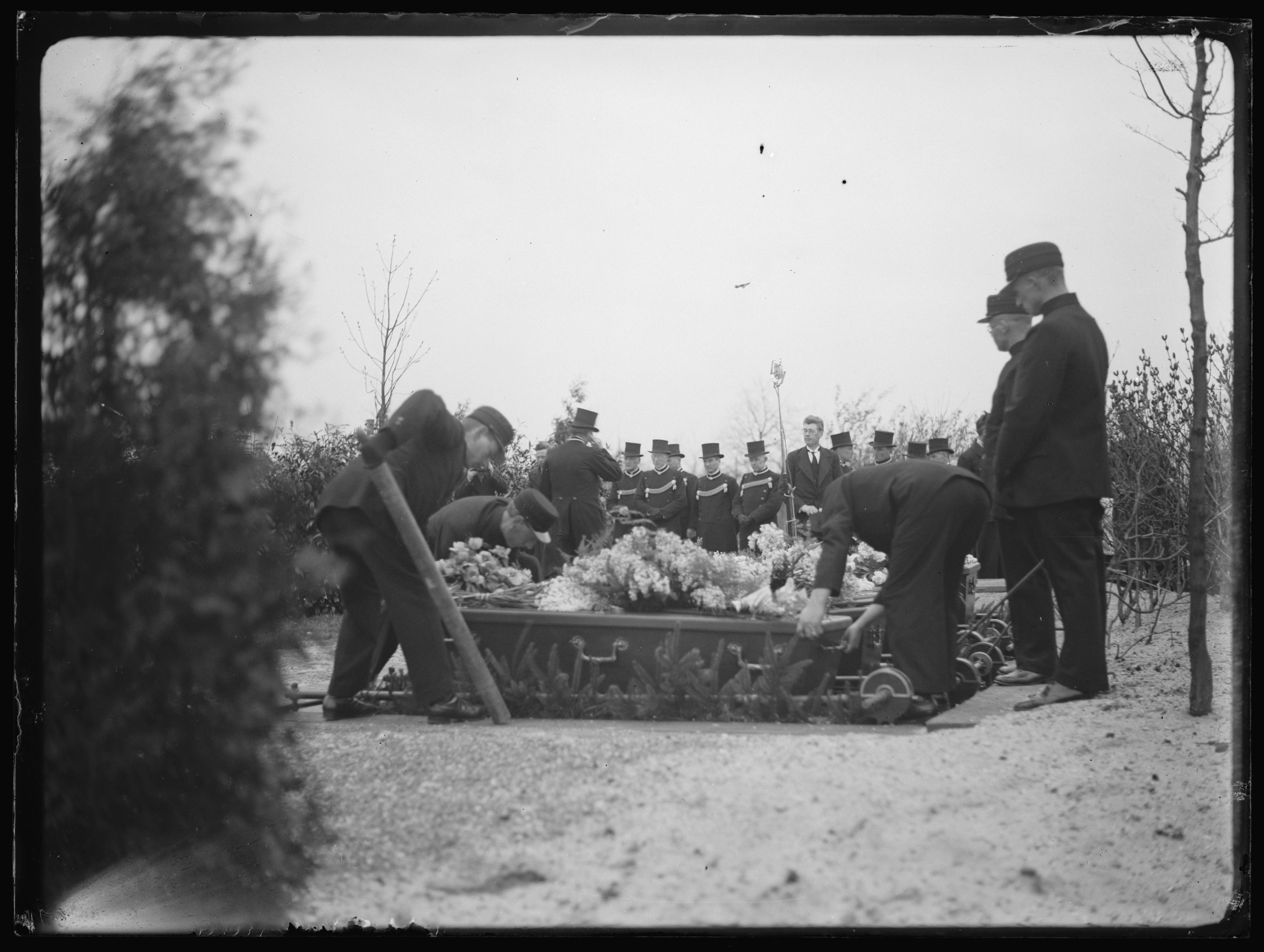
Funeral of the crew members in Amsterdam

A memorial service was held in Brilon, attended by representatives of KLM, local authorities, and international officials. Flags in the town were flown at half-mast in honor of the victims.

The victims were later transported to the Netherlands for burial. Most crew members were interred in a common grave at Zorgvlied cemetery in Amsterdam, while the passengers were buried separately.

=== Memorial ===
In Havelt, the hometown of pilot Piet Soer, was a square named after him ("Piet Soerplein") in 1966. In 1967 a monument was placed, a Drenthe field stone with a bronze plaque.
