= R3D =

R3D may refer to:

- Douglas DC-5
- RealD Cinema
- R3D, an American Christian rock band
