= C110 =

C110 or C-110 may represent:

- Bombardier CSeries C110, later redesignated CS100, now called Airbus A220-100
- USAAF's C-110 transport, a variant of the Douglas DC-5
- A model of HP 9000 workstation
- A model Seiko Epson Epson Stylus inkjet printer
- Honda Super Cub C110 Sports Cub version
- A model of Nissan Skyline, 1972–1977
