= Flight 676 =

Flight 676 might refer to:

- KLM Flight 676 that crashed in Germany on 6 April 1935
- China Airlines Flight 676 that crashed in Taiwan on 16 February 1998
