= KNILM =

Airline of the former Dutch East Indies

Koninklijke Nederlandsch-Indische Luchtvaart Maatschappij
- Founded: 16 July 1928
- Commenced operations: 1 November 1928
- Ceased operations: 1 August 1947
- Hubs: Tjililitan Airport
- Focus cities: Bandoeng, Semarang, Medan, Soerabaja, Palembang, Bandjarmasin
- Headquarters: Amsterdam
- Key people: H. Nieuwenhuis; TH.J. De Bruyn

Koninklijke Nederlandsch-Indische Luchtvaart Maatschappij (in English: Royal Dutch Indies Airways) was the flag carrier of the former Dutch East Indies. Headquartered in Amsterdam, KNILM was not a subsidiary of the better-known KLM (Royal Dutch Airlines), despite the similar name. The airline had its headquarters in Amsterdam and an office in on the grounds of Tjililitan Airfield (current Halim Perdanakusuma International Airport) in Batavia (current Jakarta).

== Founding and expansion ==
KNILM was founded on 16 July 1928 as the NILM by a group of 32 Netherlands Indian investors with a capitalization of NLG 5 million. To prevent confusion with an existing insurance company Nillmij, it was appended with the Koninklijk (Royal) title on 15 October 1928. The airline operated in the Dutch East Indies (present-day Indonesia), and later, parts of Southeast Asia and Australia.

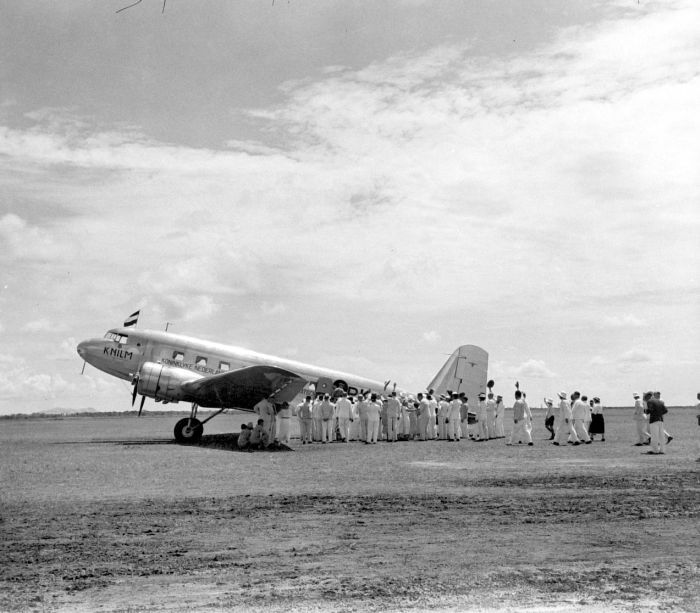
DC-2 at Oelin

Its first regular operations were between Batavia (now Jakarta) - Bandung, and Batavia - Semarang, starting on 1 November 1928. The ceremony was held at Cililitan airport in Batavia (now Halim Perdanakusuma International Airport). The Batavia-Semarang flight was later extended to Surabaya. Gradually, the services were expanded to include other islands in the archipelago, namely to Palembang and Medan in Sumatra, Balikpapan and Tarakan in Kalimantan, and Denpasar in Bali. Immediately before the Pacific War, KNILM also created a network in the eastern part of the East Indies archipelago, serving towns such as Ambon. For this purpose, amphibious aircraft were used, due to the lack of airstrip facilities in the region.

As early as 1930, KNILM began its first international flight to Singapore. On 3 July 1938 KNILM began operations to Sydney, stopping at Darwin, Cloncurry and Charleville. KNILM did not fly to the Netherlands, as the Amsterdam-Batavia weekly service was operated by KLM.

=== Routes (in 1936) ===
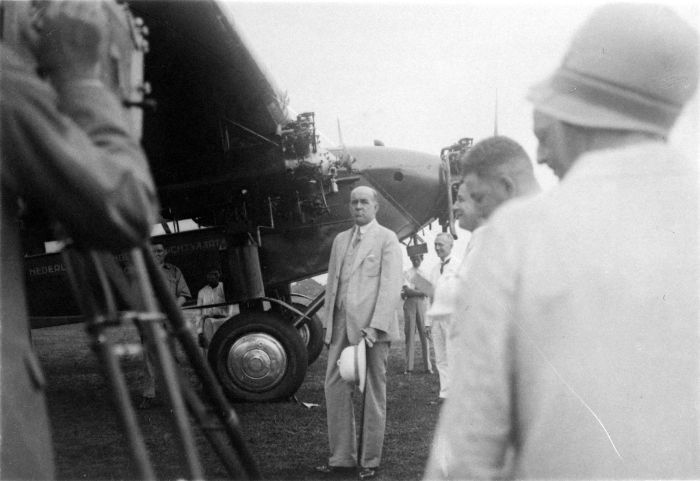
Opening first KNILM route to Semarang and Bandung in November 1928. Governor-General Jhr. Mr. A.C.D. de Graeff attending, Tjililitan airport near Batavia, Java.

- Batavia-Bandung (twice daily in wet season, thrice daily in dry season)
- Batavia-Semarang-Surabaya (daily)
- Batavia-Palembang-Singapore-Pekanbaru (weekly)
- Batavia-Palembang-Pakanbaru-Medan (weekly)
- Batavia-Surabaya-Banjarmasin-Balikpapan-Tarakan (weekly)
- Medan-Penang-Bangkok (weekly)
- Surabaya-Denpasar-Kupang-Darwin (weekly)

== War and demise ==
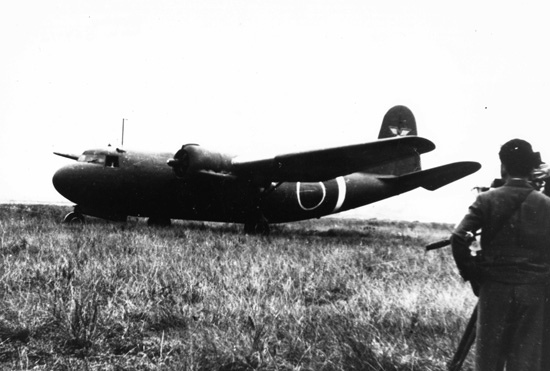
An ex-KNILM Douglas DC-5 in use with the Imperial Japanese Army Air Service, circa 1942-45

During the Japanese attack of the Dutch East Indies, KNILM was utilized for evacuation flights and transport of troops. On December 28, 1941, a KNILM Douglas DC-3 "Nandoe" (PK-ALN) was destroyed on the ground by Japanese fighters at Medan, killing all crew members and passengers. Immediately before and after the Japanese invasion on 1 March 1942, all KNILM aircraft with sufficient range were evacuated to Australia. On 7 March 1942, one day before the capitulation of Java, the last KNILM aircraft took off from the Boeabatoeweg in Bandung. A number of KNILM aircraft in Darwin were destroyed by the Japanese during the bombing of Darwin. In all, 11 KNILM aircraft managed to escape to Australia: 3 Douglas DC-5s, 2 DC-3s, 2 DC-2s and 3 Lockheed Model 14 Super Electras. In mid-May 1942 the remaining aircraft were sold to the American military.

After Indonesian independence the KNILM could no longer operate due to the fighting between Indonesian nationalists and the Dutch military. All flights in the period were flown using military aircraft, coordinated through the Netherlands Indies Government Air Transport (NIGAT). On paper, KNILM was reinstated to operate charter flights to eastern Indonesian locations. Starting on 16 November 1946 it operated a weekly trans-Pacific flight between Batavia and Los Angeles. The service was performed with four-engined DC-4s of the NIGAT. It was not successful and was discontinued after a few months.

KNILM was officially disbanded on 1 August 1947, and the remaining assets were transferred to KLM, which created the KLM Interinsulair Bedrijf (the precursor of Garuda Indonesia) to operate air services between islands in the Indonesian archipelago.

== Aircraft fleet ==
- 7 Fokker F.VIIb/3m introduced between 1928 and 1930. Registered as H-NAFA to H-NAFD, later PK-AFA to PK-AFD.
- 2 Fokker F.XII, introduced in 1931. Registered PK-AFH and PK-AFI.
- 3 Douglas DC-2, introduced in 1935.
- 3 De Havilland Dragon Rapide introduced in 1935 for aerial mapping in Dutch New Guinea.
- 2 Sikorsky S-38 amphibious aircraft, introduced in 1936 for aerial mapping in Dutch New Guinea.
- 5 Lockheed Model 14 Super Electra, introduced in 1938 for the Australia service.
- 2 Grumman G-21A Goose amphibious aircraft, introduced in 1940.
- 3 Douglas DC-3 transferred from KLM in 1940 after the occupation of the Netherlands.
- 4 Douglas DC-5 introduced in 1940–1941. These account for 80% of the aircraft type made for civilian use.
- 3 Sikorsky S-43 amphibious aircraft introduced in 1941.

== See also ==
- PK-AFV
- Garuda Indonesia
- Aviation in Indonesia
