= Burgberg =

Burgberg may refer to the following places in Germany:

settlements

- Burgberg im Allgäu, a municipality in Oberallgäu, Bavaria

mountains

- Burgberg (Baunatal), a hill in Baunatal, Hesse
- Burgberg (Erlangen), a hill in Erlangen, Bavaria
- Burgberg (Schauenburg), a hill in Schauenburg, Hesse
- Burgberg (ridge), a range of hills in Lower Saxony
- Großer Burgberg, a hill overlooking Bad Harzburg, Lower Saxony
- Burgberg (Bergstein), a hill in the northern Eifel, near Hürtgenwald, North Rhine-Westphalia
