= AB Aerotransport =

1924–1948 airline in Sweden

- Founded: March 27, 1924
- Commenced operations: June 2, 1924
- Ceased operations: October 1, 1950

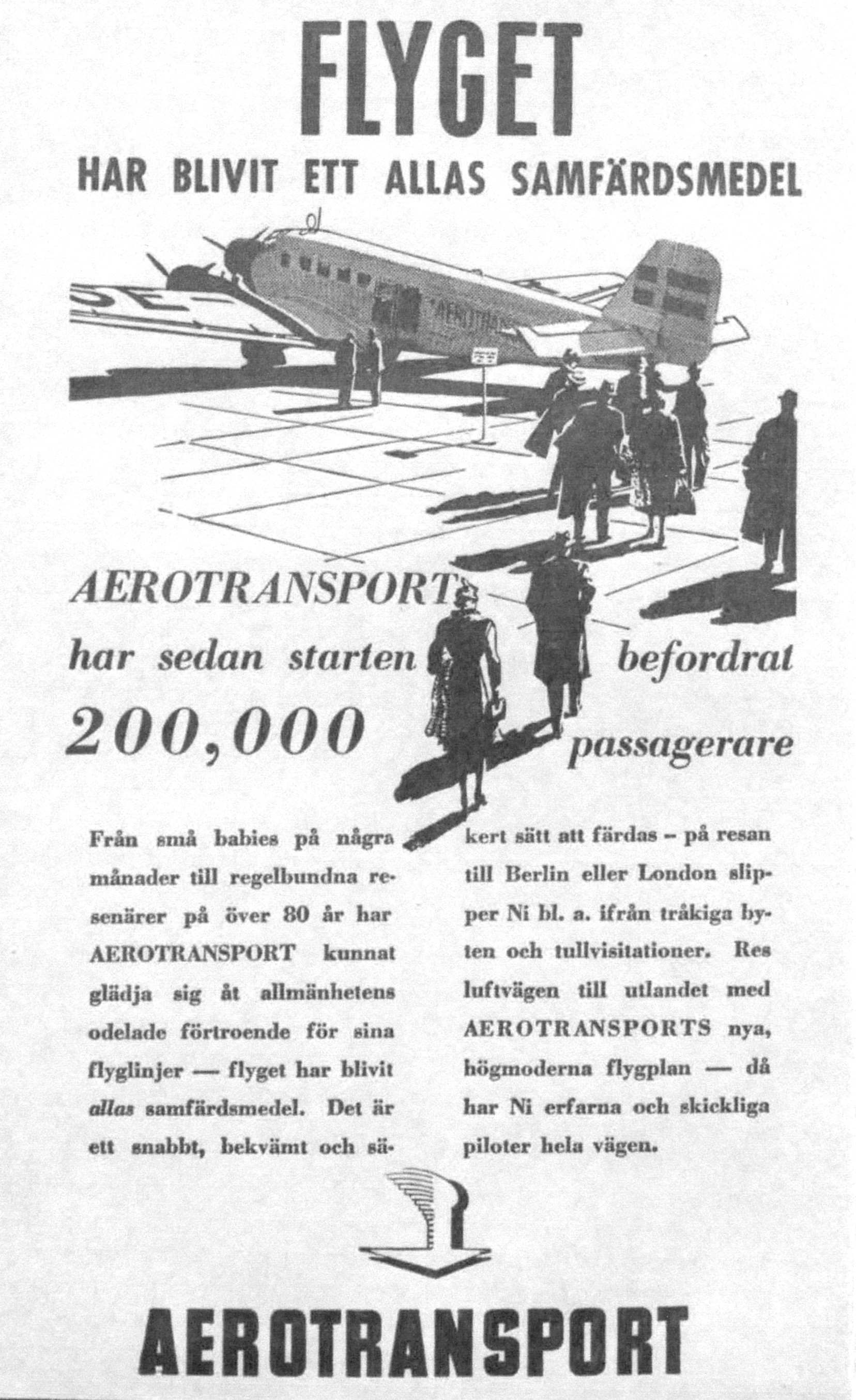
Advertisement of 1937

AB Aerotransport (ABA) was a Swedish government-owned airline which operated during the first half of the 20th century and was merged into what would become the SAS Group. ABA was established on 27 March 1924 under the name Aktiebolaget Aerotransport by Carl and Adrian Florman together with Ernst Linder, John Björk and Johan Nilsson. Its first flight was on 2 June 1924 between Stockholm, Sweden and Helsinki, Finland. Needing more funds, it became government-owned in 1935. ABA was merged with Swedish Intercontinental Airlines (SILA) in 1948 and airline operations would ultimately be merged into the international SAS Group in 1950.

== History ==
In 1925 the company co-operated a route between Stockholm and Berlin with Lufthansa, as well as a mail route that connected Stockholm with Malmö, Sweden, Amsterdam, Netherlands and London, England. Passenger service to Moscow, USSR begun in the late 1930s.

During World War II ABA tried to maintain their network, but the route to Moscow ceased in 1941 and the route to Berlin ceased in 1945. During the war ABA had a courier flight between Stockholm and Scotland. After the German occupation of Europe, ABA started new routes to Paris, Oslo and Prestwick.

In June 1948, after a Swedish report, the government-owned ABA and privately owned SILA were merged on a 50-50 basis, to form a new airline named ABA. SILA had become the Swedish part of SAS in 1946, which at that time only a co-operation between DDL in Denmark and DNL in Norway. However, on October 1, 1950, representatives from the three airlines signed a consortium agreement where they appointed SAS to run the airline operations and the three national airlines only to be holding companies.

== Fleet ==
ABA was the first airline with three-engine passenger aircraft when in 1925, ABA bought three Swedish Junkers G.24 from AB Flygindustri. During the following years ABA used and bought several different aircraft (e.g. Junkers F.33, F.34, G.23, G.24). For the longer routes a Fokker F.XII was used.

In 1937 ABA became the second European operator of the Douglas DC-3 after KLM. This opened opportunities to fly "longer flights" for example to Moscow. In 1939 ABA started to mark their aircraft with Swedish Air Lines.

Manufacturer	Model	Quantity	Introduced	Retired
Junkers	F.13	10	1924	1938
Junkers	G.24	5	1925	1932
Junkers	W 33	2	1929	1931
Junkers	Ju 52	8	1932	1948
Fokker	F.XII	1	1932	1946
Northrop	Delta	1	1934	1937
Northrop	Gamma	1	1934	1936
Fokker	F.VII	1	1934	1942
Fokker	F.XXII	1	1935	1936
Junkers	W 34	2	1935	1940
Douglas	DC-3	10	1937	1948
Junkers	Ju 86	1	1938	1940
Boeing	B-17	9	1944	1948
Douglas	DC-4	3	1946	1948

The aircraft used in the airline's first flight, a Junkers F.13 registered as S-AAAC and later as SE-AAC, is now on display at the National Museum of Science and Technology in Stockholm.

== Accidents and incidents ==
- August 31, 1932: An AB Aerotransport Junkers G.24me (SE-AAE, Svealand) crashed at Tubbergen, Netherlands while attempting a forced landing following engine failure, killing the two crew.
- June 9, 1936: An AB Aerotransport Fokker F.XXII (SE-ABA, Lappland) crashed while attempting an emergency landing at Bulltofta Airport following triple engine failure, killing one of 13 on board. The pilot had opened the throttles instead of the propeller pitch control while the engines were in weak mixture, causing the engines to quit.
- August 27, 1943: An AB Aerotransport Douglas DC-3-268 (SE-BAF, Gladan) crashed 70 km (43 mi) off Hirtshals, Denmark, killing all seven on board; the aircraft was probably shot down by a German fighter. No wreckage has ever been found.
- October 22, 1943: An AB Aerotransport Douglas DC-3-268 (SE-BAG, Gripen) was attacked by a Luftwaffe Junkers Ju 88; the pilot attempted a forced landing at sea, but the aircraft struck cliffs of Hållö island near Smögen, killing 13 of 15 on board.
- December 4, 1945: An AB Aerotransport Boeing B-17G Flying Fortress struck a hill in Stallarholmen while on approach to Bromma Airport, killing the six crew. The aircraft had been flying too low during the approach.
- August 9, 1947: An AB Aerotransport Douglas DC-3F (SE-BAY) overran the runway on landing at Bulltofta Airport, killing one of five on board.
- October 26, 1947: AB Aerotransport Flight 1629, a Douglas DC-4-1009 (SE-BBG, Sunnan), struck Mount Hymettus while on approach to Hassani Airport, killing all 44 on board.

== See also ==
- SAS Group
- Transport in Sweden
