= Fokker F.XXXVI =

Dutch airliner

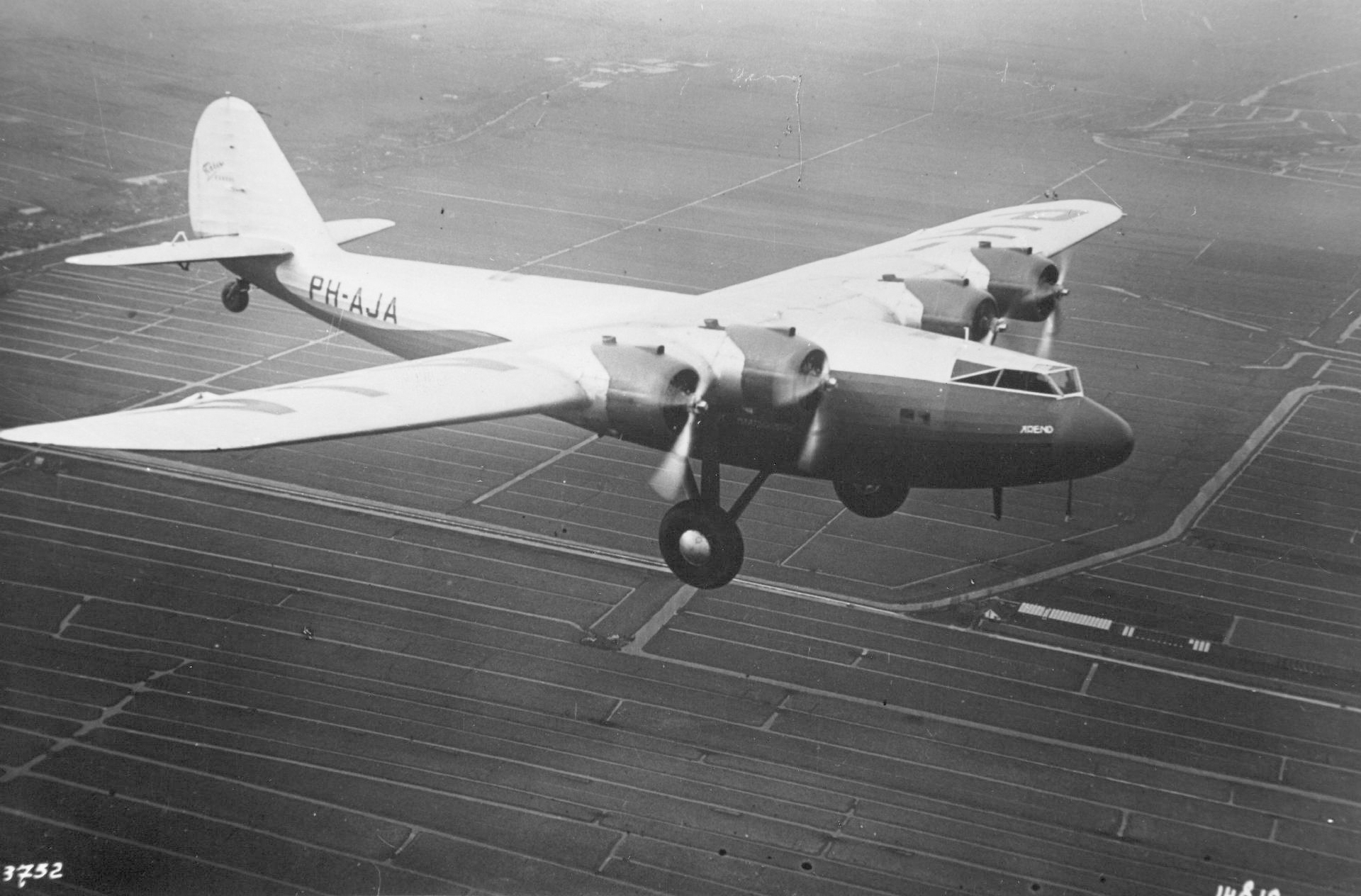

General information
- Type: 32-passenger transport
- Manufacturer: Fokker
- Primary users: KLM Scottish Aviation
- Number built: 1

History
- Introduction date: 1935
- First flight: 22 June 1934
- Retired: 1940
- Variant: Fokker F.XXII

The Fokker F.XXXVI (also known as the Fokker F.36) was a 1930s Dutch four-engined 32-passenger airliner designed and built by Fokker. It was the largest transport designed and built by Fokker. Only one was built, and it was used for some commercial routes starting in 1935, and later aviation training by the British Royal Air Force until 1940.

The aircraft came on the market at a time when airliners were switching to all metal aircraft, whereas the F.36 had an all wood wing with a fabric covered metal-framed fuselage. The aircraft had a quiet interior and good payload, but the range was low and it had a single seat cockpit in the forward-most position. An improved model with a side-by-side cockpit, the F.37, was designed but not built. With no orders for either model, no more of the design was made.

The Fokker F.XXII (F.22) was a similar but smaller version of this aircraft, of which four were made.

== Development ==
The Fokker F.XXXVI registered PH-AJA first flew on 22 June 1934 and was a high-wing cantilever monoplane with a fixed tailwheel landing gear. In Fokker tradition, the wing was an all wood structure and the fuselage was fabric covered steel tube. It was powered by four Wright Cyclone radial piston engines mounted in the wing leading edge, and carried 4 crew and 32 passengers in four eight-seat cabins. In an unusual decision, Fokker engineers went to great length in soundproofing the passenger cabin, enabling passengers to converse in a normal voice after takeoff. It was delivered to KLM and operated on European routes from March 1935. Although it had a good payload it was aerodynamically and structurally inferior to the Douglas DC-2 and DC-3 preferred by Fokker's main customer, KLM. Furthermore, as the maintenance advantages of all-metal aircraft became clear, and with no interest from other airlines, only one was built.

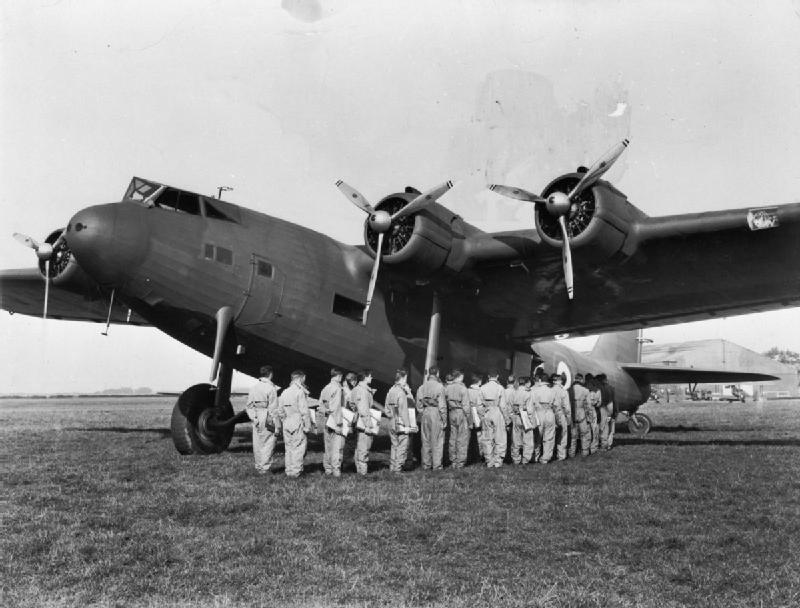
In service with the RAF as a navigation trainer

KLM sold the aircraft in 1939 to Scottish Aviation for use as a crew and navigation trainer for the Royal Air Forces No.12 Elementary Flying Training School, which was operated by Scottish Aviation. It was scrapped in 1940 after it burnt out in a take-off accident.

Airspeed Ltd. in Great Britain arranged a license to build F.XXXVIs for the British market as the Airspeed AS.20, but no orders were received.

=== Fokker F.37 ===
Despite KLM's choice of the all-metal Douglas DC-2, Fokker refused to accept the fact that his time-honored fabric and metal construction method was outdated, so in 1936, Fokker developed an improved version of the F.XXXVI, the F.37. It featured retractable landing gear with hydraulic suspension and four 850 hp (634 kW) Wright GR-1820-G Cyclone engines. To save weight, the frame was to be made from chrome-molybdenum alloy tubing instead of steel and covered with fabric. Because of the higher takeoff weight, the wing spars and ribs were strengthened. The cockpit was redesigned to compete with the DC-2, and this allowed the pilots to sit next to each other. Fokker planned to build eight aircraft and deliver them between March and July 1937. However, KLM preferred all-metal aircraft, and instead it was the DC-3 that entered service and not the F.37.

== Operators ==
=== Civil operators ===
Netherlands

- KLM

United Kingdom

- Scottish Aviation

=== Military operators ===
United Kingdom

- Royal Air Force (operated by Scottish Aviation)

== Specifications ==
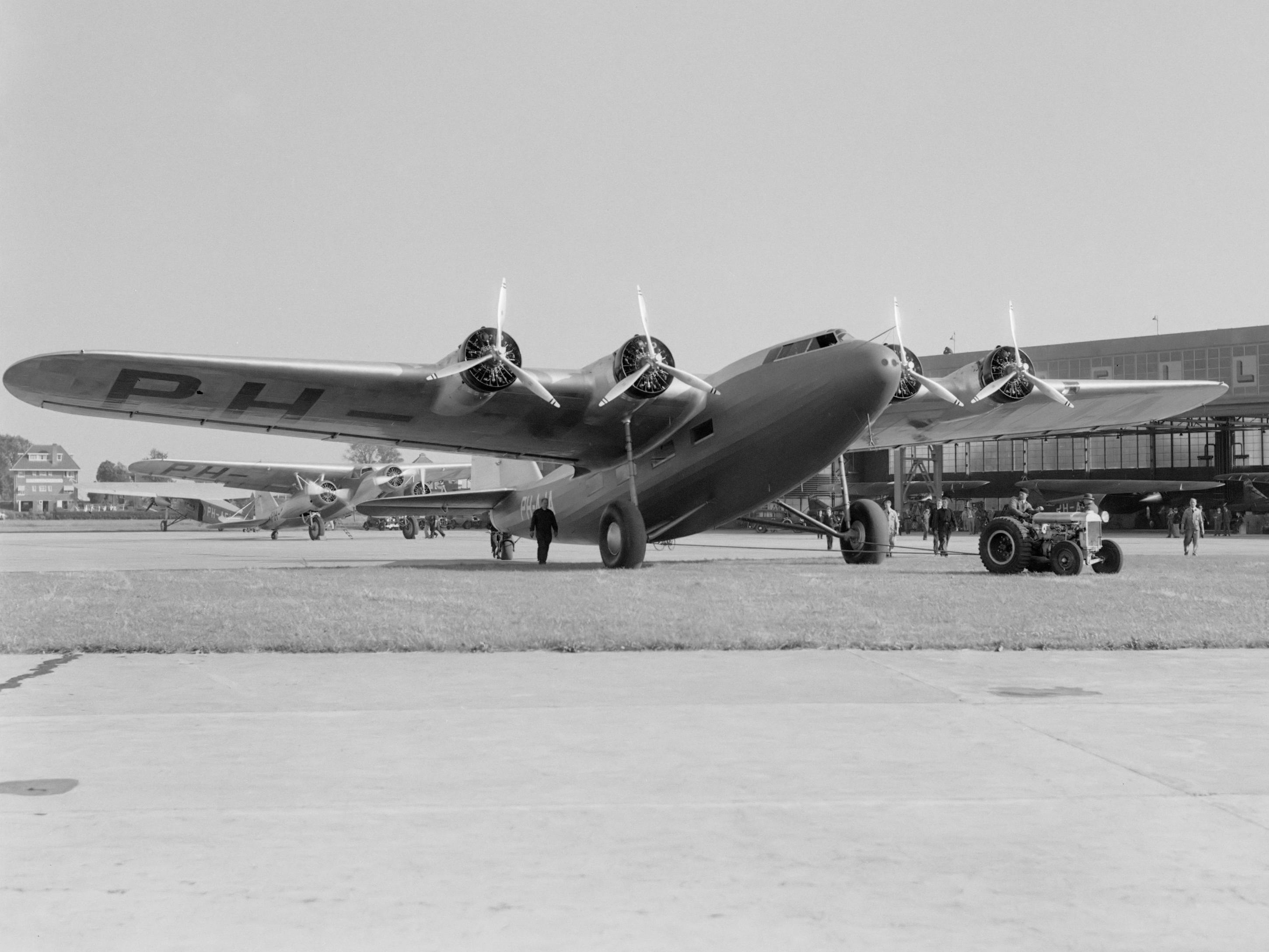
Fokker F.XXXVI (1934)

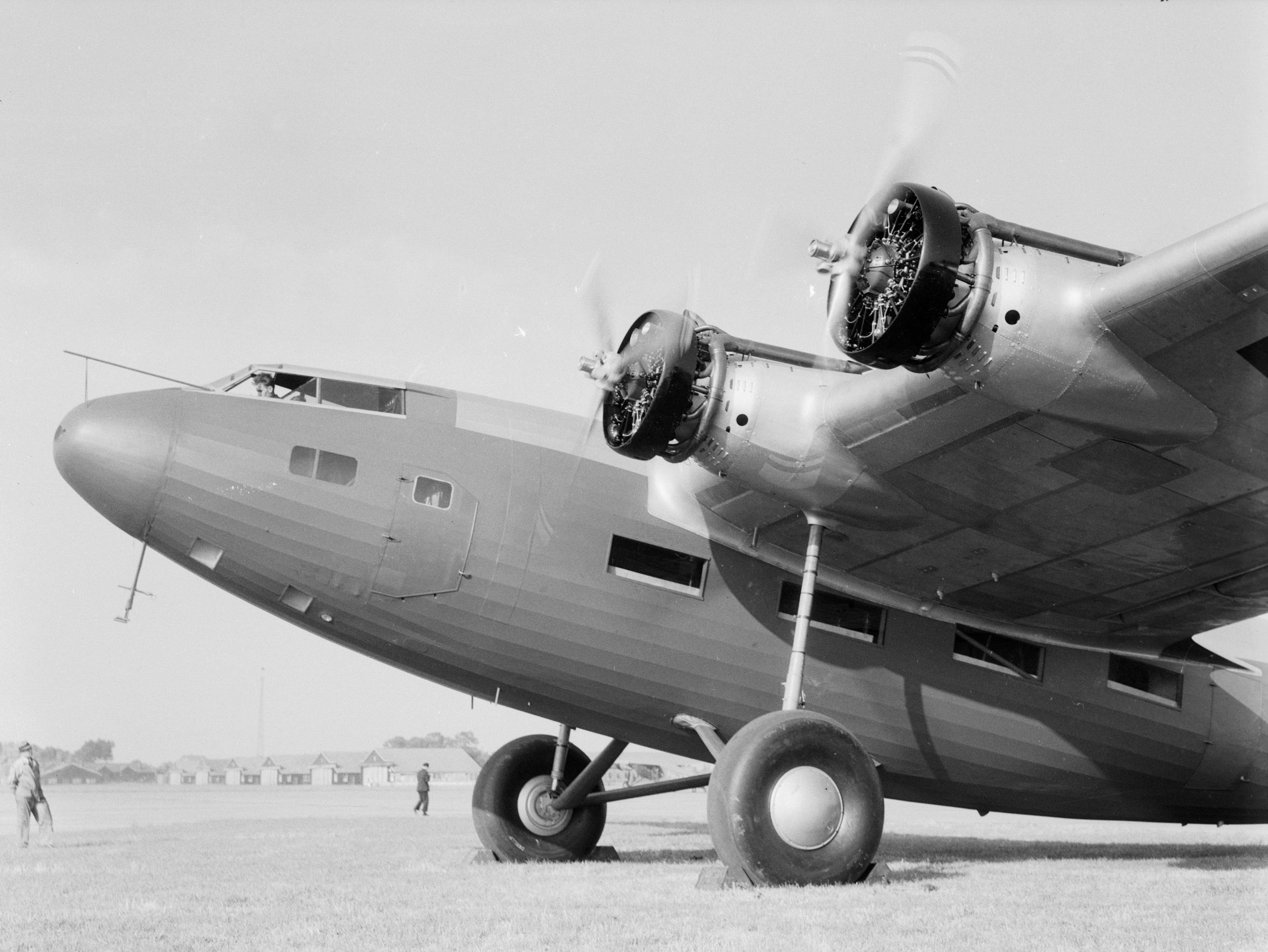
F.XXXVI

Data from Jackson p. 373 and de Leeuw p.102

General characteristics

- Crew: 4
- Capacity: 32-passengers
- Length: 24.0 m (78 ft 8 in)
- Wingspan: 33.0 m (108 ft 2 in)
- Height: 8.3 m (27 ft 3 in)
- Wing area: 172 m^{2} (1,850 sq ft)
- Empty weight: 10,300 kg (22,700 lb)
- Gross weight: 16,500 kg (36,366 lb)
- Powerplant: 4 × Wright Cyclone SGR-1820-F2 radial piston engines , 560 kW (750 hp) each

Performance

- Cruise speed: 280 km/h (165 mph, 143 kn)
- Range: 1,536 km (960 mi, 830 nmi)

Related lists

- List of aircraft of the Royal Air Force

== Bibliography ==
- de Leeuw, R. (1994). Fokker Commercial Aircraft. The Hague: Fokker.
- A.J. Jackson, British Civil Aircraft since 1919 Volume 2, 1974, Putnam, London, ISBN 0-370-10010-7
- The Illustrated Encyclopedia of Aircraft (Part Work 1982–1985), 1985, Orbis Publishing, Page 1895/6
- Taylor, H.A. (1970). Airspeed Aircraft since 1931. London: Putnam. ISBN 0-370-00110-9.
