= Fokker F.XXII =

Dutch airplane

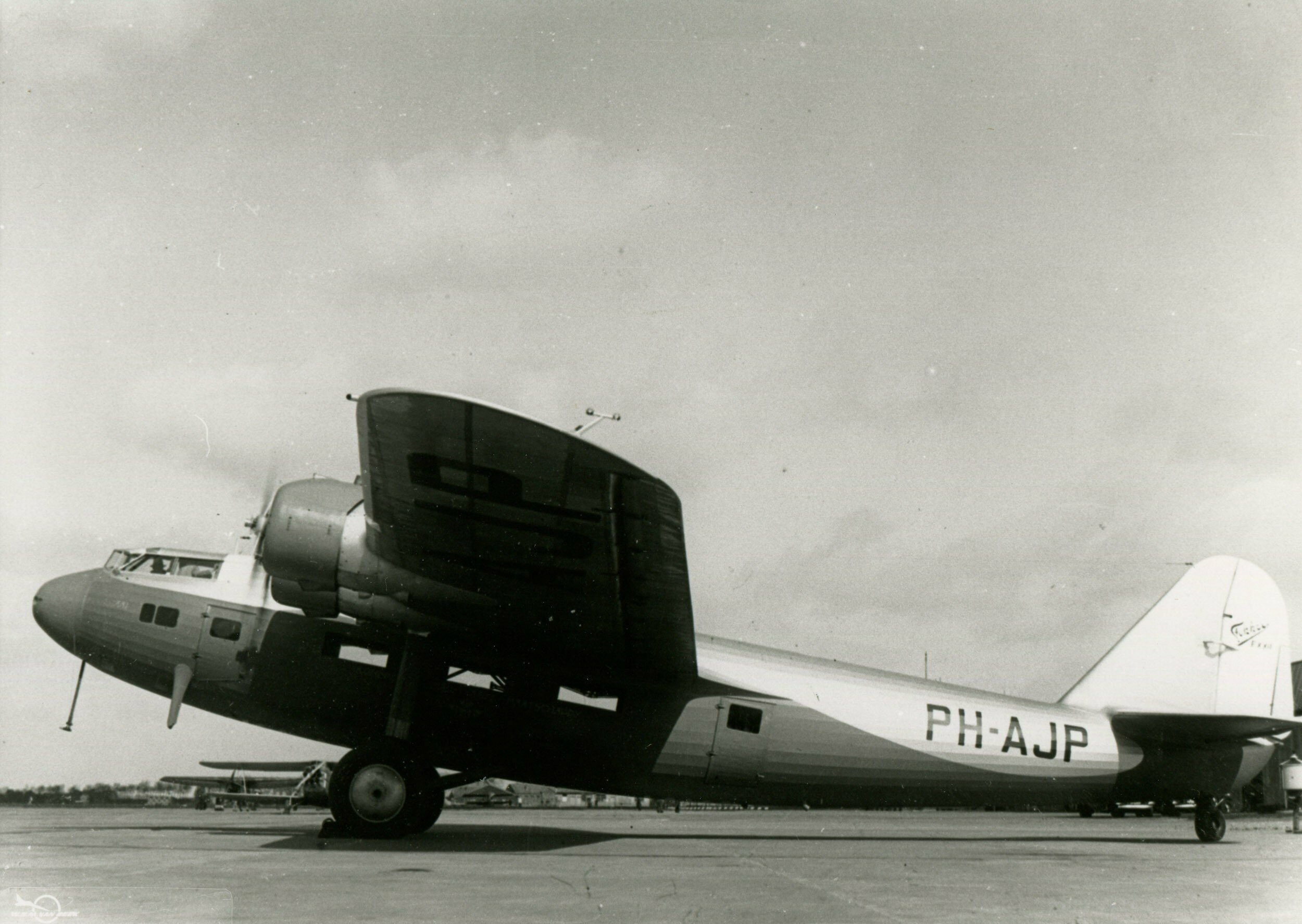
- KLM Fokker F.XXII

General information
- Type: 22-passenger transport
- Manufacturer: Fokker
- Primary users: KLM Royal Air Force; Scottish Aviation; AB Aerotransport
- Number built: 4

History
- Introduction date: 1935
- First flight: 1935
- Retired: 1947
- Variant: Fokker F.XXXVI

The Fokker F.XXII (also called Fokker F.22) was a 1930s Dutch four-engined 22-passenger airliner designed and built by Fokker.

== Development ==
Developed as a smaller version of the Fokker F.XXXVI the F.XXII is a high-wing cantilever monoplane with a fixed tailwheel landing gear. It was powered by four Pratt & Whitney Wasp radial piston engines mounted in the wing leading edge. The first aircraft registered PH-AJP first flew in 1935, and was followed by two production aircraft for KLM. A fourth aircraft was built for the Swedish airline AB Aerotransport.

A version with retractable landing gear and powered by four 650 hp Gnome-Rhône 9KF engines, the F.XXIII (or F.23), was developed in 1935. The increased engine power allowed a higher weight and increased speed by 12 mph (19 km/h), but this reduced range from 1,095 mi (1,762 km) to 980 mi (1,577 km). The heavier engines did not justify the revised performance, so the F.XXIII was never built.

== Operational history ==
One KLM aircraft crashed in July 1935 and the other two continued in service until August 1939, when they were sold to British American Air Services and Scottish Aviation in the United Kingdom. A month later the British American Air Services aircraft was also acquired by Scottish Aviation as a navigation trainer. In October 1941, they were both impressed into service with the Royal Air Force and used as transports and crew trainers. One aircraft survived the war to be returned to Scottish Aviation who used it for services between Prestwick and Belfast until it was grounded at the end of 1947.

The Swedish aircraft, which was named Lappland, flew a regular Amsterdam–Malmo service until it was destroyed in an accident in June 1936.

Airspeed Ltd. in Great Britain arranged a license to build F.XXIIs for the British market as the Airspeed AS.16, but no orders were received.

== Operators ==
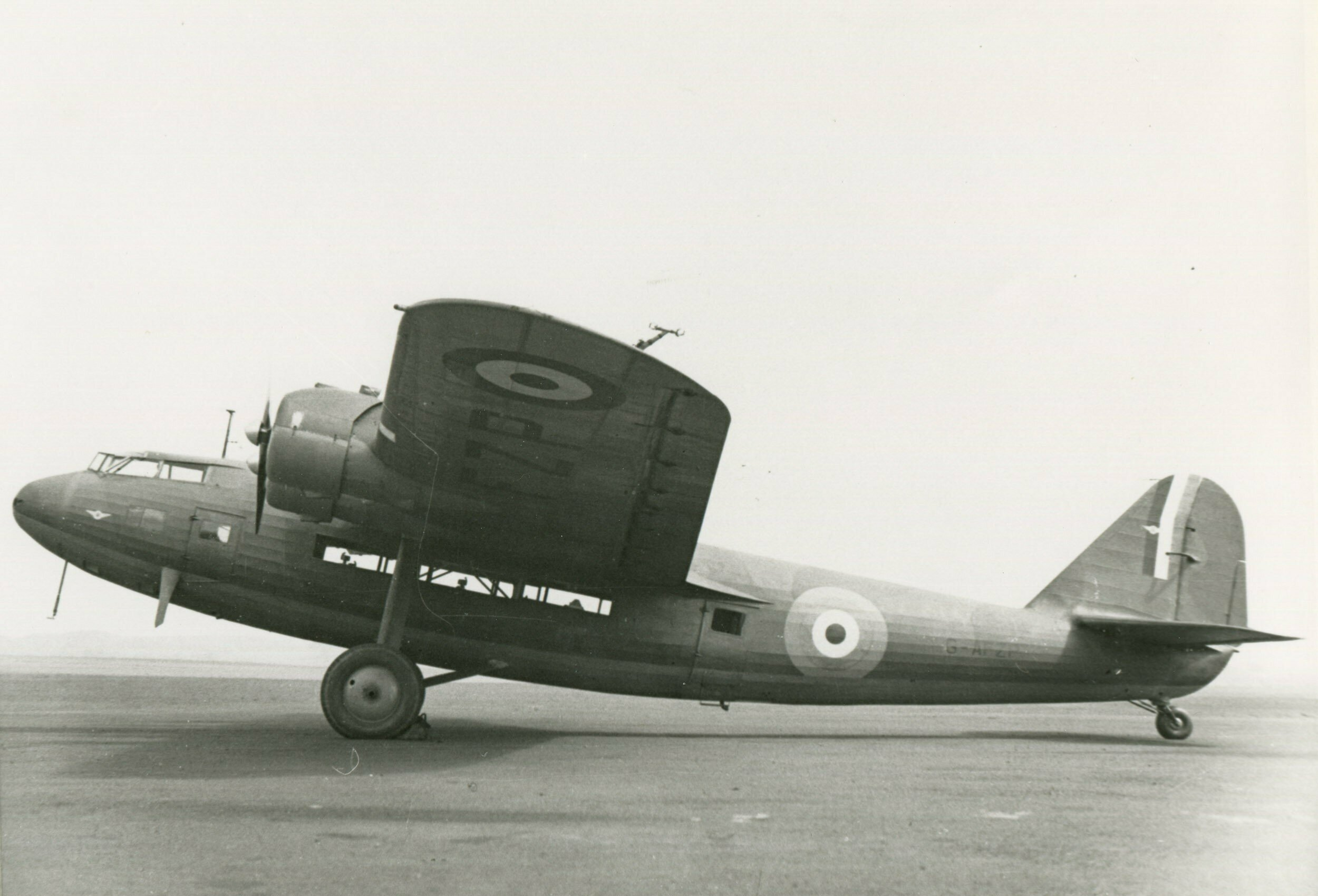
RAF F.XXII

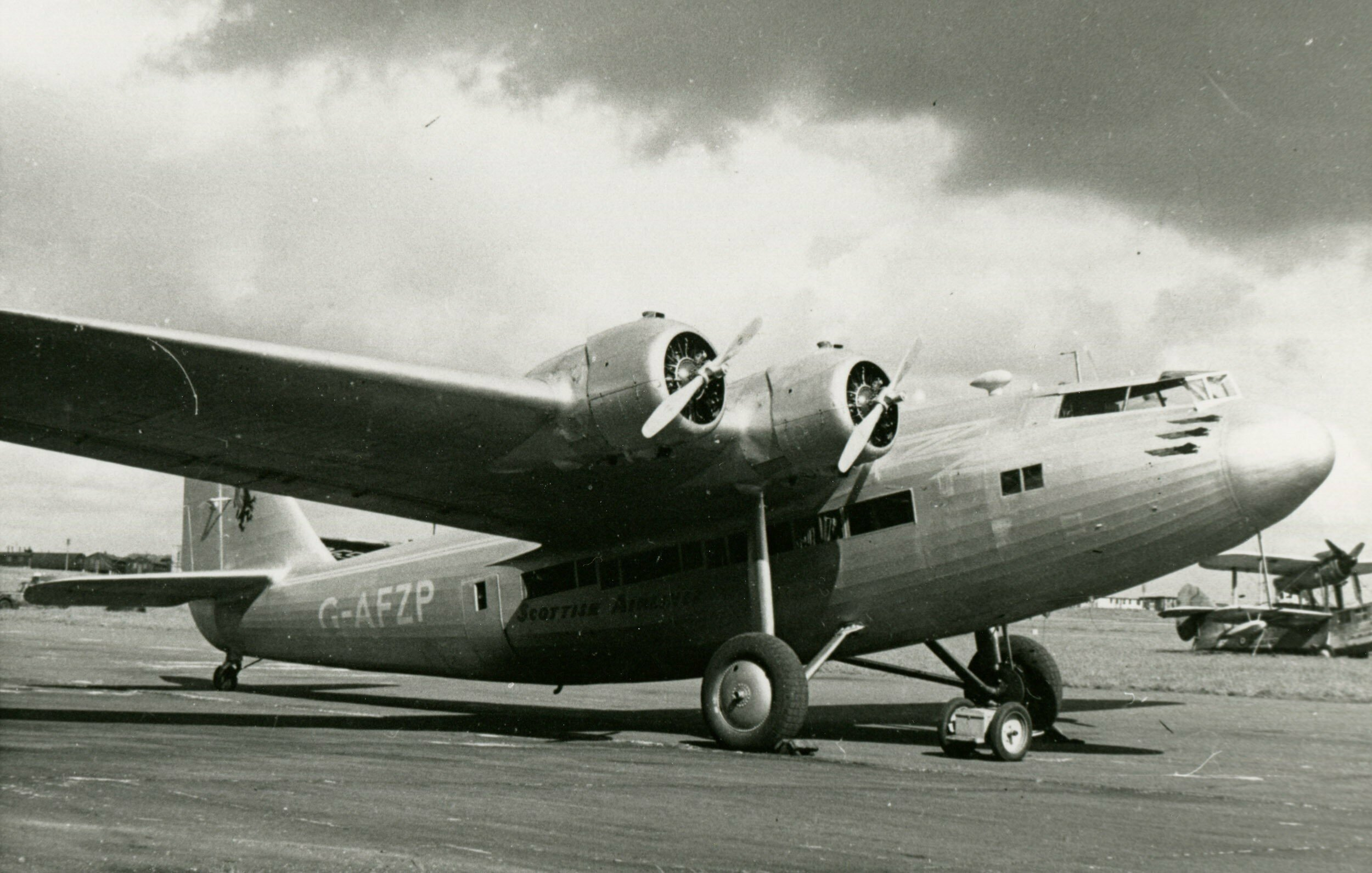
F.XXII operated by Scottish Airlines

=== Civil operators ===
Netherlands

- KLM

Sweden

- AB Aerotransport

United Kingdom

- British American Air Service
- Scottish Airlines
- Scottish Aviation

=== Military operators ===
United Kingdom

- Royal Air Force
  - No. 24 Squadron RAF

== Accidents and incidents ==
- On July 14, 1935, a KLM F.XXII (PH-AJQ, Kwikstaart) crashed on climbout from Schiphol Airport due to double engine failure, killing six of 20 on board.
- On June 9, 1936, an AB Aerotransport F.XXII (SE-ABA, Lappland) crashed at Bulltofta Airport while attempting an emergency landing following triple engine failure, killing one of 13 on board.
- On July 3, 1943, RAF F.XXII HM159 ditched at Loch Tarbert, Scotland due to an in-flight fire, killing all 20 passengers and crew on board.

== Specifications (variant) ==
Data from The Illustrated Encyclopedia of Aircraft (Part Work 1982-1985), 1985, Orbis Publishing, Page 1895/6

General characteristics

- Crew: 2
- Capacity: 22-passengers
- Length: 21.52 m (70 ft 7.25 in)
- Wingspan: 30 m (98 ft 5 in)
- Height: 4.60 m (15 ft 1.25 in)
- Empty weight: 8,100 kg (17,857 lb)
- Gross weight: 13,000 kg (28,660 lb)
- Powerplant: 4 × Pratt & Whitney Wasp T1D1 9-cylinder radial piston , 373 kW (500 hp) each

Performance

- Maximum speed: 285 km/h (177 mph, 154 kn)
- Range: 1,350 km (839 mi, 729 nmi)
- Service ceiling: 4,900 m (16,075 ft)

Related lists

- List of aircraft of the Royal Air Force
