= Fokker F.XII =

F.XII
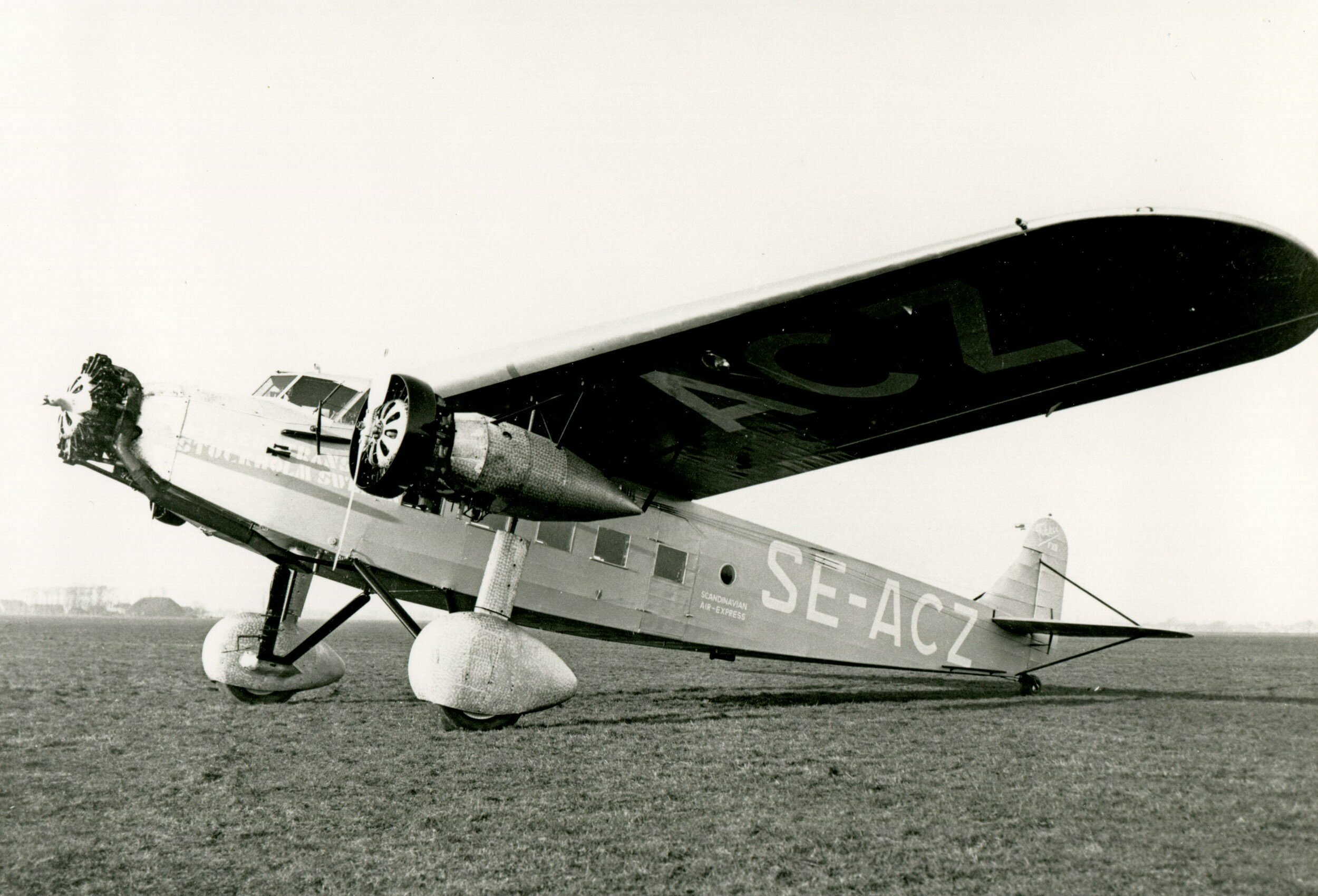
- F.XII operated by Swedish carrier AB Aerotransport

General information
- Type: Passenger transport
- Manufacturer: Fokker

History
- Manufactured: 11
- Introduction date: 5 March 1931 by KLM
- First flight: January 1931
- Retired: 1947

The Fokker F.XII was a three-engined high-winged monoplane airliner produced in the 1930s by the Dutch aircraft manufacturer Fokker. Two aircraft were built under license by Danish Orlogsværftet. The first was powered by 347 kW (465 hp) Bristol Jupiter VI radial engines and the second, an improved model, the F.XIIM, was about 20 km/h (12 mph) faster than the Dutch-built F.XIIs.

== Operational history ==
Ten aircraft were ordered by KLM/KNILM for operation on the Amsterdam to Batavia route. The first service left Amsterdam on 5 March 1931 arriving in Batavia on 14 March 1931. The aircraft was used regularly on the route from the 1 October 1931. In 1932 KLM started to use the larger Fokker F.XVIIIs on the route and the F.XIIs were then used for European destinations.

In 1936 KLM sold four of the aircraft to the British Crilly Airways to operate between London and Madrid, this didn't get the support of the Spanish government and the aircraft were passed to British Airways for use on European routes to Paris and Scandinavia. They were soon considered obsolete by British Airways and sold with some ending up with Spanish Nationalists for use in the civil war.

Two of KLMs remaining F.XIIs were sold to British Airways and one to a company in French West Africa but ended up in Spanish Republican hands. The two KNILM aircraft were still in Java when the Japanese invaded in 1942. One additional aircraft the eleventh to be built was ordered by AB Aerotransport of Sweden in 14-passenger configuration and was used in Sweden until destroyed in a hangar collapse in 1947.

== Operators ==
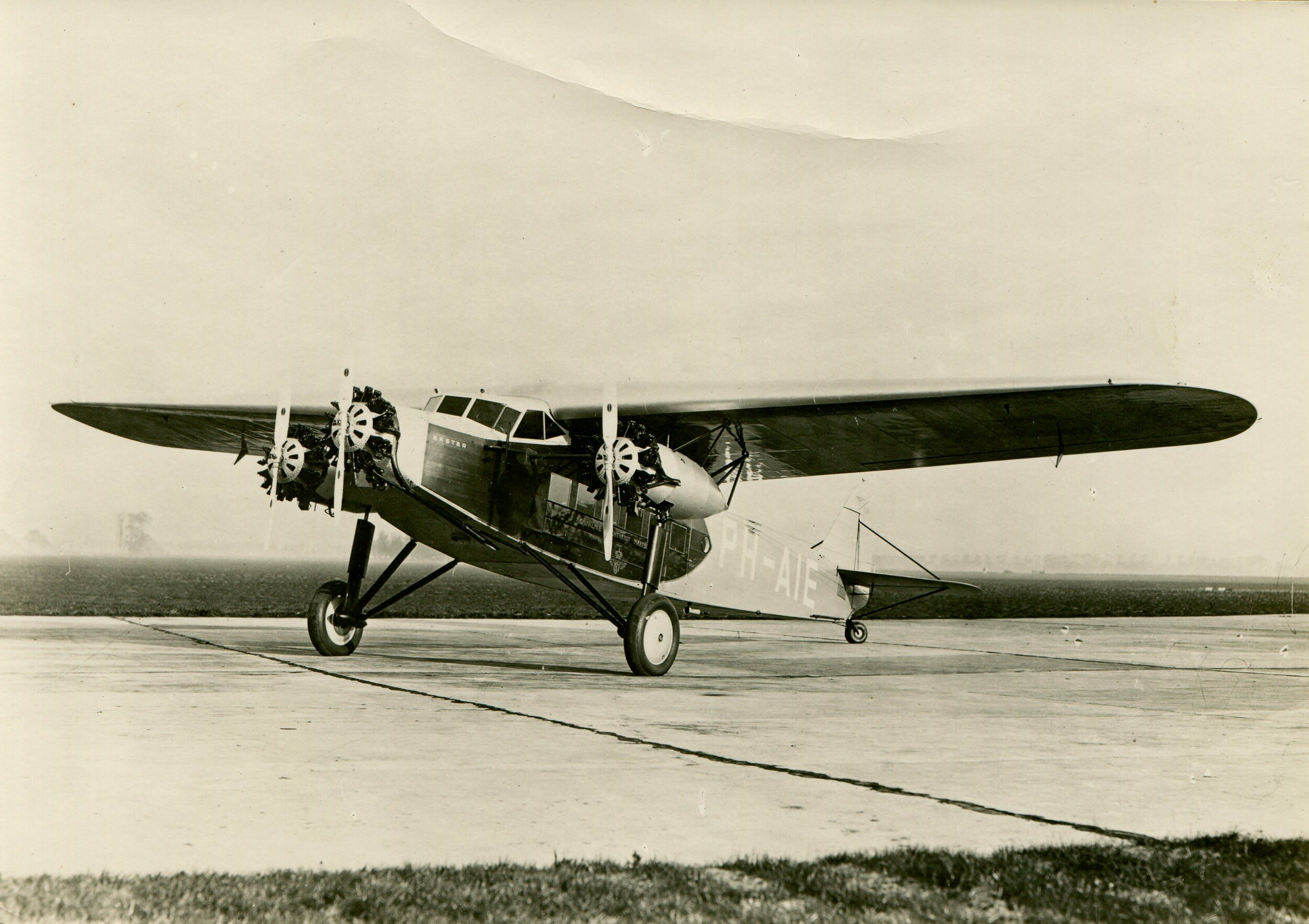
KLM Fokker F.XII

Denmark

- Det Danske Luftfartselskab - two Danish built aircraft, one delivered in 1933 and one in 1935

Dutch East Indies

- Koninklijke Nederlandsch-Indische Luchtvaart Maatschappij (KNILM) - two aircraft operated from 1931 to 1942.

Netherlands

- Koninklijke Luchtvaart Maatschappij (KLM) - eight aircraft operated from 1931 to 1936.

Spain

- Spanish Republican Air Force

Sweden

- AB Aerotransport - one aircraft delivered in 1932.

United Kingdom

- British Airways - six aircraft operated in 1936
- Crilly Airways - four aircraft bought from KLM in 1936 but not operated.

== Accidents and incidents ==
- 6 Apr 1935 - PH-AFL named Leeuwerik of KLM crashed in bad weather at Brilon, Germany, while flying from Prague to Amsterdam. All seven onboard killed.
- 19 November 1936 - British Airways Ltd plane crashes into a hill at night in fog on approach to Gatwick Aerodrome, killing two crew and injuring two others.

== Specifications ==
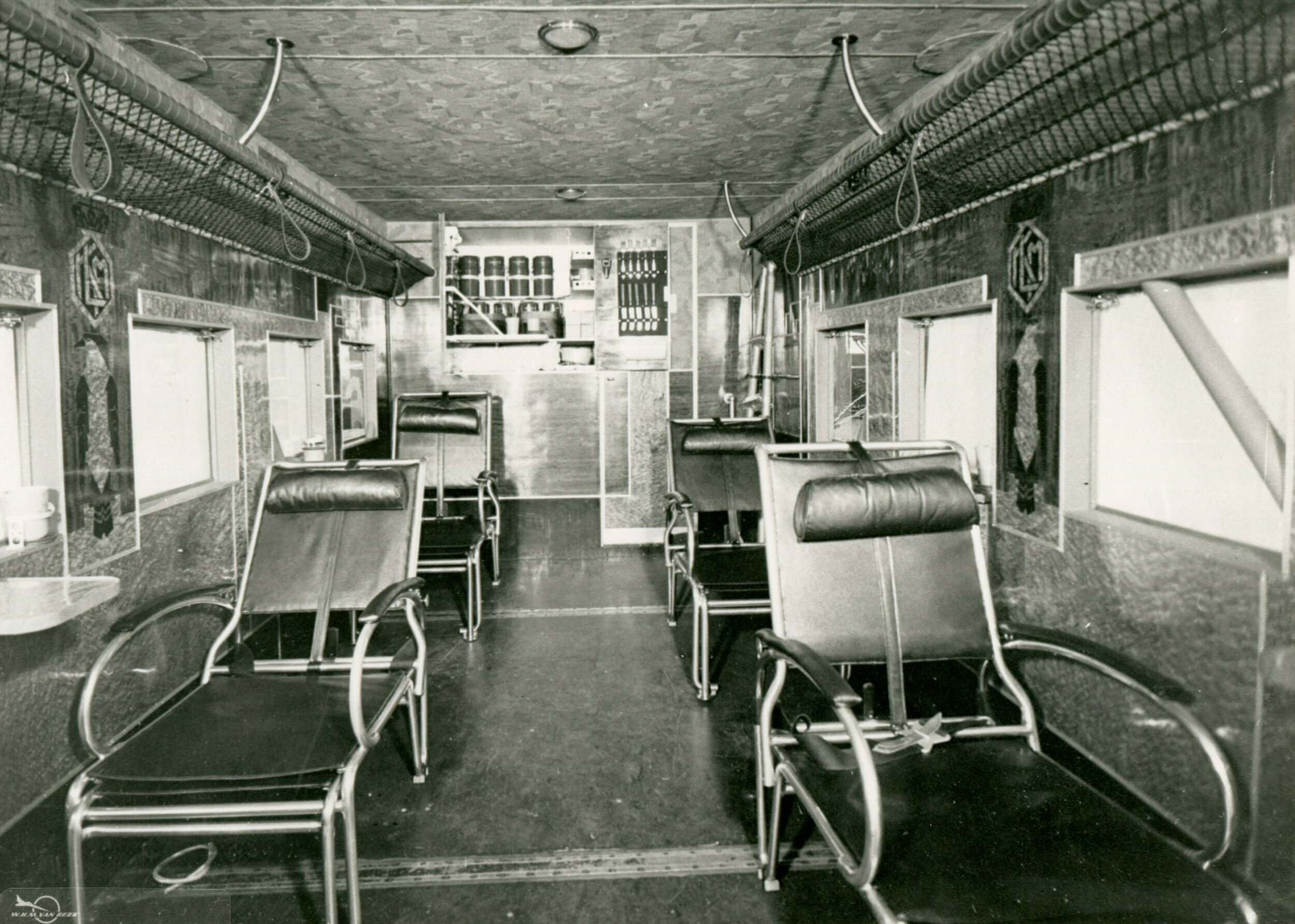
Seating layout in a KLM F.XII aircraft

Data from The Fokker F.XII

General characteristics

- Crew: 2
- Capacity: 16 passengers
- Length: 17.50 m (57 ft 5 in)
- Wingspan: 22.99 m (75 ft 5 in)
- Height: 4.29 m (14 ft 1 in)
- Wing area: 83.0 m^{2} (893 sq ft)
- Empty weight: 4,350 kg (9,591 lb)
- Gross weight: 7,251 kg (15,986 lb)
- Powerplant: 3 × Pratt & Whitney Wasp C radial, 317 kW (425 hp) each

Performance

- Maximum speed: 220 km/h (137 mph, 119 kn)
- Cruise speed: 190 km/h (118 mph, 103 kn)
- Range: 1,270 km (790 mi, 690 nmi)
- Service ceiling: 4,500 m (14,760 ft)

== Bibliography ==
- Cortet, Pierre (April 2002). "Des avions alliés aux couleurs japonais" [Allied Aircraft in Japanese Colors]. Avions: Toute l'Aéronautique et son histoire (in French) (109): 17–21. ISSN 1243-8650.
