= Burgberg (Schauenburg) =

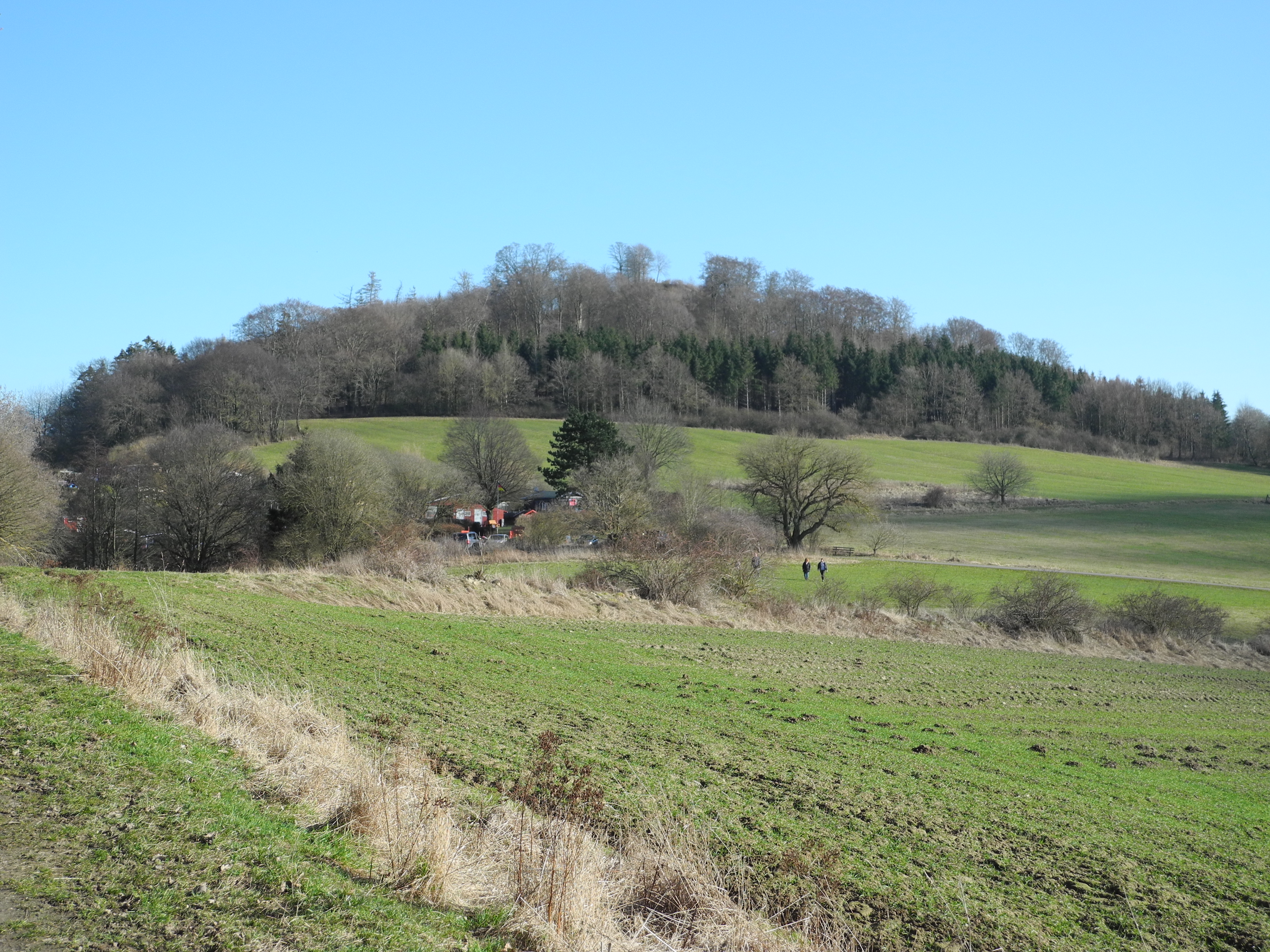

Highest point
- Elevation: 499.9 m (1,640 ft)
- Listing: Mountains and hills of Hesse
- Coordinates: 51°17′03″N 9°20′0″E

Geography
- Location within Hesse
- Location: Hesse, Germany

The Burgberg (German pronunciation: [ˈbʊʁkˌbɛʁk]) is a hill in Hesse, Germany. It is situated in the municipality of Schauenburg.
