= 1935 Amsterdam Fokker F.XXII crash =

1935 aviation accident

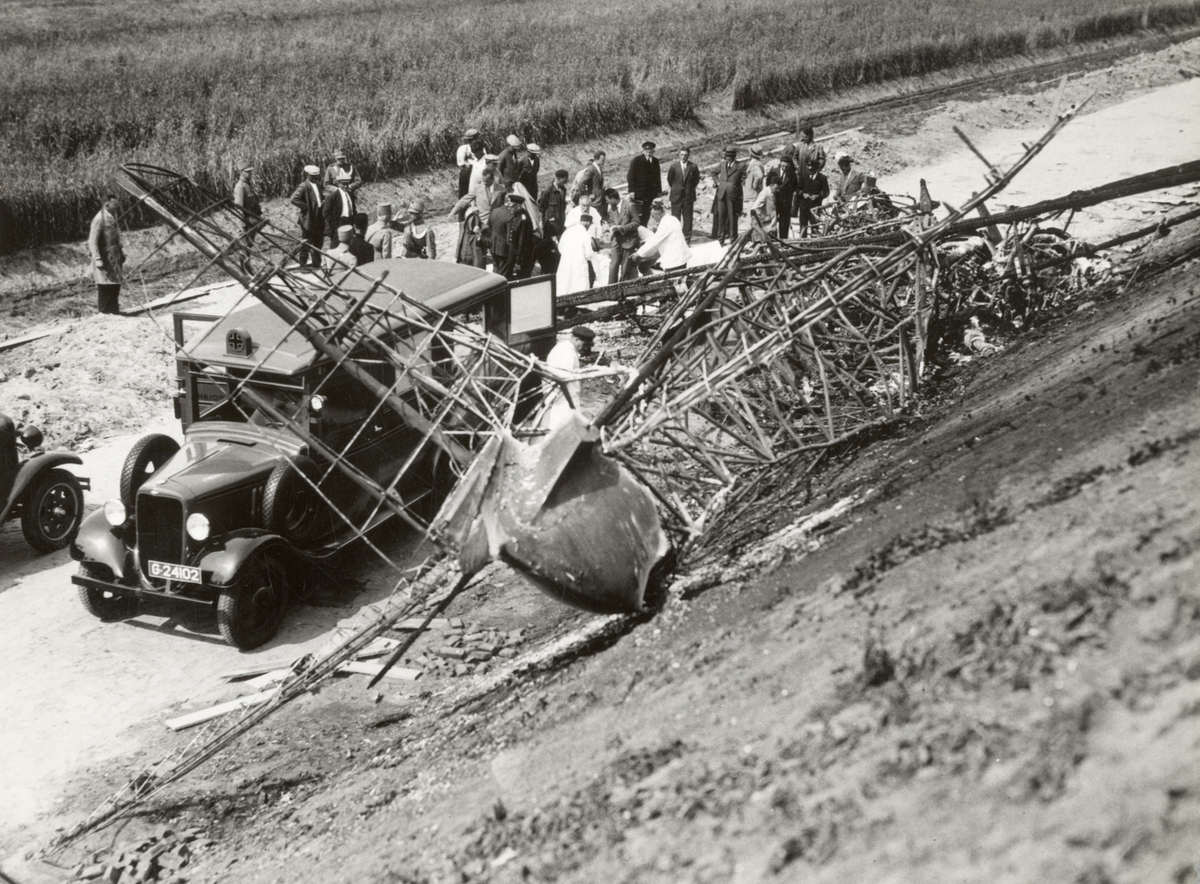
- Wreck of the Fokker F.XXII

Accident
- Date: 14 July 1935
- Summary: Double engine failure
- Site: near Schiphol Airport

Aircraft
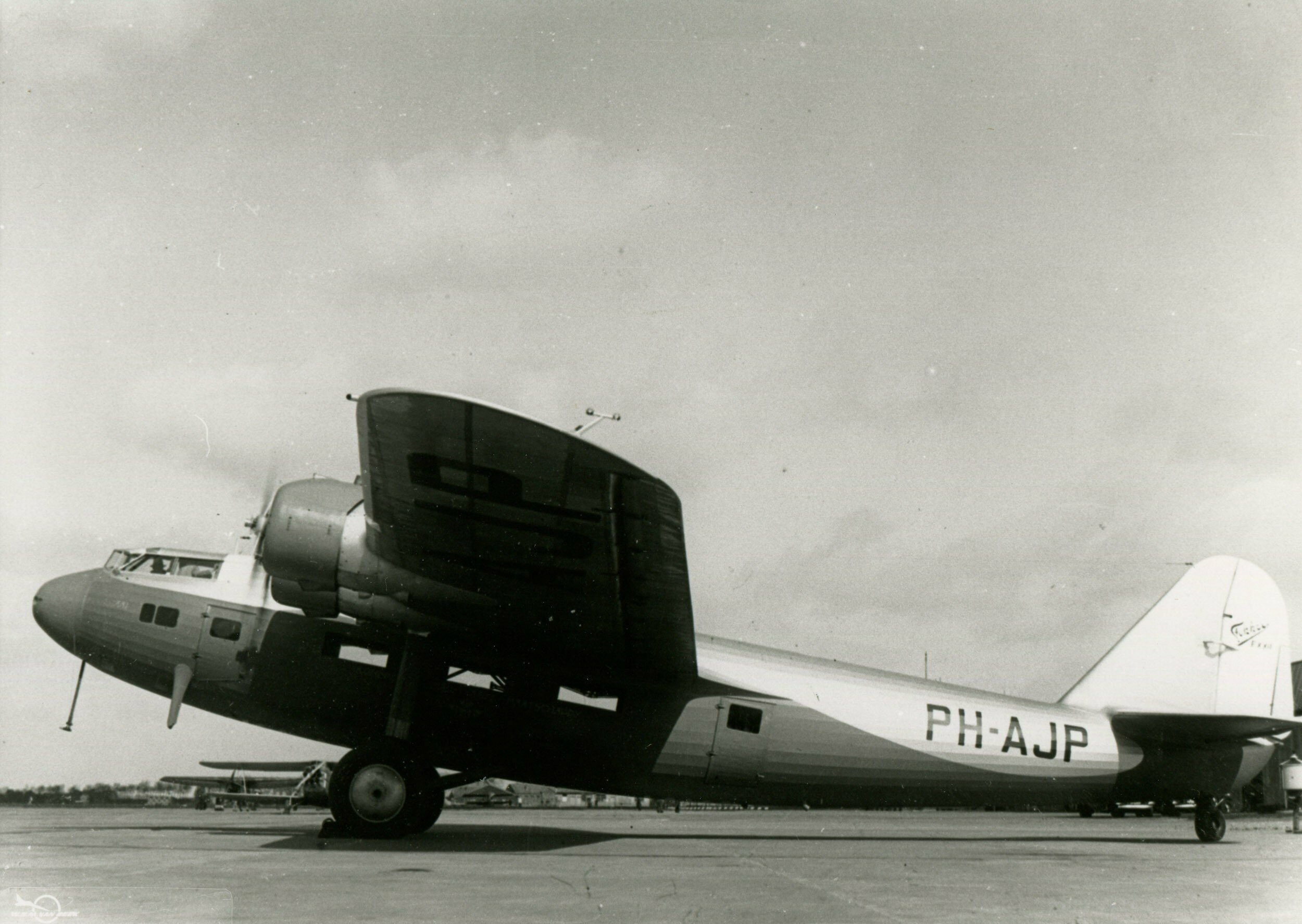
- A Fokker F.XXII similar to the accident aircraft
- Aircraft type: Fokker F.XXII
- Aircraft name: Kwikstaart
- Operator: KLM
- Registration: PH-AJQ
- Flight origin: Schiphol Airport, the Netherlands
- Stopover: Hamburg, Germany
- 2nd stopover: Copenhagen, Denmark
- Destination: Malmö, Sweden
- Passengers: 15
- Crew: 5
- Fatalities: 6
- Injuries: 5
- Survivors: 14

On 14 July 1935, Fokker F.XXII PH-AJQ Kwikstaart was an international passenger flight from Amsterdam via Hamburg and Copenhagen to Malmö. The plane crashed and burned shortly after take-off just outside Schiphol after both left side engines failed due to a defect in the fuel system, killing four crew members and two passengers. Fourteen people survived.

Similar aircraft types were taken out of service due to the disaster and adjustments were implemented to prevent such a failure.

== Flight and crash ==
The Fokker F.XXII PH-AJQ (named: "Kwikstaart") operated by KLM departed on 14 July 1935 at 9:37am local time for a scheduled international flight from Amsterdam via Hamburg, Copenhagen to Malmö. On board were twenty people: 15 passengers and 5 crew members. There was also international mail on board, including British mail. Shortly after take-off the left outer engine dropped in revolutions per minute and shortly afterwards also the left inner engine. Within a minute after take off both engines stopped working. To make an emergency landing, the pilot flew over the dyke of the Amsterdam-The Hague highway, which was under construction. He made a flat left turn and flew low over a cornfield parallel to the embankment. During the second left turn the left wing dropped, and the plane turned around the top axis. The left wing touched the embankment of the highway and broke. The airplane crashed at the other side of the embankment at 9:40am local time, three minutes after taking off.

The door of the cabin opened during the crash. The first person who jumped out of the plane was the flight attendant followed by some passengers. A group of cyclists, who saw the crash happen, helped with rescuing people out of the plane. The door of the cockpit was stuck. According to the cyclist, the crew in the cockpit banged on the windows to escape. Shortly after the crash the left wing caught fire and shortly after the whole plane burned. The remaining people on board were killed. Of the twenty people on board, six people died and five were injured.

== Victims ==
Six people died in the crash. Four crew members and two British passengers.

- The 31-year-old pilot German-born Heinz Silberstein. Silberstein was one of the most experienced KLM pilots. After four years flying with Lufthansa, he was fired due to the required "Arier declaration". At the request of the Lufthansa management, KLM, who had a shortage of pilots, hired him. In the first two years at KLM he made 2200 flying hours where Silberstein made 2200 flying hours, including flying to the Dutch East Indies. Silberstein was married and had a 3-month-old child.
- The 30-year-old radio operator G.F. Nieboer. Nieboer was born in Veendam. Before joining KLM he worked for eleven years at Radio Holland, a company in radio communication particularly for maritime shipping. He started working for the KLM in 1934 and had only been employed for a year. Nieboer was married and had one child.
- The 30-year-old flight engineer L.J. van Dijk. After working as 2nd stoker in the Navy, he started working at KLM in 1928. He became a qualified mechanic for the Douglas airplanes. As a mechanic for the Fokker F.XXII he already made three flights under supervision. After this flight, he would have become an independent engineer for the Fokker F.XXII. Van Dijk was married and had two children.
- The 30-year-old flight engineer G. Brom. After nine years working at KLM he became a 1st technician at the department of the Dutch East Indies. He was appointed as on-board mechanic on 15 May 1935. Brom was married and didn’t have children.
- Two British male passengers: W.E. Newman and H.C. Hodson.

Most of the people who survived the crash were injured, five officially listed as injured. Three of the most severe injured passengers were hospitalized out of danger at the Wilhelmina Gasthuis. After her husband left the hospital, Swedish Mrs. Carlstadt left the hospital on 3 August. On 20 September 1935, over two months after the crash, the last person was examined from the hospital.

== Reactions and aftermath ==
Many people expressed their condolences, including Queen Wilhelmina of the Netherlands, Princess Juliana of the Netherlands, Governor of the Netherlands Antilles Bartholomeus van Slobbe and the Dutch minister of water management Otto van Lidth de Jeude.

=== Wreck ===
In the evening of 14 July 1935, the wreck of the plane was released. The intention was to destroy the remains of the aircraft in the smelter of KLM's technical service. Due to a misunderstanding, the wreck was sold to a scrapper from Sloten. The scraper started exhibiting the wreckage for an entrance fee of 10 cents and parts of the wreck were sold as souvenirs. To put an end to this, the KLM bought back the wreck on 17 July.

=== Film ===
During the crash a crew of “Filmfabriek Holland” was in a car in the neighborhood and saw the crash happening. They went to the crash site where they started filming two minutes after the crash. It became as described a film of “very sad images”. The film was first shown in movie theater “New York” in Hilversum in days after the disaster and later also in other cinemas. It was advertised in newspapers. Multiple movie companies, including Paramount and Remaco, bought the film and it was shown at international cinemas.

=== Funeral ===
The four crew members were buried in a communal grave at the Zorgvlied cemetery in Amsterdam. There was a huge crowd in Amsterdam along the route of the funeral procession. There were a large number of people at the graveyard and a huge number of flowers were sent also from outside the Netherlands. During the ceremony, Mr. Plesman and alderman Ter Haar spoke.

=== Effect on other airplanes ===
Several aircraft were taken out of service due to the disaster. The F.36 “Arend” returned after 1.5 month in late August.

== Investigation ==
It was determined that the fuel supply of both left engines didn't work properly and as a result the engines provided much less power to give the required speed and height during take-off. This also explains the left-wing drift before the crash. A similar case where an engine stalled due to insufficient fuel supply had occurred on 25 and fuel had to be pumped manually. After 25 April it was decided to start this type of aircraft with the fuel tap in the hand pump position. The investigation showed that the fuel taps in the wreckage were not in the manual pumping position, so it was concluded that during the flight the taps were adjusted and therefore no manual pressure could be applied.

Partly due to this crash, in November 1935 the fuel supply was a main topic at the congress of the International Air Traffic Association.

=== Conclusions ===
According to the final report, the crash happened because of reduced fuel supply, which can make it necessary to refuel manually at the start. While under very adverse conditions, it can still happen that the pressure is insufficient. The fact that the position of the cranes where changed is said to be a possible contribution to the accident.

=== Measures ===
More powerful pumps were installed in this type of aircraft. Due to the accident, KLM made an adjustment that no taps needed to be adjusted to use the hand pump.
