= Douglas DC-5 =

Twin-engine propeller aircraft intended for shorter routes

DC-5/C-110/R3D
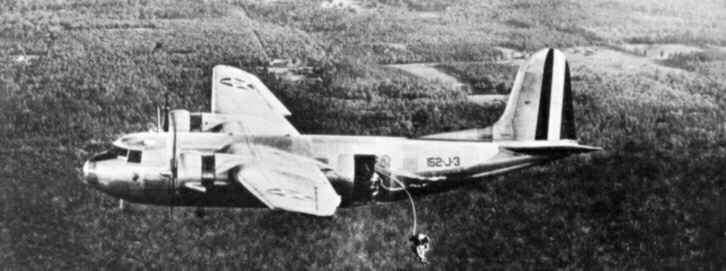
- US Navy Douglas R3D-2

General information
- Type: Transport
- Manufacturer: Douglas Aircraft Company
- Designer: Donald Douglas
- Status: Retired
- Primary users: KNILM KLM; United States Navy; United States Marine Corps
- Number built: 12

History
- Introduction date: 1940
- First flight: 20 February 1939
- Retired: 1949

The Douglas DC-5 (Douglas Commercial Model 5) was a 16-to-22-seat, twin-engine propeller aircraft intended for shorter routes than the Douglas DC-3 or Douglas DC-4. By the time it entered commercial service in 1940, many airlines were canceling orders for aircraft. Consequently, only five civilian DC-5s were built. With the Douglas Aircraft Company already converting to World War II military production, the DC-5 was soon overtaken by world events, although a limited number of military variants were produced.

== Design and development ==
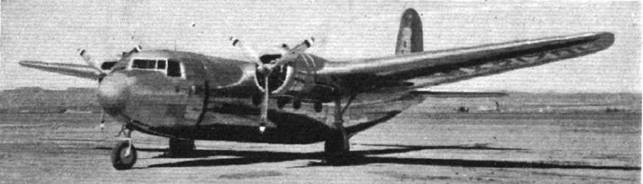
A Douglas DC-5, circa 1939

The DC-5 was developed in 1938 as a 16-22 seat civilian airliner, designed to use either Pratt & Whitney R-1690 Hornet or Wright R-1820 Cyclone radial engines. It was the first airliner to combine shoulder wings and tricycle landing gear, a configuration that is still common in turboprop airliners and military transport aircraft, although the modern versions are actually high wing, as the structure sits atop the fuselage shell rather than intersecting a significant segment. The tricycle landing gear was innovative for transport airplanes. It provided better ground handling and better ground visibility for the pilots.

The fuselage was about two feet above the ground, so loading of passengers and cargo was easier than aircraft with the then-standard conventional landing gear. A very early design change was the addition of a 15-degree dihedral to the horizontal tail group to negate a hint of an Aeroelasticity problem. The dorsal strake, introduced in minimal form and expanded to full growth on the Boeing 307, is also well developed on the DC-5. Another significant modification was adding exhaust stacks to the engine nacelles, which was retroactively incorporated after the series entered production. An unusual optical trick was applied to the prototype. The top of the Vertical stabilizer and the outline of the engine nacelles were painted a darker color following the aircraft's contour, making the tail and engines appear somewhat smaller and the aircraft sleeker.

Prior to US entry into World War II, one prototype and four production aircraft were built.

== Operational history ==
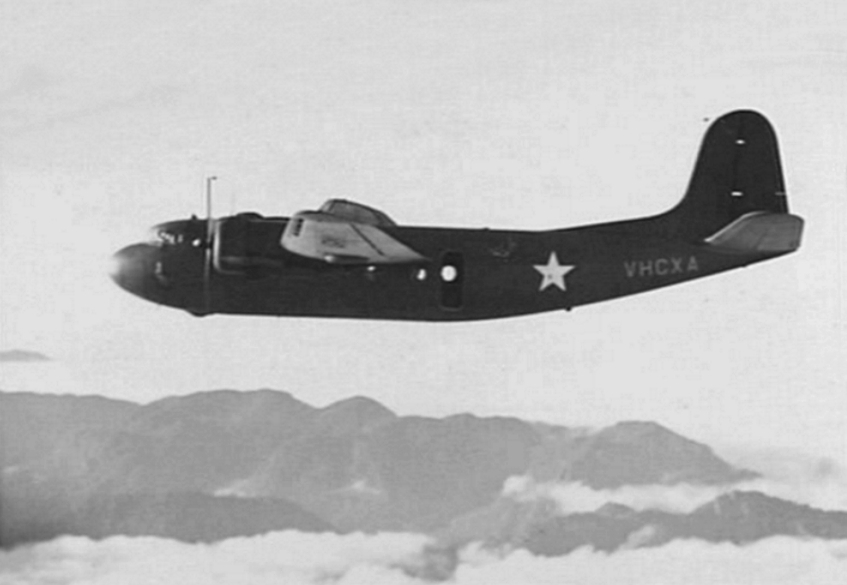
US DC-5 transport aircraft carrying supplies from the Australian mainland to Allied troops in Port Moresby, New Guinea, August 1942

The prototype DC-5, Douglas serial 411, was built at El Segundo, California, with 1,000 hp Wright R-1820-44 Cyclone engines. The aircraft made its first flight on February 20, 1939, with Carl Cover at the controls. This sole prototype (configured with just eight seats) became the personal aircraft of William Boeing, who named it Rover. It was later impressed into the US Navy and converted for military use as an R3D-3 variant in February 1942.

The first customer for the type was KLM, who ordered four planes. Pennsylvania Central (later renamed Capital Airlines) ordered six and SCADTA (Sociedad Colombo-Alemana de Transportes Aéreos), ancestor of Avianca, ordered two. When Douglas factories went into war production, DC-5 production was curtailed to build additional SBD Dauntless dive bombers for the United States Navy (USN) and United States Marine Corps (USMC) and so only KLM received the high-winged airliner.

A dozen DC-5s were completed, of which four went into commercial service with KLM. The first two initially were put to use by the KLM West-Indisch Bedrijf and flew between Paramaribo in Surinam (now Suriname) and Curaçao in the Dutch colonial territory of the same name. The other two were sold to the Netherlands-Indies Government for use by KNILM (with no affiliations with KLM, despite having their head offices in Amsterdam) from Batavia (now Jakarta, Indonesia) from 1940 onwards. The first pair were later also transferred to KNILM. Of these four aircraft, three were used for the 1942 evacuation of civilians from Java to Australia; the fourth was damaged in an air strike by the Imperial Japanese Army Air Force at Batavia Kemajoran Airport on February 9, 1942, and abandoned. Japanese forces captured and subsequently repaired it for testing in Japan during 1943. This DC-5, painted in camouflage with Japanese Imperial Army Air Force markings, was later used as a transport in the Japanese Home Islands.

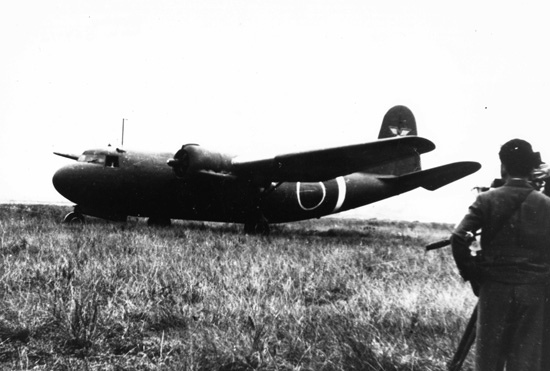
The captured ex-KNILM DC-5 in service with the Japanese Imperial Army Air Force

The three remaining aircraft made their way safely to Australia where they were sold to the United States Army Air Forces (USAAF) and operated for the Allied Directorate of Air Transport (ADAT). Two were destroyed by the end of 1942, the other was transferred to Australian National Airways (ANA), which operated it throughout the war on behalf of ADAT. In 1944 the USAAF retroactively designated the three aircraft C-110 for administrative purposes.

In 1939, the USN ordered seven aircraft. Three were delivered as R3D-1s, the first of which crashed before delivery. The remaining four were R3D-2s for the USMC and were equipped with 1,015 hp R-1820-44 engines, a large cargo hold, and 22 seats for paratroopers.

After World War II, production of the DC-5 was not resumed because of the abundance of surplus C-47 aircraft, converted for civil service as DC-3s. In 1948, the last surviving DC-5 was sold by Australian National Airways to another Australian airline, which smuggled it to Israel for military use. The aircraft arrived at Haifa in May 1948, and from there it went to Sde Dov, where its markings were removed and the name "Yankee Pasha – The Bagel Lancer" was crudely painted on the nose by hand. The aircraft joined 103 Squadron at Ramat David Airbase. Because Israel was in the midst of the 1948 Arab–Israeli War, it was occasionally used as a bomber as well as flying transport missions. On bomber missions the aft loading door was removed and bombs were rolled out of the opening "by a judicious shove from a crewman's foot." The operational record of the aircraft is in dispute as authoritative sources do not verify its combat service.

When the war ended and 103 Squadron moved, the DC-5 was left behind at Ramat David. It eventually found its way to a technical school where it was used extensively as a ground instruction airframe at Haifa Airport. When it was no longer serviceable due to a lack of spares, the airframe was stripped of its engines and instruments and the last DC-5 was reduced to scrap in Israel sometime after 1955.

== Variants ==
Prototype DC-5
The prototype was sold to William E. Boeing as a personal aircraft, modified to fit 16 passenger seats.
DC-5
The basic passenger version: five aircraft were built, one prototype and four production aircraft.
C-110
Retroactive designation for three former Indonesian-registered KNILM aircraft that had been bought by the United States Army Air Forces for service in Australia on behalf of the Allied Directorate of Air Transport in March 1942.
R3D-1
Military version of the DC-5 built for the United States Navy as 16-seat personnel carriers. Three were produced. One crashed at Mines Field, June 1, 1940. Another was retired in January 1946. The third is believed to have been used briefly by General Douglas MacArthur; retired January 1945.
R3D-2
Military version of the DC-5 built for the United States Marine Corps as 22-seat paratrooper version, four were produced.
R3D-3
The prototype, registered NC21701, sold to the military in 1942. Withdrawn from use June 30, 1946, in the U.S. Navy Aeronautical Laboratory, Banana River, Florida.

== Operators ==
=== Military operators ===
Australia

- Royal Australian Air Force
  - No. 21 Squadron RAAF

Israel

- Israeli Air Force operated one DC-5.

Japan

- Imperial Japanese Army Air Force operated one captured Dutch DC-5.

United States

- United States Army Air Forces three impressed in Australia in 1942 and designated C-110
- United States Navy operated two R3D-1s, a further aircraft crashed before delivery. In 1942 the prototype was bought.
- United States Marine Corps operated four R3D-2s.

=== Civil operators ===
Australia

- Australian National Airways
- New Holland Airways

Dutch West Indies

- KLM West Indies two aircraft delivered new in April and May 1940, from 1941 operated by KNILM, still owned by KLM.

Dutch East Indies

- KNILM two aircraft delivered to KLM in June/July 1940, sold to the Netherlands East Indies Government and leased to KNILM, two further aircraft transferred from KLM West Indies in 1941. Three escaped to Australia in February 1942 and one damaged in a Japanese air raid in February 1942 was repaired and used by the Japanese Army.

United States

- William E. Boeing operated one DC-5 delivered in 1940, sold to United States Navy in 1942.

=== Known airframes ===
Aircraft and histories
Construction number	Civilian registration	Initial service date	Military service registration	last noted	Remarks
424	PH-AXA				Reservation for KLM as PH-AXA "Alk" (reservation not taken up due to getting sent to Netherlands Antilles)
424	as PJ-AIW	May 1940			Went to Curaçao for KLM West Indisch bedrijf as PJ-AIW "Wakago". Went to Netherlands Indies via USA briefly after war broke out.
424	as PK-ADC	August 1941			Camouflage colour scheme. Was flown to Australia in February 1942 because of the Japanese threat.
424	VH-CXB	April 1942	USAAF unk		Used for charter work by Allied Directorate of Air Transport (ADAT)
424		June 1944	retro-serialled 44-83231	1946	registered and assigned type designator C-110. Used by USAAF 21 squadron in USAAF colours and markings. Scrapped in 1946 at Essendon
426	PH-AXB				Reservation for KLM as PH-AXB "Boschduif", but this airframe was used for static destructive testing for modifications demanded by the Netherlands airworthiness agency. Douglas replaced it with a new c/n 426
426	PH-AXG				Reservation for KLM as PH-AXG "Grutto" (reservation not taken up due to getting sent to Netherlands Antilles)
426	PJ-AIZ	30 May 1940			Went to Curaçao for KLM West Indisch bedrijf as PJ-AIZ "Zonvogel". Went to Netherlands Indies via USA briefly after war broke out.
426	PK-ADD	August 1941			Camouflage colour scheme. Was flown to Australia in February 1942 because of the Japanese threat.
426	41-426/VH-CXC	April 1942			Used for charter work by Allied Directorate of Air Transport (ADAT)
426		June 1944	retro-serialled 44-83232		registered and assigned type designator C-110. Used by USAAF 21 squadron in USAAF colours and markings
426	VH-ARD	July 1946			Sold to Australian National Airways and later to Gregory Richmond Board in Sydney, yet later to New Holland Airways as 'Bali Clipper'.
426	1501	1948		1962	Sold via Italy to Israeli Air Force; received IAF serial 1501, Went to Israëli AF Technical School in Haifa. Supposedly scrapped in mid-1960s.
428	PH-AXB				Reservation for KLM as PH-AXB "Boschduif"
428	PK-ADB/D-904	May 1940			went to KNILM in Netherlands-Indies.
428					Camouflage colour scheme. Was flown to Australia in February 1942 because of the Japanese threat.
428	41-428/VH-CXA	April 1942			Used for charter work by Allied Directorate of Air Transport (ADAT). Supposedly damaged during Japanese attack on Port Moresby (PNG) August 1942 others say a Parafield (South Aus) end of 1942.
428		June 1944	retro-serialled 44-83230		registered and assigned type designator C-110, even though it had been written off 18 months earlier.
430	PH-AXE				Reservation for KLM as PH-AXE "Eend"
430	PK-ADA/D-905				went to KNILM in Netherlands-Indies.
430		March 1942			Captured by Japanese troops, repaired and flown to Tokio for testing.
430				1945	scrapped

== Specifications (DC-5) ==
Data from Jane's all the World's Aircraft 1939, McDonnell Douglas aircraft since 1920 : Volume I

General characteristics

- Crew: 3
- Capacity: 16-24 passengers
- Length: 62 ft 2 in (18.95 m)
- Wingspan: 78 ft (24 m)
- Height: 19 ft 10 in (6.05 m)
- Wing area: 824 sq ft (76.6 m^{2})
- Airfoil: root: NACA 23018; tip: NACA 23012
- Empty weight: 13,674 lb (6,202 kg)
- Gross weight: 20,000 lb (9,072 kg)
- Fuel capacity: ~550 US gal (460 imp gal; 2,100 L) ; 34 US gal (28 imp gal; 130 L) oil in two nacelle tanks
- Powerplant: 2 × Wright GR-1820-G102A Cyclone 9-cylinder air-cooled radial piston engine, 900 hp (670 kW) each at 2,300 rpm and 6,700 ft (2,000 m)
- Propellers: 3-bladed Hamilton-Standard Hydromatic fully-feathering variable-pitch propellers

Performance

- Maximum speed: 230 mph (370 km/h, 200 kn) at 7,700 ft (2,300 m)
- Cruise speed: 195 mph (314 km/h, 169 kn) 65% power at 10,000 ft (3,000 m)
- Range: 1,600 mi (2,600 km, 1,400 nmi) maximum
- Service ceiling: 23,700 ft (7,200 m)
- Absolute ceiling on one engine: 11,400 ft (3,500 m)
- Rate of climb: 1,585 ft/min (8.05 m/s)
- Wing loading: 24.3 lb/sq ft (119 kg/m^{2})
- Power/mass: 0.11 hp/lb (0.18 kW/kg)

== See also ==
Related development

- Douglas A-20 Havoc

Aircraft of comparable role, configuration, and era

- de Havilland Flamingo

Related lists

- List of aircraft of World War II
- List of civil aircraft
- List of military aircraft of the United States
- List of United States Navy aircraft designations (pre-1962)

== Bibliography ==
- Delta, Mike (July 1993). "Forgotten Five: The history of the very limited production of the Douglas DC-5 Airliner". Air Classics. Vol. 29, no. 7. ISSN 0002-2241.
- Francillon, René J (1979). McDonnell Douglas Aircraft since 1920. London: Putnam. ISBN 0-370-00050-1.
- Hardy, Mike (April 1996). "Douglas Uncommercial". Aeroplane Monthly. Vol. 24, no. 4. pp. 14–19. ISSN 0143-7240.
- Jupnter, Joseph P (1994). U.S. Civil Aircraft Series, Vol 8. Blue Ridge Summit, PA: TAB Books. ISBN 0-8306-4373-7.
- Ledet, Michel (April 2002). "Des avions alliés aux couleurs japonais" [Allied Aircraft in Japanese Colors]. Avions: Toute l'Aéronautique et son histoire (in French). No. 109. pp. 17–21. ISSN 1243-8650.
- Ledet, Michel (May 2002). "Des avions alliés aux couleurs japonais". Avions: Toute l'Aéronautique et son histoire (in French). No. 110. pp. 16–23. ISSN 1243-8650.
- Norton, Bill (2004). On The Edge: A History of the Israeli Air Force and its Aircraft since 1947. Hinckley, UK: Midland Counties Publications. ISBN 1-85780-088-5.
- Pearcy, Arthur (1995). Douglas Propliners: DC-1 – DC-7. London: Airlife. ISBN 1-85310-261-X.
