= Fokker S.II =

Dutch trainer aircraft

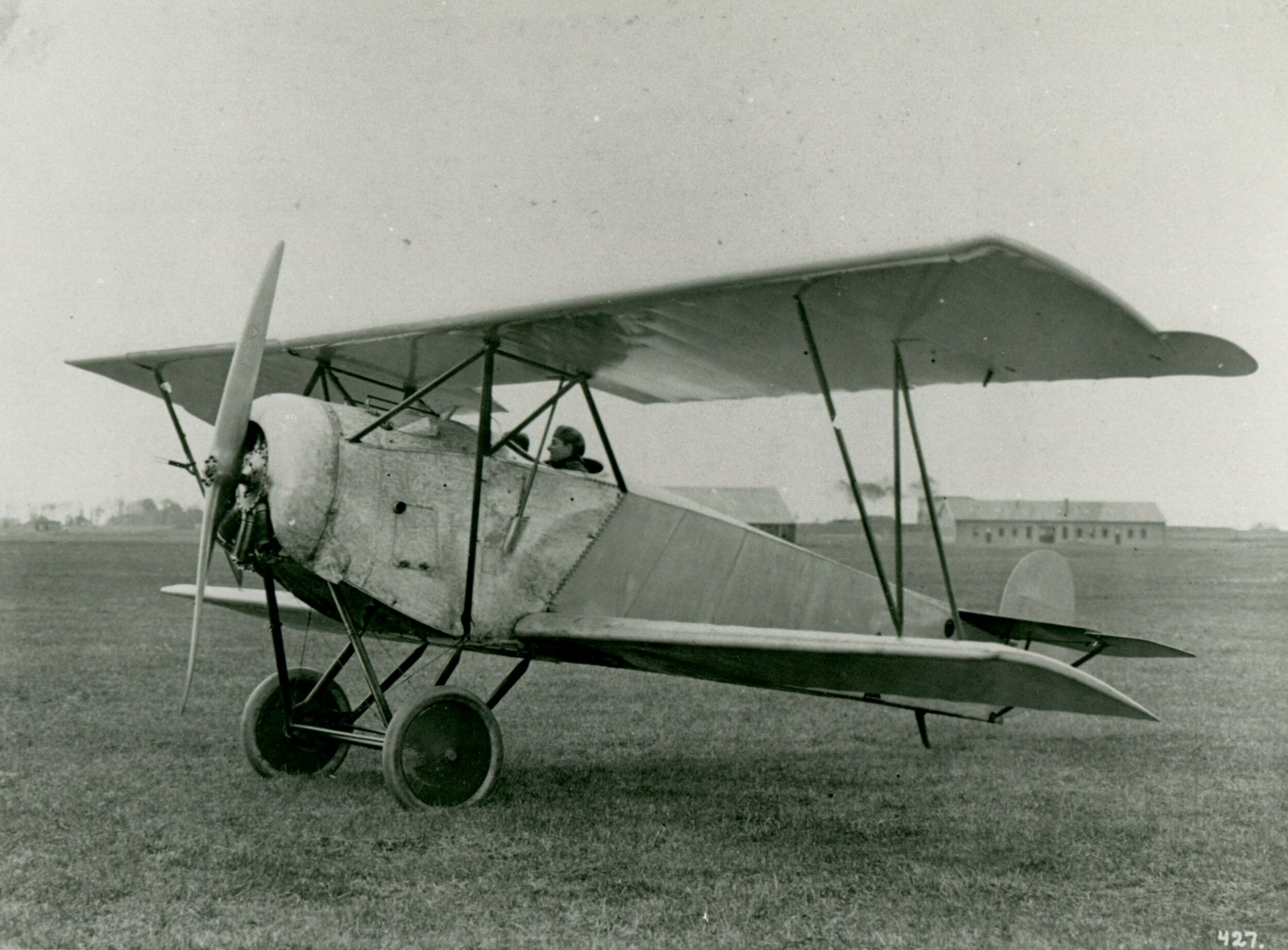
- Fokker S.II

General information
- Type: Primary trainer
- Manufacturer: Fokker
- Designer: Reinhold Platz
- Primary user: Royal Netherlands Army Aviation Group
- Number built: 15+

History
- First flight: 1922

The Fokker S.II was a 1920s Dutch primary trainer built by the Fokker company for service with the Dutch Army.

== Development ==
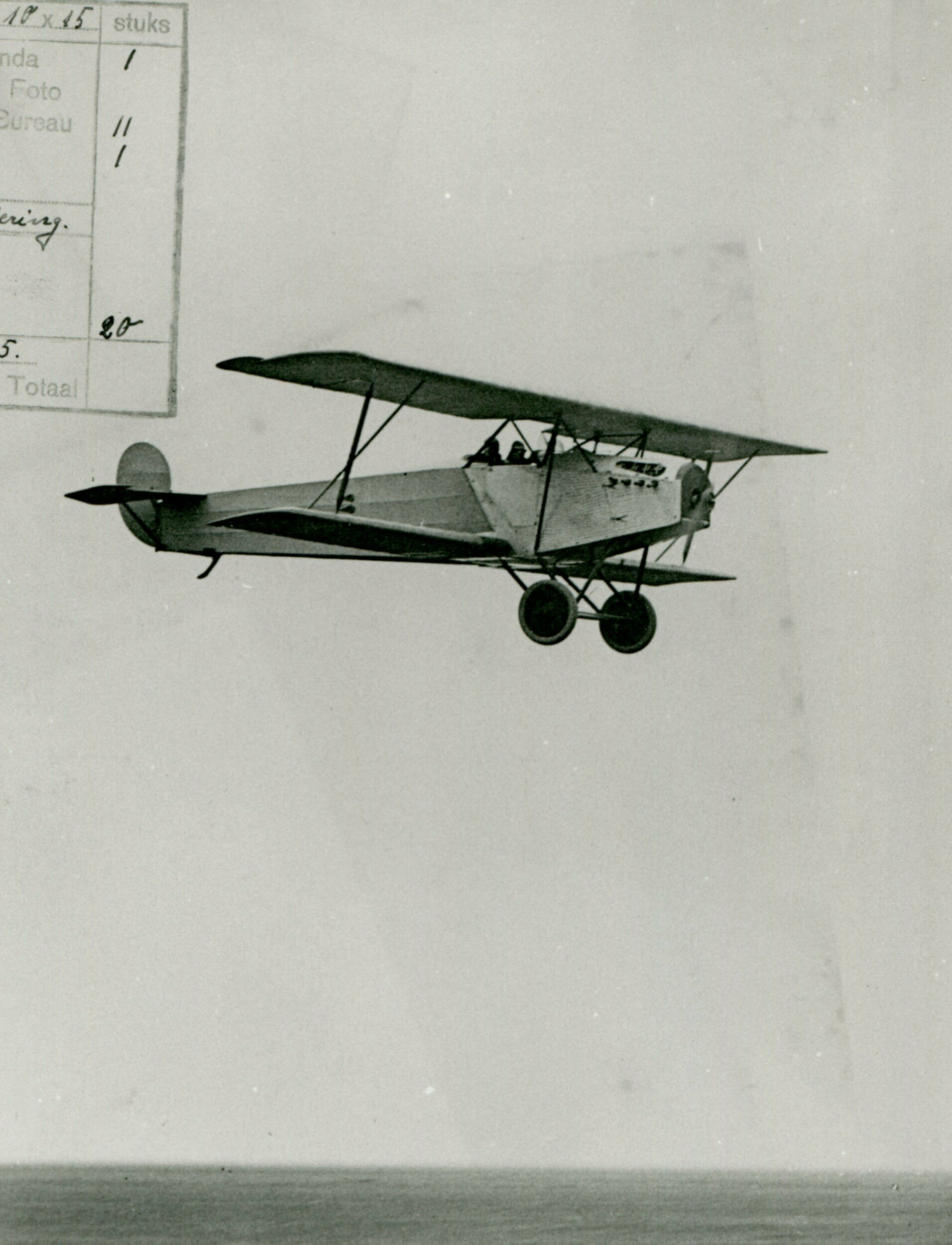
S.II demonstrator with Curtiss OX-5 engine as offered to the USAAS.

The S.II was designed by Reinhold Platz as the second Fokker primary trainer, but unlike the earlier S.I monoplane the S.II was an unequal-span single-bay biplane with a fixed cross-axle landing gear. It had side-by-side seating for an instructor and pupil and was originally powered by an 82 kW (110 hp) Thulin rotary engine. The engine was later replaced with a Le Rhone-Oberursel engine.

The aircraft was ordered by the LVA (Dutch Army Aviation) who purchased 15. One aircraft was modified to use a Curtiss OX-5 engine to elicit a response from the United States Army Air Service but they were not interested and the aircraft was returned to standard configuration.

== Operation history ==
The 15 aircraft served with the Dutch Army until 1932 but one of the aircraft were converted to an Ambulance configuration and designated the S.IIA. It was still in service when German forces invaded the Netherlands in 1940. The S.IIA gained national notability in December 1933, when it was used for a mercy flight to carry two sick children and a young woman to hospital.

== Variants ==
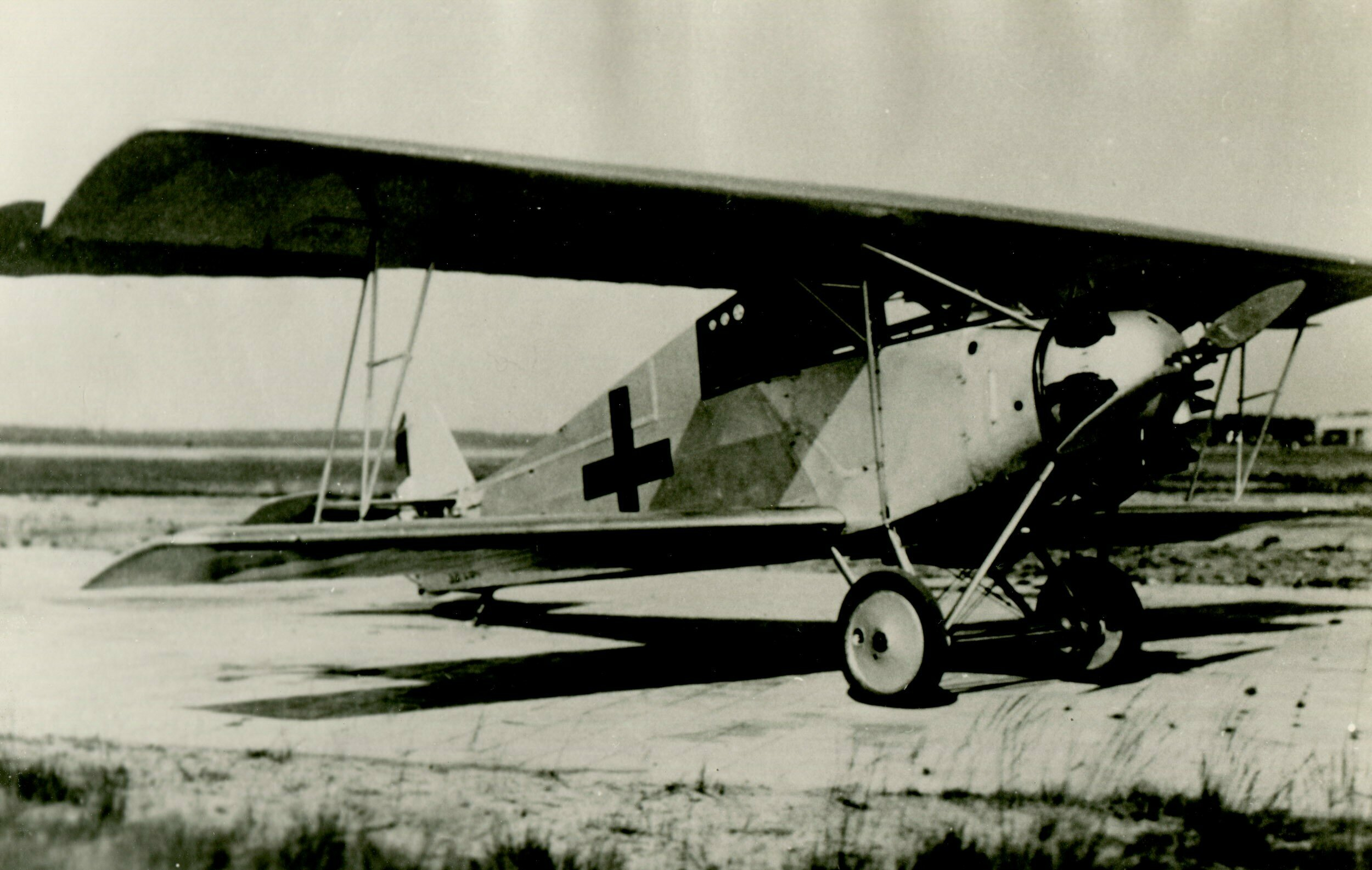
The Fokker S.IIA ambulance aircraft

S.II
Production version, 15 built.
S.IIA
One S.II modified to carry stretchers as an ambulance aircraft.

== Operators ==
Netherlands

- Dutch Army Aviation

Soviet Union

- Soviet Air Force - Two aircraft.

== Specifications (S.II) ==
General characteristics

- Crew: 2
- Powerplant: 1 × Rhône-Oberursel 9-cyl. air-cooled rotary piston engine, 67 kW (90 hp)

Performance
