= Fokker PW-5 =

PW-5
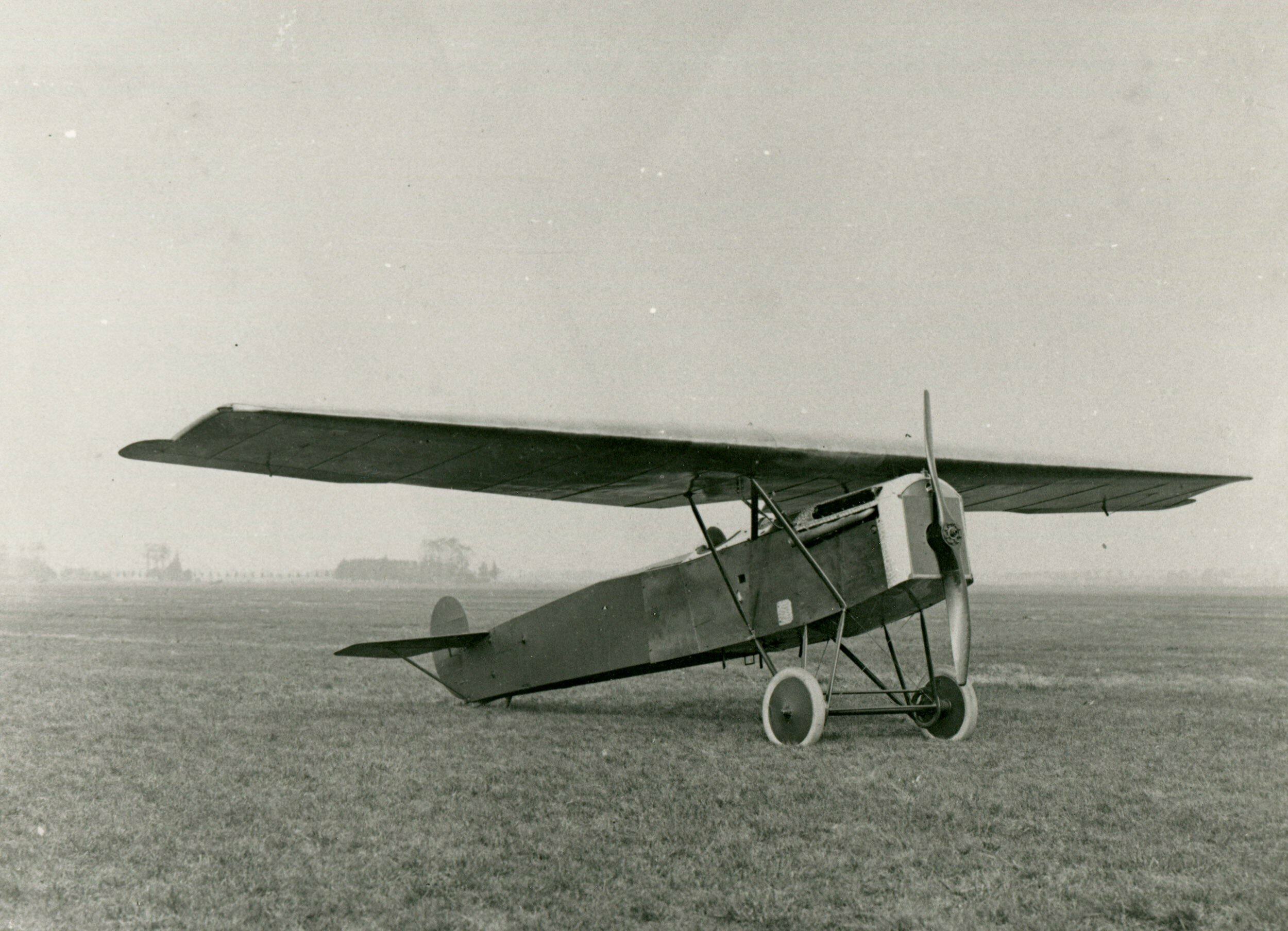

General information
- Type: Fighter aircraft
- National origin: Netherlands
- Manufacturer: Fokker
- Primary user: US Army Air Service
- Number built: 12

History
- Introduction date: 1922
- First flight: 1921
- Developed from: Fokker D.VIII

The Fokker PW-5 (designated Fokker F VI by Fokker) was a Dutch fighter aircraft of the 1920s. It was a parasol monoplane of which twelve were built for the US Army Air Service, being used as advanced trainers.

== Design and development ==
In 1921, the US Army Air Service evaluated the Fokker D.VIII parasol monoplane, and the D.VII biplane, both fighters handed over to it after the Armistice with Germany that ended World War I. It placed an order for two examples of a parasol monoplane fighter based on the design of the D.VIII, but powered by an American-built Hispano-Suiza V-8 engine, for evaluation. These aircraft, designated by Fokker as Fokker F VI, (Note: Some sources also give the designation V.40 to these aircraft but Weyl states that the designation V.40 refers to an entirely different, and much smaller, light civil aircraft.) had plywood-covered wooden cantilever wings similar to those in the D.VIII and the contemporary D.X fighters, and a typical Fokker welded steel-tube fuselage. The forward fuselage was protected by armour plates, although the car-type radiator and the wing-mounted fuel tank had no such protection. The aircraft had a fixed tailskid undercarriage, while it had no fixed fin, having a balanced rudder instead.

== Operational history ==
In 1921, the two evaluation examples were delivered in 1921, although one of them crashed on 13 March 1922 when its wing failed owing to flutter. An order for a further 10 aircraft was placed, and delivered later in 1921, the aircraft being used as advanced trainers by the 1st Pursuit Group.

== Operators ==
United States

- US Army Air Service
  - 1st Pursuit Group.

== Specifications (PW-5) ==
Data from The Complete Book of Fighters

General characteristics

- Crew: 1
- Length: 26 ft 1 in (7.95 m)
- Wingspan: 39 ft 5 in (12.01 m)
- Height: 9 ft 0 in (2.74 m)
- Wing area: 247 sq ft (22.9 m^{2})
- Empty weight: 1,935 lb (878 kg)
- Gross weight: 2,686 lb (1,218 kg)
- Powerplant: 1 × Wright-Hispano water-cooled V-8 engine, 300 hp (220 kW)

Performance

- Maximum speed: 144 mph (232 km/h, 125 kn) at sea level
- Endurance: 2 hours
- Rate of climb: 1,585 ft/min (8.05 m/s)

Armament

- Guns: 2×.30 in (7.62 mm) machine guns
- Bombs: provision for small bombs on rack under fuselage

== See also ==
Related development

- Fokker D.VIII
- Fokker D.X
