= Fokker =

1912–1996 Dutch aircraft manufacturer

- Logo of Fokker company.
- Industry: Aerospace
- Founded: 22 February 1912
- Founder: Anthony Fokker
- Defunct: 1996
- Fate: Bankruptcy
- Headquarters: Berlin, Germany (former); Schwerin, Germany (former); Amsterdam, Netherlands
- Key people: Anthony Fokker, Reinhold Platz, Walter Rethel
- Products: Commercial airliners Military aircraft

Fokker (N.V. Koninklijke Nederlandse Vliegtuigenfabriek Fokker; lit. 'Royal Dutch Aircraft Factory Fokker') was a Dutch aircraft manufacturer that operated from 1912 to 1996. The company was founded by the Dutch aviator Anthony Fokker and became famous during World War I for its fighter aircraft. During its most successful period in the 1920s and 1930s, Fokker dominated the civil aviation market. The company's fortunes declined over the course of the late 20th century; it declared bankruptcy in 1996, and its operations were sold to competitors.

== History ==
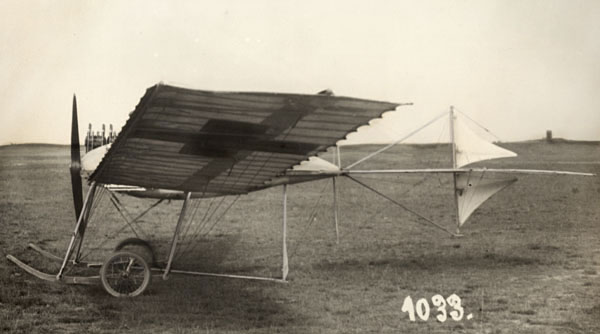
Fokker's first airplane, the Spin (Spider) (1910)

=== Fokker in Germany ===
At age 20, while studying in Germany, Anthony Fokker built his initial aircraft, the Spin (Spider)—the first Dutch-built plane to fly in his home country. Taking advantage of better opportunities in Germany, he moved to Berlin, where in 1912, he founded his first company, Fokker Aeroplanbau, later moving to the Görries suburb just southwest of Schwerin (at 53°36′45.90″N 11°22′31.60″E), where the current company was founded, as Fokker Aviatik GmbH, on 12 February 1912.

=== World War I ===
Fokker capitalized on having sold several Fokker Spin monoplanes to the German government and set up a factory in Germany to supply the German Army in World War I. His first new design for the Germans to be produced in any numbers was the Fokker M.5, which was little more than a copy of the Morane-Saulnier G, built with steel tube instead of wood for the fuselage, and with minor alterations to the outline of the rudder and undercarriage and a new aerofoil section. When it was realized that arming these scouts with a machine gun firing through the arc of the propeller was desirable, Fokker developed a synchronization gear similar to that patented by Franz Schneider.

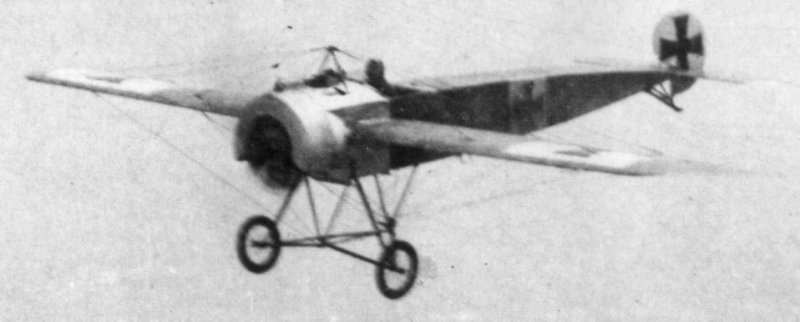
Fokker Eindecker in flight

Fitted with a developed version of this gear, the M.5 became the Fokker Eindecker, which due to its revolutionary armament, became one of the most feared aircraft over the western front, its introduction leading to a period of German air superiority known as the Fokker Scourge which only ended with the introduction of new aircraft such as the Nieuport 11 and Airco DH.2.

During World War I, Fokker engineers worked on the Fokker-Leimberger, an externally powered 12-barrel Rotary gun chambered in 7.92×57mm Mauser. It was reportedly capable of firing over 7200 rounds per minute.

Later in the war, after the Fokker D.V (the last design by earlier chief designer Martin Kreutzer), had failed to gain acceptance with the Luftstreitkräfte the German government forced Fokker (for their aircraft production expertise) and Junkers (for their pioneering all-metal airframe construction techniques, and advanced design concepts) to cooperate more closely, which resulted in the foundation of the Junkers-Fokker Aktiengesellschaft, or Jfa, on 20 October 1917. As this partnership proved to be troublesome, it was eventually dissolved. By then, former Fokker welder and new designer Reinhold Platz, who had taken the late Martin Kreutzer's place with the firm, had adapted some of Prof. Junkers' design concepts, that resulted in a visual similarity between the aircraft of those two manufacturers during the next decade.

Some of the noteworthy types produced by Fokker during the second half of the war, all designed primarily by Platz, included the Fokker D.VI biplane, Fokker Dr.I triplane or Dreidecker (remembered as a mount of the Red Baron), Fokker D.VII biplane (the only aircraft ever referred to directly in a treaty: all D.VII's were singled out for handover to the allies in their terms of the armistice agreement) and the Fokker D.VIII parasol monoplane.

=== Return to the Netherlands ===
In 1919, Fokker, owing large sums in back taxes (including 14,250,000 marks of income tax), returned to the Netherlands and founded a new company near Amsterdam with the support of the Steenkolen Handels Vereniging, now known as SHV Holdings. He chose the name Nederlandse Vliegtuigenfabriek (Dutch Aircraft Factory) to conceal the Fokker brand because of his involvement in World War I. Because of the strict disarmament conditions of the Treaty of Versailles, Fokker did not return home empty-handed. In 1919, he arranged an export permit and brought six entire trains of parts, and 180 types of aircraft across the Dutch-German border, among them 117 Fokker C.Is, D.VIIs, and D.VIIIs. This initial stock enabled him to set up shop quickly.

After his company's relocation, many Fokker C.I and C.IV military airplanes were delivered to Russia, Romania, and the still-clandestine German air force. Success came on the commercial market, too, with the development of the Fokker F.VII, a high-winged aircraft capable of taking on various types of engines. Fokker continued to design and build military aircraft, delivering planes to the Royal Netherlands Air Force. Foreign military customers eventually included Finland, Sweden, Denmark, Norway, Switzerland, Hungary, and Italy. These countries bought substantial numbers of the Fokker C.V reconnaissance aircraft, which became Fokker's main success in the late 1920s and early 1930s.

=== 1920s and 1930s ===
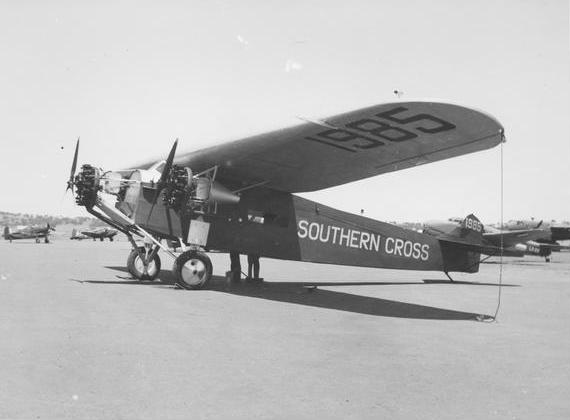
Fokker F.VII.

In the 1920s, Fokker entered its glory years, becoming the world's largest aircraft manufacturer by the late 1920s. Its greatest success was the 1925 F.VIIa/3m trimotor passenger aircraft, which was used by 54 airline companies worldwide and captured 40% of the American market in 1936. It shared the European market with the Junkers all-metal aircraft, but dominated the American market until the arrival of the Ford Trimotor which copied the aerodynamic features of the Fokker F.VII, and Junkers structural concepts.

In 1923, Anthony Fokker moved to the United States, where in 1927, he established an American branch of his company, the Atlantic Aircraft Corporation, which was renamed the Fokker Aircraft Corporation of America. In 1930, this company merged with General Motors Corporation and the company's name became General Aviation Manufacturing Corporation, which in turn merged with North American Aviation and was divested by GM in 1948. In 1931, discontented at being totally subordinate to GM management, Fokker resigned.

A serious blow to Fokker's reputation came after the 1931 crash of a Transcontinental & Western Air Fokker F-10 in Kansas, when it became known that the crash was caused by a structural failure caused by wood rot. Notre Dame legendary football coach Knute Rockne was among the fatalities, prompting extensive media coverage and technical investigation. As a result, all Fokkers were grounded in the US, along with many other types that had copied Fokker's wings.

In 1934 Nevil Shute of Airspeed Ltd (England) negotiated with Fokker himself for a manufacturing licensing agreement. In January 1935 Airspeed signed an agreement for the Douglas DC-2 and a number of Fokker types, with Fokker to be a consultant for seven years. Shute found him "genial, shrewd and helpful" but "already a sick man"; and he was difficult to deal with as "his domestic life was irregular". Airspeed considered making the Fokker D.XVII for Greece, as Greece wanted to buy from Britain for currency reasons, but the proposal did not "come off"; Shute recommended reading his novel Ruined City on Balkan methods of business. And after a year the drift to war meant that Dutchmen could not go to the Airspeed factory or to board meetings.

On December 23, 1939, Fokker died in New York City after a three-week illness.

=== World War II ===
At the outset of World War II, the few G.Is and D.XXIs of the Dutch Air Force were able to score a respectable number of victories against the Luftwaffe, but many were destroyed on the ground before they could be used.

The Fokker factories were confiscated by the Germans and were used to build Bücker Bü 181 Bestmann trainers and parts for the Junkers Ju 52 transport. At the end of the war, the factories were completely stripped by the Germans and destroyed by Allied bombing.

=== Post–World War II rebuilding ===
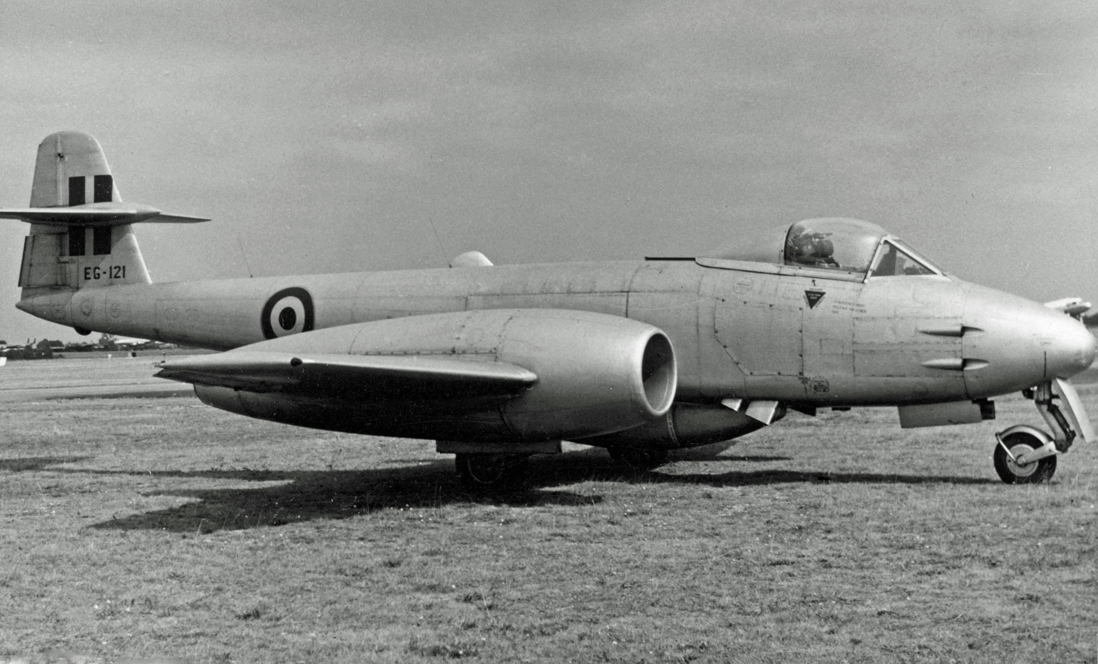
Fokker-built Gloster Meteor of the Belgian Air Force in 1955

Rebuilding after the war proved difficult. The market was flooded with cheap surplus planes from the war. The company cautiously started building gliders and autobuses and converting Dakota transport planes to civilian versions. A few F25s were built. Nevertheless, the S-11 trainer was a success, being purchased by several air forces. The S-14 Machtrainer became one of the first jet trainers, and although not an export success, it served for over a decade with the Royal Netherlands Air Force.

A new factory was built next to Schiphol Airport near Amsterdam in 1951. A number of military planes were built there under license, among them the Gloster Meteor twin-jet fighter and Lockheed's F-104 Starfighter. A second production and maintenance facility was established at Woensdrecht.

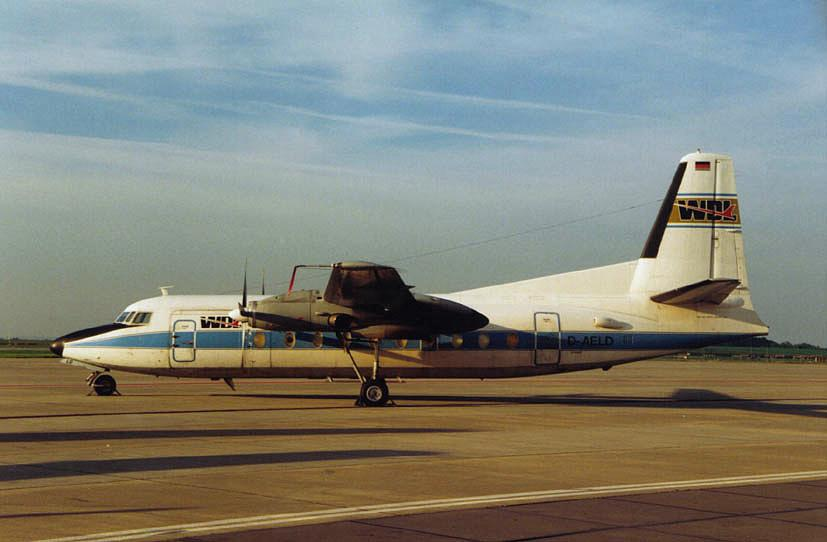
The Fokker F-27 turboprop airliner

In 1958, the F-27 Friendship was introduced, Fokker's most successful postwar airliner. The Dutch government contributed 27 million guilders to its development. Powered by the Rolls-Royce Dart, it became the world's best-selling turboprop airliner, reaching almost 800 units sold by 1986, including 206 under licence by Fairchild. Also, a military version of the F-27, the F-27 Troopship, was built.

In 1962, the F-27 was followed by the jet-powered F-28 Fellowship. Until production stopped in 1987, a total of 241 were built in various versions. Both an F-27 and later an F-28 served with the Dutch Royal Flight, Prince Bernhard himself being a pilot.

In 1969, Fokker agreed to an alliance with Bremen-based Vereinigte Flugtechnische Werke under control of a transnational holding company. They collaborated on an unsuccessful regional jetliner, the VFW-614, of which only 19 were sold. This collaboration ended in early 1980.

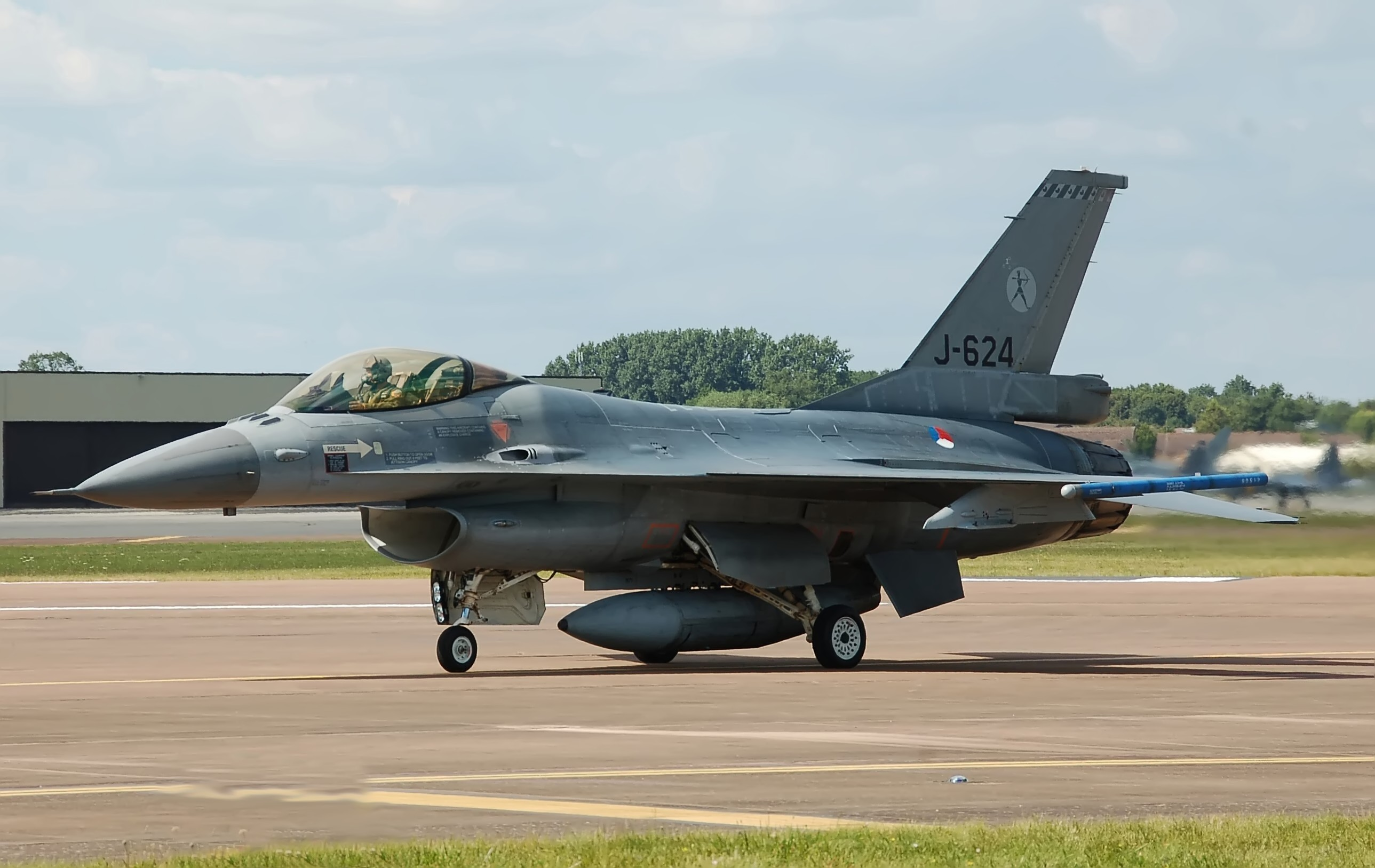
A Fokker-assembled Royal Netherlands Air Force F-16 arrives for the Royal International Air Tattoo, England (2014).

Fokker was one of the main partners in the F-16 Fighting Falcon consortium (European Participating Air Forces), which was responsible for the production of these fighters for the Belgian, Danish, Dutch and Norwegian Air Forces. It consisted of companies and government agencies from these four countries and the United States. F-16s were assembled at Fokker and at SABCA in Belgium with parts from the five countries involved.

=== Aerospace ===
In 1967, Fokker started a modest space division building parts for European satellites. A major advance came in 1968 when Fokker developed the first Dutch satellite (the Astronomical Netherlands Satellite) together with Philips and Dutch universities. This was followed by a second major satellite project, IRAS, successfully launched in 1983. The European Space Agency in June 1974 named a consortium headed by ERNO-VFW-Fokker GmbH to build pressurized modules for Spacelab.

Subsequently, Fokker contributed to many European satellite projects, as well as to the Ariane rocket in its various models. Together with a Russian contractor, they developed the huge parachute system for the Ariane 5 rocket boosters which would allow the boosters to return to Earth safely and be reused.

The space division became more and more independent, until just before Fokker's bankruptcy in 1996, it became a fully stand-alone corporation, known successively as Fokker Space and Systems, Fokker Space, and Dutch Space. On 1 January 2006, it was taken over by EADS-Space Transportation.

=== Fokker 50, Fokker 100, and Fokker 70 ===
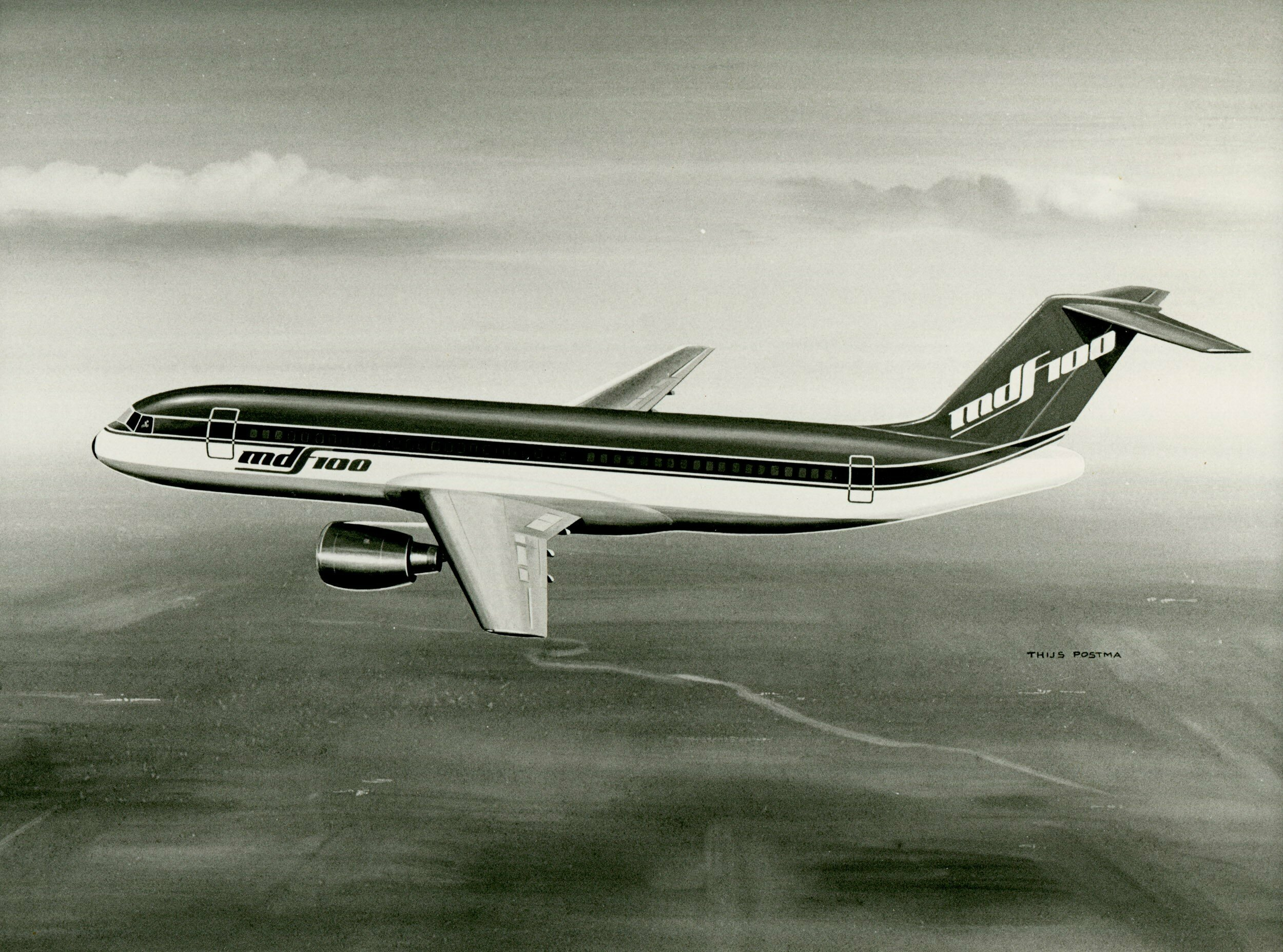
The conceptual McDonnell-Douglas Fokker MDF100 (Fokker F29)

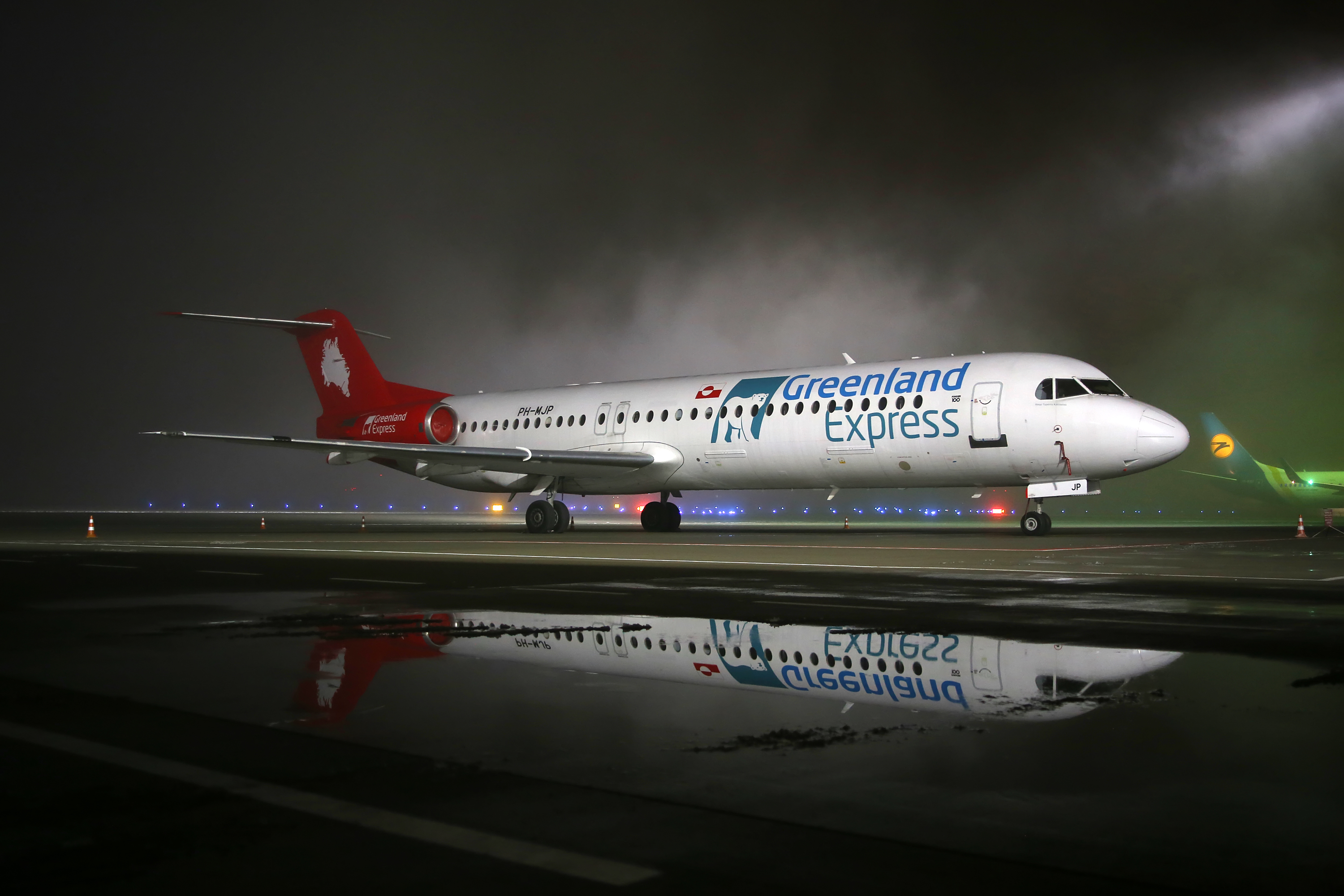
Fokker 100 was Fokker's last successful aircraft

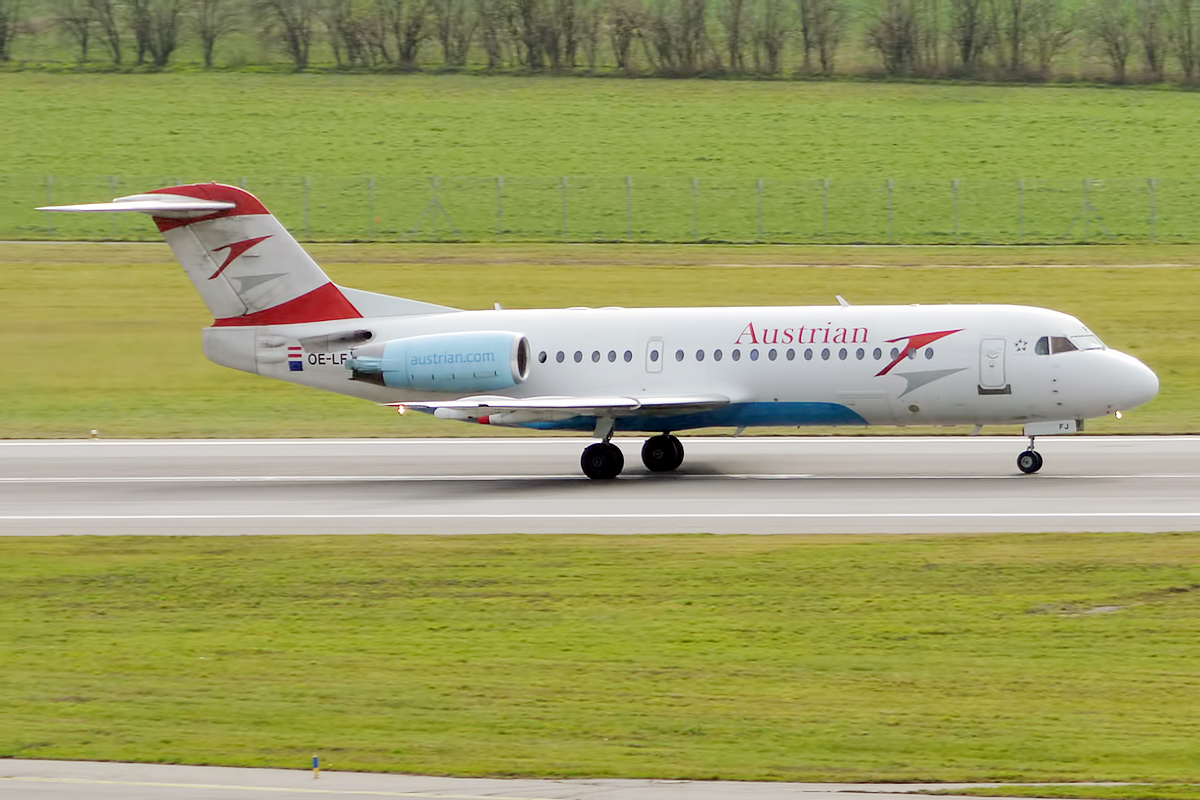
The Fokker 70 was a shortened Fokker 100 design for the short range market.

After a brief and unsuccessful collaboration effort (the conceptual Fokker F29) with McDonnell Douglas in 1981, Fokker began an ambitious project to develop two new aircraft concurrently. The Fokker 50 was to be a completely modernised version of the F-27, and the Fokker 100 a new airliner based on the F-28. Development costs were allowed to spiral out of control, almost forcing Fokker out of business in 1987. The Dutch government bailed the company out with 212 million guilders, but demanded Fokker look for a "strategic partner", British Aerospace and DASA being named most likely candidates.

Initial sales of the Fokker 100 were good, leading Fokker to begin development of the Fokker 70, a smaller version of the F100, in 1991, but sales of the F70 were below expectations and the F100 had strong competition from Boeing and Airbus by then. The Dutch government aircraft between 1996 and 2017 was a Fokker 70.

In 1992, after a long and arduous negotiation process, Fokker signed an agreement with DASA. This did not solve Fokker's problems, though, mostly because DASA's parent company Daimler-Benz also had to deal with its own organisational problems.

=== Bankruptcy ===
On 22 January 1996, the board of directors of Daimler-Benz decided to focus on its core automobile business and cut ties with Fokker. The next day, an Amsterdam court extended temporary creditor protection.

Discussions were initiated with Bombardier on 5 February 1996. After having reviewed and evaluated the opportunities and challenges Fokker represented at the time, Bombardier renounced its acquisition on 27 February. On 15 March, the Fokker company was declared bankrupt.

Differences in national culture could have played a role in the failed takeover of Fokker by Deutsche Aerospace (DASA).

Those divisions of the company that manufactured parts and carried out maintenance and repair work were taken over by Stork N.V., which is now known as Stork Aerospace Group. Stork Fokker exists to sustain remarketing of the company's existing aircraft: it refurbishes and resells F 50s and F 100s, and has converted a few F 50s to transport aircraft. Special projects included the development of an F50 maritime patrol variant and an F100 executive jet. For that project, Stork received the 2005 "Aerospace Industry Award" in the Air Transport category from Flight International magazine.

Other divisions of the company that were profitable continued as separate companies: Fokker Space (later Dutch Space) and Fokker Control Systems.

In November 2009, Stork Aerospace changed its name to Fokker Aerospace Group. As of 2011, the Fokker Aerospace Group changed its name to Fokker Technologies. The five individual business units within Fokker Technologies all carry the Fokker name:

- Fokker Aerostructures
- Fokker Landing Gear
- Fokker Elmo
- Fokker Techniek
- Fokker Services

The former Fokker aircraft facilities at Schiphol were redeveloped into the Fokker Logistics Park. One of the former Fokker tenants is Fokker Services.

In 1996, a new company named Rekkof Aircraft ("Fokker" backwards) attempted to restart production of the Fokker F70 and F100, supported by suppliers and airlines. The company was later renamed to Netherlands Aircraft Company, and started to focus on developing a new aircraft named F130NG. This attempt was not successful either, and the project came to a standstill in 2010. In 2023, after years of no updates, the company was renamed Fokker Next Gen. Along with the new name reveal, the company announced that they are developing a new hydrogen-powered regional airliner. Visualisations have been provided, but the name of the aircraft is yet not publicly disclosed.

In 2015, GKN considered acquiring Fokker Technologies to supply for the hybrid car market. The British automotive and aerospace supplier plans to buy the Netherlands-based Fokker for €706 million.

In 2021, Fokker Services and Fokker Techniek were acquired by Panta Holdings, a Dutch investment fund. The acquisition sought to strengthen Panta Holdings’ aerospace footprint. Panta Holdings also owns Fokker Next Gen.

== Aircraft and pilots ==
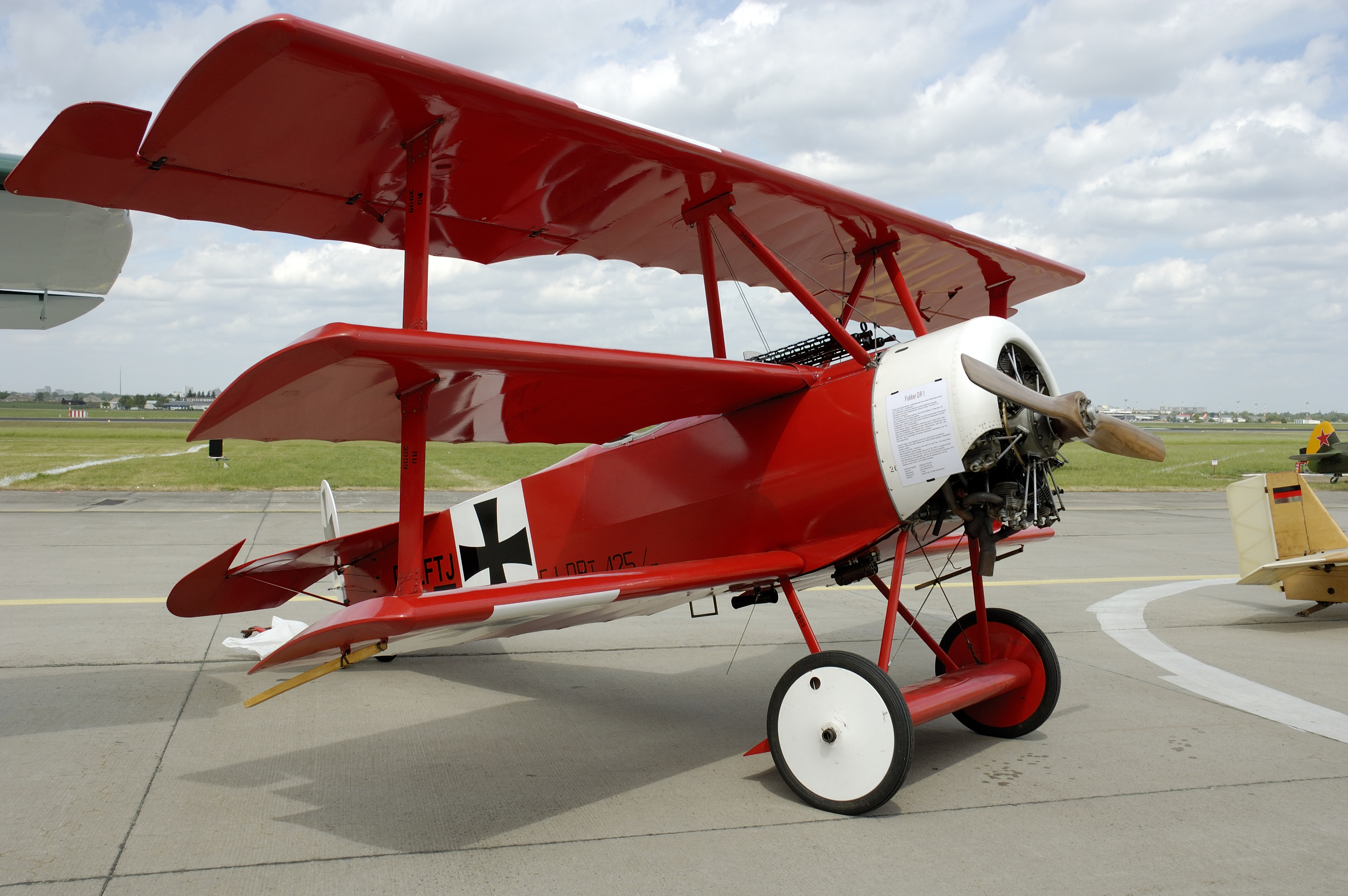
Fokker Dr.I replica at the ILA 2006, the "Red Baron" triplane.

- In 1915, the Fokker E.I was the first fighter armed with a synchronized machine gun firing through the propeller, achieving air superiority during the Fokker Scourge.
- Manfred von Richthofen ("The Red Baron," the top scoring World War I ace) is associated with an all-red Fokker Dr.I triplane, at least for some of his 80 victories (1917–1918)
- The 1918 Fokker D.VII performed so well that surrender of all examples of the type was demanded when Germany capitulated.
- In 1923, Oakley George Kelly and John Arthur Macready completed the first non-stop flight spanning the North American continent in a Fokker T-2.
- In 1927, Richard E. Byrd completed his trans-Atlantic flight from New York City to Paris in the Fokker F.VII America.
- In 1928, Amelia Earhart became the first woman to fly across the Atlantic as a passenger in a Fokker F.VII.
- In 1928, Charles Kingsford Smith completed the first trans-Pacific flight in another F.VII, the Southern Cross.
- Finnish pilot Jorma Sarvanto shot down six Soviet Ilyushin DB-3s in a quick succession using a Fokker D.XXI fighter during the Winter War, drawing international attention.
- The 1951 Fokker S.14 Machtrainer was one of the first purpose-built jet training aircraft in the world.
- King Willem-Alexander of the Netherlands was a co-pilot about twice per month for 21 years on commercial KLM Cityhopper and Martinair flights flying Fokker 70 aircraft.

== Aircraft ==
=== 1912–1921 ===
- Fokker Spin
- Fokker M.1 – M.4 Spin (military version)
- Fokker W.1 – W.2
- Fokker M.5
- Fokker M.6
- Fokker B.I (M.7)
- Fokker W.3/W.4
- Fokker A.I (M.8)
- Fokker K.I (M.9)
- Fokker B.I (M.10E)
- Fokker B.II (M.10Z)
- Fokker M.11
- Fokker M.12
- Fokker Eindecker fighters
  - Fokker E.I (M.14)
  - Fokker E.II (M.14)
  - Fokker E.III (M.14)
  - Fokker E.IV (M.15)
- Fokker M.16E (prototype) and M.16Z
- Fokker D.I/B.III (M.18)
- Fokker D.II (M.17)
- Fokker D.III (M.19)
- Fokker M.20
- Fokker D.IV (M.21)
- Fokker D.V (M.22)
- Fokker V.1
- Fokker V.2 and V.3
- Fokker V.4
- Fokker F.I (V.5)
- Fokker Dr.I ('Dreidecker')
- Fokker V.6
- Fokker V.7
- Fokker V.8
- Fokker V.9, V.12, V.14, V.16 and V.33
- Fokker V.10
- Fokker D.VI (V.11)
- Fokker D.VII (V.13)
- Fokker V.17-V.25
- Fokker E.V/D.VIII (V.26)
- Fokker V.27 and V.37
- Fokker V.28
- Fokker V.29
- Fokker V.30
- Fokker V.31
- Fokker V.32
- Fokker V.34
- Fokker V.35
- Fokker V.36
- Fokker C.I (V.38)
- Fokker V.39 and V.40
- Fokker V.42
- Fokker F.I (V.44)
- Fokker C.I
- Fokker F.VI
- Fokker F.II (V.45)
- Fokker F.III
- Fokker F.IV
- Fokker T.II
- Fokker S.I (V.43)
- Fokker D.IX
- Fokker D.X (V.41)

=== 1922–1940 ===
- Fokker B.I
- Fokker S.II
- Fokker S.III
- Fokker F.V
- Fokker C.IV
- Fokker D.XI
- Fokker DC.I
- Fokker T.III
- Fokker B.II
- Fokker D.XII
- Fokker F.VII
- Fokker C.V
- Fokker D.XIII
- Fokker S.IV
- Fokker D.XIV
- Fokker F.X
- Fokker B.III
- Fokker F.XI "Universal"
- Fokker F.VIII
- Fokker T.IV & T.IVa
- Fokker B.V
- Fokker C.VII-W
- Fokker C.VIII
- Fokker B.IV
- Fokker F.XIII
- Fokker D.XV
- Fokker F.XIV
- Fokker D.XVI
- Fokker F.IX
- Fokker B.VI
- Fokker C.IX
- Fokker F.XI
- Fokker S.V
- Fokker D.XVII
- Fokker F.XII
- Fokker F.XV
- Fokker F.XVI
- Fokker F.XVII
- Fokker F.XXI
- Fokker F.XIX
- Fokker D.XVIII
- Fokker F.XVIII
- Fokker S.VI
- Fokker F.XX
- Fokker C.X
- Fokker S.VII
- Fokker F.36
- Fokker Model 118
- Fokker D.XIX
- Fokker D.XX
- Fokker DC.II
- Fokker T.VI (Model 115)
- Fokker F.22
- Fokker C.XI-W
- Fokker F.23
- Fokker B.V (Model 109)
- Fokker F.40 (Model 160)
- Fokker T.VII
- Fokker F.56 (Model 127)
- Fokker C.XII
- Fokker C.13W
- Fokker D.XXI
- Fokker F.37
- Fokker G.1
- Fokker T.V
- Fokker S.IX
- Fokker T.VI (Model 152)
- Fokker D.22
- Fokker G.2
- Fokker T.VIII
- Fokker T.10
- Fokker D.23
- Fokker F.24 (Model 193)
- Fokker T.IX
- Fokker D.24
- Fokker G.3
- Fokker S.X
- Fokker C.14W
- Fokker C.15W
- Fokker F.60

=== Fokker-Atlantic designs ===
- Fokker A-2 Ambulance
- Fokker AO-1 Artillery Observation / Atlantic Observation
- Fokker C-2
- Fokker C-5
- Fokker C-7
- Fokker C-14
- Fokker C-15
- Fokker C-16
- Fokker C-20
- Fokker CO-4
- Fokker CO-4 Mailplane
- Fokker CO-8
- Fokker LB-2 Light Bomber
- Fokker O-27
- Fokker FLB/PJ (AF.15)
- Fokker PW-5
- Fokker PW-6
- Fokker PW-7
- Fokker RA
- Fokker T-2
- Fokker XA-7 Attack
- Fokker XB-8 Bomber
- Fokker XJA-1
- Fokker XLB-2 Light Bomber
- Fokker B.11 Sport/Trainer
- Fokker F-7
- Fokker F-9 Universal Airliner & freighter
- Fokker F-10
- Fokker F-11
- Fokker F-12
- Fokker F-13
- Fokker F-14
- Fokker F-18 Super Universal Airliner & freighter
- Fokker F-32
- Fokker DH-4M
- Fokker-Hall H-51

=== 1945–1996 ===
- Fokker F.25 Promotor
- Fokker S-11 & S-12 Instructor
- Fokker S-13 Universal Trainer
- Fokker S.14 Machtrainer
- Fokker S.15
- Fokker S.16
- Fokker F26 Phantom
- Fokker F27 Friendship
- Fokker F28 Fellowship
- Fokker F.29
- Fokker 50
- Fokker 60 Utility
- Fokker 70
- Fokker 80
- Fokker 100
- Fokker 120NG (in development)
- Fokker 130 (concept stage only)
- VFW-Fokker/Republic Aviation D-24 Alliance Variable sweep wing VTOL aircraft

== Sources ==
- Bowers, Peter and Ernest McDowell. Triplanes: A Pictorial History of the World's Triplanes and Multiplanes. St. Paul, Minnesota: Motorbooks International, 1993. ISBN 0-87938-614-2.
- Dierikx, Marc. Fokker: A Transatlantic Biography. Washington, D.C.: Smithsonian Institution Press, 1997. ISBN 1-56098-735-9.
- Gerdessen, F. (September–October 2001). "Fokker's 'Paper' Fighters". Air Enthusiast. No. 95. pp. 32–44. ISSN 0143-5450.
- Hegener, Henri. Fokker – the man and the aircraft Herts, UK: Harleyford Publications, 1961. LCCN 61-10595
- Klaauw, Bart van der (March–April 1997). "Fokker's American Years". Air Enthusiast. No. 68. pp. 2–13. ISSN 0143-5450.
- Molson, K.M. Pioneering in Canadian Air Transport. Winnipeg: James Richardson & Sons, 1974. ISBN 0-919212-39-5.
- Nevin, David. The Pathfinders (The Epic of Flight Series). Alexandria, Virginia: Time-Life Books, 1980. ISBN 0-8094-3256-0.
- Postma, Thijs. Fokker: Aircraft Builders to the World. London: Jane's, 1979. ISBN 978-0-71060-059-2.
- Weyl, A.R. Fokker: The Creative Years. London: Putnam, 1965. ISBN 978-0851778174
