= Fokker D.XI =

Dutch fighter aircraft

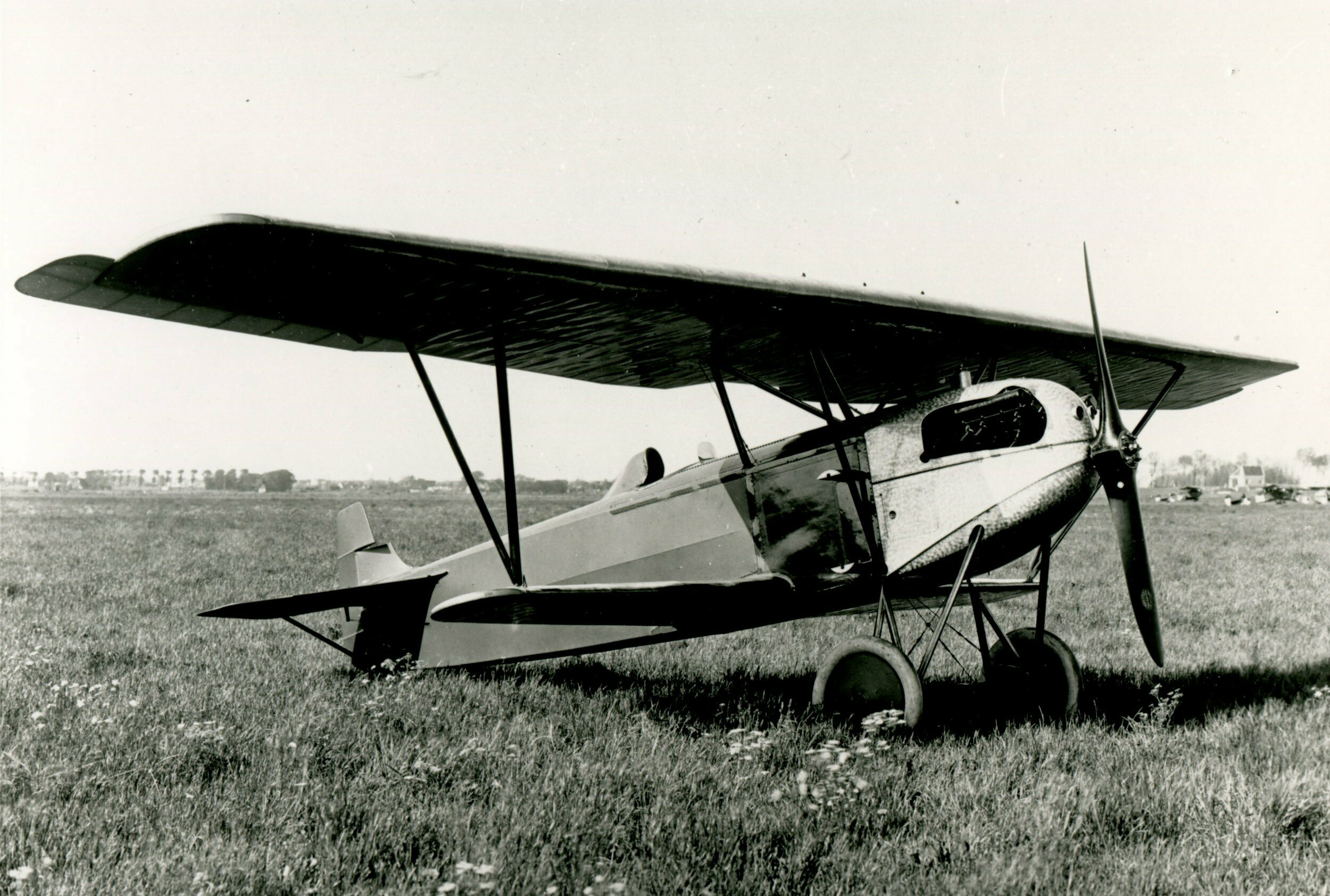

General information
- Type: Single-seat fighter
- Manufacturer: Fokker
- Designer: Reinhold Platz
- Primary user: USSR
- Number built: 117

History
- First flight: 1923

The Fokker D.XI was a 1920s Dutch single-seat fighter designed and built by Fokker

== Design and development ==
The D.XI was designed by Reinhold Platz for Fokker and first flew on 23 March 1923. It was a single-seat sesquiplane (the lower wing was smaller than the upper) with a fixed tailskid landing gear. Due to financial problems, the Dutch government did not place an order, but 117 were built for export. There was some minor changes in design between customers, but all had the single-bay v-strut wing and powered by a 224 kW (300 hp) Hispano-Suiza piston engine. The twin radiators for the engine were mounted on the sides of the nose.

== Operational history ==
The main customer was the USSR who operated the aircraft until 1929. The United States Army bought three aircraft for evaluation with the designation PW-7 and powered by a 328 kW (440 hp) Curtiss D.12. 50 aircraft on order for Germany were cancelled.

== Operators ==
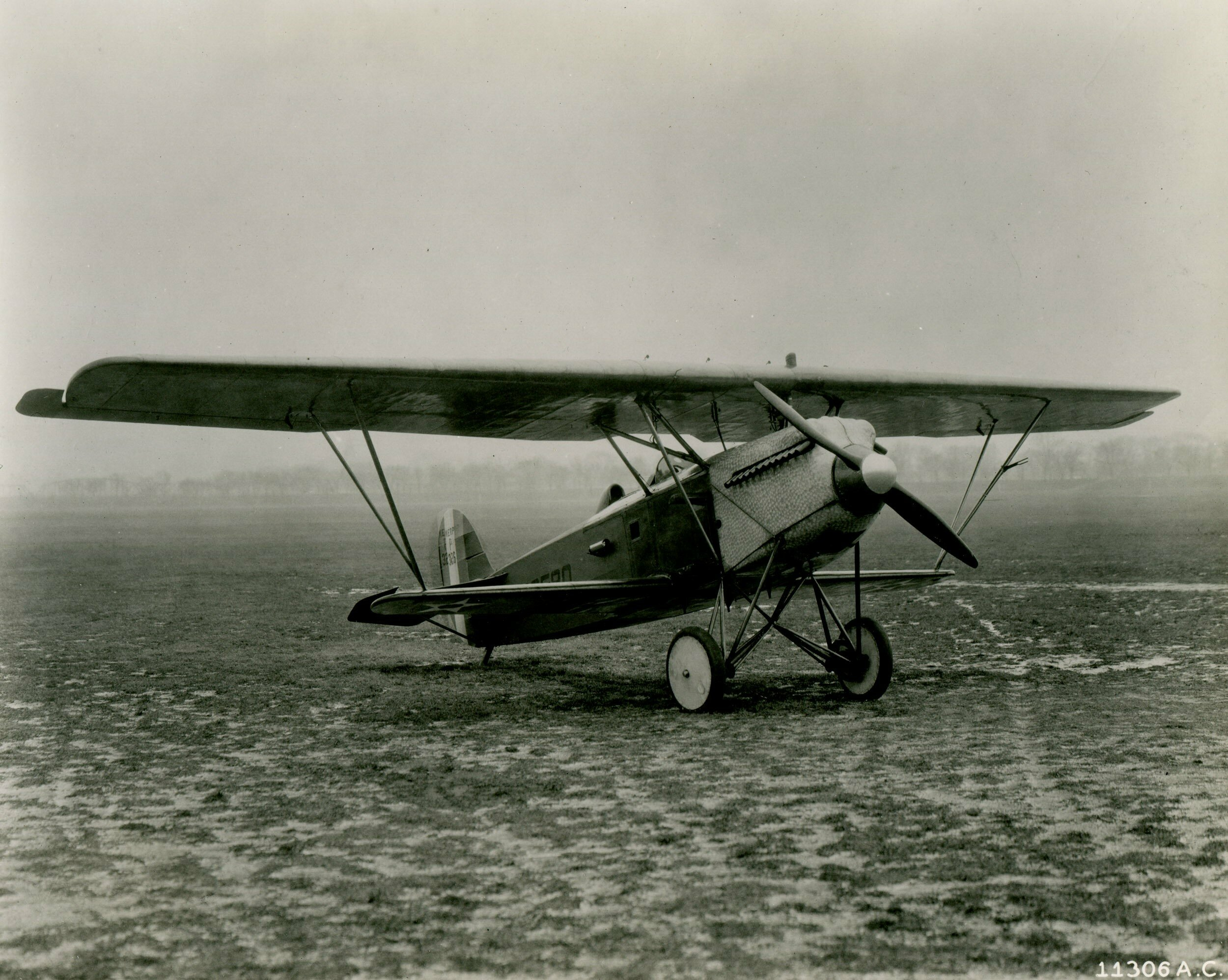
Fokker PW-7

Argentina

- Argentine Army Aviation operated one aircraft

Romania

- Royal Romanian Air Force - 50 purchased 1925

Soviet Union

- Soviet Air Force

Spain

- Spanish Air Force

Switzerland

- Swiss Air Force

United States

- United States Army Air Service

== Specifications ==
Data from The Illustrated Encyclopedia of Aircraft (Part Work 1982-1985), 1985, Orbis Publishing, pages 1874/5

General characteristics

- Crew: 1
- Length: 7.50 m (24 ft 7.25 in)
- Wingspan: 11.67 m (38 ft 3.5 in)
- Height: 3.20 m (10 ft 6 in)
- Wing area: 21.8 m^{2} (234.66 sq ft)
- Empty weight: 865 kg (1,907 lb)
- Gross weight: 1,250 kg (2,756 lb)
- Powerplant: 1 × Hispano-Suiza 8 Fb 8-cylinder Vee piston engine , 224 kW (300 hp)

Performance

- Maximum speed: 225 km/h (140 mph, 120 kn)
- Range: 440 km (273 mi, 237 nmi)
- Service ceiling: 7,000 m (22,965 ft)

Armament

- 2 × 0.303 in (7.7 mm) machine guns (forward facing)

Related lists

- List of military aircraft of the United States
- List of fighter aircraft
