= F29 =

F29 and variants thereof may refer to:

- Fokker F.29, a jetliner
- F29 Retaliator, a flight simulator
- a photoreconnaissance plane, see B-29 Superfortress variants
- Fluorine-29 (F-29 or ^{29}F), an isotope of fluorine
