= Fokker M.16 =

Austro-Hungarian fighter and reconnaissance aircraft

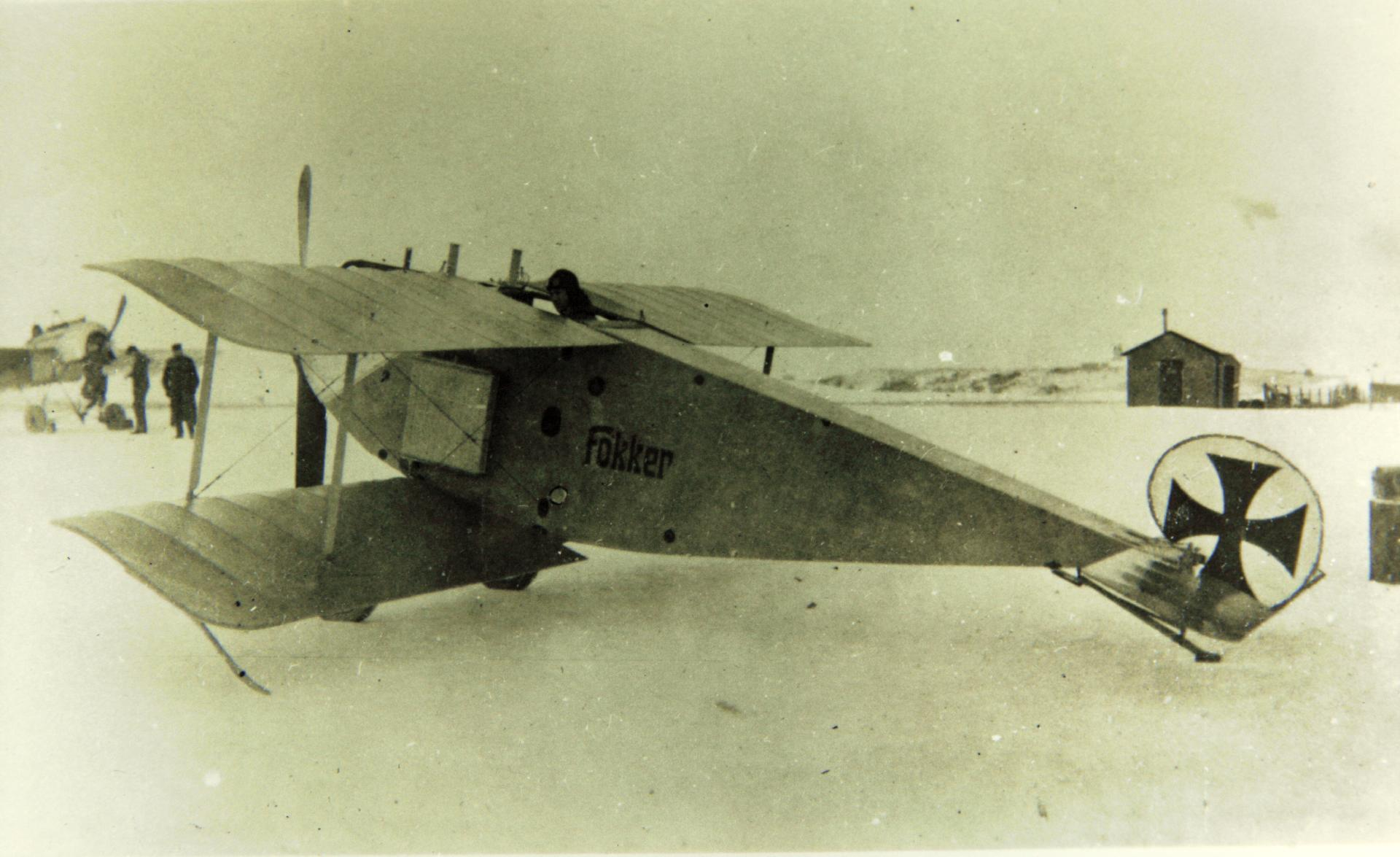
- The single-seat M.16

General information
- Type: Prototype Fighter
- Manufacturer: Fokker
- Number built: 3

History
- First flight: 1915

The Fokker M.16 was a prototype biplane fighter designed by the Fokker Aircraft Company (Fokker-Flugzeugwerke) during the First World War for the Imperial German Army's (Deutsches Heer) Imperial German Air Service (Fliegertruppen des deutschen Kaiserreiches) and the Imperial and Royal Aviation Troops (Kaiserliche und Königliche Luftfahrtruppen or K.u.K. Luftfahrtruppen) of the Austro-Hungarian Empire. Three aircraft were built in 1915–1916, but it was not accepted for service by either nation after a fatal crash during flight testing.

== Background and description ==
By late 1915 Anthony Fokker had become aware that his monoplane fighters like the E.III were outclassed by faster British and French biplanes and he began development of a series of biplanes of his own. He preferred to use a light-weight rotary engine, but he wanted to evaluate the impact of using a heavier, more powerful water-cooled engine. He was uncertain about the relative advantages of single-seat vs two-seat fighter and decided to develop prototypes that would demonstrate the virtues and disadvantages of each of the four configurations. The M.16 was his single-seat design with a water-cooled inline engine.

Fokker designed a very deep fuselage that filled the space between the wings to reduce drag, although the forward upper wing spar was attached to the fuselage with short cabane struts. The pilot's cockpit was flush with the upper wing with only his head protruded above the wing. This provided excellent visibility for everything at the height of his head and above, but his downward and forward vision was seriously impaired by the wing and the engine cowling, despite the cabane struts in front of him. The 100-horsepower (75 kW) Mercedes D.I straight-six piston engine protruded from the metal cowling in the initial version of the M.16 with single-bay wings with its large radiators abreast the cockpit on the sides of the fuselage. (Note: Fokker documentation during this time rarely differentiated between versions of the same aircraft. Postwar researchers adopted the suffixes E (einstielig) for the single-bay version and Z (zweistielig) for the two-bay model.) The aircraft would have been armed with a 7.92 mm (0.312 in) lMG 08/15 machine gun forward of the pilot. Performance proved disappointing and no production order was placed by the Imperial German Air Service.

Fokker modified the aircraft with a two-bay wing and added a rear cockpit for the observer, compensating for the additional weight with a more powerful 160 hp (120 kW) Mercedes D.III straight-six engine. To further reduce drag he fully enclosed the engine in its cowling and enlarged the radiators for better engine cooling. Performance was inferior to that of the Roland C.II of a similar configuration and development was canceled.

News of the M.16 reached the Austro-Hungarian Aviation Troops as the aircraft was conducting its flying trials in November 1915 and the service ordered a prototype on 24 December, because its performance exceeded that of domestic designs. It had already shipped a 160 hp (120 kW) Austro-Daimler straight-six engine to Fokker for the prototype. This version was sometimes referred to the M.16/II in Fokker records; it was given the serial number of 03.91 by the Austro-Hungarians. The engine cowling of this aircraft was streamlined and it was later fitted with smaller radiators that protruded further out from the fuselage to improve cooling. It was armed with a fixed 7.62 mm Schwarzlose MG-16 machine gun for the pilot and another for the observer on a flexible mount.

The prototype was shipped to the Aspern airfield on 16 April 1916 for further trials. The Austro-Hungarians also purchased a license to build the M.16 if the trials were successful. The Austrian subsidiary of the German Aviatik firm was to build the aircraft under the leadership of Alfred Gassner. Work on this began in January and included replacing the steel tubing in the fuselage with wood since Aviatik was unfamiliar with steel-tube construction. This change necessitated modifications to the wings and control surfaces. These impaired the aircraft's performance and new wings and tail surfaces were installed to remedy the loss of performance. The aircraft crashed while testing these on 7 May, killing the pilot and injuring the observer. The program was cancelled and Gassner was fired by Aviatik. The Fokker-built prototype became a training aircraft until it was written off in April 1918.

== Specifications (Serial number 03.91) ==
Data from Austro-Hungarian Army Aircraft of World War One

General characteristics

- Crew: 2, pilot and gunner
- Length: 7.65 m (25 ft 1 in)
- Upper wingspan: 11.6 m (38 ft 1 in)
- Height: 2.85 m (9 ft 4 in)
- Wing area: 32 m^{2} (340 sq ft)
- Empty weight: 620 kg (1,367 lb)
- Gross weight: 1,056 kg (2,328 lb)
- Powerplant: 1 × Austro-Daimler 6 water-cooled straight-six piston engine, 120 kW (160 hp)
- Propellers: 2-bladed

Performance

- Time to altitude: 5 minutes to 1,000 m (3,300 ft)
- 13 minutes to 2,000 m (6,600 ft)
- 26 minutes to 3,000 m (9,800 ft)

Armament
1 fixed and 1 flexible 7.92 mm (0.312 in) Schwarzlose MG-16 machine guns

== Bibliography ==
- Gray, Peter & Thetford, Owen (1987) [1970]. German Aircraft of the First World War (2nd ed.). London: Putnam. ISBN 0-85177-809-7.
- Green, William & Swanborough, Gordon (2001) [1994]. The Complete Book of Fighters: An Illustrated Encyclopedia of Every Fighter Built and Flown (Revised and updated ed.). London: Salamander Books. ISBN 1-84065-269-1.
- Grosz, Peter Michael; Haddow, George & Schiemer, Peter (1993). Austro-Hungarian Army Aircraft of World War One. Mountain View, California: Flying Machines Press. ISBN 0-9637110-0-8.
- Herris, Jack & Leckscheid, Jörn (2021). Fokker Aircraft of WWI: Volume III: Early Biplane Fighters: A Centennial Perspective on Great War Airplanes III. Great War Aviation Centennial Series. Vol. 53. n.p.: Aeronaut Books. ISBN 978-1-953201-05-8.
- Leaman, Paul (2001). Fokker Aircraft of World War One. Marlborough, UK: Crowood Press. ISBN 1-86126-353-8.
