= Fokker W.2 =

W.2
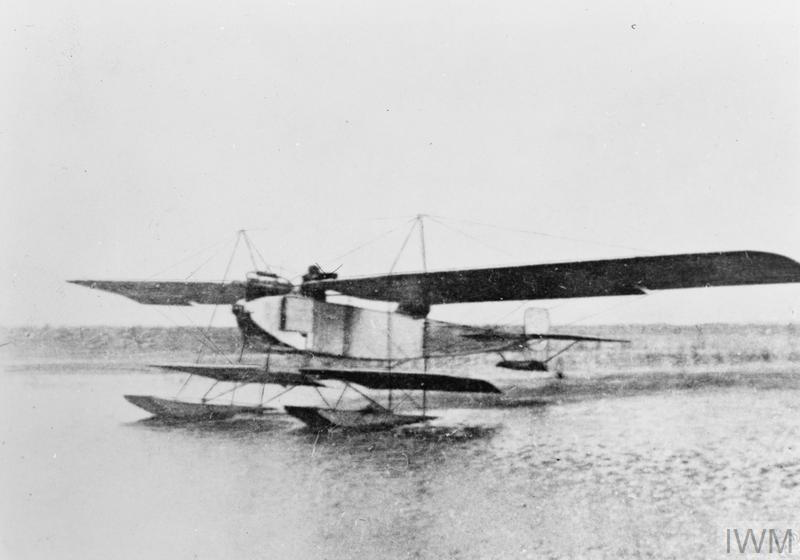
- The W.2 taking off

General information
- Type: Prototype maritime patrol aircraft
- Manufacturer: Fokker
- Designer: Anthony Fokker
- Number built: 1

History
- First flight: 1913

The Fokker W.2 was a prototype two-seat biplane floatplane intended to meet an Imperial German Navy requirement for a maritime patrol aircraft. During flight testing its designer, Anthony Fokker, discovered that it could not meet the requirements. He subsequently ordered it to be dismantled and used many of its components in the W.3 hydroplane.

== Bibliography ==
- Herris, Jack (2020). Fokker Aircraft of WWI: Volume 1: Spinne–M.10 & Watercraft: A Centennial Perspective on Great War Airplanes. Great War Aviation Centennial Series. Vol. 51. n.p.: Aeronaut Books. ISBN 978-1-953201-05-8.
- Leaman, Paul (2001). Fokker Aircraft of World War One. Marlborough, UK: Crowood Press. ISBN 1-86126-353-8.
