= Fokker F.25 =

Single-engined, four-seat passenger monoplane

F.25 Promotor
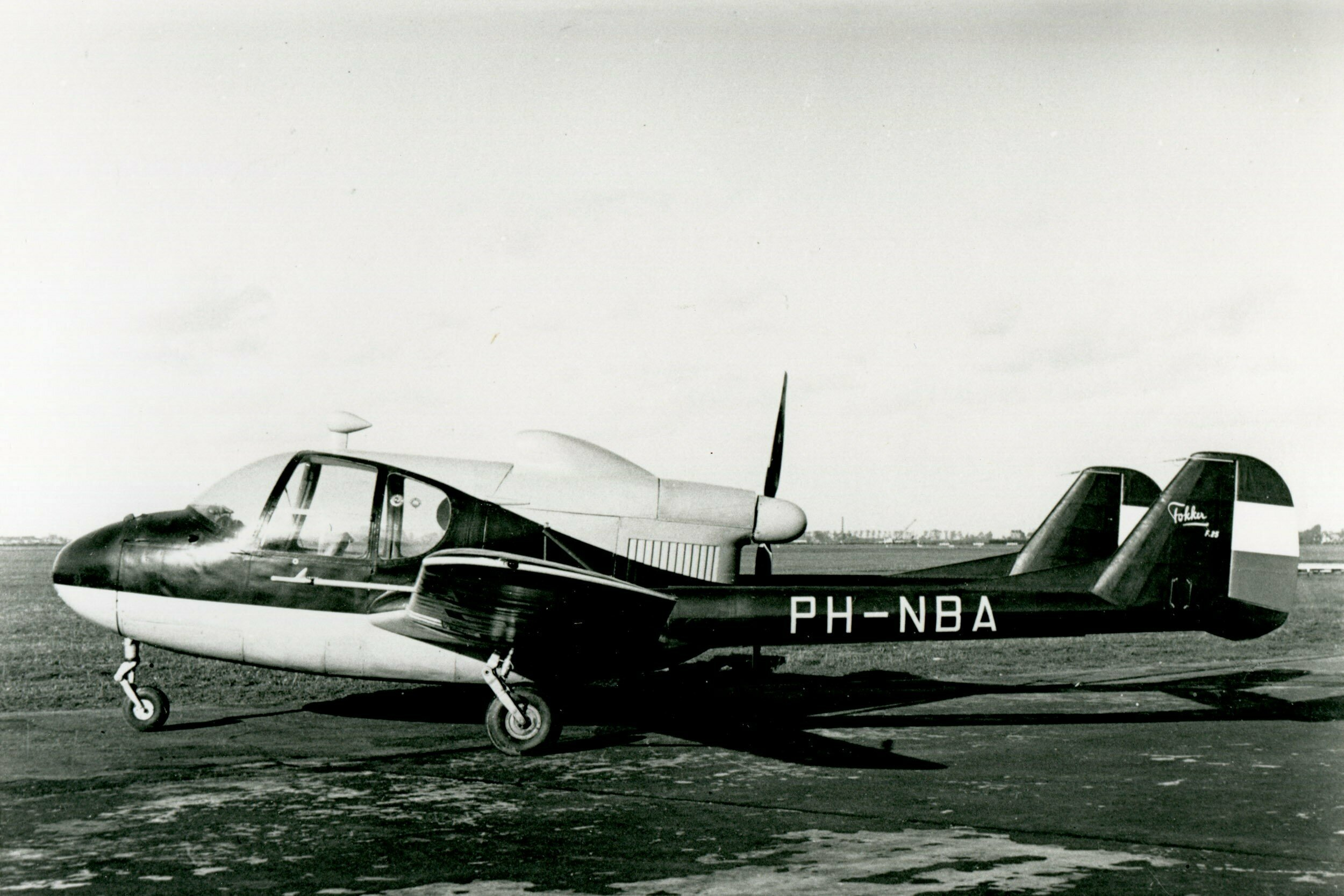
- Fokker F25

General information
- Type: Civil utility aircraft
- Manufacturer: Fokker
- Number built: 20

History
- First flight: October 20, 1946

The Fokker F.25 Promotor, first flown in 1946, was a single-engined, twin-boomed, four-seat passenger monoplane with a pusher engine mounted at the rear of a central nacelle. It was of wooden construction and has fitted with a retractable nosewheel undercarriage. One feature of the design was that instead of a 2 + 2 seating, the pilot sat in front to the left, and all three passengers were on a bench seat to the rear of him. Alternatively, when being used as an air ambulance aircraft, it could carry a patient on a stretcher, which was loaded through a hatch in the aircraft's nose. The F.25 was evocative of the pre-war G.I design.

During World War II, Frits Diepen, a car dealer, had a twin boom aircraft powered by a 98 hp (73 kW) Ford V-8 engine designed and built at Bergen-op-Zoom. This aircraft emerged postwar as the Diepen Difoga 421 aircraft, and was flown for the first time in 1946, but proved unsuccessful.

Diepen then contracted Fokker to design and build a new aircraft of similar layout to the Difoga, which became the Fokker F.25 Promotor. Diepen intended to use the Promotor as an air taxi and charter aircraft, placing an order for 100 aircraft, and also negotiated exclusive sales rights to the Promotor. The first example made its maiden flight on 20 October 1946 and later that year was exhibited at the Paris Air Show.

Production was stopped in 1949 after 20 F.25s had been completed. They could not compete in cost against large numbers of surplus military aircraft available at bargain prices following the end of the war, while Fokker required its production capacity to concentrate on the Fokker S.11 Instructor trainer. Only three of the aircraft were flown.

== Specifications (Fokker F.25 with O-435-A engine) ==
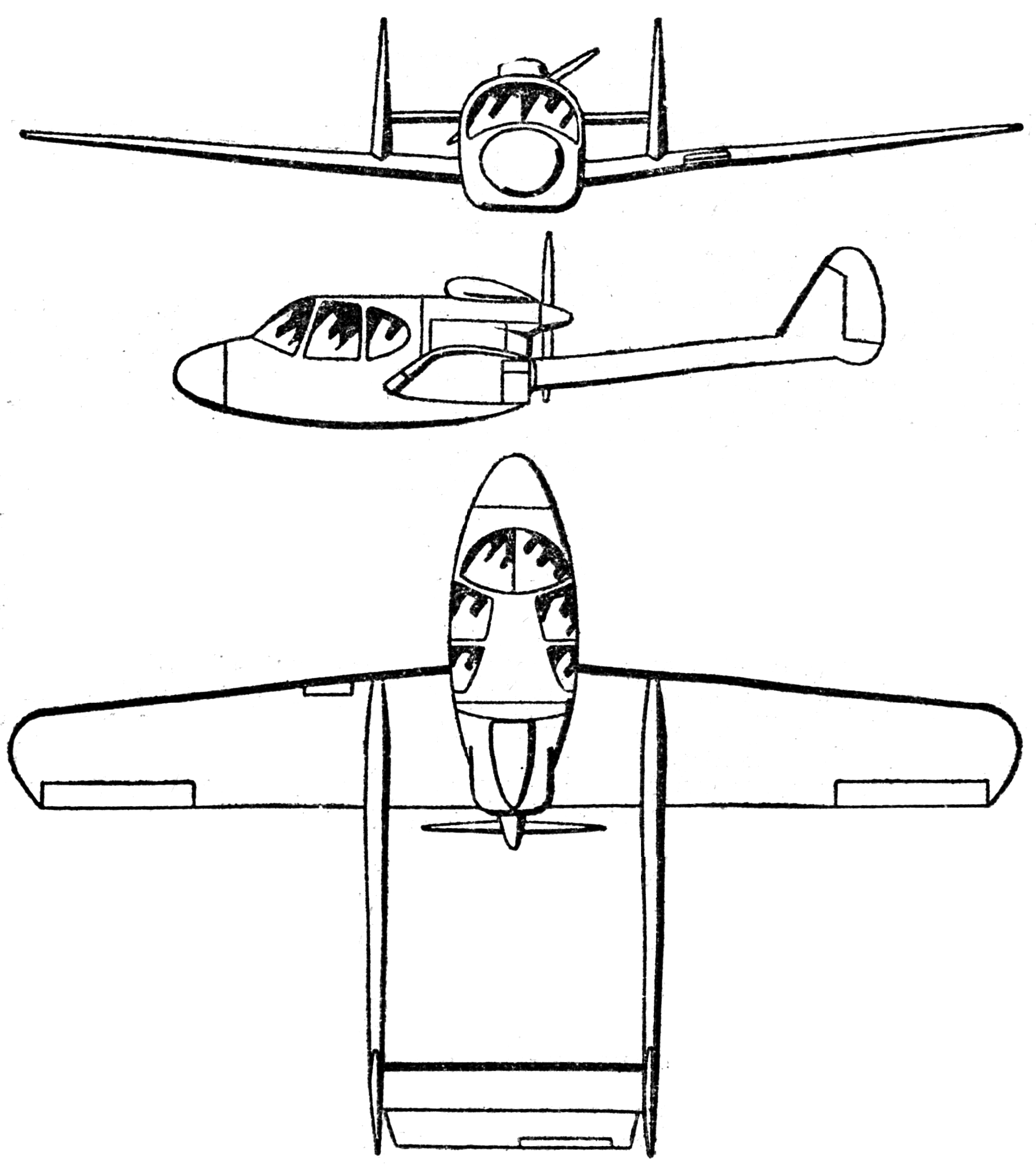
Fokker Promotor 3-view drawing from Les Ailes February 8, 1947

Data from Jane's All the World's Aircraft 1947, Promotor In The Air

General characteristics

- Crew: 1 pilot
- Capacity: 3 passengers
- Length: 8.5 m (27 ft 11 in)
- Wingspan: 12 m (39 ft 4 in)
- Height: 2.4 m (7 ft 10 in)
- Wing area: 17.5 m^{2} (188 sq ft)
- Empty weight: 920 kg (2,028 lb)
- Gross weight: 1,350 kg (2,976 lb)
- Fuel capacity: 200 L (53 US gal; 44 imp gal)
- Powerplant: 1 × Lycoming O-435-A 6-cylinder air-cooled horizontally-opposed piston engine, 140 kW (190 hp) at 2,550 rpm for take-off

100 kW (140 hp) at 2,300 rpm at 1,000 m (3,300 ft)

- Propellers: 2-bladed two position or constant-speed pusher propeller

Performance

- Maximum speed: 217 km/h (135 mph, 117 kn) at sea level
- Cruise speed: 195 km/h (121 mph, 105 kn) at 1,000 m (3,300 ft)
- Landing speed: 90 km/h (56 mph; 49 kn)
- Range: 515 km (320 mi, 278 nmi) with 87 kg (192 lb) fuel

850 km (530 mi; 460 nmi) with maximum fuel

- Service ceiling: 3,600 m (11,800 ft)
- Absolute ceiling: 4,400 m (14,400 ft)
- Rate of climb: 2.7 m/s (530 ft/min)
- Time to altitude:

1,000 m (3,300 ft) in 7 minutes 12 seconds
2,000 m (6,600 ft) in 16 minutes 6 seconds
3,000 m (9,800 ft) in 30 minutes

- Wing loading: 77 kg/m^{2} (16 lb/sq ft)
- Power/mass: 0.0637 hp/lb (0.1047 kW/kg)
- Take-off run: 230 m (750 ft) in a 5 km/h (3.1 mph; 2.7 kn) wind
- Landing run: 150 m (490 ft)
- Specific fuel consumption: 0.088 kg/kW/ks (0.52 lb/hp/h) at cruising speed
