= Fokker F-14 =

American passenger transport aircraft

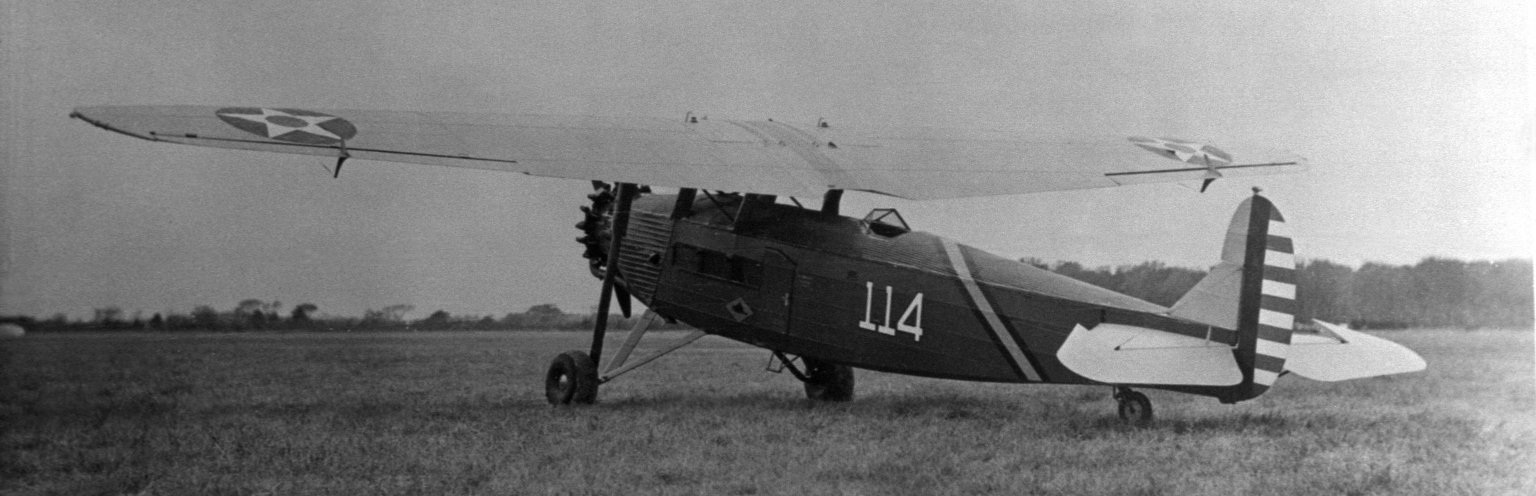
- Fokker C-14

General information
- Type: Passenger transport monoplane
- Manufacturer: Atlantic Aircraft
- Primary user: United States Army Air Corps

History
- First flight: 1929

The Fokker F-14 was an American seven/nine passenger transport aircraft designed by Fokker and built by their Atlantic Aircraft factory in New Jersey.

== Development ==
The F-14 was a typical Fokker designed single-engine transport but unusually it had a parasol-type high wing carried on struts above the fuselage. It had a fixed tailwheel landing gear. The pilot had a cockpit behind the passenger cabin.

== Variants ==
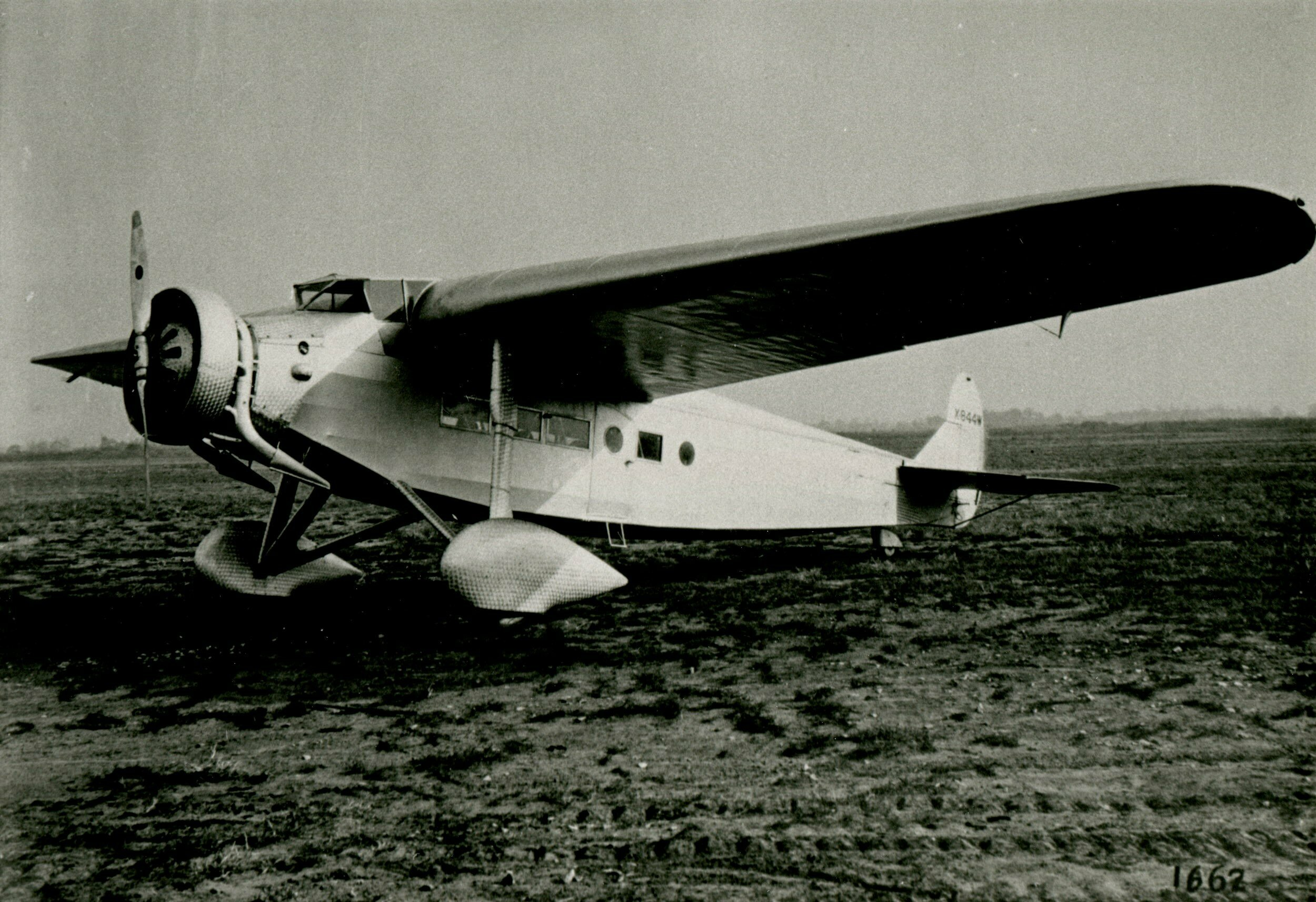
The Fokker F-14A passenger airliner.

F-14
Civil production version with a 525 hp (391 kW) Wright R-1750-3 radial engine.
F-14A
Civilian aircraft with 575 hp (429 kW) Pratt & Whitney R-1690 Hornet radial and wing mounted directly on fuselage.

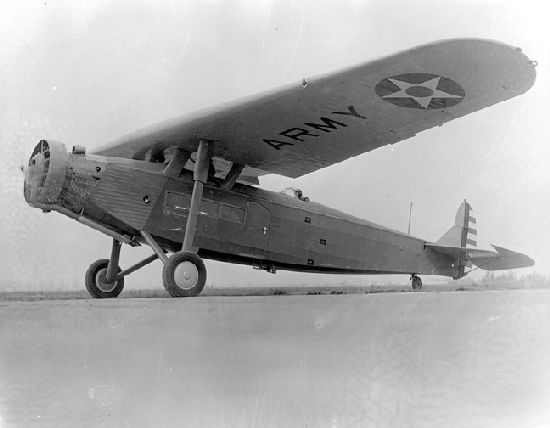
C-14

Y1C-14
Designation for 20 Hornet-powered examples bought for the United States Army Air Corps in 1931, later became the C-14.
Y1C-14A
Last of the 20 Y1C-14s re-engined with a 575 hp (429 kW) Wright R-1820-7 Cyclone.
Y1C-14B
Re-engined with a 525 hp (391 kW) Pratt & Whitney R-1690-5 Hornet.

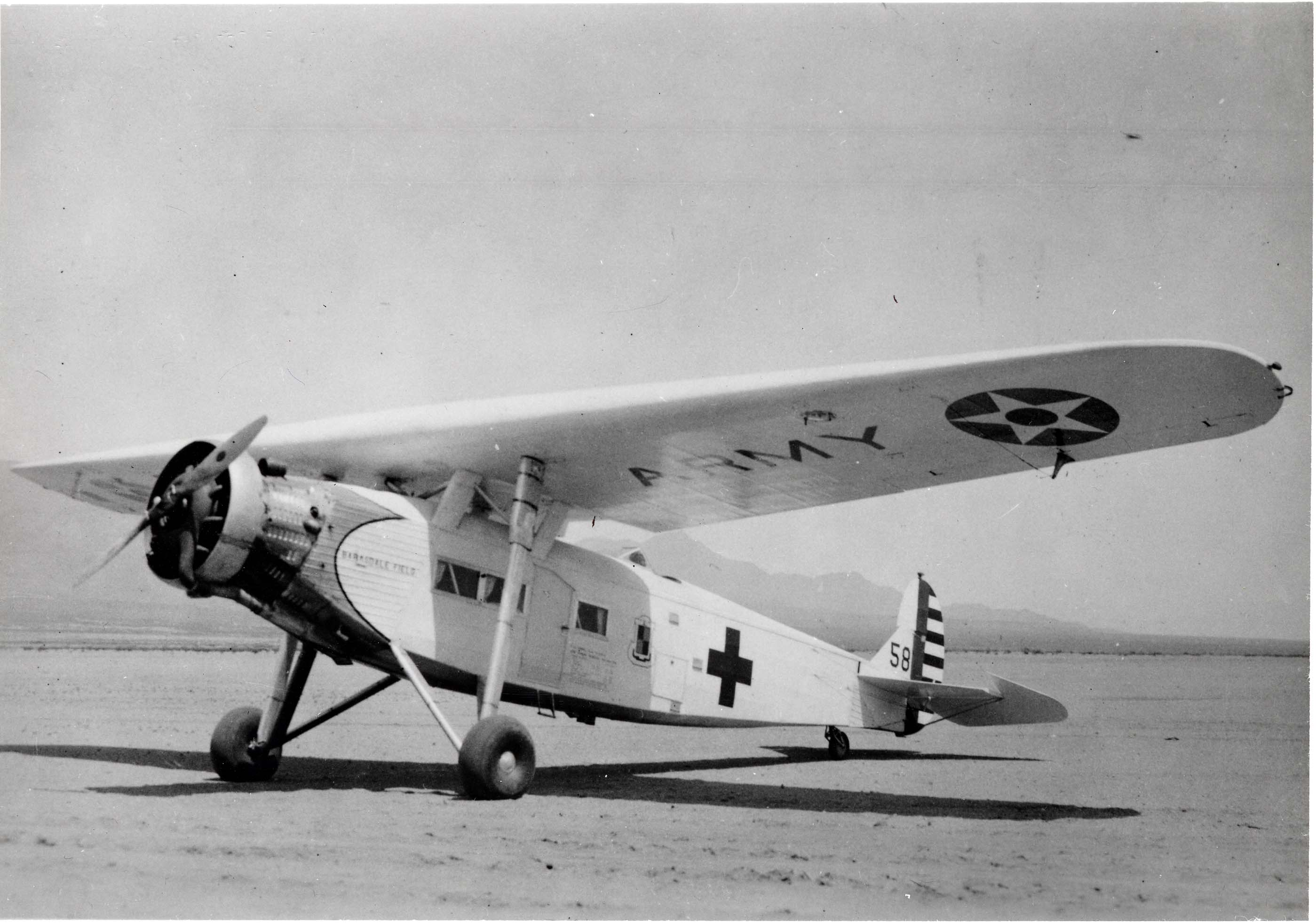
The Y1C-15

Y1C-15
Conversion of the ninth Y1C-14 as an air ambulance.
Y1C-15A
F-14 re-engined with a 575 hp (429 kW) Wright R-1820 Cyclone, later C-15A.

== Operators ==
Canada

- MacKenzie Air Services
- Western Canada Airways

United States

- Standard Air Lines
- Transcontinental & Western Air
- United States Army Air Corps

== Specifications (F-14) ==
Data from The Illustrated Encyclopedia of Aircraft (Part Work 1982-1985), 1985, Orbis Publishing, Page 1878

General characteristics

- Crew: 1
- Capacity: seven/nine passengers
- Length: 43 ft 3 in (13.18 m)
- Wingspan: 59 ft 5 in (18.11 m)
- Height: 12 ft 4 in (3.76 m)
- Wing area: 551 sq ft (51.19 m^{2})
- Empty weight: 4,346 lb (1,971 kg)
- Gross weight: 7,200 lb (3,266 kg)
- Powerplant: 1 × Wright R-1750-3 9-cylinder radial , 525 hp (391 kW)

Performance

- Maximum speed: 137 mph (220 km/h, 119 kn)
- Range: 690 mi (1,100 km, 600 nmi)
- Service ceiling: 14,500 ft (4,420 m)

Related lists

- List of military aircraft of the United States
