= Fokker S.I =

Dutch trainer aircraft

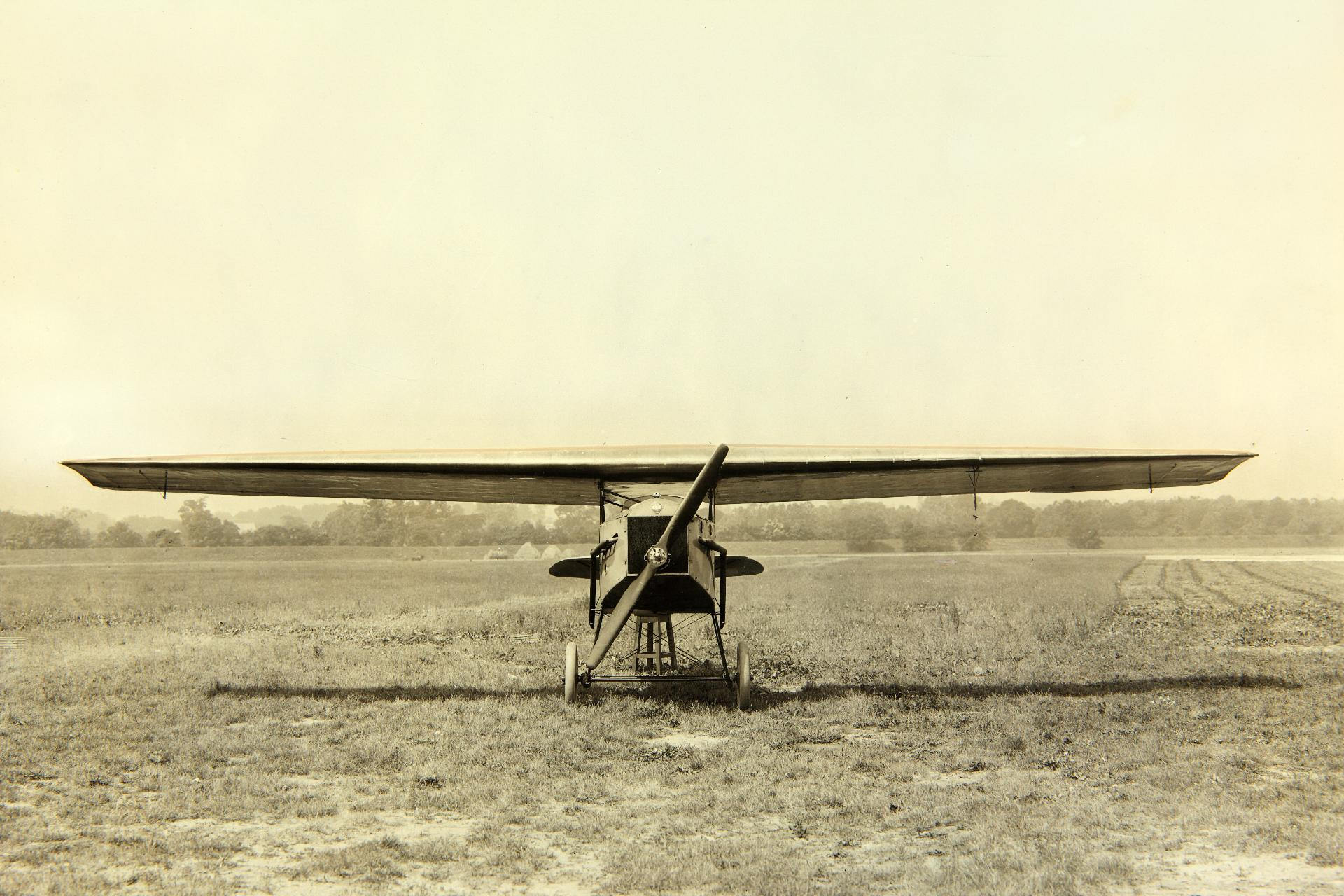

General information
- Type: Primary trainer
- Manufacturer: Fokker
- Designer: Reinhold Platz
- Primary users: USSR United States Army Air Service
- Number built: 3 (and one prototype)

History
- First flight: 1919

The Fokker S.I was a Dutch primary trainer, first flown in 1919 and the first of a family of trainers from the Fokker company.

== Development ==
The S.I was designed by Reinhold Platz as a primary trainer with a cantilever parasol wing with two side-by side seats for instructor and pupil in a wide cockpit. It first flew in early 1919 at Schwerin. Although the prototype performed well, the unusual cantilever parasol wing was not liked and only three production aircraft were built.

Two production aircraft were powered by 60 kW (80 hp) Le Rhône engines and were exported to the USSR and one other aircraft was built for the United States Army Air Service for evaluation at McCook Field. The USAAS aircraft was powered by a 67 kW (90 hp) Curtiss OX-5 engine and was designated the TW-4 (Trainer Water-cooled).

== Operators ==
Soviet Union

- Soviet Air Force

United States

- United States Army Air Service as the TW-4.

== Specifications (TW-4) ==
Data from Wesselink

General characteristics

- Crew: 2
- Length: 8.91 m (29 ft 3 in)
- Wingspan: 12.71 m (41 ft 8 in)
- Gross weight: 893 kg (1,969 lb)
- Propellers: 2-bladed

Performance

- Maximum speed: 138 km/h (86 mph, 75 kn)

== See also ==
Related lists

- List of military aircraft of the United States
