= Fokker W.1 =

W.1
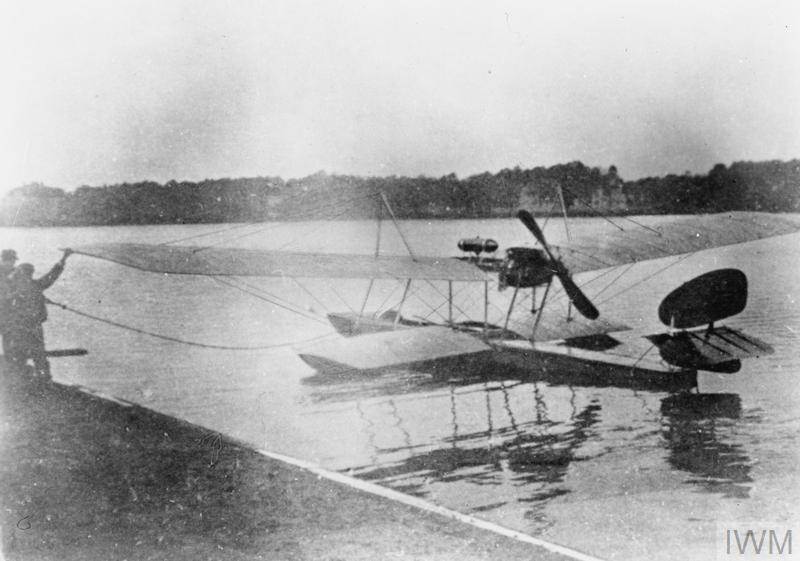

General information
- Type: Experimental aircraft
- Manufacturer: Fokker
- Designer: Anthony Fokker
- Number built: 1

History
- First flight: 9 February 1913

The Fokker W.1 was a two-seat experimental biplane flying boat that first flew in 1913. Built by Anthony Fokker it was an unsuccessful design and development ceased after it crashed during flight testing.

== Bibliography ==
- Herris, Jack (2020). Fokker Aircraft of WWI: Volume 1: Spinne–M.10 & Watercraft: A Centennial Perspective on Great War Airplanes. Great War Aviation Centennial Series. Vol. 51. n.p.: Aeronaut Books. ISBN 978-1-953201-05-8.
- Leaman, Paul (2001). Fokker Aircraft of World War One. Marlborough, UK: Crowood Press. ISBN 1-86126-353-8.
