= Fokker F.29 =

Conceptual jet airliner design

Fokker F29
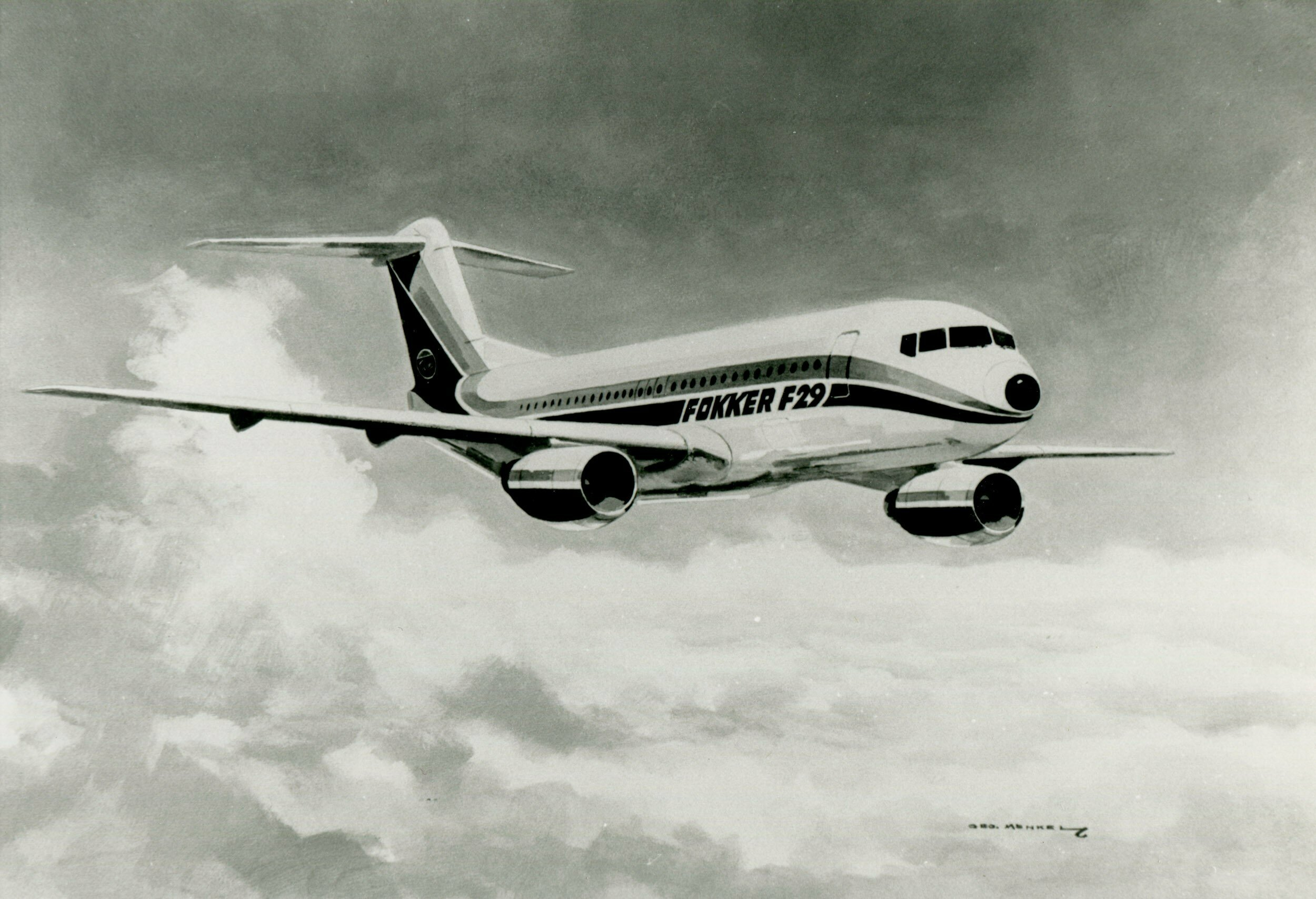
- Promotional image

General information
- Type: Jet airliner
- Manufacturer: Fokker
- Designer: Fokker
- Status: Concept

The Fokker F29 was a conceptual jet airliner design by the Dutch aircraft manufacturer, Fokker.

== Development ==
By the late 1970s, Fokker had two ageing aircraft models in production and were looking for a new move in the market. Fokker recognized the huge size of the replacement market as thousands of Boeing 727s and 737s, Douglas DC-9s and BAC 1-11s would shortly be twenty years old.

Fokker proposed the F.29 airliner in 1979, a 138-seat aircraft. By that time, Fokker had already spent 150 million guilders in development costs. Its first flight was planned for late 1983, entry into service was planned for early 1985. The aircraft was initially priced at $17 million. A stretched version with a 160 to 180 seat capacity was projected for the second half of the 1980s.

Competition was formidable. Boeing launched the 737-300 and McDonnell-Douglas had already marketed a stretched and updated version of the DC-9, the DC-9 Super 80. Airbus was also considering their SA1, which would eventually become the A320.

== Design ==
The overall layout of the aircraft took the stretched fuselage of the F.28, with an all-new supercritical wing and two wing-mounted turbofan engines. The tailsection was also a derivative of the F.28, with its high mounted elevators and characteristic airbrakes. Cabin layout however, was to be six abreast. Fokker openly admitted that the fuselage cross section was a copy of Boeing's fuselage from the 707/727/737.

Two types of engines were considered, the CFM International CFM56 and the proposed Rolls-Royce/JAEC RJ500.

== Collaboration ==
Fokker positively searched for industrial partners, as this project was simply too big for them to handle on their own. Negotiations were held with Airbus, Boeing and the Japanese aircraft industry. The search failed as it quickly became apparent that Airbus had its own plans with the SA1 and Boeing was using all its resources on design and preproduction of the Boeing 757 and 767. Moreover, Boeing was revamping the 737 into the -300 series. The Japanese industry was more inclined towards cooperation with larger partners, like Airbus or Boeing.

== Demise ==
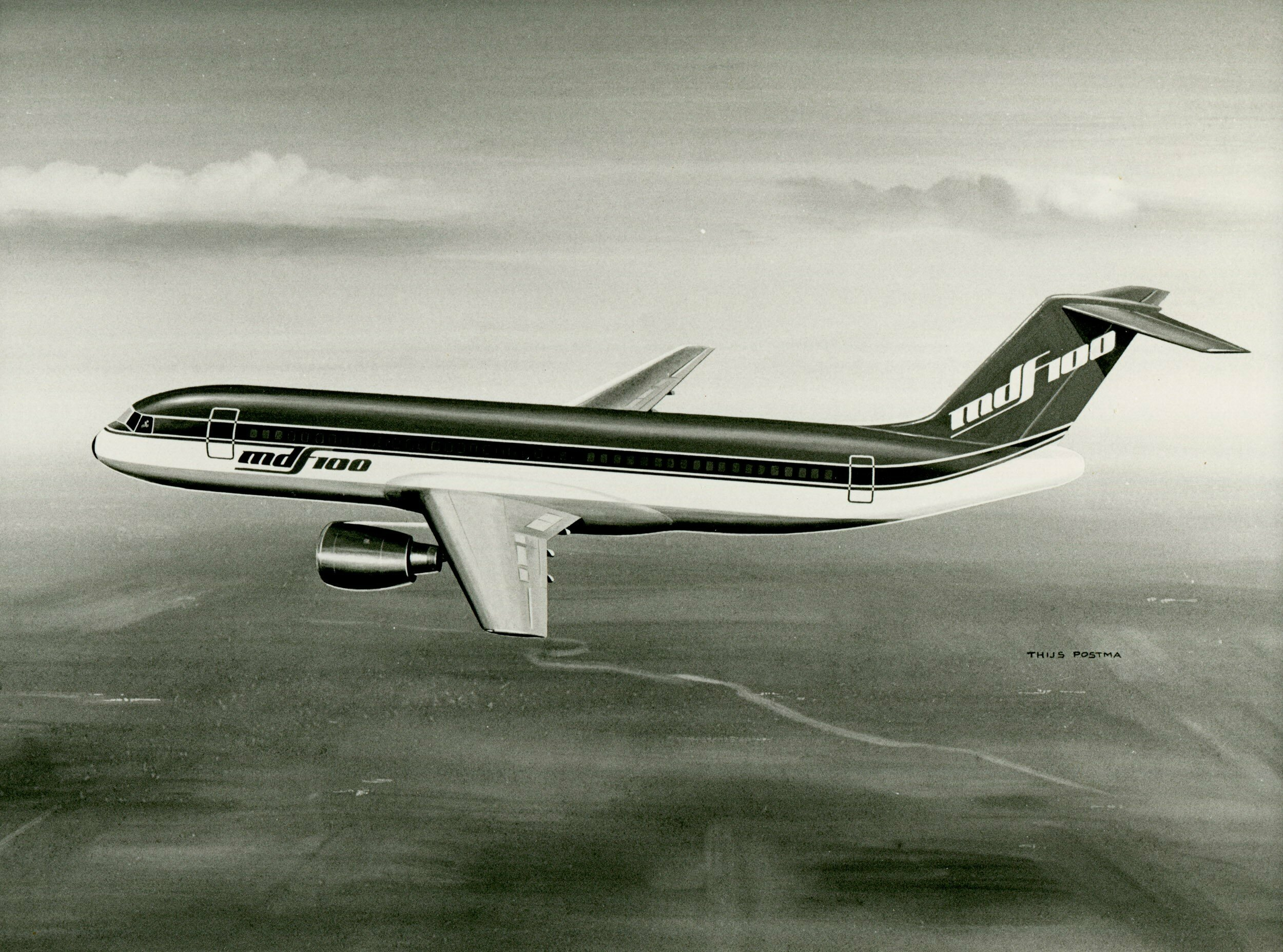
The proposed McDonnell-Douglas Fokker MDF.100

Fokker found it difficult to attract industrial partners or to interest airlines into ordering the F.29. It eventually found a partner in McDonnell-Douglas. The American company already had plans to design a new model, the 180-seat DC-XX. Together the two parties came up with the MDF.100, a mix of the F.29 and the DC-XX.

== Specifications (Fokker F29) ==
General characteristics

- Crew: Two
- Capacity: 138 passengers in std config(max pax=156)
- Length: 39.41 m (129 ft 4 in)
- Wingspan: 32.88 m (107 ft 10 in)
- Height: 10.57 m (34 ft 8 in)
- Max takeoff weight: 59,700 kg (131,616 lb)
- Powerplant: 2 × turbofan engines

Performance

- Maximum speed: 740 km/h (460 mph, 400 kn)
- Maximum speed: Mach 0.85
- Cruise speed: 630 km/h (390 mph, 340 kn) (M 0.79)
- Service ceiling: 11,278 m (37,001 ft)

== See also ==
Related development

- Fokker F28
- Fokker 50

Aircraft of comparable role, configuration, and era

- Douglas DC-9
- Boeing 737

Related lists

- List of military aircraft of the United States
- List of civil aircraft
