= Fokker Spin =

Airplane built by Anthony Fokker

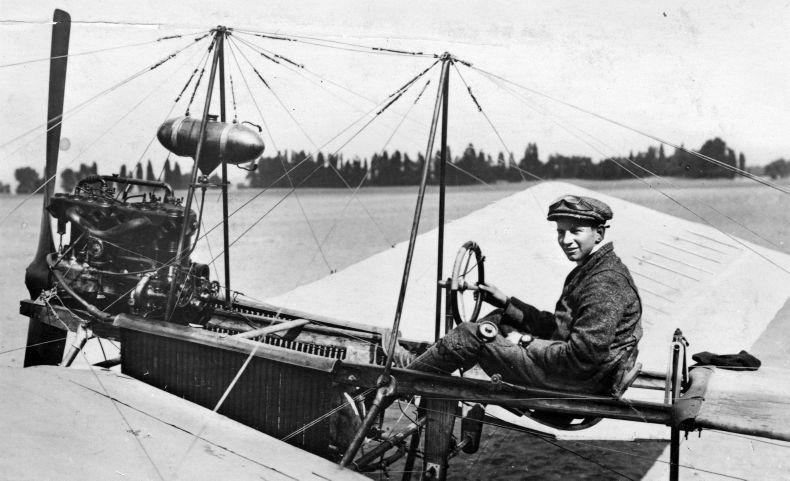
- Fokker in his Spin

General information
- Type: Experimental Aircraft
- Manufacturer: Fokker
- Designer: Anthony Fokker
- Number built: 25

History
- First flight: 1910

The Fokker Spin was the first airplane built by Dutch aviation pioneer Anthony Fokker. The many bracing wires used to strengthen the aircraft made it resemble a giant spider, hence its name Spin, Dutch for "spider".

== History ==
Fokker built the Spin in 1910 while he was a student in Germany, assisted by Jacob Goedecker and a business partner, Franz von Daum, who procured the engine. The aircraft started out as an experimental design to provide Fokker with a means to explore his interest in flying. The first Spin was destroyed when Von Daum flew it into a tree, but the engine was still salvageable and was used to build the second version. This was built soon afterwards and was used by Fokker to teach himself to fly and to obtain his pilot license. This aircraft was also irreparably damaged by Von Daum.

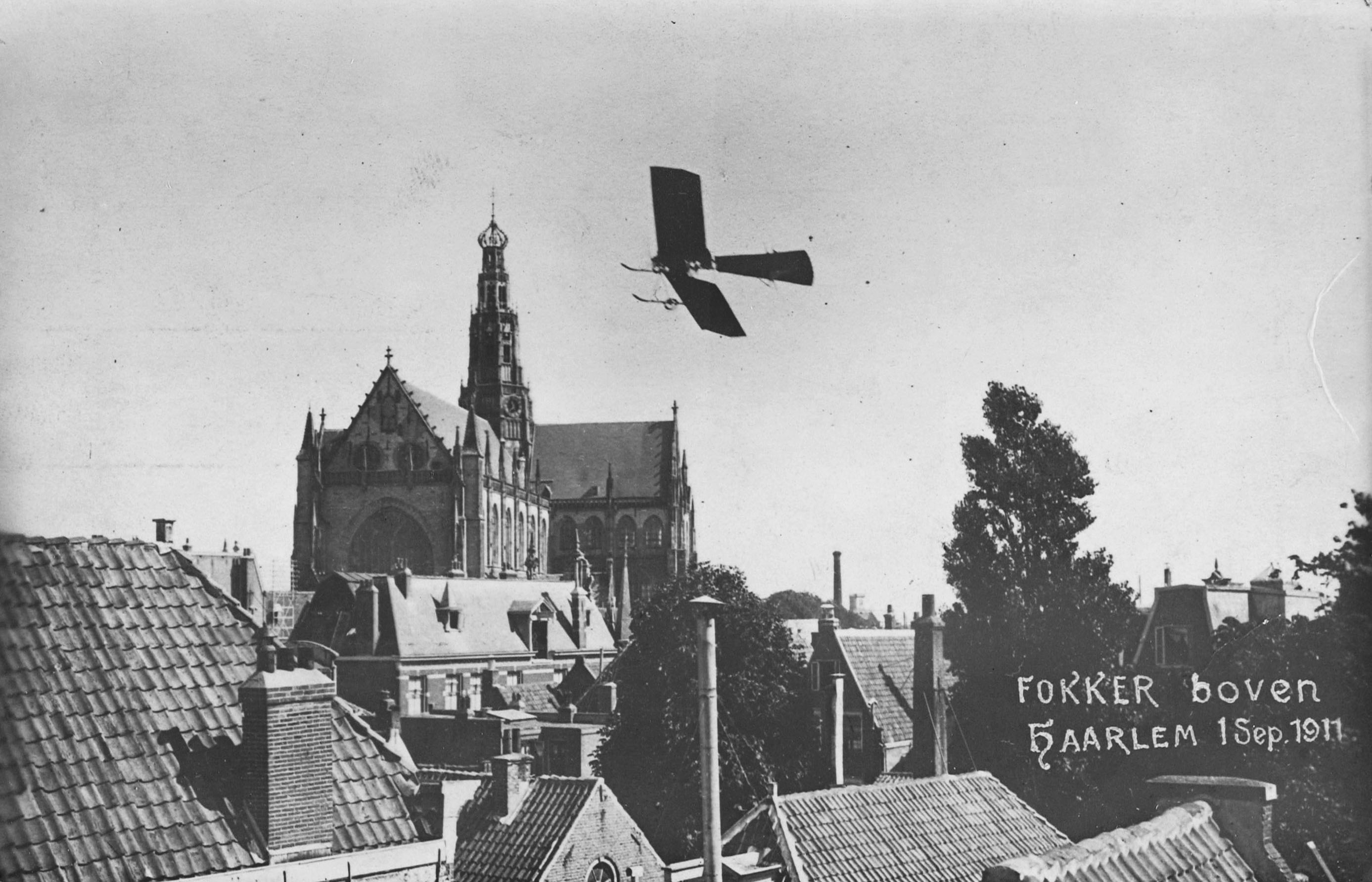
In his Spin, Fokker flies around the Grote Kerk in Haarlem on 1 September 1911

In Fokker's third model, he gained fame in his home country of the Netherlands by flying around the tower of the Grote or St.-Bavokerk, a church in his hometown Haarlem, on 1 September 1911. After this success he founded an aircraft factory and flying school near Berlin. There, the M.1 through M.4 were developed for the German Army, based on the Spin.

The M.1 was a two-seat monoplane built in small numbers as the M.3. It was first flown in 1911 and by 1913 had been transferred to military flying schools. The M.2 was a true military version of the Spin. The airplane had a 75 kW (100 hp) Argus or Mercedes engine and was capable of 97 km/h (60 mph). The ten M.2s ordered for 299,880 Marks included 10 Daimler trucks to move the aircraft with the Army, per plans of the German General Staff at the time. The M.2 was a much refined aircraft with a streamlined fuselage, first flown in 1912. The M.4 was developed from the M.3, and included a nose wheel. It did not gain further sales.

From 1912 to 1913, a total of 25 Fokker Spin-aircraft were built (including a few two-seat variants), used mostly for pilot training.

One of the last Spins was brought by Fokker to the Netherlands after World War I. It was incomplete and rebuilt in the early 1920s. During World War II, the plane was taken to an aviation museum in Berlin as a war trophy by the Germans occupying the Netherlands. After the war it was brought to Poland. Not until 1986 was it returned to the Netherlands where it was restored. A second surviving Spin was built by Fokker personnel in 1936 to commemorate the twenty-fifth anniversary of Anthony Fokker's first flight. Both of these planes are preserved at the Aviodrome aviation museum at Lelystad Airport, the Netherlands.

== Construction ==
The fuselage simply consists of two wooden beams with cross members on which the pilot is seated and on which an Argus four-cylinder water-cooled engine is mounted in the front. The radiators are placed on the side of the fuselage. The wings and tail consist of two steel tubes with bamboo ribs. The landing gear is also constructed of steel tubing. The whole structure is held together with steel wire. Later versions have a more streamlined fuselage.

== Specifications (M.2) ==
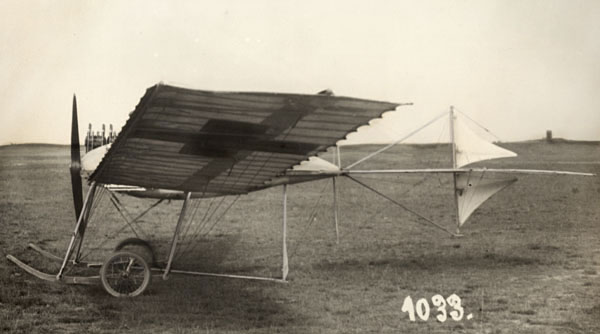
Fokker Spin, 3rd model

Data from Die deutschen Militärflugzeuge 1919-1934 : mit 143 Vierseitenrissen im Massstab 1:144

General characteristics

- Crew: 1
- Length: 8.25 m (27 ft 1 in)
- Wingspan: 13.2 m (43 ft 4 in)
- Height: 2.97 m (9 ft 9 in)
- Empty weight: 374 kg (825 lb)
- Gross weight: 574 kg (1,265 lb)
- Fuel capacity: Fuel and oil 40 kg (88 lb)
- Powerplant: 1 × Argus As I 4-cylinder water-cooled in-line piston engine, 75 kW (100 hp)

Performance

- Maximum speed: 100 km/h (62 mph, 54 kn)
- Cruise speed: 90 km/h (56 mph, 49 kn)
- Range: 120 km (75 mi, 65 nmi)
