= Fokker D.X =

Dutch interwar fighter aircraft

D.X
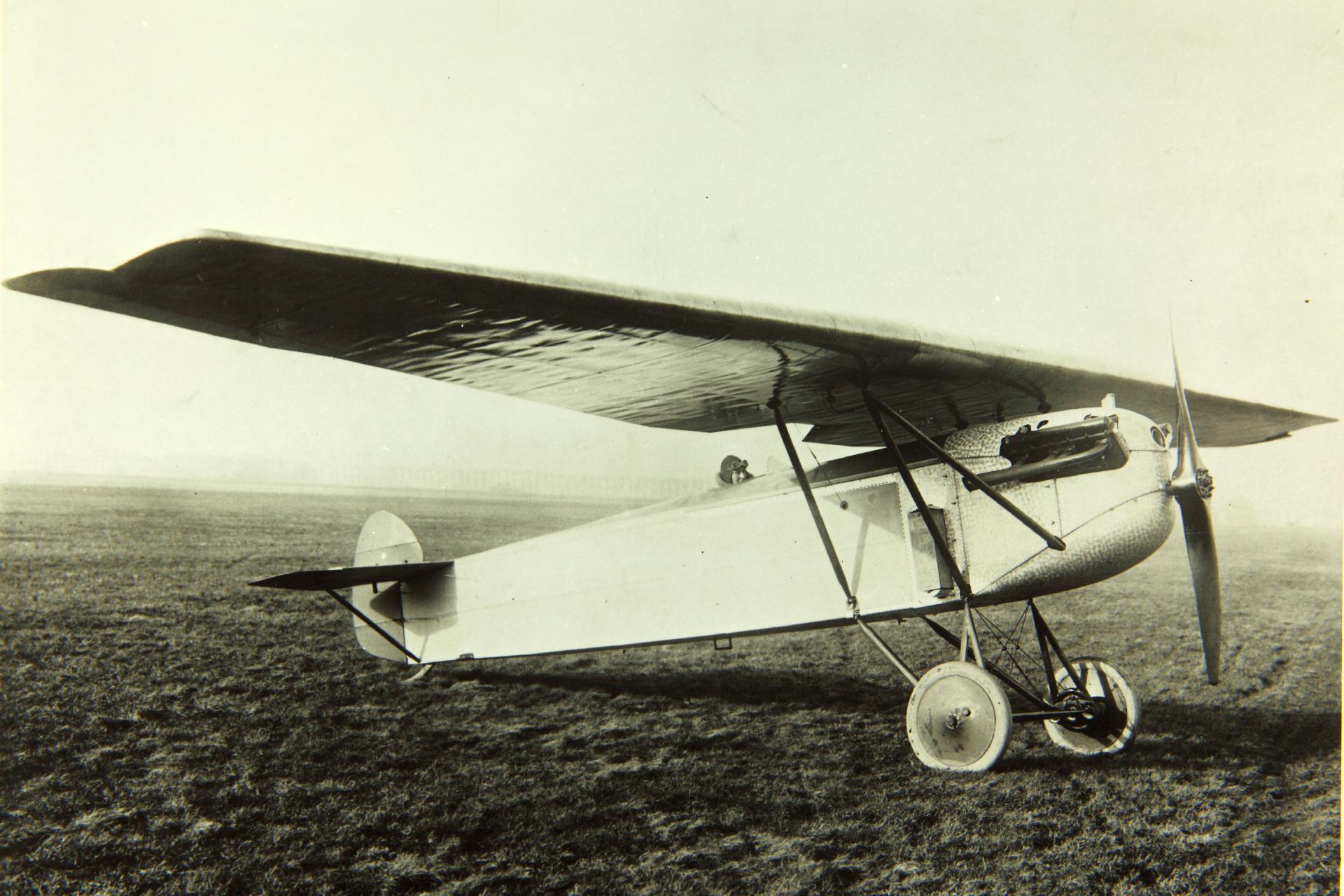

General information
- Type: Fighter
- Manufacturer: Fokker
- Designer: Reinhold Platz
- Primary users: Spanish Air Force Finnish Air Force
- Number built: 11+prototype

History
- Introduction date: 1923
- First flight: 1921
- Developed from: Fokker D.VIII

Fokker D.X (or D.10, or V.40, or V-40) was a Dutch fighter aircraft designed after World War I.

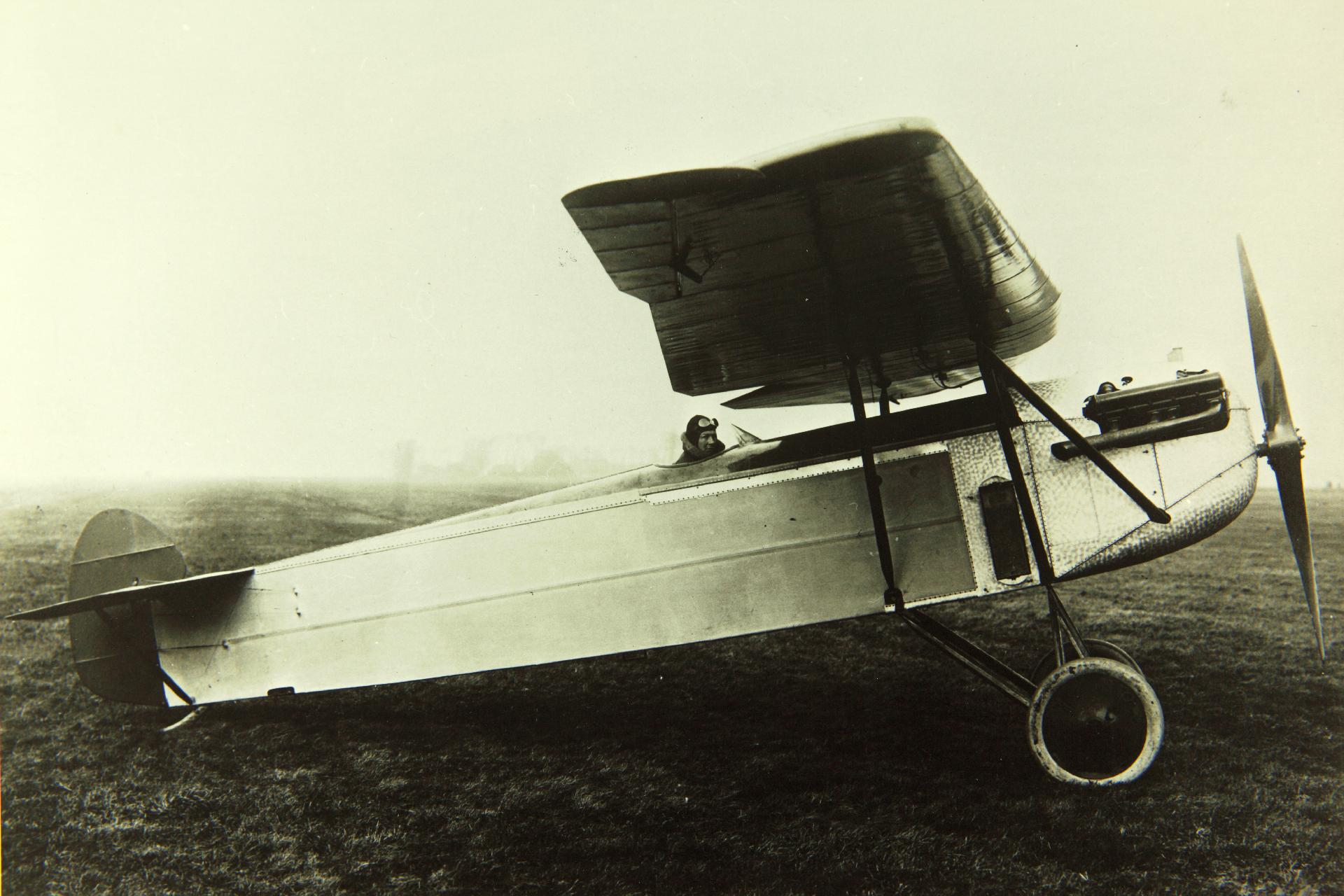
Fokker D.X

The chief designer at Fokker, Reinhold Platz, designed the Fokker D.VIII fighter in 1918. It was a parasol monoplane with cantilever wings, which was an uncommon feature of the time. Its rotary engine could only develop 82 kW (110 hp), but it had good flying qualities. 60 aircraft were manufactured in Germany.

After the war, Anthony Fokker moved his factory to the Netherlands, where production continued. The D.X was an enlarged development of the D.VIII, which saw limited success. Ten aircraft were sold to Spain and one to Finland, where it was in use 1923–24.

It was provided to US Army Air Service officials with a name of Fokker V-40 mounting the 400 horsepower Liberty 12-cylinder engine but in April 1923 was finally dissatisfied them.

== Operators ==
Spain
Spanish Air Force (10)
Finland
Finnish Air Force (1)

== Specifications (D.X) ==
Data from Thulinista Hornetiin – 75 vuotta Suomen ilmavoimien lentokoneita

General characteristics

- Crew: 1
- Length: 8 m (26 ft 3 in)
- Wingspan: 14 m (45 ft 11 in)
- Height: 2.95 m (9 ft 8 in)
- Max takeoff weight: 1,250 kg (2,756 lb)
- Powerplant: 1 × Hispano-Suiza 8Fb V-8 water-cooled piston engine, 223 kW (299 hp)
- Propellers: 2-bladed fixed-pitch propeller

Performance

- Maximum speed: 225 km/h (140 mph, 121 kn)

Armament

- Guns: 2 × 7.92 mm (.312 in) LMG 08/15 Spandau machine guns

== See also ==
Related development

- Fokker D.VIII

Related lists

- List of fighter aircraft
