= Reinhold Platz =

German aircraft designer and manufacturer

Reinhold Platz (16 January 1886 – 15 September 1966) was a German aircraft designer and manufacturer in service of the Dutch company Fokker.

Platz was hired by Fokker in 1912 as a welder. His first hands-on projects were to weld the frame parts for the Fokker Spin. Platz became the head designer at the Fokker factory in Schwerin in 1916. Platz had no higher education like Anthony Fokker, but was a man of practical knowledge. This turned the two men into a strong team, in which Fokker was able to bring forth new revolutionary ideas to aircraft design, while Platz implemented them in prototype aircraft. Platz became the head designer at the Fokker factory in Amsterdam after World War I.

Platz is now largely credited with designing the innovative Fokker D.VII fighter aircraft. Some have suggested that Platz was merely the foreman of the welding unit at Fokker, however, and that his status was raised in Weyl's book (see below) in an effort to denigrate Anthony Fokker's design achievements.

Platz was born in Cottbus and died in Ahrensburg.
