= Donald Cunnell =

Donald Charles Cunnell
- Born: 19 October 1893; Norwich, Norfolk, England
- Died: 12 July 1917 (aged 23) near Wervicq, Belgium
- Burial place: Bailleul Communal Cemetery Extension North, Bailleul, France
- Military career
- Allegiance: United Kingdom
- Branch: British Army
- Service years: 1915–1917
- Units: Hampshire Regiment; No. 20 Squadron RFC
- Conflicts: First World War

Donald Charles Cunnell (19 October 1893 – 12 July 1917) was a British First World War flying ace who was killed in action over Belgium. He is known for having shot down and wounded the Red Baron, Manfred von Richthofen.

== Early life ==
Cunnell was born on 19 October 1893 at Norwich, Norfolk, England, the son of Charles Donald Cunnell and educated at Gresham's School, Holt. He trained as an architect and served for two years in the Norfolk Officer Training Corps.

== Military career ==
In September 1914, Cunnell enlisted as a private, and soon was promoted to sergeant. On 2 November 1915, he was commissioned as a second lieutenant into the Hampshire Regiment, and saw active service on the Western Front. On 24 November 1916 he was seconded for duty with the Royal Flying Corps, and appointed a temporary flying officer.

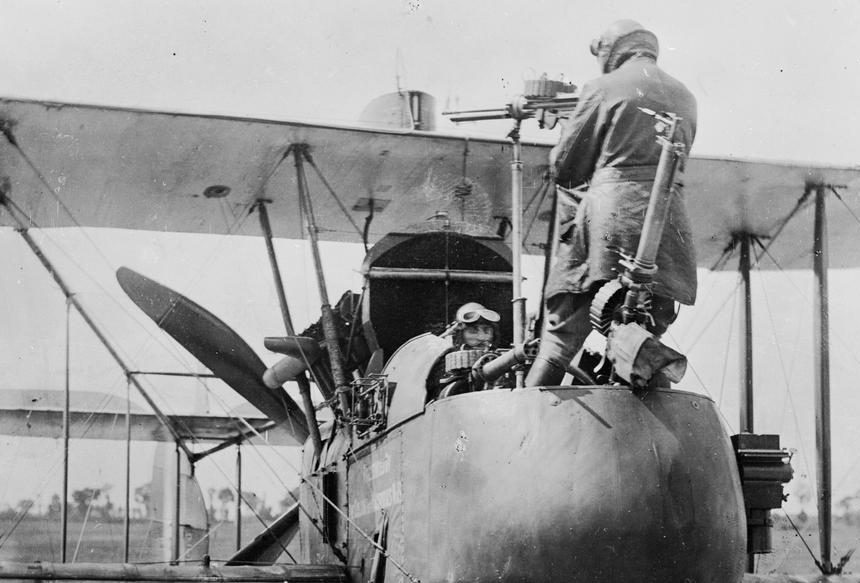
The Royal Aircraft Factory FE2d fighter

On 1 March 1917 he was promoted to lieutenant. On 14 May 1917 Cunnell was appointed a flight commander with the temporary rank of captain. Between 2 May and 11 July, Cunnell claimed nine victories (five claimed destroyed, four "out of control") flying a FE2d with No 20 Squadron.

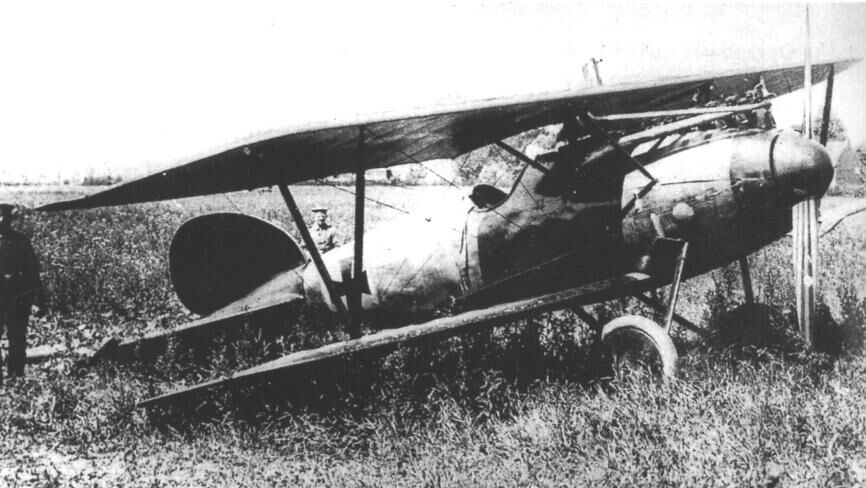
Richthofen's Albatros D.V after his forced landing

On 6 July 1917, Cunnell, flying with Second Lieutenant Albert Edward Woodbridge, was part of a patrol of six aircraft attacked by a flight of German Albatros D.Vs including one flown by Manfred von Richthofen. During the clash Richthofen was wounded in the head and forced to land near Wervicq. The victory was credited to the crew of Cunnell's A6412.

It is often falsely stated that this was the only time Richthofen was shot down in air-to-air combat, overlooking Edwin Benbow's victory over the Red Baron on 6 March 1917. However, this was the only time the Red Baron was wounded in action.

Woodbridge later described the action:

Cunnell handled the old FE for all he was worth, banking him from one side to the other, ducking dives from above and missing head-on collisions by bare margins of feet. The air was full of whizzing machines, and the noise from the full-out motors and the crackling machine guns was more than deafening ... Cunnell and I fired into four of the Albatroses from as close as thirty yards, and I saw my tracers go right into their bodies. Those four went down ... Some of them were on fire – just balls of smoke and flame – a nasty sight to see. Two of them came at us head-on, and the first one was Richthofen. There wasn't a thing on that machine that wasn't red, and how he could fly! I opened fire with the front Lewis and so did Cunnell with the side gun. Cunnell held the FE on her course and so did the pilot of the all-red scout. With our combined speeds, we approached each other at 250 miles per hour ... I kept a steady stream of lead pouring into the nose of that machine. Then the Albatros pointed her nose down suddenly and passed under us. Cunnell banked and turned. We saw the all-red plane slip into a spin. It turned over and over, round and round, completely out of control. His motor was going full on, so I figured I had at least wounded him. As his head was the only part that wasn't protected by his motor, I thought that's where he was hit.

Richthofen's subsequent medical treatment disclosed that the bullet that hit him may have come from behind. Despite Cunnell and Woodbridge's confirmed claim for this aerial victory, Richthofen may have fallen from fire from one of the other FE.2s of 20 Squadron, from being shot down by Raymond Collishaw, or even from one of Collishaw's wingmen from 'B' Flight, 10 Naval Squadron such as William Melville Alexander, Ellis Vair Reid, or Desmond Fitzgibbon.

Cunnell was killed by German anti-aircraft fire a few days later on 12 July 1917, near Wervicq, Belgium; his observer, Lt. A. G. Bill, successfully flew his fighter back to base. He was buried at the Bailleul Communal Cemetery Extension North at Bailleul, France, close to the Belgian border, in grave number III.C.263.

== War record ==
Aerial victories:

| Date | Time | Aircraft | Opponent | Location |
|---|---|---|---|---|
| 2 May 1917 | 11:15 | F.E.2d (A6431) | Albatros D.III (DESF) | Comines |
| 26 May 1917 | 10:35 | F.E.2d (A6431) | Albatros D.III (DES) | Comines–Quesnoy |
| 31 May 1917 | 19:20 | F.E.2d (A6430) | Albatros D.III (DES) | Comines |
| 5 June 1917 | 08:10 | F.E.2d (A6414) | Albatros D.V (DESF) | Coucou |
| 6 July 1917 | 10:30 | F.E.2d (A6512) | Albatros D.V (OOC) | Wervicq |
| 6 July 1917 | 10:30 | F.E.2d (A6512) | Albatros D.V (OOC) | Wervicq |
| 6 July 1917 | 10:30 | F.E.2d (A6512) | Albatros D.V (OOC) | Wervicq |
| 6 July 1917 | 10:30 | F.E.2d (A6512) | Albatros D.V (OOC) | Wervicq |
| 11 July 1917 | 14:00 | F.E.2d (A6412) | Albatros D.V (DESF) | Wervicq–Menin |

== Bibliography ==
- Guttman, Jon & Dempsey, Harry (2009). Pusher Aces of World War I. Osprey Publishing. ISBN 978-1-84603-417-6.
- Smart, Sue (2001). When Heroes Die. Breedon Books. ISBN 1-85983-256-3.
