= Desmond Fitzgibbon =

British Royal Naval Air Service flying ace

Desmond Fitzgerald Fitzgibbon
- Born: 1 November 1890; Hampstead, London, England
- Military career
- Allegiance: United Kingdom
- Branch: Royal Navy; Royal Air Force
- Service years: 1916–1919; 1921–c.1924 1939–1945
- Rank: Flight Lieutenant
- Units: No. 3 Wing RNAS; No. 10 Squadron RNAS
- Conflicts: World War I World War II
- Awards: Distinguished Service Cross

Desmond Fitzgerald Fitzgibbon (born 1 November 1890; date of death unknown) was a British flying ace who served in the Royal Naval Air Service during World War I, and was credited with eight aerial victories. He returned to serve in the RAF for a few years in the early 1920s, and again during World War II.

== Early life ==
Desmond Fitzgerald Fitzgibbon was born in Hampstead, London, on 1 November 1890, the younger son of Gerald FitzGibbon and Margaret Mary (née Matthews) of "The Lodge", Steele's Road, Hampstead.

== World War I ==
Fitzgibbon joined the Royal Naval Air Service on 28 May 1916. He received Royal Aero Club Aviator's Certificate No. 3529 after flying a Maurice Farman biplane at Royal Naval Air Station Cranwell, on 14 August 1916, and was promoted from probationary flight sub-lieutenant to flight sub-lieutenant on 11 October 1916, with seniority backdated to his date of enlistment.

Fitzgibbon was eventually posted to No. 3 Wing RNAS, based at Luxeuil-les-Bains Aerodrome, in March 1917. The unit had been created the previous year to carry out strategic bombing raids, and equipped with the Sopwith 1½ Strutter Type 9700 light bomber, but was now in the process of being run down, as its aircraft were rendered obsolete by the introduction of the Handley Page 0/100 twin-engined heavy bomber. Fitzgibbon arrived in time to take part in its final mission, a raid on Freiburg on 14 April 1917. As part of "B" Flight, he dropped his bombs on the target in the face of heavy enemy anti-aircraft fire, observing several fires on the ground. However, while heading home engine problems reduced his speed, and he lost contact with the rest of the wing, finally crossing the lines alone and landing at Ochey. No. 3 Wing was then disbanded.

Fitzgibbon was one of five pilots assigned to "C" Flight of No. 10 Squadron RNAS in early 1917, being posted there on 5 May; the four Canadians in the flight with him all became casualties or were transferred. He scored his first two victories (both shared) on 5 June 1917, flying a Sopwith Triplane. Two further victories followed on 15 June, and his fifth on the 25th. On 27 August he was appointed an acting flight-lieutenant, with seniority from 3 August. The squadron having converted to the Sopwith Camel, he scored his final three victories on 14, 26 and 27 September. On 1 October he was promoted to flight-lieutenant, and on 15 October he returned to England, and was reassigned to the Home Establishment.

He was awarded the Distinguished Service Cross, which was gazetted on 2 November 1917, his citation reading:

Distinguished Service Cross
Acting Flight-Lieutenant (now Flight-Lieutenant) Desmond Fitzgerald Fitzgibbon, RNAS.
For exceptional courage and determination in leading offensive patrols against enemy formations, although often out-numbered by them. On 14 September 1917, he and his patrol of seven machines attacked a hostile formation of eight enemy scouts. In the combat that ensued three hostile machines were brought down completely out of control, one of these by Flt.-Lieut. Fitzgibbon, while the patrol suffered no casualties. On 26 September 1917, he attacked with his patrol of eight machines fifteen hostile scouts. He himself engaged four different machines, one after the other, finally driving one down completely out of control.

=== List of aerial victories ===
Victories
No.	Date/time	Aircraft	Foe	Result	Location	Notes
1	5 June 1917 @ 0850 hours	Sopwith Triplane; Serial number N5466	Albatros C two-seater	Set afire in midair; destroyed	Wervik, Belgium	Shared with Raymond Collishaw, Gerald Ewart Nash, Ellis Vair Reid, and Gerald Nash
2	5 June 1917 @ 0900 hours	Sopwith Triplane s/n N5466	Albatros C two-seater	Driven down out of control	Northeast of Poelcapelle	Shared with Raymond Collishaw
3	15 June 1917 @ 1055 hours	Sopwith Triplane s/n N5458	Halberstadt D.II	Driven down out of control	Saint-Julien	
4	15 June 1917 @ 1740 hours	Sopwith Triplane s/n N5458	Albatros D.V	Driven down out of control	Moorslede, Belgium	
5	25 August 1917 @ 1930 hours	Sopwith Triplane s/n N5389	Albatros D.V	Driven down out of control	North of Polygon Wood, Belgium	
6	14 September 1917 @ 1630 hours	Sopwith Camel s/n B6202	Albatros D.V	Driven down out of control	Tenbrielen, Belgium	
7	26 September 1917 @ 1100 hours	Sopwith Camel s/n B6202	Albatros D.V	Driven down out of control	Westrozebeke	
8	27 September 1917 @ 1610 hours	Sopwith Camel s/n B6202	Albatros D.V	Driven down out of control	Northeast of Westrozebeke	

== Postwar career ==
Fitzgibbon was promoted to captain, being confirmed in his rank in January 1919, but on 10 April 1919, he relinquished his commission on being transferred to the unemployed list of the Royal Air Force.

He temporarily returned to RAF service two years later, being granted a short service commission with the rank of flying officer on 28 February 1921. After several years of active service, he transferred to the Reserve of Air Force Officers, finally relinquishing his commission on completion of service on 28 February 1929.

At some point he was resident in Ceylon, marrying Phyllis Muriel at the Holy Trinity Church at Nuwara Eliya, where his son Gerald Maurice Fitzgibbon was also baptised.

== World War II ==
Fitzgibbon returned to service during World War II, being commissioned as a flight lieutenant in the Administrative & Special Duties Branch of the Royal Air Force Volunteer Reserve on 1 September 1939. He was promoted to temporary squadron leader on 1 March 1942 (with seniority from 1 December 1941), and on 1 January 1945 received a mention in despatches.
