= William Melville Alexander (aviator) =

Canadian World War I flying ace

- Born: 8 November 1897; Toronto, Ontario, Canada
- Died: 4 October 1988 (aged 90); Toronto, Ontario, Canada
- Military career
- Allegiance: United Kingdom (Note: Canadian airmen were required to complete an Attestation Paper in which they declared an oath of allegiance to King George the Fifth and agreed to serve in any arm of the service for the duration of the war between Great Britain and Germany.)
- Branch: Royal Naval Air Service; Royal Air Force
- Service years: 1916–1919
- Rank: Captain
- Nickname: Mel
- Units: No. 3 (Naval) Wing RNAS; No. 10 (Naval) Squadron RNAS; No. 210 Squadron RAF
- Conflicts: World War I; Western Front
- Awards: Distinguished Service Cross

William Melville Alexander DSC (8 November 1897 – 4 October 1988) was a Canadian First World War flying ace, officially credited with 22 aerial victories.

== World War I service ==
Having turned 18 in late 1915 Alexander was keen to learn to fly, but both the Curtis and Wright Brothers flying schools were at full capacity, so he travelled to San Antonio, Texas, to enter the Stinson Flying School on 6 February 1916. He received just 3½ hours instruction in a Wright Model B before passing his flying test and was awarded Aero Club of America Certificate No. 447. He then returned to Ottawa where on 23 March 1916 he was appointed a flight sub-lieutenant (on probation) in the Royal Naval Air Service. He received further training, travelled to England, and his period of probation came to an end on 9 November 1916.

On 3 December 1916 Alexander was posted to No. 3 (Naval) Wing in France, to fly the Sopwith 1½ Strutter two-seater. However, after only four months No. 3 Wing was disbanded, and on 26 April 1917 Alexander was posted to the newly formed No. 10 (Naval) Squadron, to fly the Sopwith Triplane single-seat fighter as a part of Canadian ace Raymond Collishaw's "B" ('Black') Flight".

His first aerial victory came on 2 June 1917, shared with Flight Lieutenant Collishaw and Flight Sub-Lieutenants Ellis Reid and Gerald Nash. He gained seven more solo victories by the end of July, also being promoted flight lieutenant on 30 June.

In August 1917 No. 10 (Naval) began to receive the Sopwith Camel fighter, and Alexander gained his first victory in this type on 16 August, but next two victories in August were gained in the Triplane. On 27 August he was appointed an acting flight commander, with seniority from 3 August.

His award of the Distinguished Service Cross was gazetted on 14 September 1917. His citation read:

Flight Lieutenant (Acting Flight Commander) William Melville Alexander, RNAS.

"On 16 August 1917, he attacked at about 3,000 feet two hostile scouts, one of which, after a short combat, fell completely out of control. On 20 August 1917, while returning from patrol, he observed three enemy scouts. These he pursued until they turned to fight. One of the scouts he shot down completely out of control, and the remaining two dived away. On 21 August 1917 while on an offensive patrol, he attacked and drove down completely out of control an enemy scout, which was attacking another member of his patrol. Flight Lieutenant Alexander has at all times shown the greatest bravery and determination."

Alexander gained one more victory in a Camel on 23 September, then returned to Canada on leave from mid-October to December 1917, before returning to the front with his acting rank made substantive on 28 December. Between 23 January and 27 May Alexander gained ten more aerial victories. On 1 April 1918, the Royal Naval Air Service (RNAS) was merged with the Army's Royal Flying Corps (RFC) to form the Royal Air Force and No. 10 (Naval) Squadron RNAS was renamed No. 210 Squadron RAF. On 17 April 1918 the Commanding Officer of No. 210 Squadron recommended Alexander for a second Distinguished Service Cross, but this was not forthcoming. Alexander completed four hundred and sixty-five hours of war-time flying before he was returned to the Home Establishment in May 1918. He became Flight Commander of the Fighter Defence Flight at RAF Walmer His war time tally consisted of five aircraft destroyed, and 17 'out of control' victories, one shared.

On 23 August 1918, Alexander, then commanding a Camel flight based at Walmer, was recommended for promotion to major (a squadron commander's rank), but again was turned down. He was finally transferred to the RAF's unemployed list on 29 September 1919.

=== List of aerial victories ===
Combat record
No.	Date/Time	Aircraft/ Serial No.	Opponent	Result	Location	Notes
No. 10 (Naval) Squadron RNAS
1	2 June 1917 @ 0700–0900	Sopwith Triplane (N5487)	C	Out of control	St. Julien	Shared with Flight Lieutenant Raymond Collishaw and Flight Sub-Lieutenants Ellis Reid & Gerald Nash.
2	4 June 1917 @ 0850	Sopwith Triplane (N5487)	Albatros D.III	Out of control	North-east of Ypres	
3	6 June 1917 @ 1150	Sopwith Triplane (N5487)	Albatros D.III	Out of control	Polygon Wood	
4	6 July 1917 @ 1100	Sopwith Triplane (N5487)	Albatros D.III	Out of control	Deûlémont	
5	6 July 1917 @ 1100	Sopwith Triplane (N5487)	Albatros D.III	Out of control	Deûlémont	
6	11 July 1917 @ 2045	Sopwith Triplane (N5487)	Albatros D.V	Out of control	Polygon Wood	
7	20 July 1917 @ 0805	Sopwith Triplane (N5487)	Albatros D.V	Destroyed	Menin—Messines	
8	28 July 1917 @ 1950	Sopwith Triplane (N5487)	Albatros D.V	Out of control	Dadizeele	
9	16 August 1917 @ 0850	Sopwith Camel (N6368)	Albatros D.V	Out of control	Wervicq	
10	20 August 1917 @ 1530	Sopwith Triplane (N6302)	Albatros D.V	Out of control	Roubaix	
11	21 August 1917 @ 1830	Sopwith Triplane (N6302)	Albatros D.V	Out of control	East of Menin	
12	23 September 1917 @ 1125	Sopwith Camel (B3910)	Albatros D.V	Out of control	Houthoulst	
13	23 January 1918 @ 1450	Sopwith Camel (B6289)	Albatros D.V	Out of control	Staden	
14	6 March 1918 @ 0830	Sopwith Camel (B7215)	Albatros D.V	Out of control	South-east of Diksmuide	
15	10 March 1918 @ 1545	Sopwith Camel (B7215)	C	Destroyed	Roulers	
16	24 March 1918 @ 0920	Sopwith Camel (B7215)	Albatros D.V	Out of control	Menin—Roulers	
17	24 March 1918 @ 0920	Sopwith Camel (B7215)	Albatros D.V	Out of control	Menin—Roulers	
No. 210 Squadron RAF
18	3 April 1918 @ 1130	Sopwith Camel (B7215)	C	Destroyed	Roulers	
19	11 April 1918 @ 1515	Sopwith Camel (B7215)	C	Out of control	East of Estaires	
20	11 May 1918 @ 1925	Sopwith Camel (D3348)	Albatros D.V	Destroyed	Armentières	
21	18 May 1918 @ 2005	Sopwith Camel (D3348)	Pfalz D.III	Destroyed	Bac St. Maur	
22	27 May 1918 @ 0820	Sopwith Camel (D3348)	Pfalz D.III	Out of control	Bailleul	
