= George Leonard Trapp =

Canadian flying ace (1894–1917)

- Born: July 1894; New Westminster, British Columbia
- Died: November 12, 1917 (aged 23)
- Military career
- Allegiance: United Kingdom
- Branch: Royal Navy Air Service
- Service years: 1916–1917
- Unit: No. 10 Naval Squadron

George Leonard Trapp (July 1894 – November 12, 1917) was a Canadian flying ace during World War I.

He was born in New Westminster, British Columbia, the son of Thomas John Trapp, was educated at McGill College and joined the Royal Navy Air Service (RNAS) in 1916, serving with No. 10 Naval Squadron. He claimed his first three victories flying Sopwith Triplanes in August 1917 and two more victories in September while flying Sopwith Camels. Trapp was killed in action in November when he was shot down by Bruno Justinius of Bavarian Jasta 35. He had claimed one more victory that morning before being shot down in the afternoon.

His two brothers Stanley Valentine Trapp and Donovan Trapp also died while serving with the RNAS: Donovan was killed in action and Stanley Valentine died during a test flight. Another brother Thomas saw action at the front and returned after being seriously wounded.

Fighter pilot Raymond Collishaw married Trapp's sister Neita.
