= Gerald Ewart Nash =

- Born: 12 May 1896; Hamilton, Ontario, Canada
- Died: 10 April 1976 (aged 79); Welland, Ontario, Canada
- Military career
- Allegiance: Canada; United Kingdom
- Branch: Royal Naval Air Service; Canadian Air Force
- Rank: Flight lieutenant
- Units: No. 3 Wing RNAS; No. 10 Squadron RNAS
- Other work: Became Group Captain during World War II

Group Captain Gerald Ewart Nash (12 May 1896 - 10 April 1976) was a World War I flying ace who went on to high command during World War II.

== World War I ==
Nash joined the Royal Naval Air Service in April 1916. His original flying assignment was to 3 Wing to fly Sopwith 1½ Strutters. During Bloody April 1917, he was assigned to Raymond Collishaw's Black Flight of Sopwith Triplanes. On 21 May 1917, he opened his scorebook by destroying an Albatros D.III over Ypres Staden. On 2 June, he cooperated with Collishaw, Ellis Vair Reid, and William Melville Alexander in forcing down a German observation plane. On the 5th, Nash again joined Collishaw and Reid, as well Desmond Fitzgibbon and another pilot, in another victory; this time, they set an Albatros reconnaissance plane aflame. The next day, Nash destroyed another Albatros recon plane, and sent down two Albatros D.III's out of control. On 25 June 1917, Nash was shot down behind enemy lines in Belgium by Karl Allmenröder and became a prisoner of war. He was repatriated after war's end, and returned to Canada in 1919.

== World War II ==
Nash served as a Group Captain in the Royal Canadian Air Force during World War II. He retired in 1945.
