= John Sharman =

John Sharman may refer to:

- John Fowler (British Army officer) (John Sharman Fowler, 1864–1939), Commander British Forces in China
- John Edward Sharman (1892–1917), Canadian flying ace in World War I
- John Sharman, 1941 head of the charitable organisation Grand Order of Water Rats
