= Karl Allmenröder =

German World War I flying ace

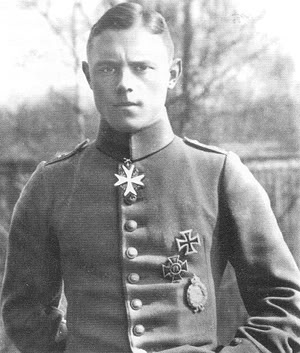
- Born: 3 May 1896; Wald, Rhine Province, German Empire
- Died: 27 June 1917 (aged 21); Zillebeke, Belgium
- Burial place: Evangelical Cemetery, Wald, Germany
- Relatives: Wilhelm Allmenröder (brother)
- Military career
- Allegiance: German Empire
- Branch: Artillery, Air Service
- Service years: 1914–17
- Rank: Leutnant (Second Lieutenant)
- Nickname: Karlchen
- Units: Field Artillery Regiments 62 & 20; Flieger-Abteilung (Artillerie) [Flier Detachment (Artillery)] 227; Jagdstaffel 11
- Commands: Jagdstaffel 11
- Awards: Kingdom of Prussia: Pour le Merite; Royal House Order of Hohenzollern; Iron Cross First Class; Grand Duchy of Oldenburg: Friedrich-August Cross; Kingdom of Bavaria: Militar Kronen Orden (posthumous)

Leutnant Karl Allmenröder (3 May 1896 – 27 June 1917) was a German World War I flying ace credited with 30 aerial victories. The medical student son of a preacher father was seasoned in the trenches as an 18-year-old artilleryman in the early days of the First World War, earning promotion via battlefield commission to Leutnant on 30 March 1915. After transferring to aviation and serving some time as an artillery spotter in two-seater reconnaissance airplanes, he transferred to flying fighter aircraft with Jagdstaffel 11 in November 1916. As Manfred von Richthofen's protege, Karl Allmenröder scored the first of his 30 confirmed victories on 16 February 1917. Flying a scarlet Albatros D.III trimmed out with white nose and elevators, Allmenröder would score a constant string of aerial victories until 26 June 1917, the day before his death. On 27 June 1917, Karl Allmenröder was shot down near Zillebeke, Belgium. His posthumous legacy of patriotic courage would later be abused as propaganda by the Nazis.

== Early life and ground service ==
Karl Allmenröder was born in Wald, Rhine Province, on 3 May 1896, the son of a Lutheran minister. He was interested in the practice of medicine and was a medical student in Marburg. His reputation became one of a quiet, amiable, and dutiful young man.

Allmenröder was only 18 when the war began. He became an artilleryman, joining Field Artillery Regiment 62 for training, and being transferred to Field Artillery Regiment 20 for duty. In January 1915, he returned to Field Artillery Regiment 62. While serving in Poland fighting against the Imperial Russian Army, he was awarded the Iron Cross Second Class in March, 1915. He also was commissioned to leutnant on 30 March 1915. He was awarded the Friedrich-August Cross First Class in August 1915.

== Aerial service ==
Brothers Karl and Wilhelm Allmenröder transferred to Die Fliegertruppe (Imperial German Air Service) on 16 March 1916. (Note: Wilhelm also became a fighter pilot, scoring two victories flying for Jagdstaffel 11 before being seriously wounded and medically discharged.) Karl Allmenröder was sent for training at Halberstadt. He flew two-seaters as an artillery spotter in Flieger-Abteilung (Artillerie) [Flier Detachment (Artillery)] 227 before joining Jagdstaffel 11 in November 1916. After Manfred von Richthofen assumed command in January, 1917, Jagdstaffel 11 became one of the premier fighter squadrons of the German military. Allmenröder's career as a fighter ace was a short but spectacular string of single and double victories. He achieved his victories flying an Albatros D.III in the squadron's scarlet livery, with his personal markings of white nose and elevators. The Red Baron often chose Allmenröder as a wingman.

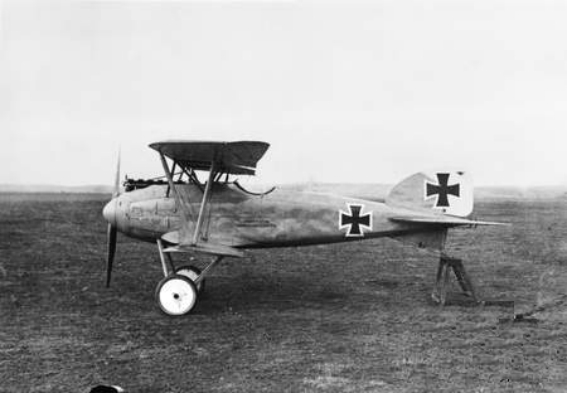
Karl Allmenröder's Albatros D.III fighter was painted red and white.

Allmenröder claimed his first victim, a BE.2c from No. 16 Squadron RFC at noon on 17 February 1917. He scored four more victories the following month, becoming an ace on 30 March. On 24 March 1917, he was awarded the Iron Cross First Class for his valor.

He had achieved nine victories by the end of April 1917. Then, in May, he shot down 13 more enemy airplanes.

On 13 May, with his victory list at 11, he was deputed as the squadron commander while Richthofen was on leave. Allmenröder shot down two British machines that day, for victories 12 and 13. The German ace continued to inflict casualties on the Royal Flying Corps throughout the next 11 days, shooting down five enemy aircraft. On 25 May, Allmenröder shot down a British Nieuport 23 on his morning flight and a DH.4 at 20:45 hours, driving his victory total to 20. (Note: At this stage of the war, the twentieth victory made an ace eligible for the prestigious Pour le Merite.) Also, at some point on that day, he was slightly wounded in combat. The wound did not prevent him shooting down New Zealand ace Captain Alan Scott on 28 May 1917.

On 6 June 1917, Allmenröder was awarded the Knight's Cross of the Royal Hohenzollern House Order and, on 14 June, he received the German Empire's most prestigious award, the Prussian Pour le Mérite. The following day, the man who had appointed him acting commanding officer, Manfred von Richthofen, returned from leave and resumed command until the 23rd.

His 29th, and penultimate victory, was scored on 25 June against Canadian ace Flight Lieutenant Gerald Ewart Nash, who became a prisoner of war. Allmenröder had succeeded to permanent command of Jagdstaffel 11 on that day, when von Richthofen had been promoted to command of Germany's first fighter wing, Jagdgeschwader 1, commonly called "The Flying Circus".

== Killed in action ==
The end of June 1917 saw Jagdstaffel 11 in frequent clashes with the opposing Canadian and British pilots of the Royal Naval Air Service. On the 24th, Allmenröder killed Naval 10's Robert Saunders in his Sopwith Triplane on a morning mission. The evening of the next day, Canadian ace Gerald Ewart Nash pounced on Allmenröder; after an epic dogfight, Nash was shot down and crashed behind German lines. On 26 June, Allmenröder shot down a Nieuport for his 30th victory.

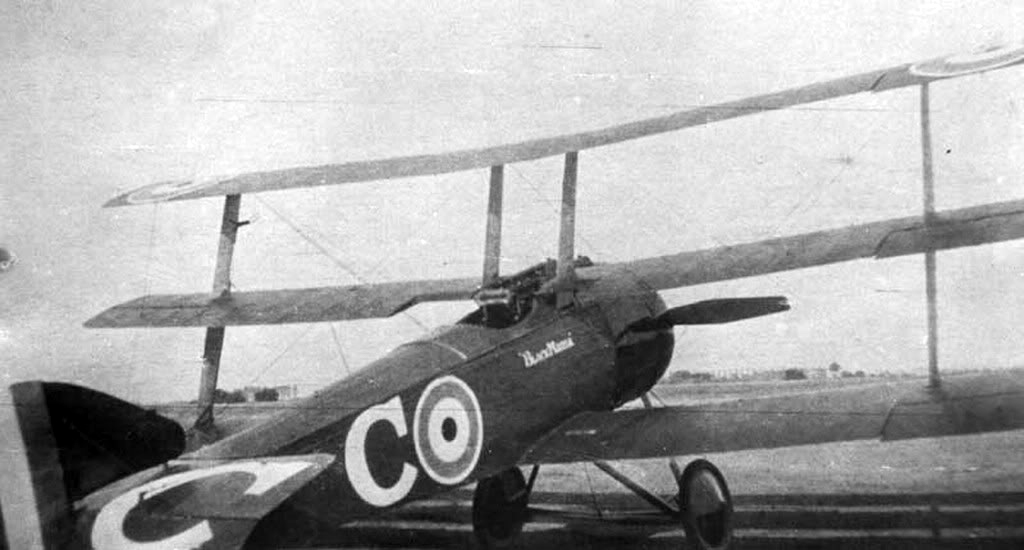
Collishaw's Sopwith Triplane, 'Black Maria', 1917.

On 27 June, Allmenröder split his force into a trio flying at medium height as a decoy while another three Germans lurked well above. A Naval 10 evening patrol fell for the trap, diving on the bait trio. As the Sopwith Triplanes dived to the attack, the higher German trio swooped down on them. Raymond Collishaw was leading the British assault. When he realized the second force of Germans was on his tail, Collishaw took a hasty long-range snapshot at a lower level Albatros D.V, only to find himself embroiled in a dogfight with the Germans attacking his rear. The shot-at German was seen to crash by other British pilots. It has been suggested that this Albatros was Allmenröder; however, Allmenröder was reportedly killed eight hours prior to that. Another possibility presents, that it was antiaircraft fire brought down the German ace that morning. In any case, German infantry retrieved Allmenröder's body the night of 27/28 June. On Thursday, 28 June, Nash in his hospital bed could hear church bells chiming; his guard told him the funeral bells rang for Allmenröder.

Karl Allmenröder was interred at the Evangelical Lutheran Cemetery in Wald. Manfred von Richthofen attended the services to honor his fallen friend.

== Legacy ==
Karl Allmenröder's legacy of valor was later used by the Nazis for propaganda purposes. For this reason, streets named after him have been renamed since the fall of the Third Reich, and Karl Allmenröder goes unhonored in his hometown.

== Decorations and awards ==
- Pour le Merite (14 June 1917)
- Knights Cross of the Royal House Order of Hohenzollern (6 June 1917)
- Iron Cross, 1st and 2nd class
- Friedrich August Cross, 1st and 2nd class (Grand Duchy of Oldenburg, 20 July 1917)
- Military Merit Order (Bavaria)
- Pilot's Badge German Empire

== Sources ==
- Norman Franks, Frank W. Bailey, Russell Guest (1993). Above the Lines: The Aces and Fighter Units of the German Air Service, Naval Air Service and Flanders Marine Corps, 1914–1918. London UK, Grub Street Publishing. ISBN 978-0-948817-73-1.
- Norman Franks. Albatros Aces of World War 1 (2000). Oxford UK, Osprey Publishing. ISBN 978-1-85532-960-7.
- Norman Franks. Sopwith Triplane Aces of World War 1 (2004). Oxford UK, Osprey Publishing, 2004. ISBN 9781841767284
- Roger Gunn. Raymond Collishaw and the Black Flight (2013). Ontario, Canada, Dundurn Press. ISBN 978-1459706606
