= John Edward Sharman =

Canadian World War I flying ace

John Edward Sharman, DSC and Bar and Croix de Guerre (11 September 1892 – 22 July 1917) was a Canadian flying ace in World War I credited with eight victories.

== Early life ==
Sharman was born in Oak Lake, Manitoba, to Thomas Higgins Sharman and Frances A. Sharman. He was the oldest child in his family, followed by his sister Beverly and his brother Thomas. He attended university in Toronto, where he studied to become a mining engineer. His father had served in the 90th Winnipeg Rifles during the North-West Rebellion of 1885 and then as a member of the militia with the 12th Manitoba Dragoons.

== World War I ==
Sharman joined the Royal Naval Air Service on 3 February 1916 and served with 3 Wing until its disbandment in April 1917. Flying Sopwith 1½ Strutter aircraft, he participated in at least twenty-nine raids and claimed one enemy aircraft destroyed. Sharman was cited by the French General Castelnau for services in eleven of these raids, notably two raids on the same day on Freiburg and was awarded the Croix de guerre.

From 1 May 1917, Sharman was posted to form part of the nucleus of 10(N) Squadron, flying Sopwith Triplanes; his flight commander was the notable Canadian ace Raymond Collishaw. In June and July 1917, Sharman claimed seven victories and became a flight commander on 9 July 1917.

On 22 July 1917, Sharman and the rest of C Flight set off for a morning patrol at around 0725 hrs. His flight was patrolling the area between Ypres and Messines when they encountered scouts from JG1. As he engaged the first aircraft, his Triplane suffered a direct hit from anti-aircraft fire, probably from Flak Batterie 503. John Sharman is commemorated on the Arras Memorial to the Missing. During the same dogfight, FLt J. Page was shot down and killed by Ltn Otto Brauneck. They were both shot down in the same area around Comines-Warneton, Belgium. Sharman and Page are buried side by side at Pont-Du-Hem Military Cemetery, La Gorgue, France. Sharman had no offspring.
