= Great War Display Team =

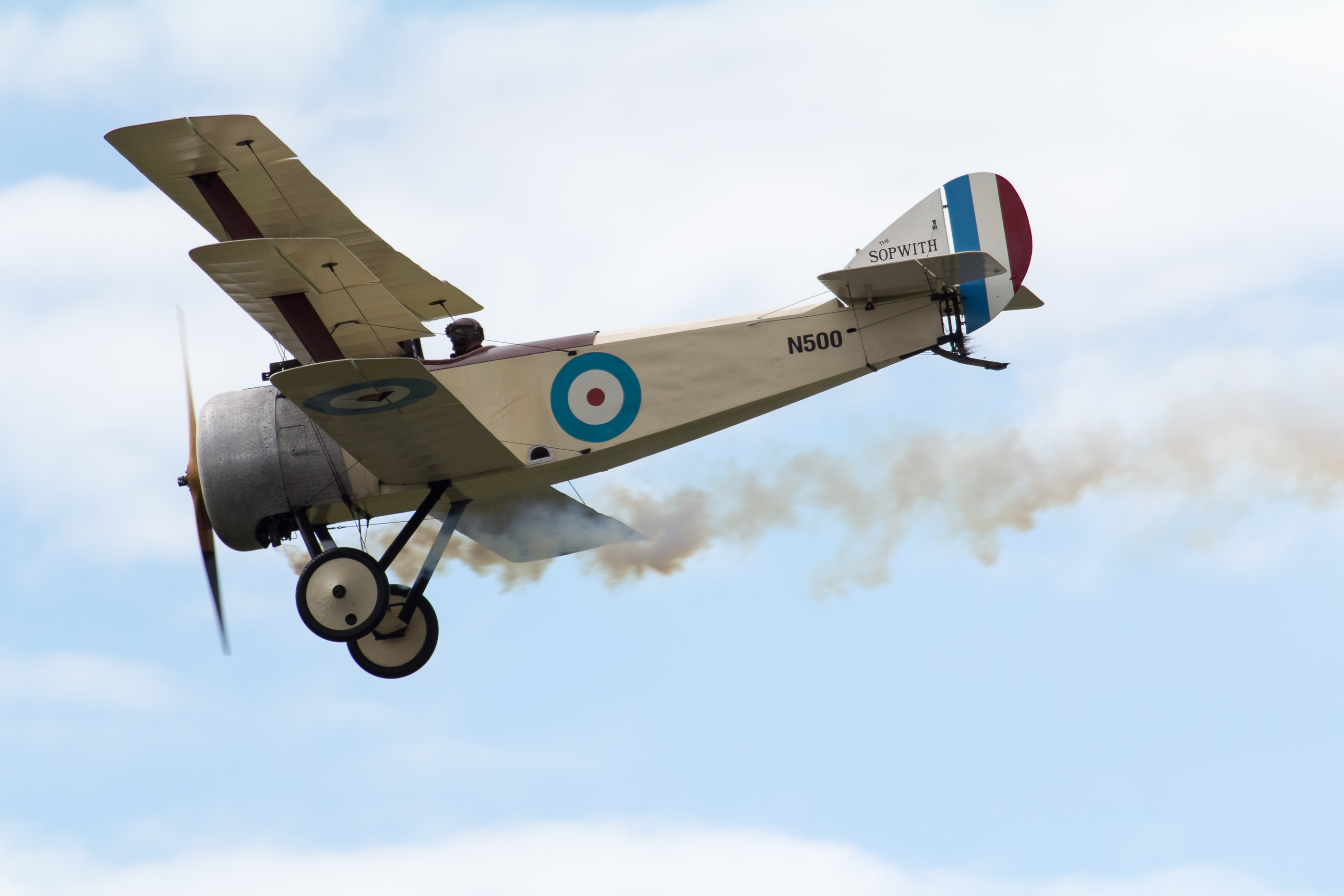
GWDT replica Sopwith Triplane at the 2016 Farnborough Airshow

The Great War Display Team (GWDT) started out in 1988 and was originally called The Wombats. It was an ad-hoc collection of aircraft including five SE5as, two Fokker Dr.Is and a Fokker D7, many of them flown by their builders, and appeared that year at the Biggin Hill Air Show. 2014 was the 27th anniversary of the Team's formation and two of the original members, Des Biggs and Doug Gregory, were still flying with the Team until 2012 and Doug flew his SE5a in January 2013 to celebrate his 90th Birthday.

Over the years the aircraft and pilots changed frequently. Robin Bowes flew his red Fokker Dr1 for several seasons and Nick O'Brien flew the black Fokker Dr1 for many years. Ernie Hoblyn joined in 1997 with the Sopwith Triplane he had built, which flies now in the ownership of Gordon Brander. The following year John Day and Bob Gauld-Galliers joined, flying the Nieuport 17 they had built and also the Junkers CL1 they had converted. John extended the types in 2006 when he finished building his Fokker Dr1 and that joined the Team as well. Following John's death his Dr1 was bought by Bruce Dickinson and still flies with the Team in company with Peter Bond's Dr1 as well; there aren't many places you can see three triplanes flying together. The SE5as and their pilots changed frequently, with Dave Linney and Vic Lockwood, the current pilots, joining in 2007. The two Junkers CL1s are flown by regular pilot Richie Piper and the other CL1 by either Francis Donaldson or Alex Truman. Matthew Boddington's R.A.F. BE2c joined in 2013.

The GWDT have been seen at many large and small airshows in the UK and abroad, including Duxford Air Show, Biggin Hill, Waddington, Farnborough Airshow, Cosford, Shoreham and Fairford and as far afield as Portrush in Ireland and La Ferté-Alais Air Show in France. They have also performed a number of important flypasts such as for the funeral of Henry Allingham in 2009.

The GWDT currently has five different types of aircraft available to fly, with nine aircraft in total. The GWDT looking to expand to a ten or even eleven aircraft display in 2015.
