= Raymond Collishaw =

Canadian fighter pilot and commanding officer who served in the Royal Naval Air Service

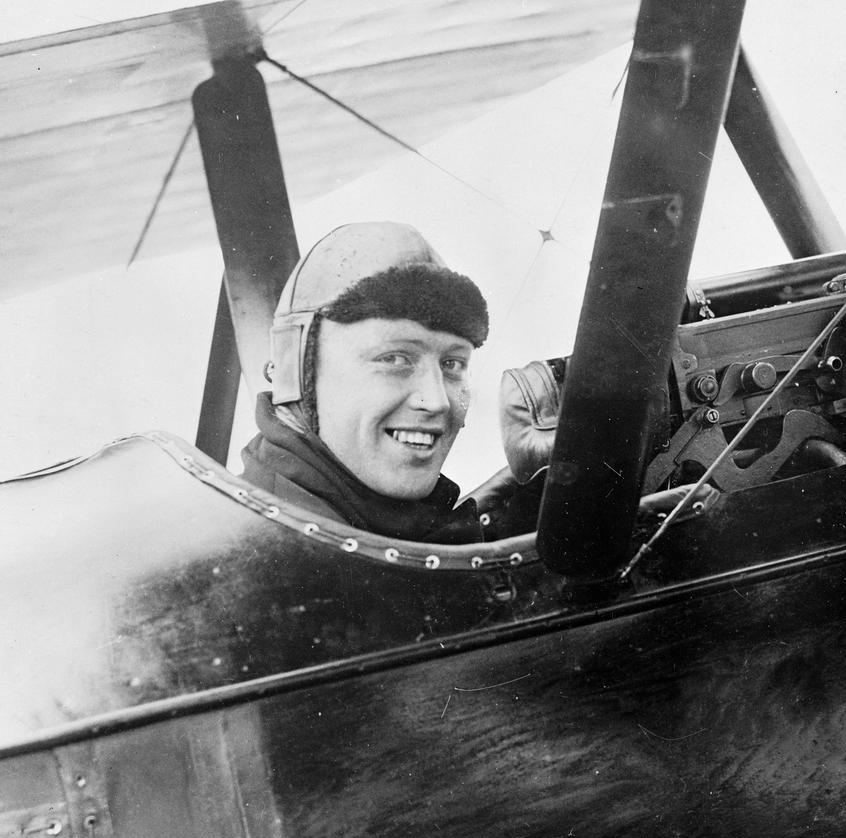
- Collishaw in the cockpit, c. 1918
- Born: 22 November 1893; Nanaimo, British Columbia
- Died: 28 September 1976 (aged 82); West Vancouver, British Columbia
- Relatives: George Leonard Trapp (brother-in-law)
- Military career
- Allegiance: United Kingdom
- Branch: Royal Naval Air Service (1915–18); Royal Air Force (1918–43)
- Service years: 1915–1943
- Rank: Air Vice Marshal
- Nickname: "Collie"
- Commands: No. 14 Group (1942–43); No. 204 Group (1941); No. 202 Group (1939–41); Egypt Group (1939); RAF Heliopolis (1936–39); No. 5 Wing (1935–36); RAF Upper Heyford (1935); RAF Bircham Newton (1932–35); No. 23 Squadron (1925–27); No. 41 Squadron (1923–24); No. 30 Squadron (1921–23); No. 47 Squadron (1919–20); No. 3 Squadron RNAS (1918)
- Conflicts: First World War; Russian Civil War; Second World War
- Awards: Companion of the Order of the Bath; Distinguished Service Order & Bar; Officer of the Order of the British Empire; Distinguished Service Cross; Distinguished Flying Cross; Mentioned in Despatches (4); Order of St. Anna, 2nd Class with Swords (Russia); Croix de guerre (France)

Raymond Collishaw, CB, DSO & Bar, OBE, DSC, DFC (22 November 1893 – 28 September 1976) was a distinguished Canadian fighter pilot, squadron leader, and commanding officer who served in the Royal Naval Air Service (RNAS) and later the Royal Air Force (RAF). He was the highest scoring RNAS flying ace and the second highest scoring Canadian pilot of the First World War. He was noted as a great leader in the air, leading many of his own formations into battle. After the Great War, he became a permanent commissioned officer in the RAF, seeing action against the Bolsheviks in 1919–20, and subsequently commanding various Air Service detachments. During the Second World War, he commanded No. 204 Group (which later became the Desert Air Force) in North Africa, achieving great success against the numerically and technologically superior Italian Air Force. He was retired in 1943.

== Early life ==
Raymond Collishaw was born in Nanaimo, British Columbia, Canada, on 22 November 1893. His father was John Edward Collishaw from Wrexham, Wales, and his mother Sarah "Sadie" Jones from Newport, Wales, but raised in Pantygog, Garw Valley. He was brought up in Nanaimo, though some of his schooling took place in Victoria, British Columbia and Oakland, California, due to his father's occasional pursuit of gold mining.

In 1908, at the age of 15, thanks to his father's connection, Collishaw joined the Canadian Fisheries Protection Services as a cabin boy. He was a lower class sailor on board the Alcedo. He would continue working on ships and the coast for the next seven years – working his way up to First Officer, and in 1914, transferring to the Fispa. He was aboard when it sailed into the Arctic Circle in search of the Stefansson expedition – too late to rescue the Karluk.

== First World War ==
=== Training ===
When war broke out in 1914, Collishaw's first idea was to join the Royal Navy, but did not hear from them for some time. Toward the end of 1915, Collishaw heard that the Royal Naval Air Service was hiring, and so he applied to them instead, and attended flight training (ground school and dual instruction) at the Curtiss Aviation School in Toronto (at his own expense). He qualified as a probationary pilot in January 1916 and crossed the Atlantic on the Adriatic. His first posting was to the naval air station at Redcar, where he completed his pilot training, flying the Caudron G.3; his first solo taking place 16 June 1916. After attending the Gunnery School at Eastchurch, he was confirmed as a full flight sub-lieutenant.

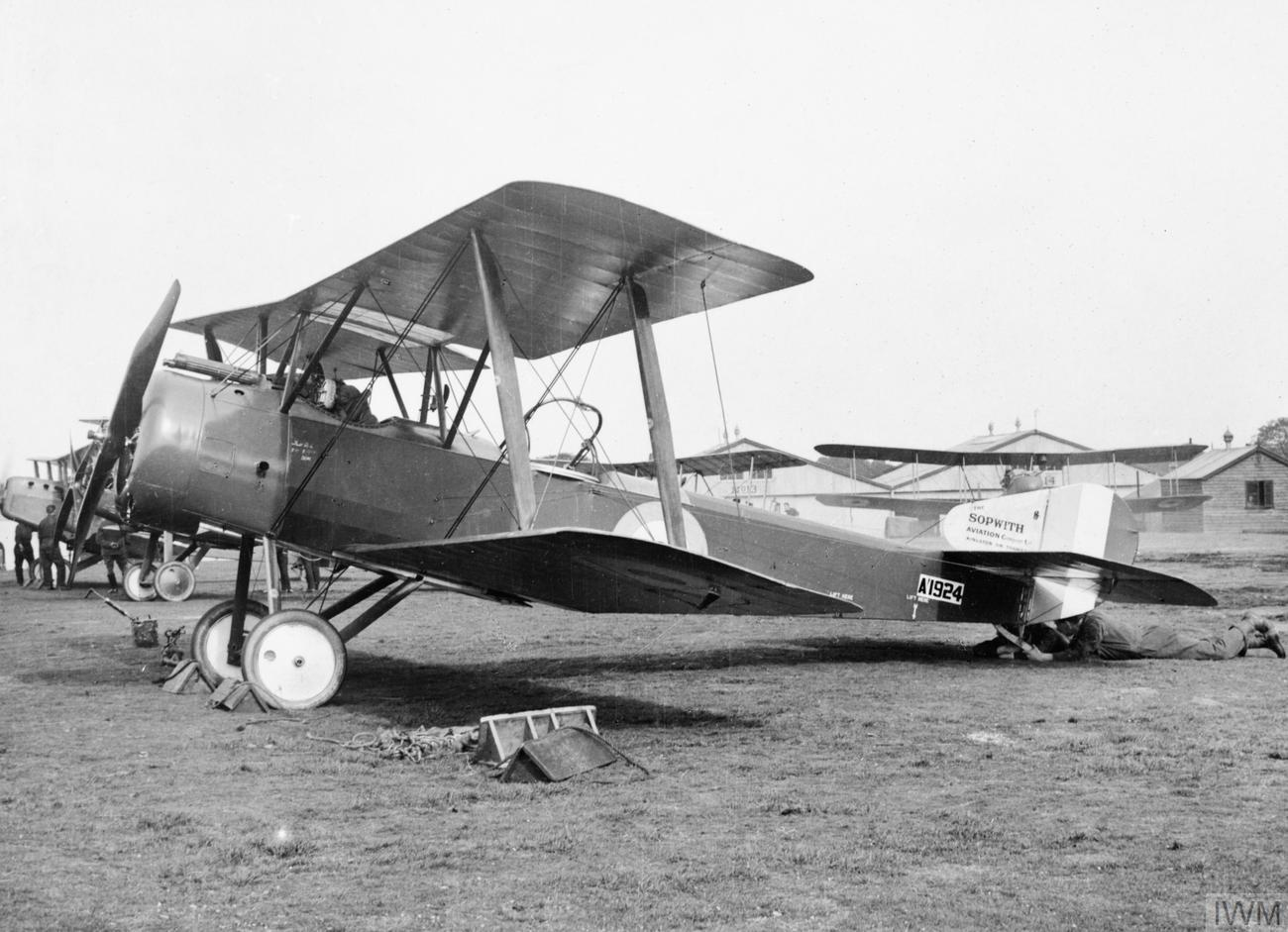
A Sopwith 1½ Strutter of No.70 Squadron RFC

=== RNAS 3 Wing ===
On 2 August 1916 Collishaw was deployed to his first operational posting, joining the RNAS's 3rd Wing. The wing was operating out of Luxeuil, France and supporting the French 4th bombardment group, flying the British Sopwith 1½ Strutter. Some of the Sopwiths were equipped as bombers, while others were configured as two-seat fighters. Collishaw found these new aircraft "a revelation" to fly (compared to his trainer aircraft). His initial sorties were with the "fighter" Strutter configuration – which he noted, "doubtless influenced significantly my subsequent air force career."

Collishaw's first encounter with a German aircraft was while flying escort duty on 3 Wing's first large-scale raid into Germany, against the Mauser Rifle Factory at Oberndorf, on 12 October 1916. The raid consisted of 27 aircraft from both British and French squadrons, and had multiple flights at different altitudes. Collishaw's was nearly at their target when they were attacked by three German Fokker D.IIIs. One of the Fokkers, flown by a Sgt. Hanstien, carried out effective attacks against two Collishaw's wing-mates on either side of him. Collishaw dived and fired, having Hanstein in his sights, but Hanstein then quickly evaded with a climbing maneuver. Collishaw's engine revved too high in the dive, shearing a wire and becoming under-powered, requiring him to return to base. Collishaw noted that while a significant event, the Oberndorf raid was of questionable success given the limited known target damage and allied aircraft losses, without any aircraft losses from the German side. The German pilots on-scene that day were quite experienced, and included the then-NCO Ernst Udet.

Collishaw's first confirmed victories occurred on 2 October, while he was ferrying a new Strutter from Wing Headquarters (at Luxeuil) to his squadron's new forward base (at Ochey, France) alone (without an observer). Six German scouts spotted him and dived across the lines. As Collishaw recounted:

The affair opened with a stream of bullets that went right into my goggles, sending powdered glass into my eyes. I was hardly able to see at all and could do little more than fling my 1½ Strutter about, hoping that it would hang together in one piece. How I wished that I had [my observer, gunlayer] Portsmouth with me, to protect my tail! My attackers got to the westward of me and although I did not realize it at the moment the seven of us gradually drifted farther and farther to the east as I turned away from their attacks. I also lost altitude, for I went into a series of dives, trying to escape their fire. After some time I was able to see a little better although my eyes hurt dreadfully, and I realized that I was down almost to ground level. One of the German pilots came down in a steep dive, firing all the while, and he must have been so intent on trying to line me up in his sights that he forgot all about his altitude. He pulled up suddenly but he had left it too late and he went in, smashing into a tree. Whether he was killed, badly injured, or merely walked away cursing I never knew and I certainly didn't have time to worry about it then. I managed to get one of the Germans in line and sent several bursts which seemed to go right into the area of the engine and the cockpit. He went down for a landing but again, whether he made it safely, I don't know. Finally, after what seemed an eternity, there was no more gunfire and I realized that the remaining scouts had left, possibly because they were running low on fuel...

Collishaw then attempted to return to allied lines, but had become disoriented. He couldn't make out his compass, but based on the position of the sun, he flew in what he presumed was the correct direction, gaining altitude and flying for what seemed to him to be a long time. Finally he spotted an aerodrome, and so he went in for a landing.

... [I was] feeling much relieved that my troubles were over and I would be able to have my eyes looked to. I put the 1½ Strutter down for what I thought was a very creditable langing after all I had been through and began taxiing towards a number of hangars in front of which stood a line of aircraft. Something about the machines struck me as odd but it was not until I got quite close to them that I understood why. Each one bore the Iron Cross markings of the German air force and I had put down at a German field! Fortunately my engine was still turning over and I opened it up, just being able to get off the ground and clear a pair of small trees on the edge of the field.

Collishaw again flew for a long time, making sure to cross the trenches this time, and finally landed at a French aerodrome, 70 miles northwest of his intended destination. He received medical treatment for his eyes and returned to his unit.

3 Wing participated in a number of larger air raids on targets deep into German territory in November and December. Collishaw's usual post was as a "fighter" support, and in this capacity he had a few engagements, but with no conclusive outcomes. On 23 January 1917, returning from a wing raid at the blast furnaces at Burbach, he had a "particularly desperate" encounter with a Fokker D.III, and he was forced down on the allied side near Nancy. The next day, in recognition for his participation in the many raids of 3 Wing, he was informed he had been awarded the French Croix de Guerre.

=== No. 3 Naval Squadron ===
In February 1917, Collishaw was posted to No. 3 Naval Squadron, which had just been established at the beginning of the month and was operating in direct support of the army and RFC at Vert Galand near Somme plain, and equipped with the then-somewhat-dated Sopwith Pups. The squadron, though British, was a majority Canadian outfit at the time in terms of pilot membership. One thing Collishaw noticed was that the pace of missions had steeply increased: instead of flying raids every week or two, as had been done at 3 Wing, at Naval 3, pilots could expect one or more patrols every day, and rarely without some sort of enemy encounter. In addition, the squadron was within operational distance of some of the best German air units, including Jasta 11. Thankfully, as Collishaw noted, "many of the German pilots who flew the new Albatros and Halberstadt fighters seemed to be inexperienced and unable to get the most out of their machines." Collishaw had a number of combats while out on frequent patrols over the ensuing two months, but suffered regular frustrations due to gun and engine malfunctions. Still, he added two to his tally before suffering another incident where, in combat at high altitude, bullets once again hit his goggles, and in response he threw off his entire face-mask, causing his face to become badly swollen by frostbite. This required him to return to England for a few weeks on sick leave.

=== No. 10 Naval Squadron ===
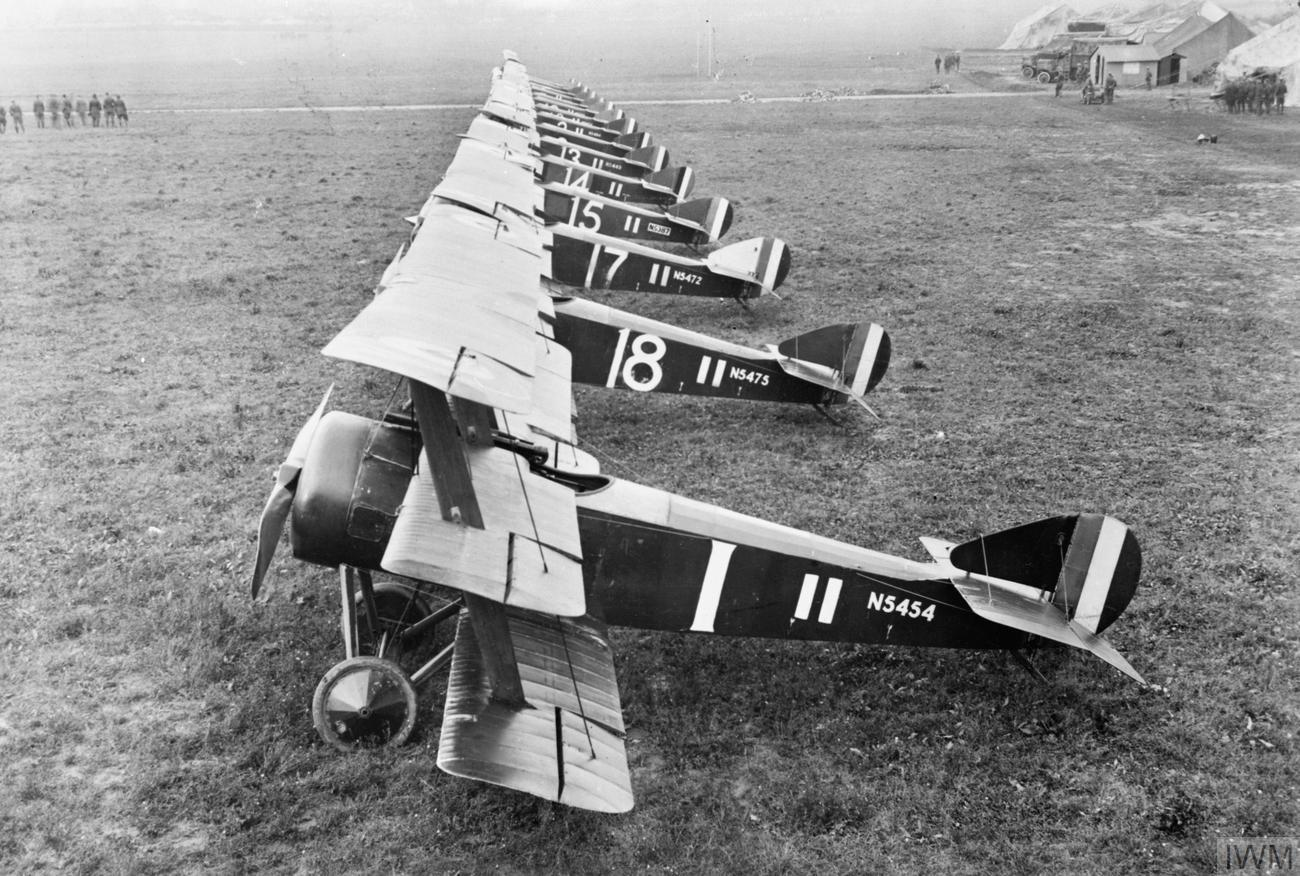
Triplanes of No. 10 Naval Squadron at Bailleul, France.

When Collishaw returned to service in late April, he was posted to No. 10 Naval Squadron as a flight commander. Once again, Collishaw discovered that the squadron was mainly Canadian by composition. Naval 10 was slowly being equipped with the new, fast-climbing and maneuverable Sopwith Triplane, and Collishaw found the aircraft "delightful", though still wished for a second forward-firing Vickers machine gun. (Collishaw eventually received one of six experimental Triplanes with two synchronized Vickers guns, along with a 130HP Clerget engine.) He had his first combat in a Triplane on 28 April, firing on a two-seater in the morning (but foiled by a gun jam), and then later in the day attacking four German fighters (while covering a disabled seaplane off Nieuport) and possibly surprising them with its performance. He swirled onto the tail of one of them, and firing a few bursts, caused it to break-up mid-air. The other Germans then broke off. This was Collishaw's 5th victory, making him an "ace". He had another victory on 30 April, and on 10 May, downed his first opponent in flames. Collishaw again noted a jump in the number of daily sorties being flown, usually 2–4 per day, and sometimes more.

By the middle of May, the Royal Flying Corps was badly in need of reinforcements. This was mainly due to the after-effects of Bloody April, but also because of preparations for a new offensive at Messines. Naval 10 had been earmarked as a unit to offer this direct support, a fact the squadron commander and pilots of the squadron had known for some time. Naval 10 shifted to a new aerodrome at Droglandt.

=== The Black Flight ===
Collishaw's "B" Flight of Naval 10 would initially be composed entirely of Canadians, and would later be nicknamed the "Black Flight", owing to the flight's black (front) engine cowling and wheel covers (to contrast with the red and blue of Naval 10's "A" and "B" Flights, respectively). In addition, the flight decided to give their machines names in large (3-inch) white letters on either side near the cockpit. Ellis Vair Reid, of Toronto, flew Black Roger; John Edward Sharman, of Winnipeg, flew Black Death; Gerald "Gerry" Ewart Nash, of Stoney Creek, flew Black Sheep; Marcus Alexander, of Toronto, flew Black Prince; and Collishaw chose Black Maria (a reference to a police van). During their first two months they claimed a record 84 German aircraft destroyed or driven down – which, strangely enough, brought Collishaw and the unit no wide publicity, though garnered a great deal of renown among their German opponents in the area. Collishaw later claimed that this was because officials in the regular Royal Flying Corps were loath to give credit to naval pilots. In his autobiography, Collishaw noted that they did not always fly together, and operational conditions demanded that pilots of the various flights be available to sub-in on an as-needed basis – and on different machines (which were serviced after about 30 flying hours). There were only a relatively small number of occasions where the full-strength "original" flight were in the field. He maintained that the squadron as a whole should be given credit in terms of whatever legend exists of the "Black Flight".

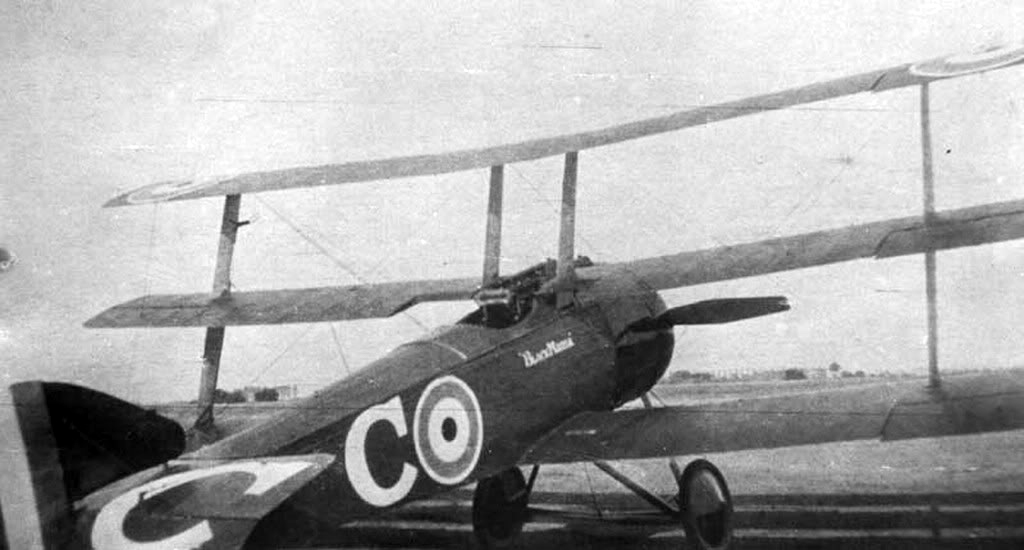
Collishaw's Sopwith Triplane, 'Black Maria', 1917.

The original group's first (uneventful) flight, a line patrol, took place on 18 May 1917. Gerry Nash was the first to score a victory, on 21 May, after diving on a flight of five German scouts, and leaving the pilot of his target slumping back in his cockpit, entering a side-slipping spin. Outnumbered, Gerry was then able to use the excellent climbing ability of the Triplane to exit the fight vertically. It was 31 May before Collishaw was able to properly engage two enemy aircraft, though indecisively.

Collishaw then began a week-long streak of kills, with at least one per day, starting on 1 June, when "B" Flight was out in full force, having three separate engagements within their 2½ hour sortie. Collishaw shot an Albatros down in flames, and Ellis and Gerry / Nash (shared) both scored victories. 2 June began with a hostile air patrol – Collishaw's flight being dispatched to intercept a German two-seater aircraft spotted over the lines. Sending it down out-of-control, their next sortie was escorting some F.E.2b reconnaissance aircraft. When a group of German scouts approached, Collishaw led the attack, and sent one down out-of-control. On 3 June Collishaw (then a flight sub-lieutenant) received his first promotion, to acting flight lieutenant. Members of "B" Flight were up on four separate occasions that day, Collishaw scoring one German Albatros in flames. The same day, flight sub-lieutant (F/S/L) Percy McNeil (Toronto), leader of "A" Flight, was shot down by German ace Karl Allmenröder, and John Sharman was appointed to lead "A" Flight, being replaced in "B" Flight by F/S/L D. F. FitzGibbon (British). 4 June saw Collishaw on another four sorties, with the last of them yielding another victory shot down in flames. 5 June started with a long-range high-altitude offensive patrol over Menin; Collishaw leading a whole-formation firing charge against a two-seater, which went down in flames. Later Collishaw dived below another two-seater, firing a long burst that sent the plane into a long spin, FitzGibbon also connecting a burst as it fell away. 6 June brought a coordinated effort, Collishaw's leading another flight (total of 10 aircraft) in an offensive patrol. At 16,000 feet, the flight ran into a two-seater being escorted by some 15 German fighters. A dogfight ensued, Collishaw quickly downing two in flames, one after the other. Going after a third, his bullets made the pilot fall back as the aircraft plunged into a spin. Nash had gone after the two-seater, and put several bursts into it before it went down, all the way into the ground. He then fired a quick close-range burst at a German fighter, which resulted in it taking a nearly vertical nose-dive. Reid focused on a Halberstadt, maneuvering to keep peppering the fighter as it went down. Various other members of the Naval 10 patrol scored victories as well, and after 35 minutes, 10 of the German aircraft had been either destroyed or thrown from the dogfight in a spin, with no allied losses. Two subsequent large patrols that day, led by Collishaw, encountered no further German aircraft. Finishing the week, Collishaw shot-up one additional Albatros in another large dogfight on 7 June, which fell into a cloud.

9 June brought a close call, and the destruction of the original Black Maria (Triplane N.5490). On the early-morning two-flight offensive patrol, Collishaw's flight dived on a formation of German Albatros D.IIIs. He got on the tail of a German fighter, who upon noticing his position, went into a wild series of tight turns, which Collishaw's Triplane could slightly out-perform. Getting into a favorable position, he was just about to open fire when a stream of bullets smashed into his cockpit, from a German aircraft that had made a diving attack out of the sun. Collishaw's controls were effectively disabled, and his plane drifted off to the side and began a series of turning swoops and dives. Initially terrified, Collishaw's descent over 15 minutes gave way to resignation, and he recalled "thinking rather wistfully how nice it would be to have a parachute." Miraculously, the Triplane's descent pattern of swoops ended up making contact with the ground at an angle that, while folding the Triplane into a mass of wreckage, left Collishaw with nothing but a few bruises. Luckier still, Collishaw had come down within striking distance of the forward British trenches, and a party of them recovered Collishaw, administering "the type of stimulant that one might be expected to appreciate after such an experience..." He vowed to never let himself be attacked out of the sun. Upon returning to base, Collishaw flew Nash's Triplane N.5492.

On 14 June, Collishaw was awarded the Distinguished Service Cross – his first British decoration. On the same day, Jasta 11 was transferred to Marcke, almost directly opposite Naval 10's aerodrome at Droglandt. Ten days later, on 24 June 1917, Naval 10 would meet Jasta 11 directly on the morning patrol. Losses would be registered on both sides, with Karl Allmenröder scoring one. The next day, 25 June, Allmenröder scored another. This time, however, it was an original Black Flight member, coming after they had scored an aggregate total of over 50 victories. Gerry Nash, after a desperate maneuvering battle, was hit and suffered a critical failure of his controls. He was forced to land in German territory – destroying his plane before he was captured. Collishaw and the rest of the flight were deeply grieved at the loss – they had not seen Nash go down – but heartened when they eventually learned he had not been killed.

Two days later, on 27 June 1917, Collishaw would encounter Allmenröder again. Out on patrol, Collishaw's flight spotted a formation of three Albatrosses below him, while also being aware of another flight of German fighters watching from above. He reasoned he could attack them quickly and climb away, so led his flight down in pursuit and from long range (more than 100 yards) let off several bursts.

The Albatros that I fired on was one that I had seen before, with its nose-spinner and tail plane coloured white, the fuselage being red. As I fired I saw it turn upwards and then go down in an apparent spin. We had to get out in a hurry, as the three fighters above were coming down, and we were able to disappear into a convenient cloud. ... After the war's end, however, I learned from German sources the details of Allmenroeder's [sic] death – how he was hit by a burst of fire from extreme range and went down to crash between the lines in the Ypres area. I also learned of the manner in which his Albatros was coloured and it seems likely that it was my fire that sent him down to his death.

Indeed, Nash heard the church bells ring for the funeral of Allmenröder, whom his guard said had been shot down by the leader of the Black Triplanes.

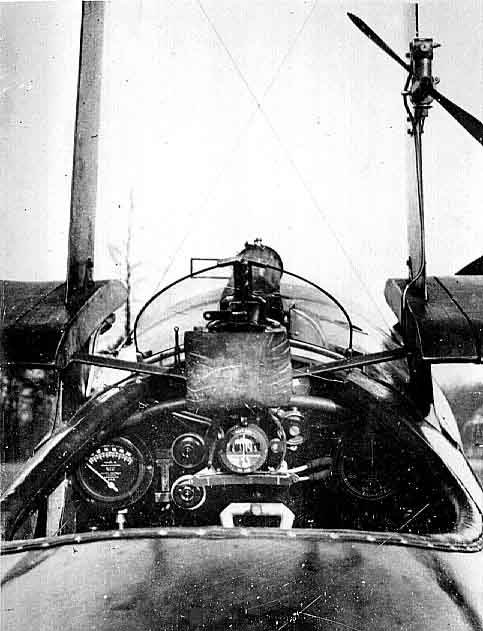
Sopwith Triplane cockpit view

6 July 1917 was Collishaw's most successful day. Diving to the aid of some beleaguered F.E.2d's who were surrounded by what he estimated to be around 30 German fighters, Naval 10's two flights turned the situation into a wild dogfight. Descending onto the rear of a red Albatros, Collishaw took a few burst shots which he thought connected with the pilot and it began going down. No sooner had he made this observation than he had to take violent evasive action to avoid an incoming attack. This whirlwind process continued five more times – each time yielding a damaged German plane exiting the battle. Other members of Collishaw's force scored victories as well, and had accounted for a further four aircraft before the dogfight dissolved. Collishaw was credited with six aircraft shot down out-of-control. The next day, Collishaw was awarded the Distinguished Service Order.

Collishaw suffered two frightening experiences in mid-July. The first was an episode where he had to take very violent evasive action to avoid colliding with a German fighter, snapped his restraining straps and was ejected from the cockpit of his plane – only catching his arms around the top wooden struts, and only able to wrestle back into the cockpit after the Triplane had careened down about 10,000 feet. The second was when shrapnel from anti-aircraft fire sent two sizable pieces of his engine cowling flying, one catching in the wing wires, drastically changing the drag profile of the plane and throwing it into a dangerous spin. Managing as best he could to regain control (by varying all control surfaces and the throttle) and fly the plane, he had no choice but to have a hard landing just past the British line, breaking the plane's undercarriage, but nothing much else.

22 and 28 July were sad days for the squadron, and Collishaw especially, for they marked the losses of John Sharman and Ellis Reid, respectively – both being killed. Sharman's Triplane was struck by anti-aircraft fire and disintegrated mid-air. Reid, it was suspected, fell prey to pilots from Jasta 11. Reid had been Naval 10's second-highest scorer, with 19 kills.

=== Leave to Canada ===
In August, Collishaw returned to Canada for two months' leave, the British Empire's second-highest-scoring living ace. He was virtually unknown, in stark contrast to the grand reception given to the top-scoring living ace, Billy Bishop, when he returned on leave in September. As he recalled, "I was astounded to see so few visible reminders of the war in Canada." He took his time crossing the country to his home in Nanaimo, stopping in some larger cities to visit the families of pilots he had known who had been killed. He also was invited to address some Men's clubs. Collishaw visited his home and became engaged to his future wife.

=== No. 13 Naval Squadron ===
Returning to the war late November, Collishaw was made a flight commander at No. 13 Naval Squadron, which was equipped with Sopwith Camel fighters, and was operating from Dunkirk (St. Pol), doing escort duty with the Channel Patrol. He noted that the pace of sorties was much relaxed compared to what he had experienced at Naval 10 – only once was he up more than once per day. As a result, over his two months with the squadron, he only added one victory to his tally.

One interesting event during this period was an air battle between his squadron and a formation of German scouts in which no shot was fired. Collishaw was leading the entire squadron, providing high-altitude protection for an observation machine at 20,000 feet. A German formation approached, and Collishaw led his pilots to the attack – but found that his guns had jammed; the temperature being so low the oil had frozen. Several times he turned to attack the Germans, and each time they withdrew, until the reconnaissance was complete and both sides returned home. Collishaw later learned that all the squadron's guns were jammed and, years after the war, he met with the German flight leader from that day, who explained that they had experienced the exact same thing. As Collishaw described, "It was surely one of the fiercest and most harmless aerial combats of the war."

Collishaw was abruptly made a squadron commander on 29 December, after his predecessor was injured in a crash. He received a promotion to that effect several days later.

=== Squadron Commander – No. 3 Naval / No. 203 Squadron RAF ===
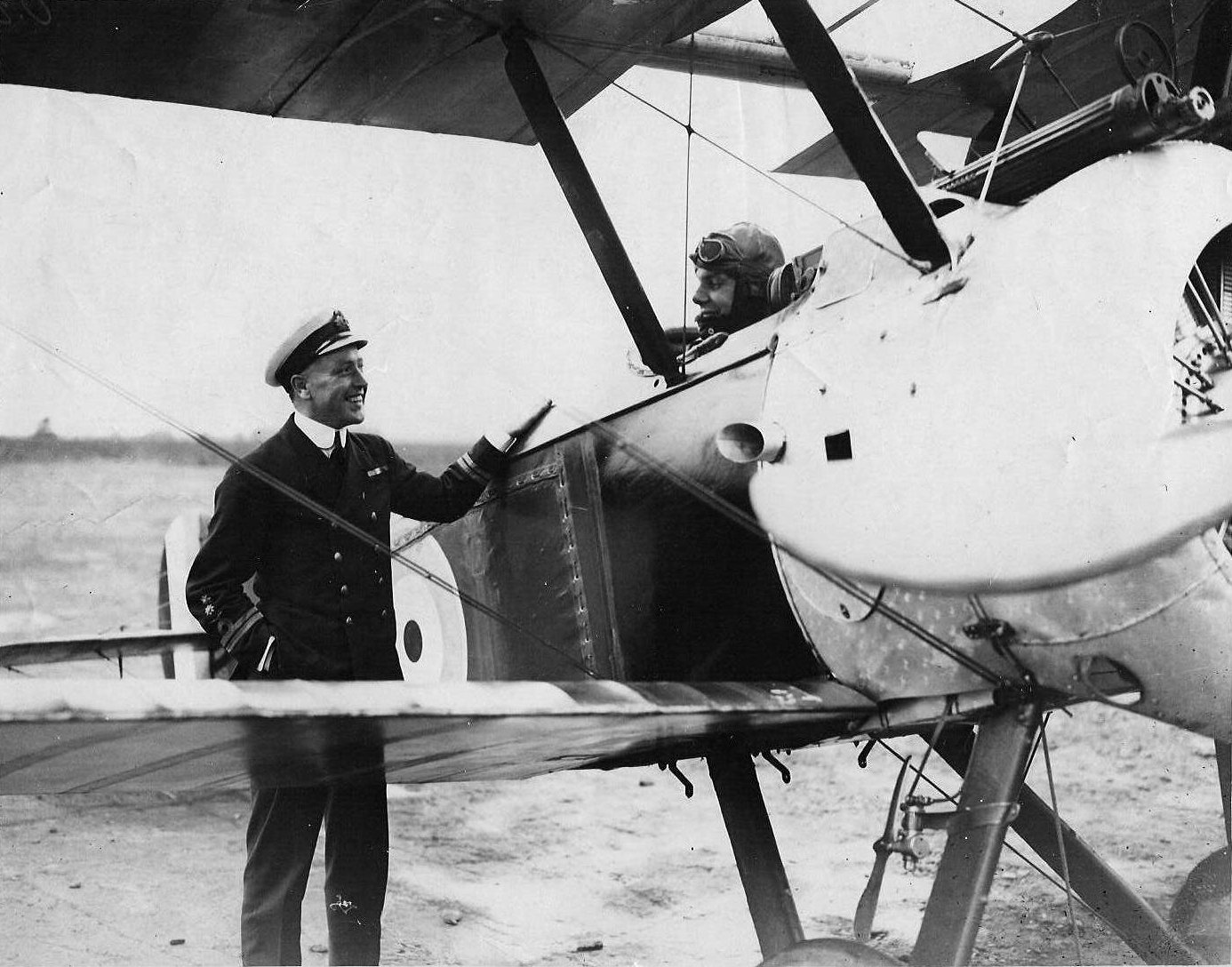
Collishaw and Lt. Arthur Whealy (seated), c. July 1918

On 23 January 1918, Collishaw returned to the embattled area of the Western Front to command No. 3 Naval Squadron (stationed at Mont-Saint-Éloi), one of his previous units. Collishaw found that serving as a commanding officer took up a great deal of his time with "paper work", and as a result, his flight time was significantly curtailed until June. Tactics at the time had shifted: much larger flights needed to be deployed to avoid being overwhelmed by the larger German formations on patrol; and aircraft were now being called upon to do low-level strafing attacks on enemy positions and troops. These attacks were urgently requested after the Germans launched their Spring Offensive, and their forces were rapidly breaking through and rushing through open territory. These advances eventually brought the aerodrome under shellfire, and forced No. 3 Naval to shift bases to Treizennes. On 1 April, the RNAS and the RFC merged into the Royal Air Force, and No. 3 Naval became No. 203 Squadron RAF. Collishaw remained in command with the new rank of major. On 9 April 1918 the situation at the front had improved, and the squadron moved closer to the lines at Liettres – soon joined by Collishaw's old Naval 10 (now No. 210 Squadron RAF). The squadron later shifting to Le Hamel, Collishaw finally got back into the air in early June, and his flight time increased further in July. On 4 July, Collishaw learned he had been awarded the Distinguished Flying Cross. This was followed on 1 August with a bar to his Distinguished Service Order. Scoring intermittently, Collishaw remained in command of 203 Squadron until 21 October, when he was recalled to London, England. He had been credited with 60 victories. In London, Collishaw learned he was to be posted back to Canada, and was in the midst of a tour of the latest pilot training procedures in Britain when the Armistice was signed. He was informed by the Air Ministry that he might participate in an attempt to fly across the Atlantic using a 'Super' Handley Page V/1500 long-range bomber, but this was scrapped due to unwanted media publicity. He took an extended leave in Canada before returning to England in the early Spring of 1919, being promoted to lieutenant colonel.

== Russia 1919 ==
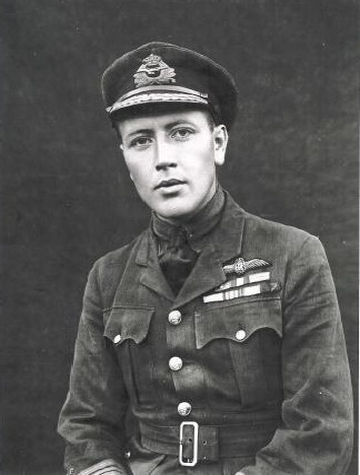
Raymond Collishaw after the First World War

In the Spring of 1919, civil war was raging in Russia. The British government decided that in addition to the current Military Mission that acted in support of General Anton Denikin's White Russian forces, a squadron would be sent to operate under him, and Collishaw was chosen to be in command. Collishaw arrived at Novorossiysk (in the Crimea area) on 8 June 1919, and took command of No. 47 Squadron RAF on 13 June, though it wasn't until 11 July before he could travel in-person to meet them at their operational base at Krasnodar. The Squadron was at the time outfitted with Airco DH.9s. Sopwith Camels would arrive in a reinforcement shipment in September. Given most of the ground fighting in the region was being conducted by horseback cavalry units, the squadron was tooled and designed to operate out of special rail trains – one for each flight (there eventually would be four) – which would be able to quickly follow the front lines, jumping from one suitable makeshift aerodrome or landing site to another.

The squadron's operations were incredibly effective against Red Army forces, mainly consisting of troops, cavalry, and some occasionally hardened positions. Collishaw and his pilots were adept at using their advantages and equipment to maximum effect – reconnaissance, bombing, and strafing inflicted thousands of casualties (particularly after receiving a detachment of Sopwith Camels) on the Red Army and assisted greatly in the initial advances of the White Russian forces through the summer and fall. Their operations were conducted with relative impunity – though small-arms fire would at times get intense, and some fortifications and ships housed dangerous arrays of anti-aircraft batteries. The squadron met with virtually no airborne resistance throughout the campaign, only on a few occasions shooting down some Nieuport and Albatros aircraft (displaying various markings – some having black crosses) that attacked. Collishaw himself, flying a Camel, attacked and destroyed one of these enemy aircraft on 9 October. In early-mid October, just as White Russian forces secured their widest gains to-date, Collishaw came down with Typhus Fever, which was wildly endemic in the region. He was reduced to a comatose state for more than a week, but slowly regained his strength. While recovering, he learned he had been awarded the Order of the British Empire for his service in Russia.

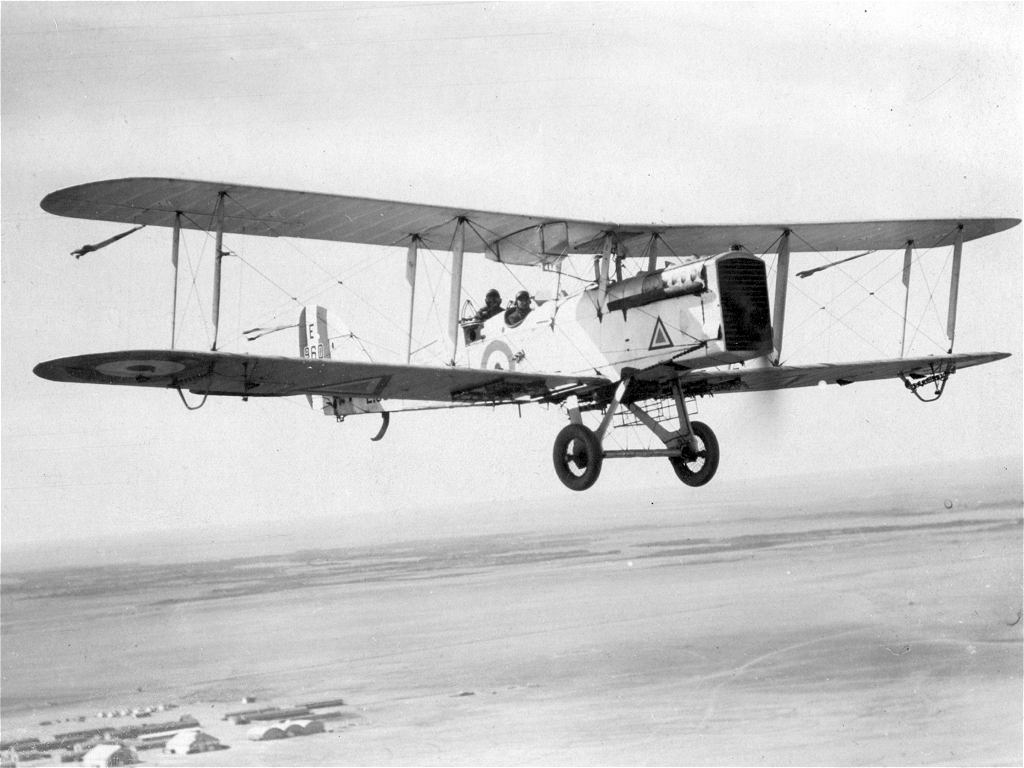
Airco DH.9A – The type Collishaw's forces flew in Russia

By November 1919, White Russian advances had stalled and their over-extended lines had to be pulled back. Leadership and allegiances among the White Russian forces was also beginning to strain as the Red Army was beginning to turn the tide of the battle with incremental advances and occasional breakthroughs. While flight operations continued, weather was deteriorating as winter drew nearer. Bolshevik advances steadily became more rapid and numerous, and Collishaw's forces were increasingly often required to cover retreats. This required they shift bases more rapidly to keep out of harm's way, and led to more intense operational and logistical problems. In at least two instances, planes and materiel were lost to the Red Army as they overtook them.

By the end of December, Red Army advances had become uncontrollable in some areas, and Collishaw's flight train was cut off from the rest of the squadron. This forced the trains – containing troops, refugees, and Collishaw's flight – to go in a different direction, through hostile (though undefended) territories. It also meant going without supplies such as munitions, food, coal, and water for the locomotives, all of which had to be foraged at regular stops along the rail line by available troops in the combined army trains. To make matters worse, word reached them that the Red Army had dispatched an armoured train after them, boasting a front-mounted 9-inch howitzer. Forward rail lines were occasionally being damaged by hostile peasants, requiring makeshift repairs to keep the train moving. Progress was painfully slow, and as the armoured train closed distance to them, things became increasingly anxious and desperate. At one point, the Red Army train did make visual contact with them – fortunately just as Collishaw's train rounded a bend. The Red Army followed-up a few days later by sending an unmanned run-away locomotive down the line, that succeeded in smashing into the back of into Collishaw's train, destroying at least eight cars, and requiring a reconfiguration of the train before they could proceed. Finally, on 4 January 1920, the train reached Crimea, and the "nightmare" as Collishaw called it, was over.

At this point, the campaign was worsening significantly, as Denikin's forces were split and had no meaningful hope of closing the gap. Flight operations recommenced in February. Collishaw's closest call during this campaign, besides the chase by rail and his fight with typhus, was while leading a late-February bombing raid in a DH.9 – his engine was hit by gunfire from the ground, causing it to lose most of its horsepower. Forced to land, he was incredibly fortunate that his engine remained functional (though reduced) and recent weather had combined (being very cold and windy, filling in any dips or trenches in the landscape) to make possible the subsequent twenty miles of taxiing he completed in his aircraft to friendly territory.

In March 1920 the RAF received orders to evacuate. Collishaw noted that his experiences in Russia were far more frightening than those on Western Front – including as they did the many aspects of civil war, a typhus epidemic, and many desperate refugees.

== Inter-war years ==
After 47 Squadron was withdrawn from Russia, Collishaw was sent to Egypt to command No. 84 Squadron. The squadron was moved to Persia, which was made a British protectorate after the war, to defend against the Russians. In the 1921 New Year's Honours List, Collishaw was made an Officer of the Order of the British Empire.

Returning to England, Collishaw was married to his Canadian fiancée, Neita Trapp in late 1923. He attended RAF Staff College in May 1924, and then shifted to command the re-formed No. 23 Squadron, still in England. In 1927, he became the Head of the Department for Operations and Intelligence with the Air Defence of Great Britain (later RAF Fighter Command). In July 1929, he was promoted to wing commander and posted to Malta, serving as the Senior RAF officer aboard HMS Courageous, until September 1932. Transferring back to England Collishaw took command of RAF Bircham Newton, then the station of bomber squadrons Nos. 35 and 207, which were organized as special service units able to rapidly deployed abroad. After three "dull" years there, Collishaw secured a promotion to group captain in 1935, and transferred from Upper Heyford to Sudan to command No. 5 Wing RAF – this in response to the Second Italo-Abyssinian War. After the cessation, he then transferred to the RAF base at Heliopolis, the ensuing years of which Collishaw found "the most pleasant of all those that I spent in uniform."

On 18 April 1939 Collishaw was promoted to air commodore, and took over as Air Officer Commanding "Egypt Group" at Cairo (which would later become 202 Group in September, and after Collishaw's time, the Desert Air Force). Given the perceived impending war with Germany, Collishaw "set about to mould Egypt Group into an operational force capable of carrying out its responsibilities..."

== Second World War ==
At the commencement of the Second World War in 1939, Collishaw concentrated on strategy and tactics to neutralize the Italian air force and to gain aerial superiority in North Africa. This was a tough challenge considering that he was greatly outnumbered (150 aircraft vs. the Italians' nearly 400), and his men were flying outdated Gloster Gladiator biplane fighters, Vickers Wellesley bombers, and a small number of Westland Lysander army co-operation planes. Soon after the war started Collishaw's men were off the mark quickly, striking at an Italian airbase destroying 18 aircraft within two days of the commencement of hostilities with only three aircraft losses. He then turned their efforts to bombing harbors, ships and troops to hold up the reinforcement of North Africa. They damaged the Italian cruiser San Giorgio and blew up an ammo dump.

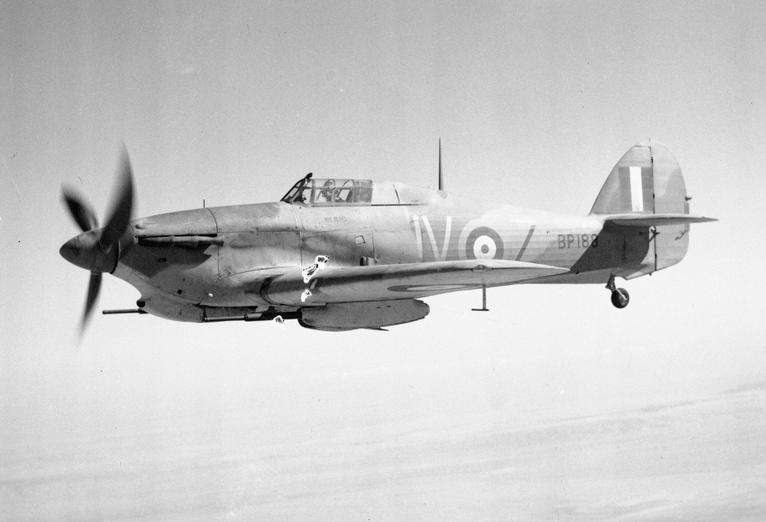
Hawker Hurricane from 6 Sqn. RAF in the desert, c. 1942

His pilots were badly outnumbered and outgunned. But he countered these deficiencies with expert advice on aerial tactics, aggressive attacks and trickery. He had only a single modern Hawker Hurricane fighter to use at the front (three others were relegated to training) dubbed "Colly's Battleship". He made the best of it by constantly moving it from base to base and letting the Italians see it. He came up with the idea of making many, single plane attacks on Italian formations to fool the Italians into thinking he had many Hurricanes. The result was that the Italians spread their superior fighters thinly across North Africa, and seriously diluted their strength. ... Collishaw implemented a policy of continual harassment that forced the Italians into having standing patrols over their positions. This was incredibly wasteful of men, fuel and machines. They should have been on the offensive, and yet were not.

In October 1940, Italy declared war on Greece. This put increased pressure on Collishaw in the form of robbing him of some of his aircraft – sent to aid Greece by the British. However, these transfers were paid back in December by fortunate shipments (transport convoys had to run a very dangerous gauntlet through the Mediterranean) of Hurricanes and Wellington bombers – several squadrons worth. Collishaw still didn't have the numbers (about 48 fighters / 116 bombers to the Italians 191 fighters / 140 bombers), but it was a better situation than before, and this time he had the technological edge. Using these forces, Collishaw offered good support to the British ground offensive into Libya that launched early December as Operation Compass. The offensive had not been planned to advance too far; however, they caught the Italians completely by surprise and were able to push deep into enemy territory, taking Benghazi on 6 February 1941. It was a stunning victory, both on land and in the air. As Collishaw noted, by the end of the offensive:

In all, more than 133,000 prisoners had been captured, with 1,300 guns and massive amounts of transport, stores and equipment. Thirty-five ships were counted in the harbours of Cyrenaica, sunk or disabled by our bombing. Our bag of Italian aircraft, counting machines left behind by the fleeing Italians as well as the wrecks of those that we had shot down, came to 1,100. We had accomplshed the death of an army and an air force.

Collishaw's efforts were specifically recognized by the commanders of the operation. In March 1941 he was made a Companion of the Order of the Bath.

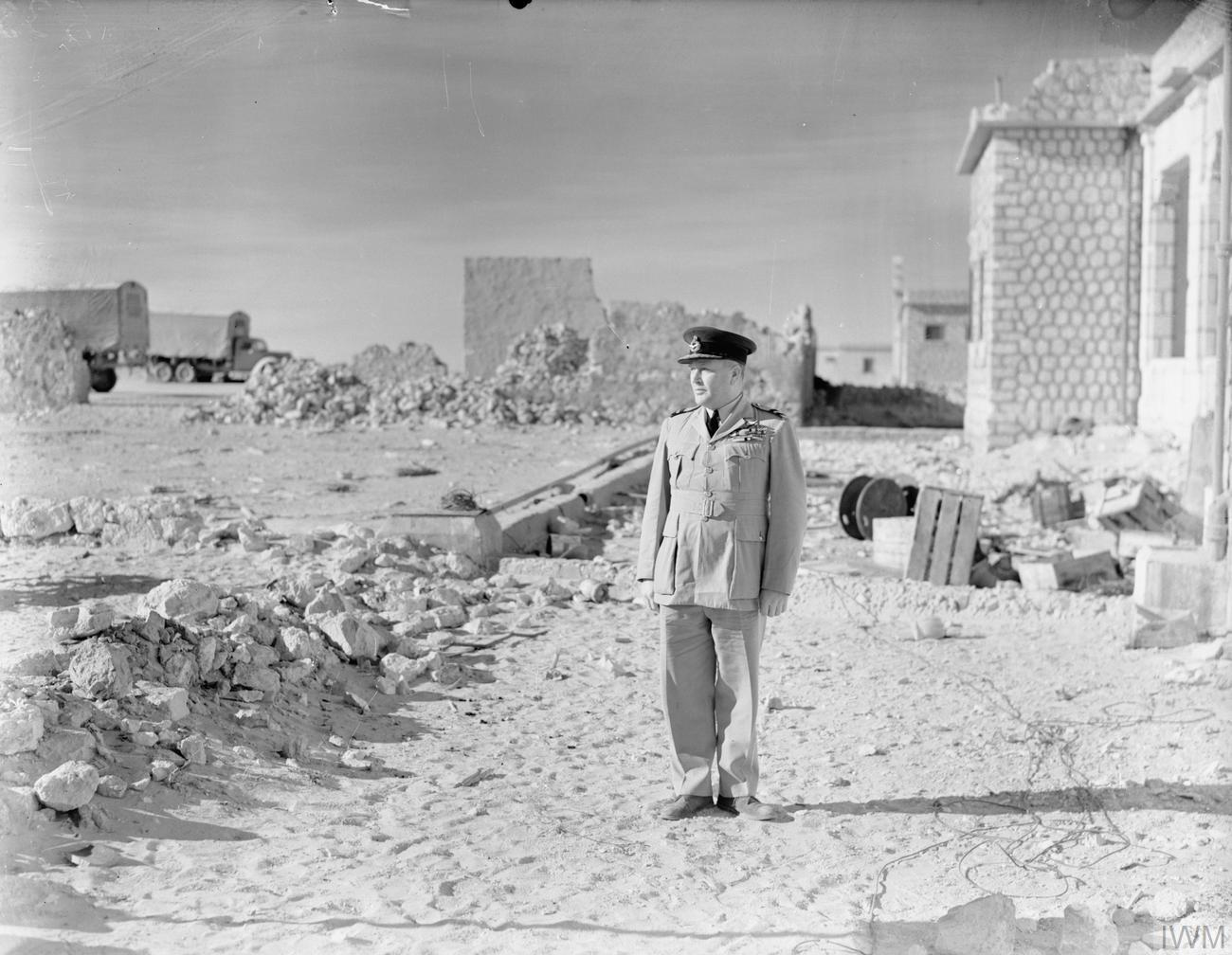
R Collishaw at El Adem, Libya. January 1941. IWM CM399

With the Italians in disarray, Churchill again took some of Collishaw's forces and sent them to Greece. While Collishaw's forces were thereby reduced, he still argued with senior command that British forces should pursue the fleeing Italians to push them completely out of Libya without delay. However with the slow arrival of the Germans in Tripoli, the decision made was to remain in-place. It was not long before aircraft of the Luftwaffe began to provide serious opposition, and their aircraft (particularly the Junkers Ju 87 and Ju 88, and Messerschmitt Bf 109 and Bf 110) were considerably superior to available British forces in Egypt. Logistics, supply, and equipment issues made resisting German air and ground attacks much more difficult. With Italian air reinforcements also starting to flow in, and more calls for ground support, Collishaw's forces were starting to lose more aircraft than they were being supplied with. Command of the RAF was restructured in April, with Collishaw now commanding the 202 Group. Rommel's advances meant that the RAF and supporting units were often being employed to cover retreats, as throughout May the Germans fought the British back through Libya and into the outskirts of Egypt. Around this time, a badly needed convoy arrived carrying 50 Hurricane fighters, but while helpful in replenishing losses, these did not have the range to help save Crete from falling to the Germans (via a mainly airborne invasion) in late May, nor to relieve persistent air attacks on Tobruk, both of which served to sour relations between the RAF and the Army. In June, RAF command structure changed again with Collishaw now under Air Officer Commanding in Chief Arthur Tedder, who instructed Collishaw employ his forces to closely support Army operations, instead of conducting a complimentary but independent air campaign (in accordance with the strengths of his units) as he had in Operation Compass. With the failure of Operation Battleaxe in the middle of June, British forces were seen as in need of reorganization by senior war staff and Churchill himself. While Collishaw's air forces were holding their own and providing excellent support, losses were mounting, replacement crews were relatively inexperienced, and considerable disagreements existed between the different British military branches as to how the RAF should be conducting its operations, and how air support should be rendered.

In July 1941, British high command would eventually clarify the intended, independent roles of the Army and Air Force. Collishaw, along with some other senior British commanders in Africa, was recalled from the desert. He was replaced with Air Vice-Marshal Coningham. Promoted to his final rank of Air Vice Marshal, he was given a headquarters posting in Fighter Command in Scapa Flow, Scotland, and remained there until July 1943, when he "was retired". He spent the rest of the war as a Civil Defense Regional Air Liaison Officer, returning to Canada at war's end.

== Later years and legacy ==
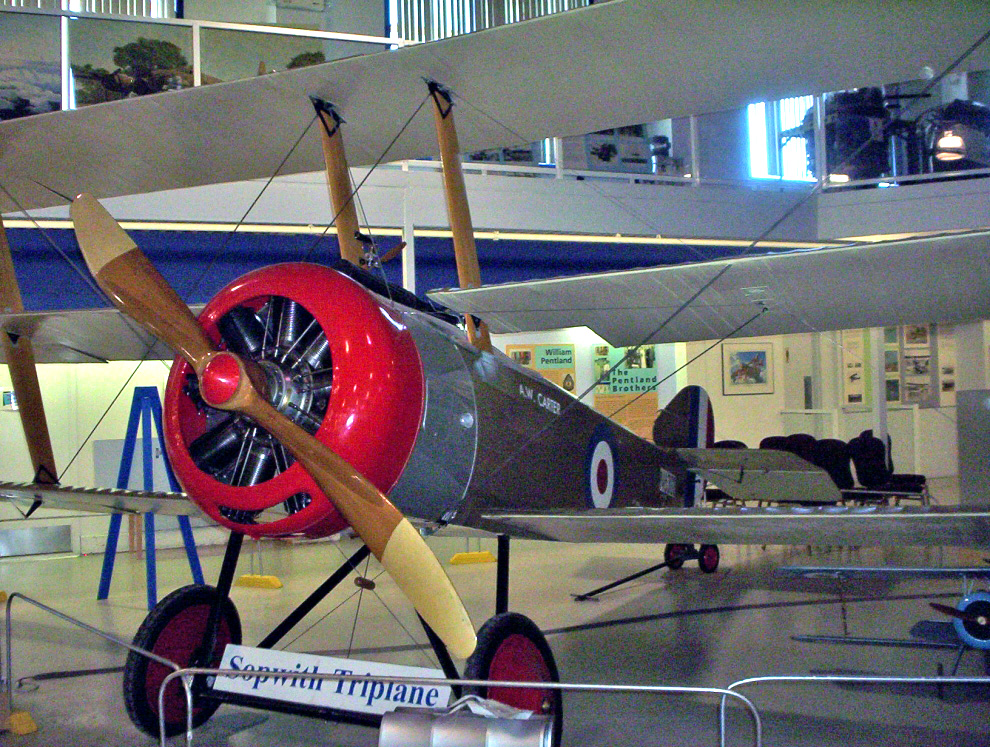
Sopwith Triplane replica at the Calgary AeroSpace museum c. 2005

In his retirement, Collishaw pursued some varied involvement with mining companies, just like his father had before him. In his spare time, Collishaw would often research First World War aerial history, corresponding widely with former pilots, historians, and enthusiasts.

His memoirs were titled Air Command, A Fighter Pilot's Story and were published in 1973.

I feel that my days of command in North Africa, when we had to outwit and outfight a numerically superior enemy by a combination of deception, superior tactics and fighting spirit, represent by far my best effort. Yet if I am known at all to my fellow Canadians and others it is through more carefree days, when as a young fighter pilot, with the limited responsibilities of a flight and squadron commander on the Western Front, I had the good fortune to shoot down a number of the enemy without in turn being killed.

Collishaw died on 28 September 1976 in West Vancouver, British Columbia at the age of 82.

He was widely noted by those who served with him or under him as a very competent and charismatic leader, in all his various capacities. He emphasized camaraderie amongst his men, socializing, and humour.

I deliberately adopted a policy of trying to make everybody happy. Some young fellas have a tendency to go to their cabins and mope – and think of the dangers of tomorrow whence they might be wounded or killed. So I... [saw] to it that all the officers went to the mess and had a jolly good time there, sing-song and drinking... And it worked, too.

He was often seen smiling and had a dutifully cheerful demeanor. As Collishaw would attest in his memoirs, this was a strategic priority:

I commanded seven squadrons, six stations, and four groups, and this experience in command impressed upon me one thing above all else. The commander, to be successful, must possess all the attributes taught at the staff colleges. But above all, he must be able to impart to those under him a spiritual stimulation. He must keep to himself his hopes and his fears and must instill in others confidence and an implacable will to victory. In such a manner will those under the commander make the greatest efforts and show the greatest possible devotion to duty.

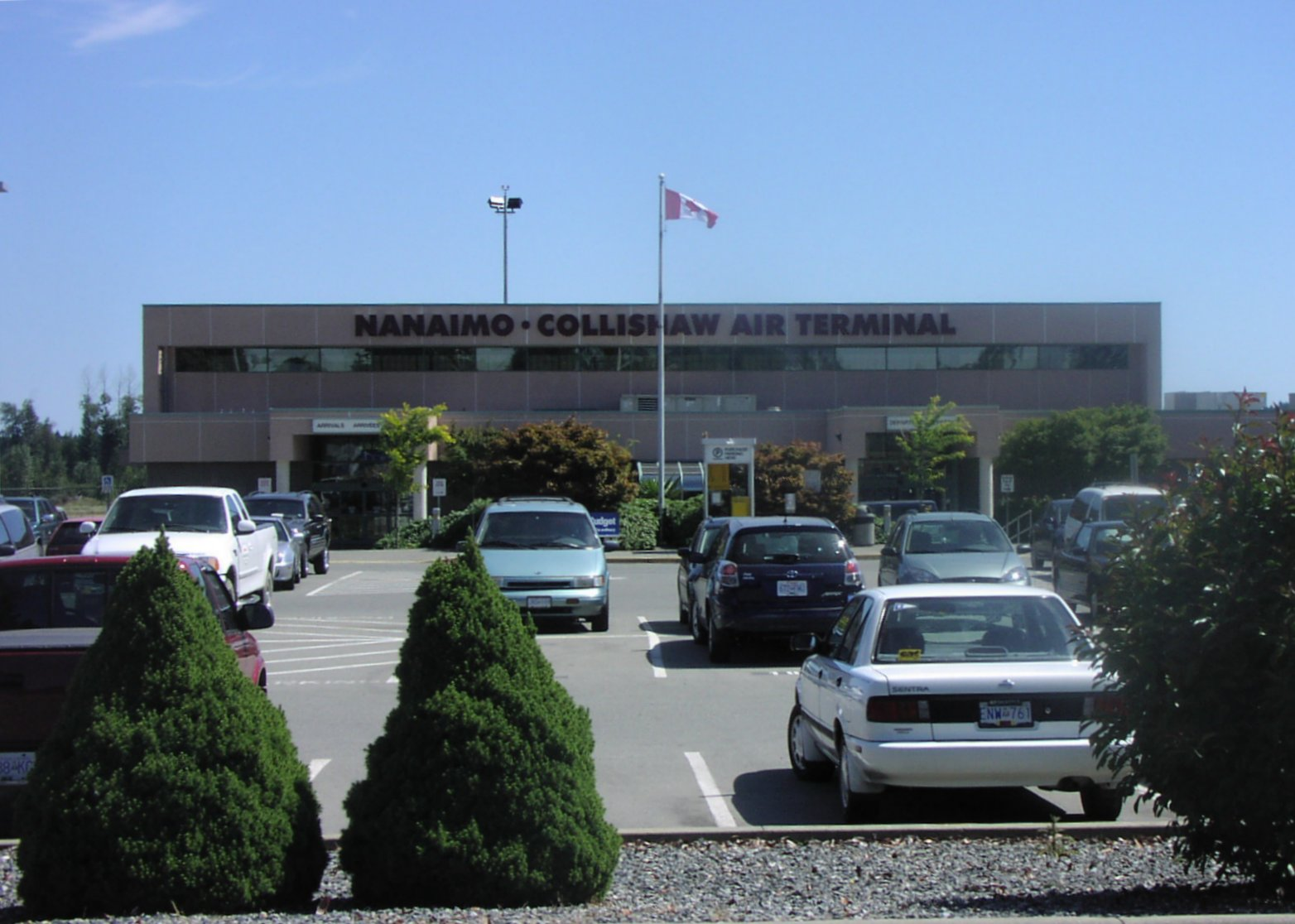
Nanaimo-Collishaw Air Terminal

Given the difficult state of record-keeping and victory standards from the First World War, there have been various historians – and even Collishaw himself, in some ways – that have thought Collishaw's real aerial victory count should be higher. As with some other distinguished First World War flight and squadron leaders, Collishaw was supposedly noted as occasionally helping bolster the confidence of new pilots by attributing victories or successful combat actions to them.

Royal Canadian Air Cadets 205 Collishaw squadron, named after him, is in his hometown of Nanaimo, and 204 Black Maria squadron, named after his aircraft, is located in Kamloops.

On 2 October 1999, the terminal at Nanaimo Airport was named the Nanaimo-Collishaw Air Terminal in his honor.

Military offices
New title Group formed	Air Officer Commanding Egypt Group; Renamed No 202 (Operations) Group in September 1939; 1939–1941	Succeeded by Thomas Elmhirst
New title Group formed by renaming HQ RAF Cyrenaica	Air Officer Commanding No. 204 Group; 1941	Succeeded by Arthur Coningham
Preceded by John D'Albiac	Air Officer Commanding No. 14 Group; 1942–1943	Group disbanded
