= Ellis Vair Reid =

Canadian First World War flying ace

- Born: 31 October 1889; Belleville, Ontario
- Died: 28 July 1917 (aged 27)
- Military career
- Allegiance: George V
- Branch: Royal Naval Air Service
- Rank: Flight Sub Lieutenant
- Units: 3W, No. 10 Squadron RNAF
- Awards: Distinguished Service Cross

Ellis Vair Reid DSC (31 October 1889 – 28 July 1917) was a Canadian First World War flying ace, officially credited with 19 victories.

Reid spent his early years in Belleville, Ontario and moved to Toronto with his family at the turn of the century. After completing high school, Reid attended the University of Toronto School of Architecture, graduating in 1915. It was at this time that Reid's love of flying began to emerge. On 2 January 1916, Reid attested to Britain's Royal Naval Air Service and began training at the Curtiss Flying School in Toronto. He sailed to England from New York City and received his Royal Aero Club Aviator's certificate in July 1916. He was posted to No. 3 Wing after completing his training and in early 1917, was assigned to No. 10 (Naval) Squadron, where he flew alongside other Canadian aces in Black Flight, led by Raymond Collishaw, one of the greatest aces of the war. Reid's plane disappeared over Ypres on 28 July 1917 and his remains were never found. He was posthumously awarded the Distinguished Service Cross. Reid is commemorated on the Arras Flying Memorial.

== Text of citations ==
=== Distinguished Service Cross ===
"Flt. Sub-Lieut. Ellis Vair Reed, R.N.A.S. (since missing).

In recognition of his services on the following occasions:

On 6 June 1917, he attacked and drove down one of four hostile scouts. This machine dived nose first into the ground and was destroyed.

On the afternoon of 15 June 1917, he was leading a patrol of three scouts and encountered a formation of ten enemy machines. During the combat which ensued he forced one machine down completely out of control. Next he attacked at a range of about 30 yards another hostile scout. The pilot of this machine was killed, and it went down completely out of control.

== See also ==
- List of people who disappeared
