= Thomas Sharpe (RAF officer) =

Thomas Sydney Sharpe
- Born: 24 February 1887; Gloucester, England
- Died: Unknown
- Military career
- Allegiance: United Kingdom
- Branch: British Army; Royal Air Force
- Service years: 1915–1920
- Rank: Captain
- Units: Gloucestershire Regiment; No. 24 Squadron RFC; No. 73 Squadron RFC
- Conflicts: World War I • Western Front
- Awards: Distinguished Flying Cross

Captain Thomas Sydney Sharpe DFC (born 24 February 1887; date of death unknown) was a British World War I flying ace credited with six aerial victories.

== Military service ==
Sharpe was commissioned as a second lieutenant (on probation) in the 3rd Battalion, Gloucestershire Regiment, on 17 April 1915. He later trained as a pilot, being granted Royal Aero Club Aviator's Certificate No. 2471 on 19 February 1916. He was confirmed in his rank on 22 March, and was seconded to the Royal Flying Corps and appointed a flying officer on 21 April.

Sharpe flew with No. 24 Squadron from May to July 1916. On 1 February 1917 he was appointed a flight commander with the acting rank of captain.

He was later posted to No. 73 Squadron as a flight commander, to fly the Sopwith Camel single-seat fighter. On 11 March 1918 he destroyed a Fokker Dr.I triplane, then an Albatros D.V and two LVG reconnaissance aircraft on 22 March, and a pair of D.Vs two days later. Three days later, on 27 March, he was shot down and wounded. The identity of his conqueror is debatable. It has been credited to Hans Kirschstein, or as the 71st victory of Manfred von Richthofen; Sharpe himself claimed to have been hit by enemy anti-aircraft fire.

Sharpe was promoted to lieutenant on 1 July 1918, while a prisoner of war, and his award of the Distinguished Flying Cross was gazetted on 20 September 1918. His citation read:

Lieutenant (Temporary Captain) Thomas Sydney Sharpe (Gloucestershire Regiment).

"A gallant officer who has always led his patrol with marked skill and judgment. On one occasion he chased down an Albatross scout and caused it to crash. He afterwards attacked five enemy machines, destroying two. On the following day, encountering four Albatross scouts, he engaged one, which crashed. Proceeding on his patrol, he met a formation of enemy scouts; he chased one and destroyed it."

Sharpe was repatriated on 25 December 1918, and transferred to the RAF's unemployed list on 5 March 1919. He remained in the army until resigning his commission on 1 April 1920.

== Bibliography ==
- Shores, Christopher F.; Franks, Norman & Guest, Russell F. (1990). Above the Trenches: a Complete Record of the Fighter Aces and Units of the British Empire Air Forces 1915–1920. London, UK: Grub Street. ISBN 978-0-948817-19-9.
