= Cedric Popkin =

Australian soldier (1890–1968)

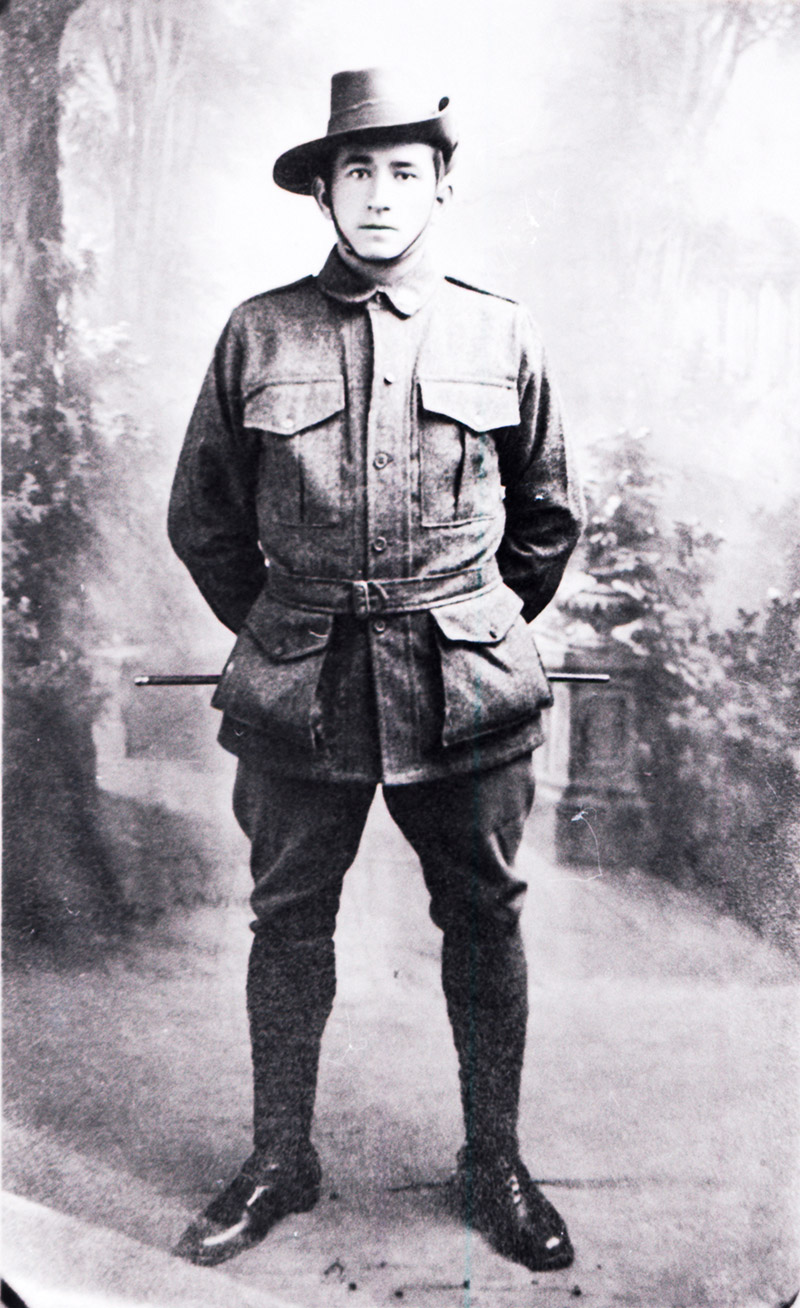
- Popkin c.1914
- Born: Cedric Bassett Popkin; June 20, 1890; Sydney, Australia
- Died: January 26, 1968 (aged 77); Tweed Heads, Australia
- Burial place: Mt. Thompson Memorial Gardens, Brisbane, Australia; 27°31′32.9″S 153°04′39.9″E
- Military career
- Allegiance: Australia
- Service: Australian Army
- Service years: 1916–1919
- Rank: Sergeant
- Unit: 24th Machine Gun Company
- Battles: First World War; German Spring Offensive (WIA)
- Awards: Victory Medal
- Other work: Carpenter, postmaster

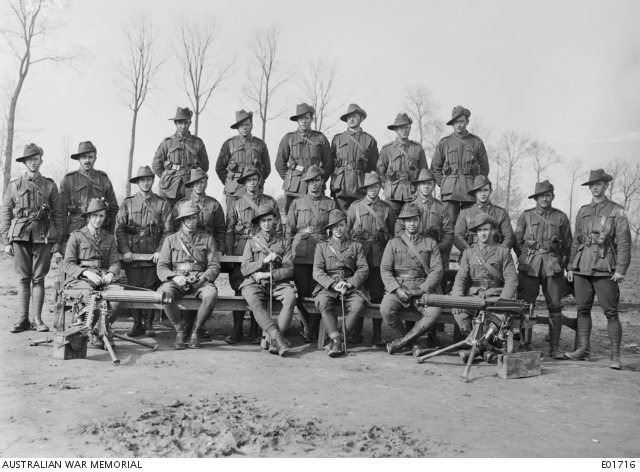
Group portrait of the officers and NCOs of the 24th Machine Gun Company in March 1918. Sergeant Popkin is second from the right in the middle row.

Cedric Bassett Popkin (20 June 1890 – 26 January 1968) was an Australian soldier considered most likely to have killed "The Red Baron". Popkin was an anti-aircraft (AA) machine gunner with the First Australian Imperial Force (AIF) during the First World War.

== Early life ==
Cedric Bassett Popkin was born in Sydney on 20 June 1890 and, by 1904, he and his family were living in the Northern Rivers region of New South Wales and they lived in a number of towns in this area.

Popkin initially trained as a carpenter and is recorded to have been working as this in Mullumbimby in 1908.

He later moved to Brisbane where he married Nellie Ellen Bull on 10 March 1913 and soon after they moved together to South Murwillumbah where he worked as a tobacconist and they had two sons; Roland and Michael.

Later, when he enlisted into the AIF, in Brisbane on 6 May 1916, he was living in Palmwoods, Queensland.

== First World War ==
=== Entry into service ===
Popkin left Australia on 20 October with the 7th Machine Gun Company on HMAT Port Lincoln. By April 1918, Popkin – who had achieved the rank of Sergeant – was a gunner in the 24th Machine Gun Company (an element of the 4th Machine Gun Battalion) stationed in the Somme Valley, France.

=== Death of the Baron ===
At about 10:35 a.m. on 21 April 1918, Richthofen, flying his red Fokker Dr.I, engaged Sopwith Camels from 209 Squadron, Royal Air Force (RAF). He pursued a Camel piloted by a Canadian, Lieutenant Wilfrid May. In turn the Baron was chased by another Canadian pilot, Captain Roy Brown. The three planes flew over Morlancourt Ridge, in the 4th Division's sector, and Popkin – using a Vickers machine gun – and other Australian machine gunners and riflemen also fired at Richthofen. The Baron was hit by a .303 calibre bullet which passed diagonally from right to left through his chest. He then made a hasty but controlled landing, in a field on a hill near the Bray-Corbie road, just north of Vaux-sur-Somme. One witness, Gunner George Ridgway, stated that when he and other Australian soldiers reached the plane, Richthofen was still alive but died moments later. Another eyewitness, Sergeant Ted Smout, reported that Richthofen's last word was "kaputt" ("finished") immediately before he died.

The RAF credited the "kill" to Brown, although it is now considered all but certain by historians, doctors, and ballistics experts that Richthofen was actually killed by an AA machine gunner firing from the ground. The identity of the person who shot the Baron remains uncertain; .303 ammunition was the standard ammunition for all machine guns and rifles used by British Empire forces during World War I. Many experts believe that the shot probably came from Popkin, though some believe that William John "Snowy" Evans may have been responsible. Unsolved History: Death of the Red Baron, 2002, Discovery Channel Autopsies revealed that the wound which killed the Baron was caused by a bullet moving in an upward motion. It was reported that a spent .303 bullet was found inside Richthofen's clothing. These facts, and the angle at which the bullet passed through Richthofen's body, suggest that he was killed by a long distance, low velocity shot from a ground-based weapon. Many Australian riflemen were also shooting at the Baron at the time, so one of them may have fired the fatal shot. However, Popkin was an experienced AA gunner, the volume of fire from the Vickers was far greater (at least 450 rounds per minute) than the bolt-action Lee–Enfield rifles (up to 30 rounds per minute) used by the infantry, and Popkin was the only machine gunner known to have fired at Richthofen from the right, and from a long distance, immediately before he landed.

=== Wounded in action ===
On 19 June 1918, Popkin received a shrapnel wound to his right leg, which was later amputated. He was invalided back to Australia on 5 January 1919, arriving on 7 March.

== Later life ==
After being discharged from the army, Popkin worked once more as a carpenter. He spent most of the remainder of his life in Tweed Heads and the Northern Rivers region of New South Wales. In 1964, he told the Brisbane Courier-Mail: "I am fairly certain it was my fire which caused the Baron to crash, but it would be impossible to say definitely that I was responsible ... As to pinpointing without doubt the man who fired the fatal shot, the controversy will never actually be resolved."

He died in Tweed Heads on 26 January 1968 at the age of 77. He is buried in the Mt. Thompson Memorial Gardens at Brisbane, Australia.

== Planned memorials ==
A memorial to Popkin is being planned for the hinterland town of Palmwoods by the local Returned and Services League (RSL) sub-branch.

Another one is being planned by residents of the village of Tyalgum, where he served as postmaster.
