= Roy Brown (RAF officer) =

Canadian First World War flying ace (1893–1944)

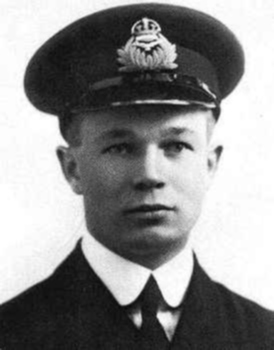
- Brown as a lieutenant in the Royal Naval Air Service
- Born: Arthur Roy Brown; 23 December 1893; Carleton Place, Ontario, Canada
- Died: 9 March 1944 (aged 50); Stouffville, Ontario, Canada
- Military career
- Allegiance: United Kingdom
- Branch: Royal Navy; Royal Air Force
- Service years: 1914–1918
- Rank: Captain
- Nickname: Brownie
- Units: No. 9 Squadron RNAS; No. 209 Squadron RAF
- Conflicts: World War I; Western Front
- Awards: Distinguished Service Cross & Bar

Arthur Roy Brown, DSC & Bar (23 December 1893 – 9 March 1944) was a Canadian flying ace of the First World War, credited with ten aerial victories. The Royal Air Force officially credited Brown with shooting down Manfred von Richthofen, the "Red Baron", although historians, doctors, and ballistics experts consider it all but certain that Richthofen was actually killed by a machine gunner firing from the ground.

== Early years ==
Brown was born to upper-middle-class parents in Carleton Place, 50 km (31 mi) west of Ottawa. His family home still exists, located at 38 Mill Street, just down from the Town Hall. Another source, the Carleton Place and Beckwith Heritage Museum, refers to the family home as being on Judson Street, and says that this was his birthplace. That house also still exists. He was the middle of five children. He had two older sisters, Margaret and Bessie, and two younger brothers, Horace and Howard. His father had started business as a miller, but branched out into electrical generation when the first power grids were being set up around the start of the 20th century. His father eventually owned a power company in the town.

Though Brown did well in high school, he transferred to a business school to study accounting to eventually take over the family business. Following this course, he wanted to continue to university to study business administration, but he needed to have graduated from high school which he had not done. He took a course at the Victoria High School in Edmonton from 1913 to 1915 to get his high-school diploma. There he befriended Wilfrid R. "Wop" May.

== Flight training ==
Brown enlisted in 1914 as an Officer Cadet at the Army Officers' Training. As a prerequisite to joining the Royal Naval Air Service (RNAS), Brown received flight training at the Wright Flying School near Dayton, Ohio, from September to November 1914. He was awarded Aero Club of America Pilot's Certificate No. 361 on 13 November, and was confirmed as a flight sub-lieutenant in the RNAS on the 15th.

== Wartime service ==
Brown set sail for England on 22 November 1914 and underwent further training at Chingford Aerodrome. On 2 May 1916, Brown crashed his Avro 504 emerging apparently unscathed, though next morning he experienced severe back pain as he had broken a vertebra. He spent two months in hospital and in September 1916 was posted to Eastchurch Gunnery School. In January 1917, he was sent to Cranwell to complete advanced training.

In March 1917, Brown was posted to No. 9 Naval Squadron, flying coastal patrols off the Belgian coast in Sopwith Pups. In April, "B" Flight, which included Brown, was attached to the Army's Royal Flying Corps to assist during the Battle of Arras. Brown fell ill at this time and missed "Bloody April", a period when British casualties were very high.

In June 1917, Brown was posted to No. 11 Naval Squadron, and in July he was briefly posted to No. 4 Naval Squadron before returning to No. 11 Naval Squadron later that month. On 17 July, he achieved his first "kill", an Albatros D.III, while flying a Pup, and gathered another three unconfirmed kills.

No. 11 was disbanded in mid-August 1917, and Brown returned to No. 9, equipped with the Sopwith Camel. He was promoted to flight lieutenant on 1 October, and on 6 October, Brown was awarded the Distinguished Service Cross (DSC). His citation read:

Acting Flight Lieutenant (now Flight Lieutenant) Arthur Roy Brown, RNAS.
For the excellent work he has done on active service. On 3 September 1917, he attacked a two-seater Aviatik, in company with his flight. The enemy machine was seen to dive down vertically, the enemy observer falling over on the side of the fuselage shot. On 5 September 1917, in company with formation, he attacked an Albatross scout and two-seater, driving them away from our lines. One machine was observed to go down apparently out of control. On 15 September 1917, whilst on patrol, he dived on two Aviatiks and three Albatross scouts, followed by his flight. He dived several times and picked out one enemy scout, firing about 200 rounds, when the enemy machine went down out of control, spinning on its back. On 20 September 1917, whilst leading his flight, he dived on five Albatross scouts. Flight Lieutenant Brown picked out one enemy machine and opened fire. One of his guns jammed, but he carried on with the other. The enemy machine went down out of control and over on its back, and remained in that position for about thirty seconds, whilst Flight Lieutenant Brown continued firing until his other gun jammed. The enemy machine then disappeared in the clouds, still on its back. Another officer of the same patrol was later followed by four enemy machines, as he was separated from the formation. Both Flight Lieutenant Brown's guns were jammed, but he dived on the enemy machines and drove them off, thus undoubtedly saving the pilot's life.

Soon after, Brown was made a flight commander, a role in which he excelled. No. 9 was posted to the Somme area in early 1918, and was forced to retreat during the German spring offensive between 20 and 29 March. The tempo of operations increased, with the entire squadron typically flying two missions a day. Colonel Raymond Collishaw noted on an April visit that Brown looked exhausted: he had lost 11 kg (25 lb), his hair was prematurely turning grey, and his eyes were bloodshot and sunken. Also eating contaminated rabbit had left him severely sickened with gastritis. Against Collishaw's suggestions, Brown refused to quit flying, and shot down another two aircraft on 11 and 12 April.

On 1 April 1918, the RFC and RNAS were merged into the Royal Air Force. Brown's No. 9 Squadron RNAS became No. 209 Squadron RAF.

== Fighting the Red Baron ==
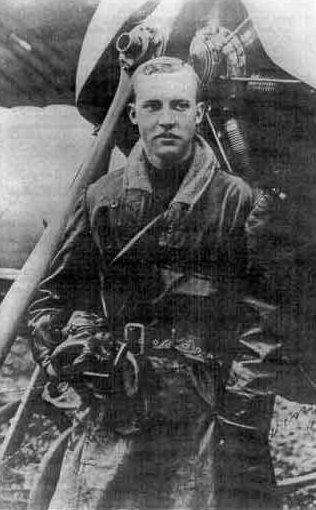
Wop May

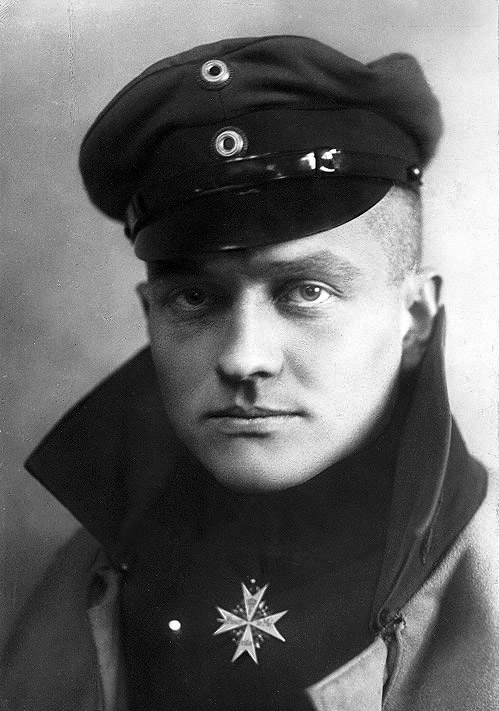
Manfred von Richthofen

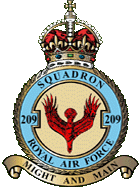
209 Squadron badge. Blazon: An eagle volant recursant descendant in pale, wings overture

On the morning of 21 April 1918, No. 209 was on patrol when they became engaged in combat with fighters of Jagdstaffel 11, led by Manfred von Richthofen, the "Red Baron". A newcomer to No. 209, Brown's school friend, Lieutenant Wilfrid "Wop" May, had been instructed to stay clear of any fight and watch. May noticed an enemy pilot doing the same thing. That pilot was the Red Baron's cousin, Lt. Wolfram von Richthofen, who had been given the same instructions as May. May attacked Wolfram and soon found himself in the main fight, firing at several fleeting targets until his guns jammed. May dived out of the fight, and Manfred von Richthofen gave chase down to ground level. Brown saw May in trouble and dived steeply in an attempt to rescue his friend. His attack was necessarily of fairly short duration, as he was obliged to climb steeply to avoid crashing into the ground, losing sight for the moment of both Richthofen and May.

What happened next remains controversial to this day, but it seems highly probable that Richthofen turned to avoid Brown's attack, and then, instead of climbing out of reach of ground fire and prudently heading for home, remained at low altitude and resumed his pursuit of May, who was still zig-zagging, as he had not noticed that Richthofen had been momentarily distracted. It would have been physically impossible for Richthofen to have done this had he already received the wound from which he died. May and Richthofen's route now took them at low level over the heavily defended Allied front line. Franks and Bennett have suggested that Richthofen had become lost, as the winds that day were blowing the "wrong way", towards the west, and the fight had drifted over to the Allied side. The front was also in a highly fluid state at the time, in contrast to the more common static trench lines earlier in the Great War, and landmarks can be confusing in very low level flight.

Australian machine gunners on the ground fired at Richthofen, who eventually crashed near the Australian trenches. Brown's initial combat report was that the fight with Richthofen was "indecisive" – this was altered by his commanding officer to "decisive". Modern historical consensus suggests that Australian anti-aircraft gunner Sergeant Cedric Popkin is the person most likely to have been responsible for the shot that actually downed the Baron.

Brown was officially credited with the kill by the RAF, shortly after receiving a Bar to his DSC, at least partly in recognition of this feat. The citation read:

Lieutenant (Honorary Captain) Arthur Roy Brown, DSC.
For conspicuous gallantry and devotion to duty. On 21 April 1918, while leading a patrol of six scouts, he attacked a formation of 20 hostile scouts. He personally engaged two Fokker triplanes, which he drove off; then, seeing that one of our machines was being attacked and apparently hard-pressed, he dived on the hostile scout, firing all the while. This scout, a Fokker triplane, nose dived and crashed to the ground. Since the award of the Distinguished Service Cross he has destroyed several other enemy aircraft and has shown great dash and enterprise in attacking enemy troops from low altitudes despite heavy anti-aircraft fire.

== Later years ==
Nine days after the combat with von Richthofen, Brown was admitted to hospital with influenza and nervous exhaustion. In June, he was posted to No. 2 School of Air Fighting at Marske Aerodrome, as an instructor. He was involved in a bad air crash on 15 July, and spent five months in hospital.

Brown left the RAF in 1919 and returned to Canada where he took up work as an accountant at a small town grocery store and later moved to Toronto to work at Imperial Varnish and Color Company until he retired in 1934. He also founded a small airline in 1928, General Airways Limited in Amos, Quebec and in same year married Edythe Moneypenny. Brown worked for a while as editor of Canadian Aviation. When the Second World War broke out, he attempted to enlist in the Royal Canadian Air Force, but was refused. He instead entered politics, losing an election for the Ontario legislature in 1943. The Browns moved to Stouffville in 1939 and in 1943 purchased a dairy farm at Bethesda Road and Warden Avenue near Stouffville, Ontario (now part of the property of Rolling Hills Golf Club). Brown was inducted into the Canadian Aviation Hall of Fame in 2015.

Brown died on 9 March 1944, of a heart attack, in Stouffville, Ontario shortly after posing for a photograph with a current Canadian flying ace, George Beurling. He was 50 years old. He is buried, with his wife, Edythe, in the Toronto Necropolis.

== Memorials, tributes and relics ==
In 1918, Brown acquired the seat of the Fokker Dr.| triplane in which Richthofen made his final flight; in 1920 he donated his souvenir to the Royal Canadian Military Institute.

A memorial plaque titled "Captain A. Roy Brown, D.S.C. 1893–1944", was erected at the Carleton Place Public Library by the Ontario Heritage Foundation, in memory of Brown.

In November 2012, the town of Carleton Place further paid tribute to Brown with a prominent mural on the town's main street. A museum dedicated to Brown was also opened in Carleton Place.

In 2015, Brown was posthumously inducted into Canada's Aviation Hall of Fame.

In 2016, a new headstone was erected for Brown in the Toronto Necropolis. The stone was unveiled by his nieces, Carol Nicholson and Nadine Carter.

On 28 November 2020, a bronze statue depicting Arthur Roy Brown was unveiled in Carleton Place. The most beloved son of the town, the statue sits in a park facing the Mississippi Lake close to the Roy Brown Museum and the mural of the famous dogfight (deadly air battles).

== Brown in film and fiction ==
Although Roy Brown has left a much smaller mark in popular culture than Manfred von Richthofen's, his legacy is remembered sporadically.

Brown was a minor character in Karl Ritter's 1938 film, Pour Le Merite. He is shown as a captured aviator who shares a meal with the German squadron that shot him down. He then is allowed to escape.

Brown was portrayed by Don Stroud in the 1971 film Von Richthofen and Brown. He is depicted as a cynical, cocky, ruthless rebel without a cause who does not believe in honour. He bullies his way to leadership and has his squadron hunt in packs with a plane as bait. This movie depicts Brown being responsible for Richthofen's death.

In the 2008 film The Red Baron, he was portrayed by Joseph Fiennes. He is depicted as Richthofen's rival, being shot down by Richthofen early on in the film and subsequently escaping from a German Prisoner of War camp. In a dogfight later, Brown and Richthofen are forced to ditch their aircraft in no man's land, where they share a friendly drink. At the end of the film, Brown assists Richthofen's fictional love interest, Käte Otersdorf, in crossing into allied lines to visit his grave.
