= Red Baron Airport Airpark =

Coordinates: 43°18′35″N 115°54′05″W

Red Baron Airport Airpark is an airpark and private airport in Oasis, Idaho. It is owned by Red Baron Estates Pilots & HOA, located on Red Baron Estates, and named after the Red Baron. Just north of I-84, 1id4 is 20.7 nautical miles (38.3 km) SE from Boise Airport (BOI) and 16.1 nautical miles (29.8 km) north of Mountain Home Air Force Base (MUO). As of 2023-12-20 there have been no arrivals for a year.
