= Tom Rees (aviator) =

First recorded airman killed by Manfred von Richthofen

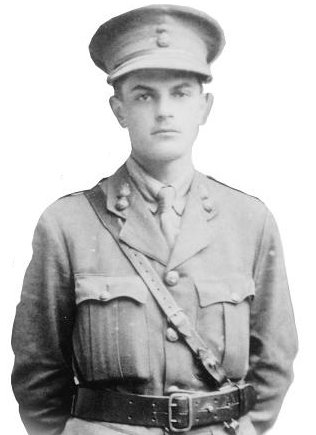
- Rees in 1915
- Born: 18 May 1895; Sennybridge, near Brecon, Wales
- Died: 17 September 1916 (aged 21) near Marcoing, France
- Burial place: Grave C2 Villers Plouich, France
- Military career
- Rank: Captain
- Units: 14th Battalion, Royal Welch Fusiliers; No. 11 Squadron RFC

Tom Rees (18 May 1895 – 17 September 1916) was a British Army officer who served in the Royal Flying Corps during the First World War. Joining the military in early 1915, Rees was raised to the rank of lieutenant before his 21st birthday, and eventually reached captain on the day of his death. He was killed on 17 September 1916 while flying as an observer in an F.E.2b aircraft, which was shot down by Manfred von Richthofen, the German flying ace who was later known as the "Red Baron". The aircraft was the first of Richthofen's 80 credited aerial combat victories.

== Early life ==
Tom Rees was born on 18 May 1895 to a Welsh-speaking farming family at Cefnbrynich, a farm near Sennybridge about 10 miles (16 km) from Brecon in Wales. The son of Thomas Rees and Alice Rees (née Evans), he was the youngest of their six children. He attended Brecon Boys' County School, before commencing at University College of Wales at Aberystwyth in 1912. He was considered a scholar and was described as a smart university student.

== Military career ==
While Rees was at Aberystwyth University, he joined the Officers' Training Corps, and upon his graduation with a bachelor of arts degree, volunteered for war service, and joined the Army. On 21 January 1915, he was commissioned as a second lieutenant in the Royal Welch Fusiliers, an infantry regiment, and he was subsequently posted to that regiment's 14th (Service) Battalion, briefly serving with them on the Western Front. He volunteered to join the Royal Flying Corps in November 1915 and returned to the United Kingdom for aircrew training. Upon graduating, he was posted to No. 11 Squadron and returned to the front. He had earned early promotion to lieutenant as a result of his "academic abilities" prior to his transfer and this was later followed by advancement to captain, which was promulgated on 17 September 1916.

== Death ==
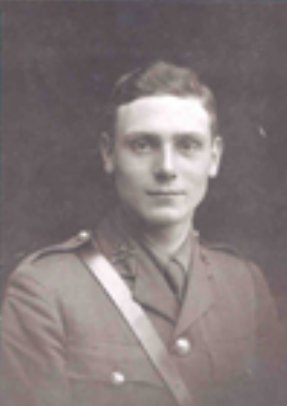
Lionel Morris, who was the pilot of Rees' aircraft, in 1916

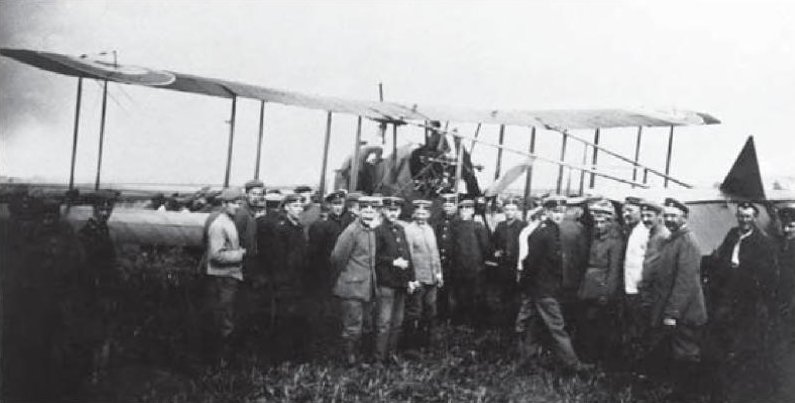
FE 2b, serial number 7018

On Sunday, 17 September 1916, Rees was the observer in a two-man F. E. 2b, serial number 7018, piloted by Second Lieutenant Lionel Morris. (Note: Some of Morris's records are retained at The National Archives, Kew.) They were part of a group of eight Royal Aircraft Factory B.E.2cs and six F.E.2b escorts from the Royal Flying Corps 3rd Brigade. As the formation returned from bombing the railway station at Marcoing, they encountered a group of about 20 German aircraft from Jasta 2. Manfred von Richthofen, who later came to be known as the "Red Baron", was newly assigned to Jasta 2, and was under the tutelage of Oswald Boelcke. Upon sighting the British aircraft, Boelcke gave the sign to attack, but held back himself. In the ensuing fight, two aircraft from No. 12 Squadron RFC and four from No. 11 Squadron were shot down, including Rees and Morris' aircraft, which was shot down by von Richthofen. Rees was killed during the dogfight with Von Richthofen; (Note: Richthofen's own career was cut short when he was mortally wounded by a single bullet and made a similar landing before expiring. The "Red Baron" had a fear that he would die in flames (the number of aircraft that went down in flames increased substantially in 1917–18, probably due to changed ammunition) and be denied the final honour of a burial beneath a cross. Like Rees and Morris, he was accorded full military honours, this time by Australian troops. Notably, von Richthofen's mentor, Oswald Boelcke expired and accomplished a deadstick landing and had no visible wounds after perhaps colliding with Erwin Böhme, and also involving his most famous pupil.) this was the "Red Baron's" first official victory.

von Richthofen recalled getting a superior position on a two-seater British plane for his first confirmed kill. “I gave a short series of shots with my machine gun.” In the dogfight, von Richthofen said he "had gone so close that I was afraid I might dash into the Englishman. Suddenly, I nearly yelled with joy for the propeller of the enemy machine had stopped turning.”

For von Richthofen, this was the first of the 80 confirmed aerial combat victories with which he was credited before his death in April 1918. (Note: Richthofen in all probability had two earlier unconfirmed kills. For three months in the summer of 1915, he was stationed on the Eastern Front serving as an observer/machine gunner during reconnaissance missions. After transfer to the Champagne front, he shot down an attacking French Farman aircraft, but received no credit when it fell behind Allied lines. After a chance meeting with German ace fighter pilot Oswald Boelcke, he undertook pilot training. After soloing on 10 October 1915, and passing his pilot's examination on 25 December, he joined a bomber squadron in March 1916. On 26 April, while flying over Verdun in an Albatros C.III, he shot down a French Nieuport, but once again was denied credit.) The circumstances foreshadowed his death later in the war. His account of the event noted that the pilot was probably experienced, as he appeared conscious of the danger he was in and did his best to escape, as von Richthofen manoeuvred his new Albatros D.II serial number 491/16, into position to attack. Rees, in the observer's position, fired constantly from the forward-facing Lewis machine gun (which could also be turned to fire backwards over the pilot). Von Richthofen recounted that at the time he was not sure whether the F.E.2b would fall, until he was able to close up behind it during a moment of nonevasive flying, taking advantage of the F.E.2b's vulnerability underneath. After he fired, the propeller stopped turning, indicating that he must have hit the engine. Rees was not visible and the plane was flying unsteadily, indicating to von Richthofen that both British men had been injured. Morris managed to land the aeroplane at a nearby German airfield at Flesquières. Von Richthofen followed the F. E. 2b down and saw the dead observer and badly wounded pilot (who died later the same day), then flew back to his squadron's base at Bertincourt.

He contacted a jeweller in Berlin and ordered a silver cup engraved with the date and the type of enemy aircraft ("1. Vickers 2. 17.9.16"). (Note: Similar cups had been officially awarded to some earlier pilots on their first victories, although the practice had been discontinued by this time.) He continued to celebrate each of his victories in the same manner until he had 60 cups, by which time the dwindling supply of silver in blockaded Germany meant that silver cups could no longer be supplied. Von Richthofen discontinued his orders at this stage, rather than accept cups made from base metal. (Note: Burrows has suggested that he was simply bored with the procedure and that this was an excuse to discontinue it.)

Manfred von Richthofen later recalled, "I was animated by a single thought: the man in front of me must come down". He closed in to point-blank range, opened fire, and "suddenly the opponent's propeller turned no more. Hit!" The plane evidently lacked the speed to return to its own lines. When it was forced down, von Richthofen landed his craft near the aircraft and documented his kill. This delayed his return to the Jasta headquarters, and he explained the delay with "One Englishman shot down".

Rees was buried with full military honours by the Germans. According to von Richthofen, he "honoured the fallen enemy by placing a stone on his beautiful grave." His remains were reinterred in Grave C 2 of the town cemetery, Mynwent Cymunedol Villers-Plouich Communal Cemetery at Villers Plouich. Rees's family learnt of his death in November 1916, on the morning of the funeral of his older brother David John, who had been killed in a tree-felling accident adjacent to the family farm.

Morris is buried at Cambrai, Porte de Paris Cemetery, Grave: I A 16.

Rees was described to Morris' father, in a letter from the pilot of another aircraft that was also shot down, as being "a very capable and plucky observer".

== Legacy ==
After his death, Rees was nominated for a Mention in Despatches, for his "excellent work as an observer" by his commanding officer, who cited that he had flown many sorties between July and September 1916, before being posted as missing in action. He was later awarded the 1914–15 Star, the British War Medal, and the British Victory Medal for war service. In 1999, Rees's war medals were sold at auction, and fetched £4,500 (circa US$7,200) because of their historical significance.

For the 100th anniversary of Rees and Morris' deaths, descendants of von Richthofen and Rees and Morris met each other for the first time.

== Sources ==
- Bush, Jill (2019). Lionel Morris and the Red Baron. Yorkshire, UK and Philadelphia, USA: Pen and Sword Books Ltd. ISBN 9781526742223.
- Guttman, Jon (2009). Pusher Aces of World War 1. Oxford: Osprey Publishing. ISBN 978-1-84603-417-6.
- Hart, Peter (2015). The Great War / A Combat History of the First World War. Oxford, UK: Oxford University Press. ISBN 9780190227357.
- Jones, H. A. (2002) [1928]. The War in the Air: Being the Story of the Part Played in the Great War by the Royal Air Force. History of the Great War based on Official Documents by Direction of the Historical Section of the Committee of Imperial Defence. Vol. II (N & M Press ed.). Oxford: Clarendon Press. ISBN 1-84342-413-4.
- Kilduff, Peter (1999). The Red Baron: Beyond the Legend. London: Cassell Military. ISBN 978-0-304-35207-4.
- Miller, James F. (2013). Albatros D.I-D.II. Oxford: Osprey Publishing. ISBN 978-1-78096-601-4.
- O'Connor, Mike; Franks, Norman L. R. (2004). In the Footsteps of the Red Baron. Barnsley: Pen & Sword Military. ISBN 978-1-84415-087-8.
- O'Connor, Mike (2003). Airfield and Airmen: Cambrai. Barnsley, South Yorkshire: Pen & Sword Books. ISBN 9781783409976.
- Rice, Earl Jr. (2013). Manfred von Richthofen. New York: Infobase Learning. ISBN 978-1-4381-4700-0.
