= List of aerial victories of Manfred von Richthofen =

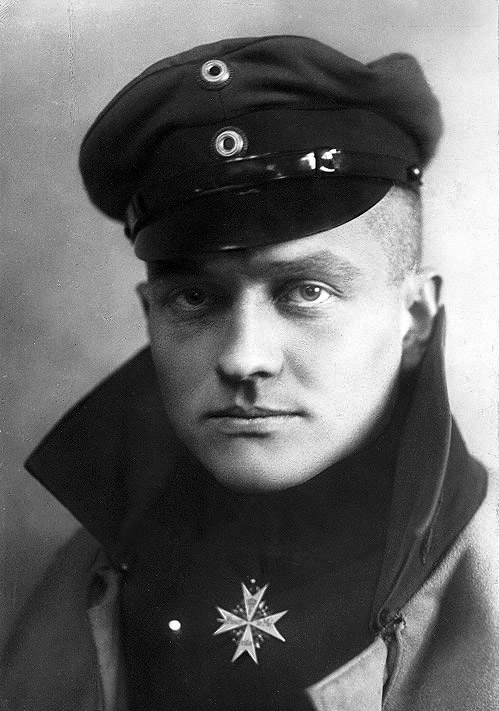
Manfred von Richthofen

Manfred Albrecht Freiherr von Richthofen (2 May 1892 – 21 April 1918), widely known as the Red Baron, is considered the ace-of-aces of the First World War, being officially credited with 80 air combat victories, more than any other pilot of the war – before being killed in action near Amiens on 21 April 1918.

As the following list demonstrates, his victories are well documented. Victories are against British flyers unless otherwise noted. The † indicates death.

Victory nº	Date	Hour	Defeated	Opponent/s unit	Opponent/s aircraft	Richthofen's unit	Richthofen's aircraft	Location
1	17 September 1916	1100	Lt. Lionel Morris †; Capt. Tom Rees †;	11 Sqn.	F.E.2b (7018)	Jasta 2	Albatros D.II(491/16)	Near Villers Plouich
2	23 September 1916	1100	Sgt. Herbert Bellerby †	27 Sqn.	Martinsyde G.100 (7481)	Jasta 2	Albatros D.II(491/16)	Bapaume
3	30 September 1916	1150	Lt. Ernest Conway Lansdale †; Sgt. Albert Clarkson †	11 Sqn.	F.E.2b (6973)	Jasta 2	Albatros D.II(491/16)	Near Lagnicourt
4	7 October 1916	0910	2/Lt. William Fenwick †	21 Sqn.	B.E.12 (6618)	Jasta 2	Albatros D.II(491/16)	Near Equancourt
5	16 October 1916	0500	2/Lt. John Thompson DCM †	19 Sqn.	B.E.12 (6580)	Jasta 2	Albatros D.II(491/16)	Near Ypres
6	25 October 1916	0935	(probably) 2/Lt. W.T.W Wilcox (WIA; POW)	21 Sqn.	B.E.12 (6654)	Jasta 2	Albatros D.II(491/16)	Near Bapaume- also listed as 2/Lt. Arthur James Fisher (vs Kurt Wolff)
7	3 November 1916	1410	Sgt. Cuthbert Baldwin †; Lt. George Bentham Andrew †	18 Sqn.	F.E.2b (7010)	Jasta 2	Albatros D.II(491/16)	NE of Grévillers Wood
8	9 November 1916	1030	2/Lt. Ian Gilmour Cameron †	12 Sqn.	B.E.2c (2506)	Jasta 2	Albatros D.II(491/16)	Beugny
9?	20 November 1916	0940	(possibly) Lt. Thomas Henry Clarke (POW); 2/Lt. James Lees (POW)	15 Sqn.	B.E.2c (2767)	Jasta 2	Albatros D.II(491/16)	S of Grandcourt (prob. versus Lt Kirmaier)
10	20 November 1916	1615	2/Lt. Gilbert Sudbury Hall †; 2/Lt. George Doughty †	18 Sqn.	F.E.2b (4848)	Jasta 2	Albatros D.II(491/16)	Grandcourt
11	23 November 1916	1500	Maj. Lanoe Hawker VC DSO †	24 Sqn.	D.H.2 (5964)	Jasta 2	Albatros D.II(491/16)	S of Bapaume
12	11 December 1916	1155	Lt. Benedict Philip Hunt (POW)	32 Sqn.	D.H.2 (5986)	Jasta 2	Albatros D.II(491/16)	Near Arras
13	20 December 1916	1130	Capt.Arthur Gerald Knight, DSO †	29 Sqn.	D.H.2 (7927)	Jasta 2	Albatros D.II(491/16)	Menchy
14	20 December 1916	1345	Lt. Lionel George D'Arcy †; Sub-Lt. Reginald Whiteside (RNVR) †	18 Sqn.	F.E.2b (A5446)	Jasta 2	Albatros D.II(491/16)	Moreuil
15?	27 December 1916	1625	(possibly) Capt. JB Quested (WIA); Lt. HJH Dicksee (unhurt) (Some sources claim that this was Sgt. James McCudden of No.29 Squadron, in a DH.2.)	11 Sqn.	F.E.2b (6937)	Jasta 2	Albatros D.II(491/16)	Quested/Dicksee were downed at 11.20 hours, 12 km east of Ficheux (probably versus Jasta 1)- inside Allied lines. Richthofen claimed his kill at 16.25 hours. McCudden, who returned to base, fits the time period.
16	4 January 1917	1615	Flt/Lt. Allan Switzer Todd CAN †	8 RNAS	Sopwith Pup (N5193)	Jasta 2	Albatros D.II(491/16)	Near Metz-en-Couture
17	23 January 1917	1610	2/Lt. John Hay AUS †	40 Sqn.	F.E.8 (6388)	Jasta 11	Albatros D.II(491/16)	S of Lens
18	24 January 1917	1215	Lt. John MacLennan (WIA: POW); Capt. Oscar Greig (WIA: POW);	25 Sqn.	F.E.2b (6997)	Jasta 11	Albatros D.III(789/17)	O of Vimy
19	1 February 1917	1600	Lts. Percival Murray †; Duncan John McRae CAN †	16 Sqn.	B.E.2d (6742)	Jasta 11	Albatros D.II	1 km SO of Thelus
20	14 February 1917	1200	Lt. Cyril Bennett (POW); 2/Lt. Herbert Arthur Croft †	2 Sqn.	B.E.2d (6231)	Jasta 11	Albatros D.II	O of Loos
21	14 February 1917	1645	(probably) Capt. George Cyril Bailey DSO (WIA); 2/Lt. George William Betts Hampton (unhurt)	2 Sqn.	B.E.2c (2543)	Jasta 11	Albatros D.II	SW of Mazingarbe; aircraft actually returned to base safely.
22	4 March 1917	1250	Lt. James Benjamin Evelyn Crosbee (unhurt); Sgt. John Edward Prance DCM (WIA)	2 Sqn.	B.E.2d (5785)	Jasta 11	Albatros D.II	1 km N of Loos; aircraft actually returned to base safely.
23	4 March 1917	1620	2/Lt. Herbert John Green †; 2/Lt. Alexander William Reid MC †	43 Sqn.	Sopwith 1½ Strutter (A1108)	Jasta 11	Albatros D.II	Acheville
24	6 March 1917	1700	2/Lt. Gerald Maurice Gosset-Bibby †; Lt. Geoffrey Joseph Ogilvy Brichta CAN †	16 Sqn.	B.E.2e (A2785)	Jasta 11	Albatros D.II	Souchez
25	9 March 1917	1155	Lt. Arthur John Pearson MC †	29 Sqn.	D.H.2 (A2571)	Jasta 11	Albatros D.III	Between Roclincourt and Bailleul
26	11 March 1917	1200	2/Lt. James Smyth †; 2/Lt. Edward Byrne †	2 Sqn.	B.E.2d (6232)	Jasta 11	Halberstadt D.II	S of La Folie Wood
27	17 March 1917	1130	Lt. Arthur Elsdale Boultbee †; 2AM. Frederick King †	25 Sqn.	F.E.2b (A5439)	Jasta 11	Halberstadt D.II	Oppy
28	17 March 1917	1700	2/Lt. George MacDonald Watt †; Sgt. Ernest Adam Howlett †	16 Sqn.	B.E.2g (2814)	Jasta 11	Halberstadt D.II	O of Vimy
29	21 March 1917	1730	F/Sgt. Sidney Herbert Quicke †; 2/Lt. William John Lidsey †	16 Sqn.	B.E.2e (A3154)	Jasta 11	Halberstadt D.II	Hill 123, N of Neuville
30	24 March 1917	1155	Lt. Richard Plunkett Baker CAN (WIA; POW)	19 Sqn.	SPAD VII (A6706)	Jasta 11	Halberstadt D.II	Givenchy
31	25 March 1917	0820	Lt. Christopher Guy Gilbert (POW)	29 Sqn.	Nieuport 17 (A6689)	Jasta 11	Halberstadt D.II	Tilloy
32	2 April 1917	0835	Lt. Patrick John Gordon Powell †; 1AM. Percy Bonner †	13 Sqn.	B.E.2d (5841)	Jasta 11	Albatros D.III(2253/17)	Farbus
33	2 April 1917	1115	2/Lt. Algernon Peter Warren (POW); Sgt. Reuel Dunn †	43 sqn.	Sopwith 1½ Strutter (A2401)	Jasta 11	Albatros D.III(2253/17)	Givenchy
34	3 April 1917	1615	2/Lt. Donald Peter McDonald (POW); 2/Lt. John Ingram Mullaniffe O'Beirne †	25 Sqn.	F.E.2d (A6382)	Jasta 11	Albatros D.III(2253/17)	Between Lens and Liévin
35	5 April 1917	1115	2/Lt. Arthur Norman Lechler (WIA; POW); 2/Lt. Herbert Duncan King George †	48 Sqn.	Bristol F.2a (A3340)	Jasta 11	Albatros D.III(2253/17)	Lewarde, S of Douai
36	5 April 1917	1130	Lts. Alfred Terence Adams (POW); Donald James Stewart (POW)	48 Sqn.	Bristol F.2a (A3343)	Jasta 11	Albatros D.III(2253/17)	Cuincy
37	7 April 1917	1745	2/Lt. George Orme Smart †	60 Sqn.	Nieuport 17 (A6645)	Jasta 11	Albatros D.III(2253/17)	Mercatel
38	8 April 1917	1140	Lts. John Heagerty (POW); Leonard Heath-Cantle †;	43 Sqn.	Sopwith 1½ Strutter (A2406)	Jasta 11	Albatros D.III(2253/17)	Near Farbus
39	8 April 1917	1640	2/Lt. Keith Ingleby MacKenzie †; 2/Lt. Guy Everingham †	16 Sqn.	B.E.2g (A2815)	Jasta 11	Albatros D.III(2253/17)	Vimy
40	11 April 1917	0925	Lt. Edward Claude England Derwin (WIA); Gunner H. Pierson (WIA)	13 Sqn.	B.E.2d (2501)	Jasta 11	Albatros D.III(2253/17)	Willerval-fell inside Allied Lines.
41	13 April 1917	0858	Capt. James Maitland Stuart †; Lt. Maurice Herbert Wood †	59 sqn.	R.E.8 (A3190)	Jasta 11	Albatros D.III(2253/17)	Between Vitry and Brebières
42	13 April 1917	1245	Sgt. James Allen Cunniffe (WIA); 2AM. W.J. Batten; (WIA)	11 Sqn.	F.E.2b (A831)	Jasta 11	Albatros D.III(2253/17)	Between Monchy and Feuchy-crashed Allied side of Lines.
43	13 April 1917	1935	2/Lt. Allan Harold Bates †; Sgt. William Alfred Barnes †	25 Sqn.	F.E.2b (4997)	Jasta 11	Albatros D.III(2253/17)	Noyelles-Godault, near Hénin-Liétard
44	14 April 1917	0915	Lt. William Oswald Russell (POW)	60 Sqn.	Nieuport 17 (A6796)	Jasta 11	Albatros D.III(2253/17)	1 km S of Bois Bernard
45	16 April 1917	1730	2/Lt. Alphonso Pascoe (WIA); 2/Lt. Frederick Seymour Andrews †	13 Sqn.	B.E.2e (3156)	Jasta 11	Albatros D.III(2253/17)	Between Bailleul and Gavrelle-Allied side of Lines.
46	22 April 1917	1710	(possibly) Lt. Waldemar Franklin (WIA); Lt. William Frederick Fletcher; (WIA)	11 Sqn.	F.E.2b (7020)	Jasta 11	Albatros D.III(2253/17)	Near Lagnicourt- one of four FE2b's downed by Jasta 11.
47	23 April 1917	1205	2/Lt. Eric Welch †; Sgt. Amos George Tollervey †	16 Sqn.	B.E.2f (A3168)	Jasta 11	Albatros D.III(2253/17)	Mericourt
48	28 April 1917	0930	Lt. Reginald William Follit †; 2/Lt. Frederick James Kirkham (POW)	13 Sqn.	B.E.2e (7221)	Jasta 11	Albatros D.III(2253/17)	E of Pelves, SE edge of Square 6998
49	29 April 1917	1205	Lt. Richard Applin †	19 Sqn.	SPAD VII (B1573)	Jasta 11	Albatros D.III(2253/17)	Near Lecluse
50	29 April 1917	1655	Sgt. George Stead †; Cpl. Alfred Beebee †	18 sqn.	F.E.2b (4898)	Jasta 11	Albatros D.III(2253/17)	SW of Inchy, Hill 90, near Pariville
51	29 April 1917	1925	Lt. David Evan Davies †; Lt. George Henry Rathbone CAN †	12 Sqn.	B.E.2e (2738)	Jasta 11	Albatros D.III(2253/17)	Near Roeux
52	29 April 1917	1940	Flt. Sub-Lt Albert Edward Cuzner CAN †	8 RNAS	Sopwith Triplane (N5463)	Jasta 11	Albatros D.III(2253/17)	Between Billy-Montigny and Sallaumines over Vimy
53	18 June 1917	1315	Lt. Ralph Walter Elley Ellis †; Lt. Harold Carver Barlow †	9 Sqn.	R.E.8 (A4290)	JG I	Albatros D.V(789/17) (D5a?)	Hof Struywe, Square V.42
54?	23 June 1917	2130	(possibly) Lt. Robert Wallace Farquhar (unhurt)	23 Sqn.	SPAD VII (B1530)	JG I	Albatros D.V(1177/17)	N of Ypres- landed back at base at La Lovie, slightly damaged.
55	24 June 1917	0910	Capt. Norman George McNaughton MC †; Lt. Angus Hughes Mearns †	57 Sqn.	D.H.4 (A7473)	JG I	Albatros D.V(1177/17)	Between Keibergmolen (former windmill, located in Beselare) and Lichtensteinlager.
56	25 June 1917	1840	Lt. Leslie Spencer Bowman †; 2/Lt. James Edward Power-Clutterbuck †	53 Sqn.	R.E.8 (A3847)	JG I	Albatros D.V(1177/17)	Near Le Bizet
57	2 July 1917	1020	Sgt. Hubert Arthur Whatley †; 2/Lt. Frank Guy Buckingham Pascoe †	53 Sqn.	R.E.8 (A3538)	JG I	Albatros D.V(1177/17)	Deulemont
58	16 August 1917	0755	2/Lt. William Harold Trant Williams (WIA; POW; † from wounds)	29 Sqn.	Nieuport 23 (A6611)	JG I	Albatros D.V(2059/17)	Near Polygon Wood
59	26 August 1917	0730	2/Lt. Coningsby Phillip Williams †	19 Sqn.	SPAD VII (B3492)	JG I	Albatros D.V(2059/17)	Between Poelcapelle and Langemarck
60	1 September 1917	0750	Lt. John Bristo Culley Madge (WIA/POW); 2/Lt. Walter Kember †	6 Sqn.	R.E.8 (B782)	JG I	Fokker F.I(102/17)	Near Zonnebeke
61	3 September 1917	0735	Lt. Algernon Frederick Bird (POW)	46 Sqn.	Sopwith Pup (B1795)	JG I	Fokker F.I (102/17)	S of Bousbecque
62	23 November 1917	1400	Lt. James Alexander Vazeill Boddy (WIA)	64 Sqn.	D.H.5 (A9299)	JG I	Albatros D.V(4693/17)	SE edge of Bourlon Wood-rescued from no-mans land
63	30 November 1917	1430	Lt. Donald Argyle Douglas Ian MacGregor †	41 Sqn.	S.E.5a (B644)	JG I	Albatros D.V(4963/17)	Near Mœuvres. Noted elsewhere (Gibbons) as 56 Sqn's Capt. P.T. Townsend. However, Townsend was downed 15.45 some 34 km further north west.
64	12 March 1918	1110–1115	2/Lt. Leonard Frederick Cyril Clutterbuck (POW); 2/Lt Henry James Sparks MC; (POW)	62 Sqn.	Bristol F.2b (B1251)	JG I	Fokker Dr.I(152/17)	N of Nauroy, Square 2858
65	13 March 1918	1035	Lt. Elmer Ernest Heath CAN (WIA/POW)	73 Sqn.	Sopwith Camel (B2523)	JG I	Fokker DR.I (152/17)	Between Gonnelieu and Banteux, Square 1853
66	18 March 1918	1115	2/Lt. William George Ivamy CAN (POW)	54 Sqn.	Sopwith Camel (B5243)	JG I	Fokker DR.I (477/17)	road Molain–Vaux-Andigny
67	24 March 1918	1445	Lt. John Percy McCone CAN †; OR Lt. Donald Cecil Tucker (WIA/POW)	both 41 Sqn.	S.E.5a (C1054 or C6399)	JG I	Fokker DR.I(477/17)	Combles; Gibbons listed Lt. W Porter of 56 Sqn, although he was killed an hour earlier versus Jasta 34b. As Richthofen's combat report states the enemy aircraft disintegrated, McCone would be the more likely victim.
68	25 March 1918	1555	2/Lt. Donald Cameron †	3 Sqn.	Sopwith Camel (C1562)	JG I	Fokker DR.I(477/17)	road Bapaume–Albert
69	26 March 1918	1645	(possibly) Lt. Allan McNab Denovan CAN †	1 Sqn.	S.E.5a (B511)	JG I	Fokker DR.I(477/17)	S of Contalmaison. Several other victims have been postulated over the years, but Donovan is the best fit for time and location. These others include Lt W Knox (54 Sqn), who was actually killed two days earlier, Lt ATW Lindsay (54 Sqn), who was lost two hours earlier, and one of two 19 Sqn. Sopwith Dolphins lost that day.
70	26 March 1918	1700	2/Lt. Vernon Jack Reading †; 2/Lt. Matthew Leggat †	15 Sqn.	R.E.8 (B742)	JG I	Fokker DR.I(477/17)	2 km NE of Albert, Somme
71	27 March 1918	0900	Capt.Thomas Sydney Sharpe DFC (WIA/POW)	73 Sqn.	Sopwith Camel (C6733)	JG I	Fokker DR.I (127/17)	Ancre, 1 km N of Aveluy, N of Albert
72	27 March 1918	1630	Lt. Edward Treloar Smart; 2/Lt. Kenneth Purnell Barford	2 Sqn.	A/W F.K.8 (B288)	JG I	Fokker DR.I(477/17)	2 km O of Foucaucourt. (Some sources suggest that this may have been a DH-4 of 5 RNAS.)
73	27 March 1918	1635	2/Lt. George Halliwell Harding USA †	79 Sqn.	Sopwith Dolphin (C4016)	JG I	Fokker DR.I (477/17)	1 km N of Chuignolles, S of Bray-sur-Somme
74	28 March 1918	1220	2/Lts. Joseph Bertram Taylor †; 2/Lt. Eric Betley †	82 Sqn.	A/W F.K.8 (C8444)	JG I	Fokker DR.I (127/17)	Near Mericourt
75	2 April 1918	1230	2/Lt. Ernest David Jones †; 2/Lt. Robert Francis Newton †	52 Sqn.	R.E.8 (A3868)	JG I	Fokker DR.I (477/17)	Hill 104, NE of Moreuil
76	6 April 1918	1545	Capt.Sydney Philip Smith (MIA)	46 Sqn.	Sopwith Camel (D6491)	JG I	Fokker DR.I(127/17)	NE of Villers-Bretonneux, near the E edge of Bois de Hamel
77	7 April 1918	1130	2/Lt. Albert Vernon Gallie	73 Sqn.	Sopwith Camel (D6550)	JG I	Fokker DR.I (477/17)	Near Hangard
78?	7 April 1918	1205	(possibly) Lt. Ronald George Hinings Adams (WIA/POW)	73 Sqn.	Sopwith Camel (D6554)	JG I	Fokker DR.I(477/17)	500m E of Hill 104, N of Villers-Bretonneux. (Possibly a different Camel from 73 Sqn; three were lost.)
79	20 April 1918	1840	Major Richard Raymond-Barker MC †	3 Sqn.	Sopwith Camel (D6439)	JG I	Fokker DR.I(425/17)	SO of Bois de Hamel
80	20 April 1918	1843	2/Lt. David Greswolde Lewis (Rhodesia) RHO (POW)	3 Sqn.	Sopwith Camel (B7393)	JG I	Fokker DR.I (425/17)	NE of Villers-Bretonneux

The Aerodrome n.d.

== Bibliography ==
- Franks, Norman; Giblin, Hal; McCrery, Nigel (2007) [1995]. Under the Guns of the Red Baron – The Complete Record of Von Richthofen's Victories and Victims Fully Illustrated. London/New York: Grub Street/Caxton/Barnes & Noble. p. 224. ISBN 978-0-7607-1209-2.
- Gibbons, Floyd (1930). The Red Knight of Germany. Mount Pleasant, SC: Arcadia Press (last published 2016). ISBN 978-1-5413-7451-5.
- Shores, Christopher F.; Franks, Norman; Guest, Russell F. (1990). Above the Trenches: a Complete Record of the Fighter Aces and Units of the British Empire Air Forces 1915–1920. London, UK: Grub Street. ISBN 978-0-948817-19-9.
