= Manfred von Richthofen =

German World War I flying ace (1892–1918)

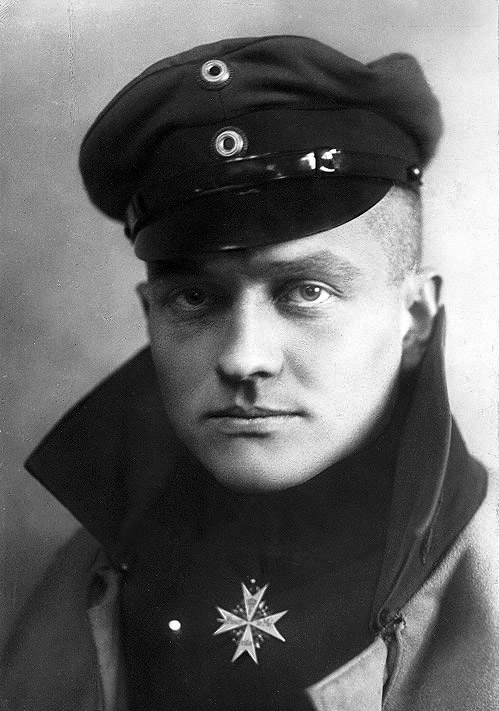
- Richthofen wears the Pour le Mérite, the "Blue Max", Prussia's highest military order, in this official portrait, c. 1917.
- Born: Manfred Albrecht von Richthofen; 2 May 1892; Kleinburg near Breslau, Province of Silesia, Kingdom of Prussia
- Died: 21 April 1918 (aged 25); Vaux-sur-Somme, French Third Republic
- Burial place: South Cemetery, Wiesbaden, Germany; 50°3′36.94″N 8°15′56.92″E
- Military career
- Allegiance: Kingdom of Prussia; German Empire
- Branch: Prussian Army (1911–14); Imperial German Army (1914–18); Luftstreitkräfte (1915–18)
- Service years: 1911–1918
- Rank: Rittmeister (Captain)
- Nickname: "The Red Baron"
- Commands: Jasta 11; Jagdgeschwader I
- Battles: First World War; Eastern Front; Western Front; Battle of the Lys †
- Awards: Pour le Mérite; Order of the Red Eagle; House Order of Hohenzollern; Iron Cross

Rittmeister Manfred Albrecht Freiherr von Richthofen (German: [ˈmanfreːt fɔn ˈʁɪçthoːfn̩]; 2 May 1892 – 21 April 1918), known in English as Baron von Richthofen or the Red Baron, was a German fighter pilot with the German Air Force during World War I. He is considered the ace-of-aces of the war, being officially credited with 80 air combat victories.

Originally a cavalryman, Richthofen, discovered by Oswald Boelcke, transferred to the Air Service in 1915, becoming one of the first members of the fighter squadron Jagdstaffel 2 in 1916. He quickly distinguished himself as a fighter pilot, and during 1917, he became the leader of Jasta 11. He eventually rose to command the larger fighter wing Jagdgeschwader I, better known as "the Flying Circus" or "Richthofen's Circus" because of the bright colours of its aircraft and perhaps also because of the way the unit was transferred from one area of Entente air activity to another – moving like a travelling circus with their aircraft loaded on railroad flatcars and frequently setting up in tents on improvised airfields. A master tactician and an effective leader, Richthofen became famous due to the mystique of his scarlet planes and was regarded as a national hero in Germany; he also inspired fear and respect in his enemies.

Richthofen was shot down and killed over France near Vaux-sur-Somme on 21 April 1918. Discussion and debate regarding aspects of his career have been considerable, especially the circumstances of his death. He remains one of the most famous fighter pilots of all time and has been the subject of many books, films, and other media, usually with his Red Baron moniker and flying his signature red Fokker Dr.I.

== Name and nicknames ==
Richthofen was a Freiherr (literally "Free Lord"), a title of nobility often translated as "baron". That is not a given name nor strictly a hereditary title, since all male members of the family were entitled to it, even during the lifetime of their father. (Note: For example, his brother Lothar also used it.) Richthofen painted his aircraft red, which, combined with his title, led to him being called the "Red Baron" (der Rote Baron), both inside and outside Germany. During his lifetime, he was more frequently described in German as der Rote Kampfflieger. That was variously translated as "the Red Battle Flyer" or "the Red Fighter Pilot" and was the name used as the title of Richthofen's 1917 autobiography.

== Early life ==
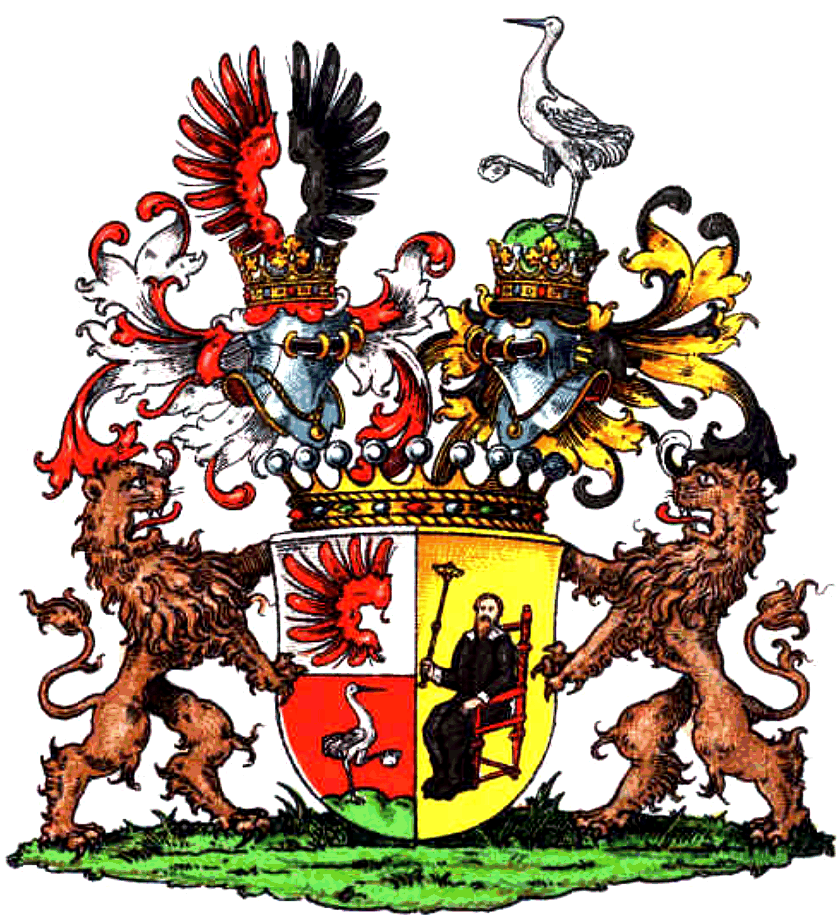
Richthofen family coat of arms

Richthofen was born in Kleinburg, near Breslau, Lower Silesia (now part of the city of Wrocław, Poland), on 2 May 1892 into a prominent Prussian aristocratic family. His father was Major Albrecht Philipp Karl Julius Freiherr von Richthofen, and his mother was Kunigunde von Schickfuss und Neudorff. He had an elder sister, Ilse, and two younger brothers, of which, Lothar von Richthofen became a fellow fighting ace, and his other brother, Bolko von Richthofen, went on to marry and name his son after Manfred.

When he was four years old, Manfred moved with his family to nearby Schweidnitz (now Świdnica, Poland). He enjoyed riding horses and hunting. He was also fond of gymnastics; he excelled at parallel bars and won a number of awards at school. His brothers, Lothar and Bolko, (Note: Not to be confused with Bolko von Richthofen the archaeologist, a distant cousin) and he hunted wild boar, elk, birds, and deer.

After being educated at home, he attended a school at Schweidnitz for a year before beginning cadet training at the Wahlstatt (now Legnickie Pole, Poland) military school in 1903 when he was 11. After completing cadet training in Wahlstaat in 1909, he transferred to the Groß-Lichterfelde Preußische Hauptkadettenanstalt for the next two years. He joined an Uhlan cavalry unit, the Ulanen-Regiment Kaiser Alexander der III. von Russland (1. Westpreußisches) Nr. 1 ("1st Emperor Alexander III of Russia Uhlan Regiment (1st West Prussian)") in Militsch on 27 April 1911 as an officer candidate (Fahnenjunker) and, after having been commissioned in November 1912, was assigned to the regiment's 3. Eskadron ("No. 3 Squadron") in Ostrowo.

== Early war work ==
When World War I began, Richthofen served as a cavalry reconnaissance officer on both the Eastern and Western Fronts, seeing action in Russia, France, and Belgium; with the advent of trench warfare, which made traditional cavalry operations outdated and inefficient, Richthofen's regiment was dismounted, serving as dispatch runners and field telephone operators. Disappointed and bored at not being able to directly participate in combat, the last straw for Richthofen was an order to transfer to the army's supply branch. His interest in the Air Service had been aroused by his examination of a German military aircraft behind the lines, and he applied for a transfer to Die Fliegertruppen des deutschen Kaiserreiches (Imperial German Army Air Service), later to be known as the Luftstreitkräfte. He was widely reported to have written in his application for transfer, "I have not gone to war in order to collect cheese and eggs, but for another purpose." (Note: Richthofen quotes this famous piece of insubordination in his autobiography, but hints that he did not actually write it – claiming that "evil tongues" report that he did.) His request was granted, and Richthofen joined the flying service at the end of May 1915, training as an aerial observer at Großenhain.

From June to August 1915, Richthofen served as an observer on reconnaissance missions over the Eastern Front with Feldflieger Abteilung 69 ("No. 69 Flying Squadron"). In August 1915, he was transferred to a flying unit in Ostend, a coastal city in Belgium. There, he flew with a friend and fellow pilot Georg Zeumer, who would later teach him to fly solo. In September 1915 on being transferred to Brieftauben Abteilung Ostende (B.A.O) on the Champagne Front and assigned to Pilot Henning von Osterroth, he is believed to have shot down an attacking French Farman aircraft aboard an Albatros C.I with his observer's machine gun in a tense battle over French lines; he was not credited with the kill, since it fell behind Allied lines, so could not be confirmed.

== Piloting career ==
"I had been told the name of the place to which we were to fly, and I was to direct the pilot. At first, we flew straight ahead, then the pilot turned to the right, then left. I had lost all sense of direction over our own aerodrome! ... I didn't care a bit where I was, and when the pilot thought it was time to go down, I was disappointed. Already I was counting down the hours to the time we could start again."

— John Simpson, quoting Richthofen's own description of his first flying experience.

Manfred von Richthofen had a chance meeting with German ace fighter pilot Oswald Boelcke, which led him to enter training as a pilot in October 1915. In February 1916, Manfred "rescued" his brother Lothar from the boredom of training new troops in Lüben and encouraged him to transfer to the Fliegertruppe. The next month, Manfred joined Kampfgeschwader 2 ("No. 2 Fighter Squadron") flying a two-seater Albatros C.III. Initially, he appeared to be a below-average pilot. He struggled to control his aircraft, and he crashed during his first flight at the controls. Despite this poor start, he rapidly became attuned to his aircraft. He was over Verdun on 26 April 1916 and fired on a French Nieuport, shooting it down over Fort Douaumont—although he received no official credit. A week later, he decided to ignore more experienced pilots' advice against flying through a thunderstorm. He later noted that he had been "lucky to get through the weather" and vowed never again to fly in such conditions unless ordered to do so.

Richthofen met Oswald Boelcke again in August 1916, after another spell flying two-seaters on the Eastern Front. Boelcke was visiting the east in search of candidates for his newly formed Jasta 2, and he selected Richthofen to join this unit, one of the first German fighter squadrons. Boelcke was killed during a midair collision with a friendly aircraft on 28 October 1916, and Richthofen witnessed the event.

Richthofen scored his first confirmed victory when he engaged Second Lieutenant Lionel Morris and his observer Tom Rees in the skies over Cambrai, France, on 17 September 1916. His autobiography states, "I honoured the fallen enemy by placing a stone on his beautiful grave." Von Richthofen then contacted a jeweller in Berlin and ordered a silver cup engraved with the date and the type of enemy aircraft. (Note: Similar cups had been officially awarded to some earlier pilots on their first victories, although the practice had been discontinued by this time.) He continued to celebrate each of his victories in the same manner until he had 60 cups, by which time the dwindling supply of silver in blockaded Germany meant that silver cups could no longer be supplied. Richthofen discontinued his orders at this stage, rather than accept cups made from base metal. (Note: Burrows has suggested that he was simply bored with the procedure and that this was an excuse to discontinue it.)

His brother Lothar (40 victories) used risky, aggressive tactics, but Manfred observed maxims known as the Dicta Boelcke to assure success for both the squadron and its pilots. He was not a spectacular or aerobatic pilot like his brother or Werner Voss, but he was a noted tactician and squadron leader and a fine marksman. Typically, he would dive from above to attack with the advantage of the sun behind him, with other pilots of his squadron covering his rear and flanks.

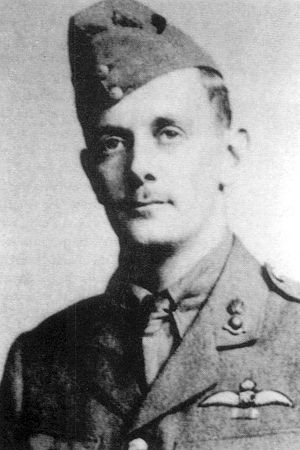
Major Lanoe Hawker VC

On 23 November 1916, Richthofen shot down his most famous adversary, British ace Major Lanoe Hawker VC, described by Richthofen as "the British Boelcke". The victory came while Richthofen was flying an Albatros D.II and Hawker was flying the older DH.2. After a long dogfight, Hawker was shot in the back of the head as he attempted to escape back to his own lines. After this combat, Richthofen was convinced that he needed a fighter aircraft with more agility, even with a loss of speed. He switched to the Albatros D.III in January 1917, scoring two victories before suffering an in-flight crack in the spar of the aircraft's lower wing on 24 January, and he reverted to the Albatros D.II or Halberstadt D.II for the next five weeks.

Richthofen was flying his Halberstadt on 6 March in combat with F.E.8s of 40 Squadron RFC, when his aircraft was shot through the fuel tank by Edwin Benbow, who was credited with a victory from this fight. Richthofen was able to make a forced landing near Hénin-Liétard without his aircraft catching fire. He then scored a victory in the Albatros D.II on 9 March, but his Albatros D.III was grounded for the rest of the month, so he switched again to a Halberstadt D.II. He returned to his Albatros D.III on 2 April 1917 and scored 22 victories in it before switching to the Albatros D.V in late June.

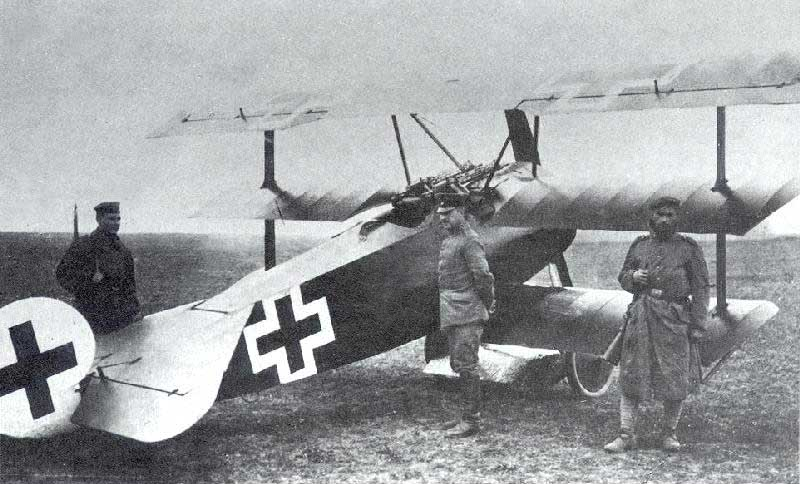
Richthofen's all-red Fokker Dr.I

Richthofen flew the celebrated Fokker Dr.I triplane from late August 1917, the distinctive three-winged aircraft with which he is most commonly associated—although he did not use the type exclusively until after it was reissued with strengthened wings in November. Only 19 of his 80 kills were made in this type of aircraft, despite the popular link between Richthofen and the Fokker Dr.I. His Albatros D.III Serial No. 789/16 was the first to be painted bright red, in late January 1917, and in which he first earned his name and reputation.

Richthofen championed the development of the Fokker D.VII with suggestions to overcome the deficiencies of the then-current German fighter aircraft. He never had an opportunity to fly the new type in combat, as he was killed before it entered service.

== Flying Circus ==
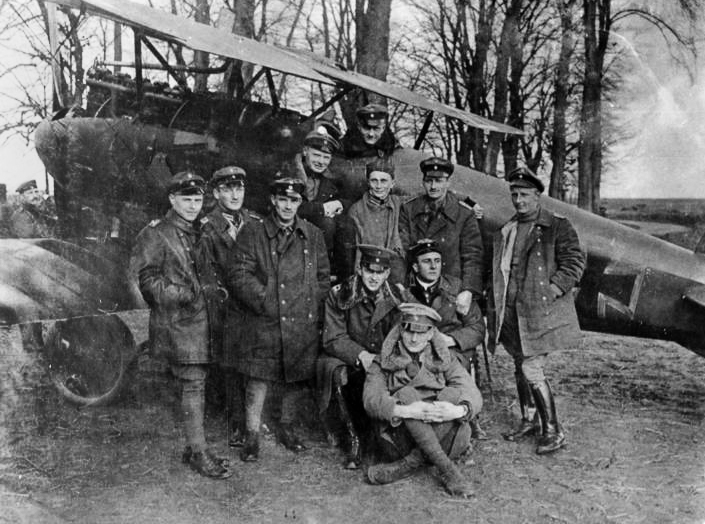
Richthofen in the cockpit of his famous Rotes Flugzeug ("Red Aircraft") with other members of Jasta 11, including his brother Lothar (sitting, front), 23 April 1917

Richthofen received the Pour le Mérite in January 1917 after his 16th confirmed kill, the highest military honour in Germany at the time and informally known as "the Blue Max". That same month, he assumed command of Jasta 11, which ultimately included some of the elite German pilots, many of whom he trained himself, and several of whom later became leaders of their own squadrons. Ernst Udet belonged to Richthofen's group and later became Generaloberst Udet. When Lothar joined, the German high command appreciated the propaganda value of two Richthofens fighting together to defeat the enemy in the air.

Richthofen took the flamboyant step of having his Albatros painted red when he became a squadron commander. He wrote in his autobiography: "For whatever reasons, one fine day I came upon the idea of having my crate painted glaring red. The result was that absolutely everyone could not help but notice my red bird. In fact, my opponents also seemed to be not entirely unaware [of it]". During an unexpected visit home on February 4, he explained to his mother (who opined that painting his machine red was rather frivolous) that the main reason for doing so was to be seen by his men at all times. She also recalled that the legendary hero Dietrich von Bern went into battle bearing a fire-red shield, in a display of courage and force, further reinforcing her son's choice. She asked her son why he risked his life every day, and he said: "For the man in the trenches. I want to ease his hard lot in life by keeping the enemy flyers away from him." Author A. E. Ferko suggests Richthofen was inspired by the French ace Jean Navarre who was renowned for his flamboyant red Nieuport. Thereafter, he usually flew in red-painted aircraft, although not all of them were entirely red, nor was the "red" necessarily the brilliant scarlet beloved of model- and replica-builders.

Other members of Jasta 11 soon took to painting parts of their aircraft red. Their official reason seems to have been to make their leader less conspicuous, to avoid having him singled out in a fight. In practice, red colouration became a unit identification. Other units soon adopted their own squadron colours, and decoration of fighters became general throughout the Luftstreitkräfte. The German high command permitted this practice (in spite of obvious drawbacks from the point of view of intelligence), and German propaganda made much of it by referring to Richthofen as Der Rote Kampfflieger—"the Red Fighter Pilot".

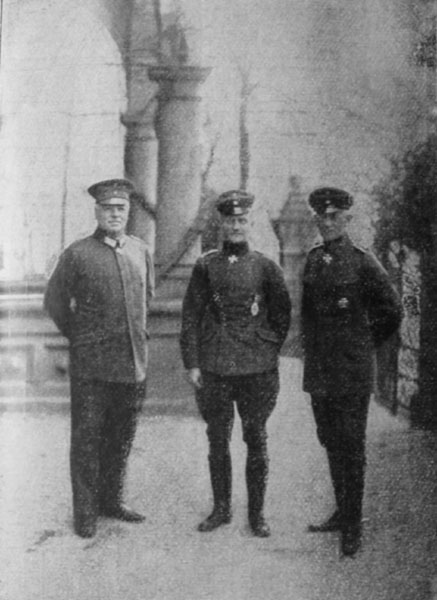
Richthofen (centre) with Hermann Thomsen, German Air Service Chief of Staff (left) and Ernst von Hoeppner, Commanding General of the Air Service (right) at Imperial Headquarters in Bad Kreuznach

Richthofen led his new unit to unparalleled success, peaking during "Bloody April" 1917. In that month alone, he shot down 22 British aircraft, including four in a single day, raising his official tally to 52. By June, he had become the commander of the first of the new larger "fighter wing" formations; these were highly mobile, combined tactical units that could move at short notice to different parts of the front as required. Richthofen's new command, Jagdgeschwader 1, was composed of fighter squadrons No. 4, 6, 10, and 11. J.G. 1 became widely known as "the Flying Circus" due to the unit's brightly coloured aircraft and its mobility, including the use of tents, trains, and caravans, where appropriate.

Richthofen was a brilliant tactician, building on Boelcke's tactics. Unlike Boelcke, however, he led by example and force of will rather than by inspiration. He was often described as distant, unemotional, and rather humorless, though some colleagues contended otherwise. He was cordial to officers and enlisted men alike; indeed, he urged his pilots to remain on good terms with the mechanics who maintained their aircraft. He taught his pilots the basic rule by which he wanted them to fight: "Aim for the man and don't miss him. If you are fighting a two-seater, get the observer first; until you have silenced the gun, don't bother about the pilot."

Although Richthofen was now performing the duties of a lieutenant colonel (a wing commander in modern Royal Air Force terms), he was never promoted past the relatively junior rank of Rittmeister, equivalent to captain in the British army. The system in the British army was for an officer to hold the rank appropriate to his level of command, if only on a temporary basis, even if he had not been formally promoted. In the German army, holding a lower rank than his duties implied was not unusual for a wartime officer; German officers were promoted according to a schedule and not by battlefield promotion. Another custom was for a son not to hold a higher rank than his father, and Richthofen's father was a reserve major.

=== Wounded in combat ===
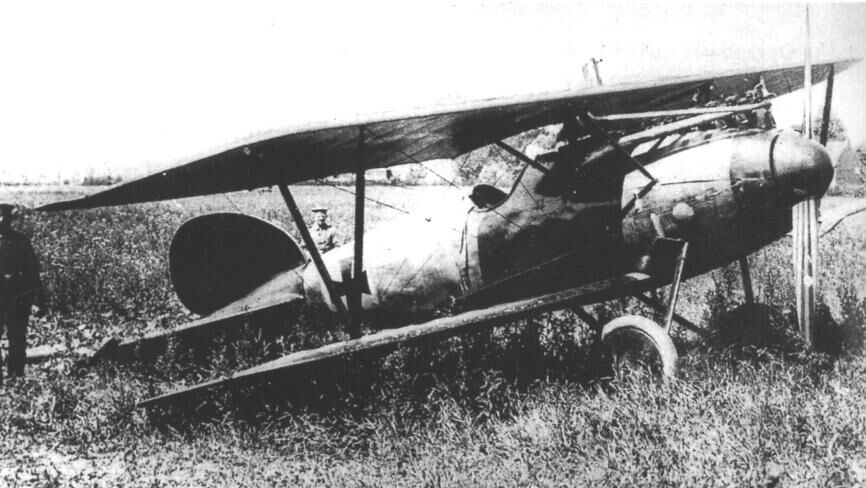
Richthofen's Albatros D.V after forced landing near Wervik. This machine is not an all-red one.

Richthofen sustained a serious head wound on 6 July 1917, during combat near Wervik, Belgium, against a formation of F.E.2d two-seat fighters of No. 20 Squadron RFC, causing instant disorientation and temporary partial blindness. He regained his vision in time to ease the aircraft out of a spin and execute a forced landing in a field in friendly territory. The injury required multiple operations to remove bone splinters from the impact area. (Note: The air victory was credited to Captain Donald Cunnell of No. 20, who was killed by German antiaircraft fire a few days later (12 July 1917) near Wervik; Cunnell's observer, Lt. A. G. Bill, successfully flew the aircraft back to base. Author A. E. Ferko notes that Richthofen's wound was on the rear side of his head, behind his left ear, when Richthofen and Cunnell's aircraft were heading towards each other from the front. He suggests Richthofen may have been injured accidentally by one of his fellow pilots.)

The Red Baron returned to active service against doctor's orders on 25 July, but took convalescent leave from 5 September to 23 October. His wound is thought to have caused lasting damage; he later often suffered from post-flight nausea and headaches, as well as a change in temperament. One theory (see below) links this injury to his eventual death.

== Writings and hero status ==
Thoughts in a Dug-Out

In my dug-out, there hangs from the ceiling a lamp that I had made from a [rotary] aircraft engine. It came from an aeroplane that I had shot down. I mounted light bulbs in the cylinders and at night, when I lie awake and let the light burn, Lords knows, this chandelier on the ceiling looks fantastic and weird enough. When I lie like that I have much to think about.

I write this down without knowing whether anyone other than my closet relatives will ever see [it]. I am thinking about doing a continuation of Der rote Kampfflieger and, indeed, for quite a good reason. The battle now taking place on all Fronts has become dreadfully serious; there is nothing left of the "lively, merry war," as our deeds were called in the beginning. Now we must arm ourselves against despair so that the enemy will not violate our country.

I now have the deepest impression that from [the image of] the "red battle flier", people have been exposed to quite another Richthofen that I am truly deep inside of myself. When I read [my] book, I smile at my own insolence. I no longer so insolent in spirit. Not because I can imagine how it would be one day when death is breathing down my neck; surely not for that reason, although I have thought about it often enough that it can happen. I have been told by [people in] high places that I should give up flying, for one day it will catch up with me. I would be miserable with myself if now, burdened with glory and decorations, I were to become a pensioner of my own dignity in order to save my precious life for the nation, while every poor fellow in the trenches endures his duty as I do mine.

I am in wretched spirits after every aerial combat. But that is surely one of the consequences of my head wound. When I put my foot on the ground again at the airfield, I go [directly] to my four walls, I do not want to see anyone or hear anything. I believe that [the war] is not as the people at home imagine it, with a hurrah and a roar; it is very serious, very grim.

— Manfred von Richthofen

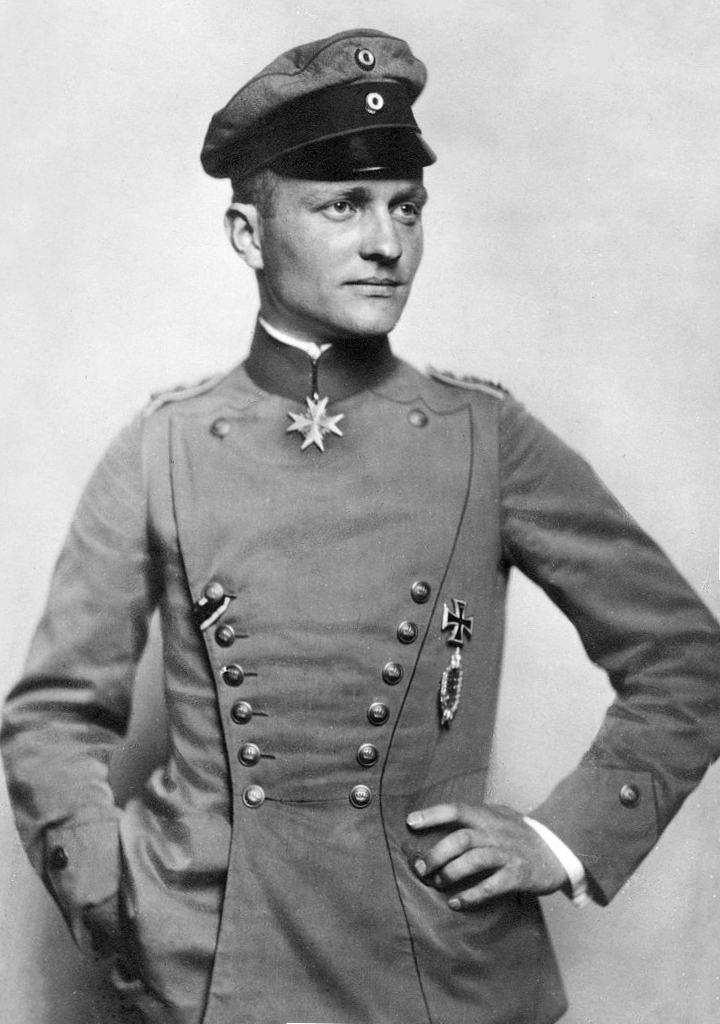
Portrait by Nicola Perscheid

During his convalescent leave, Richthofen completed an autobiographic sketch, Der rote Kampfflieger (The Red Battle Flyer, 1917). Written on the instructions of the "Press and Intelligence" (propaganda) section of the Luftstreitkräfte (Air Force), it shows evidence of having been heavily censored and edited. There are, however, passages that are most unlikely to have been inserted by an official editor. Richthofen wrote: "My father discriminates between a sportsman and a butcher. The latter shoots for fun. When I have shot down an Englishman, my hunting passion is satisfied for a quarter of an hour. Therefore I do not succeed in shooting down two Englishmen in succession. If one of them comes down, I have the feeling of complete satisfaction. Only much later have I overcome my instinct and have become a butcher". In another passage, Richthofen indicated that following his head wound, he became somewhat depressed and secluded himself from everyone else, after battle. An English translation by J. Ellis Barker was published in 1918 as The Red Battle Flyer. Although Richthofen died before a revised version could be prepared, he is on record as repudiating the book, stating that he was "no longer so insolent".

By 1918, Richthofen had developed such a legendary reputation that some feared his death would be a blow to the morale of the German people. He refused to accept a ground job after his wound, stating that "every poor fellow in the trenches must do his duty" and that he would therefore continue to fly in combat. Certainly, he had become part of a cult of officially encouraged hero-worship. German propaganda circulated various false rumours, including that the British had raised squadrons specially to hunt Richthofen and had offered large rewards and an automatic Victoria Cross to any Entente pilot who shot him down. Passages from his correspondence indicate he may have at least half-believed some of these stories himself.

=== Personal life ===
Richthofen never married and had no children. While recovering from his head wound, Richthofen was placed in the care of Nurse Käte Oltersdorf (1891–1988). During one of his brief visits from hospital to Jagdgeschwader 1, he was accompanied by Oltersdorf. Bodenschatz recalled that Oltersdorf "paid little notice that the Rittmeister grimaced. Showing up at an aviation facility with a nurse was not at all to his liking...(she) declared sternly that if the Rittmeister should try to make any mischief with his head still not completely healed, she would be there."

On 18 October 1917, Richthofen attended the wedding of friend Fritz Prestein and was mistakenly reported by a confused local journalist to be the bridegroom; the story made headlines all over Germany. Richthofen wrote his father to assure him the story was false and said that his dedication to duty and country kept him from pursuing any romantic pursuits. Richthofen's mother later stated after her son's death that Richthofen had a secret love that he planned to marry after the war. Oltersdorf's family would later claim that Richthofen and Oltersdorf were planning to marry after the war and that Oltersdorf was distraught by his death.

== Death ==
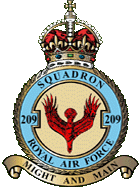
209 Squadron Badge – the red eagle falling – symbolizes the fall of the Red Baron.

Richthofen received a fatal wound just after 11:00 am on 21 April 1918, a few days prior to the Second Battle of Villers-Bretonneux, while flying over Morlancourt Ridge near the Somme River, 49°56′0.60″N 2°32′43.71″E. At the time, he had been pursuing, at very low altitude, a Sopwith Camel piloted by Canadian novice Wilfrid Reid "Wop" May of No. 209 Squadron, Royal Air Force. May had just fired on the Red Baron's cousin, Lieutenant Wolfram von Richthofen. On seeing his cousin being attacked, Richthofen flew to his rescue and fired on May, causing him to pull away. Richthofen pursued May across the Somme. The Baron was spotted and briefly attacked by a Camel piloted by May's school friend and flight commander, Canadian Captain Arthur "Roy" Brown. Brown had to dive steeply at very high speed to intervene, and then had to climb steeply to avoid hitting the ground. Richthofen turned to avoid this attack, and then resumed his pursuit of May.

Almost certainly during this final stage in his pursuit of May, a single .303 bullet (Note: The actual bullet lodged in Richthofen's clothing. It was apparently recovered, but it has not been preserved for examination by modern historians. It was apparently a normal ball round, as fired by all British rifle-calibre arms, and thus would not be any help in resolving the controversy of who fired it.) hit Richthofen through the chest, severely damaging his heart and lungs; it would have killed Richthofen in less than a minute. His aircraft stalled and went into a steep dive, hitting the ground at 49°55′56″N 2°32′16″E in a field on a hill near the Bray-Corbie road, just north of the village of Vaux-sur-Somme, in a sector defended by the Australian Imperial Force (AIF). The aircraft bounced heavily upon hitting the ground; the undercarriage collapsed and the fuel tank was smashed before the aircraft skidded to a stop. Several witnesses, including Gunner George Ridgway, reached the crashed plane and found Richthofen already dead. His face had slammed into the butts of his machine guns, breaking his nose, fracturing his jaw, and creating contusions on his face. (Note: Gunner Ernest W. Twycross, and Sergeant Ted Smout of the Australian Medical Corps later claimed that Richthofen was still alive and tried to say something, with the last or only word being "kaputt", before he died. The definition of "kaputt" is often in contention. This is disputed by some accounts, which reported that Richthofen was already dead and the nature of his wound, as well as his broken nose and fractured jaw.)

Australian soldiers and airmen examine the remnants of Richthofen's triplane.

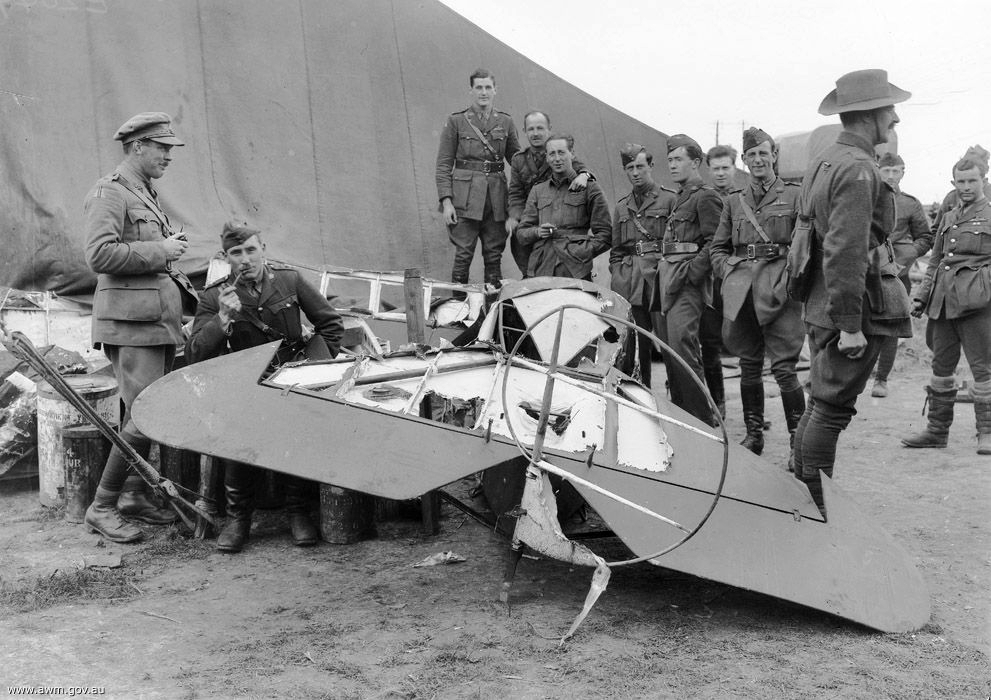
Australian airmen with Richthofen's triplane 425/17 after it was looted by souvenir hunters

No. 3 Squadron, Australian Flying Corps was the nearest Entente air unit and assumed responsibility for the Baron's remains. His Fokker Dr.I 425/17 was soon taken apart by souvenir hunters.

In 2009, Richthofen's death certificate was found in the archives in Ostrów Wielkopolski, Poland. He had briefly been stationed in Ostrów before going to war, as it was part of Germany until the end of World War I. The document is a one-page, handwritten form in a 1918 registry book of deaths. It misspells Richthofen's name as "Richthoven" and simply states that he had "died 21 April 1918, from wounds sustained in combat".

=== Debate over who fired the shot that killed Richthofen ===
Controversy and contradictory hypotheses continue to surround who actually fired the shot that killed Richthofen.

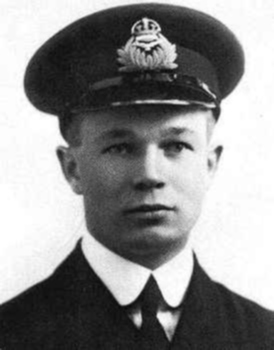
Arthur Roy Brown

The RAF credited Brown with shooting down the Red Baron, but it is now generally agreed by historians, doctors, and ballistics experts that Richthofen was actually killed by an anti-aircraft (AA) machine gunner firing from the ground. A post mortem examination of the body showed the bullet that killed Richthofen penetrated from the right underarm and exited next to the left nipple. Brown's attack was probably from behind and above Richthofen's left. Even more conclusively, Richthofen could not have continued his pursuit of May for as long as he did (up to two minutes) had his wound come from Brown. Brown himself never spoke much about what happened that day, (Note: Sensational accounts have been systematically discredited by several writers, even though they describe the attack in great detail and are allegedly given by Brown.) claiming, "There is no point in me commenting, as the evidence is already out there."

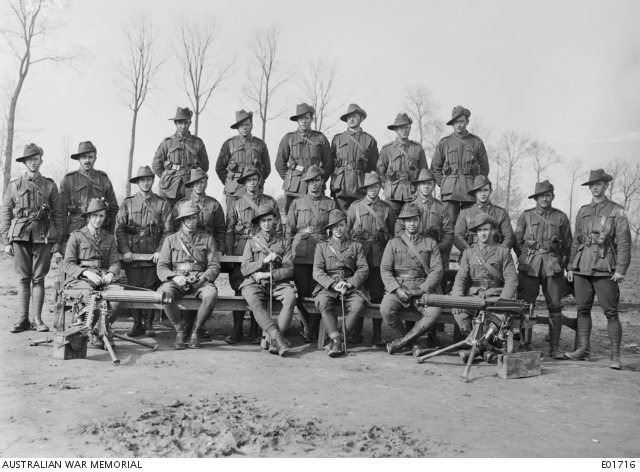
Officers and NCOs of the 24th Machine Gun Company in March 1918: Sergeant Cedric Popkin is second from the right in the middle row.

Many sources have suggested that Sergeant Cedric Popkin was the person most likely to have killed Richthofen, including a 1998 article by Geoffrey Miller, a physician and historian of military medicine, and a 2002 edition of the British Channel 4 Secret History series. Popkin was an AA machine gunner with the Australian 24th Machine Gun Company, and he was using a Vickers gun. He fired at Richthofen's aircraft on two occasions, first as the Baron was heading straight at his position, and then at long range from the plane's right. Given the nature of Richthofen's wounds, Popkin was in a position to fire the fatal shot when the pilot passed him for a second time. Some confusion has been caused by a letter that Popkin wrote in 1935 to an Australian official historian. It stated Popkin's belief that he had fired the fatal shot as Richthofen flew straight at his position. In this respect, Popkin was incorrect; the bullet that caused the Baron's death came from the side (see above).

A 2002 Discovery Channel documentary suggests that Gunner W. J. "Snowy" Evans, a Lewis machine gunner with the 53rd Battery, 14th Field Artillery Brigade, Royal Australian Artillery is likely to have killed von Richthofen. Miller and the Secret History documentary dismiss this theory because of the angle from which Evans fired at Richthofen.

Other sources have suggested that Gunner Robert Buie (also of the 53rd Battery) may have fired the fatal shot, but little evidence supports this theory. In 2007, Hornsby Shire Council, a municipal authority in Sydney, Australia, recognised Buie as the man who shot down Richthofen, placing a plaque near his former home in Brooklyn. Buie died in 1964.

=== Theories about last combat ===
Richthofen was a highly experienced and skilled fighter pilot, fully aware of the risk from ground fire. Further, he concurred with the rules of air fighting created by his late mentor, Boelcke, who specifically advised pilots not to take unnecessary risks. In this context, Richthofen's judgment during his last combat was clearly unsound in several respects. Several theories have been proposed to account for his behaviour.

In 1999, a German medical researcher, Henning Allmers, published an article in the British medical journal The Lancet, suggesting it was likely that brain damage from the head wound Richthofen suffered in July 1917 played a part in his death. This was supported by a 2004 paper by researchers at the University of Texas. Richthofen's behaviour after his injury was noted as consistent with brain-injured patients, and such an injury could account for his perceived lack of judgment on his final flight - flying too low over enemy territory and suffering target fixation.

Richthofen may have been suffering from cumulative combat stress, which made him fail to observe some of his usual precautions. One of the leading British air aces, Major Edward "Mick" Mannock, was killed by ground fire on 26 July 1918 while crossing the lines at low level, an action against which he had always cautioned his younger pilots. One of the most popular of the French air aces, Georges Guynemer, went missing on 11 September 1917, probably while attacking a two-seater without realizing several Fokkers were escorting it.

One suggestion is that on the day of Richthofen's death, the prevailing wind was about 40 km/h (25 mph) easterly, rather than the usual 40 km/h (25 mph) westerly. This meant that Richthofen, heading generally westward at an airspeed of about 160 km/h (99 mph), was travelling over the ground at up to 200 km/h (120 mph) rather than the more typical ground speed of 120 km/h (75 mph). This was considerably faster than normal, and he could easily have strayed over enemy lines without realizing it.

At the time of Richthofen's death, the front was in a highly fluid state, following the initial success of the German offensive of March–April 1918. This was part of Germany's last opportunity to win the war. In the face of Entente air superiority, the German air service was having difficulty acquiring vital reconnaissance information and could do little to prevent Entente squadrons from completing effective reconnaissance and close support of their armies.

=== Burial ===
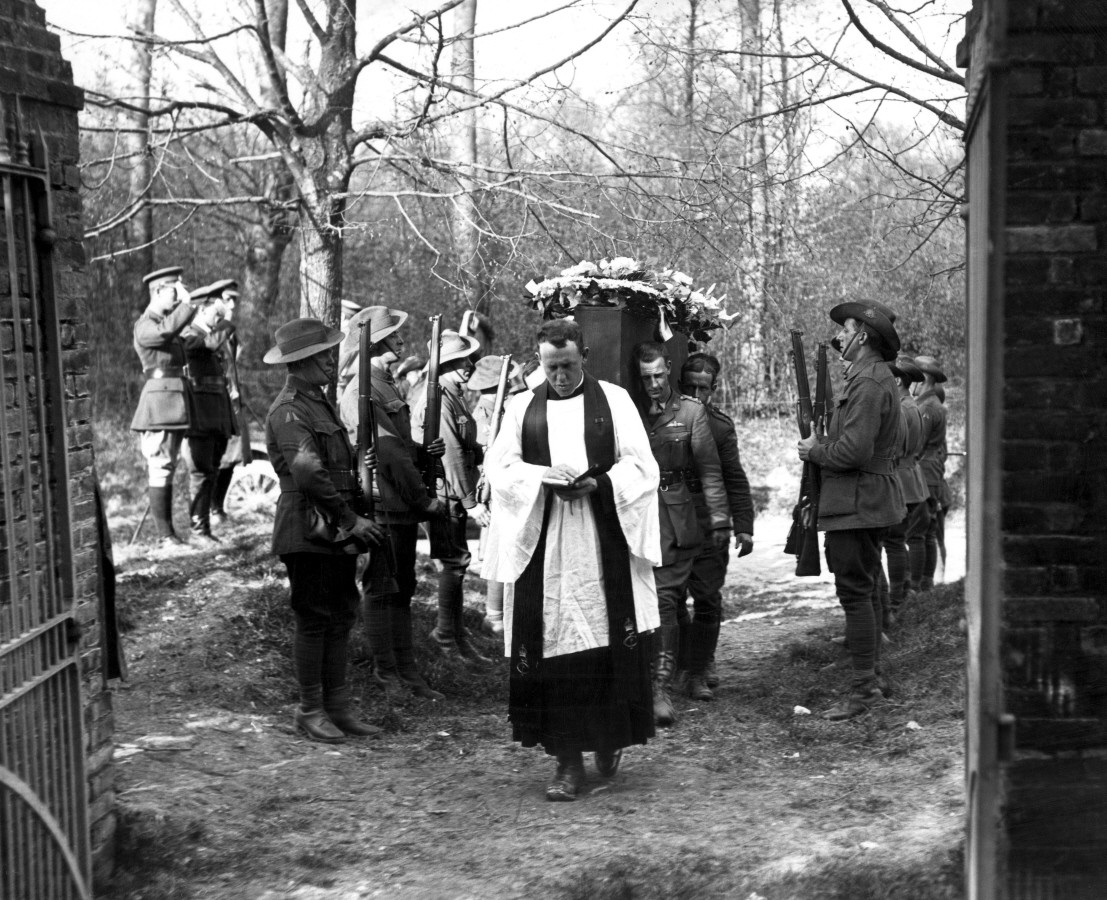
No. 3 Squadron AFC officers were pallbearers and other ranks from the squadron acted as a guard of honour during the Red Baron's funeral on 22 April 1918.

In common with most Entente air officers, No. 3 Squadron AFC's commanding officer Major David Blake, who was responsible for Richthofen's body, regarded the Red Baron with great respect, and he organised a full military funeral.

The body was buried in the cemetery at the village of Bertangles, near Amiens, on 22 April 1918. Six of No. 3 Squadron's officers served as pallbearers, and a guard of honour from the squadron's other ranks fired a salute. (Note: The official caption of the photograph on the right reads, "The funeral of Rittmeister Baron M. Von Richthofen. Firing party presenting arms as the coffin passes into the cemetery, borne on the shoulders of six pilots of No. 3 Squadron A.F.C. Bertangles, France 22nd April 1918. The Padre is Captain Reverend George H. Marshall, M.A., D.S.O.") Entente squadrons stationed nearby presented memorial wreaths, one of which was inscribed with the words, "To Our Gallant and Worthy Foe".

The funeral of Manfred von Richthofen

In the early 1920s, the French authorities created a military cemetery at Fricourt, in which a large number of German war dead, including Richthofen, were reinterred. (Note: Among other reasons to protect the graves from vandalism by disgruntled villagers, understandably resentful of former enemies being buried among their own relatives.) In 1925, von Richthofen's youngest brother, Bolko, recovered the body from Fricourt and took it to Germany. The family's intention was for it to be buried in the Schweidnitz cemetery next to the graves of his father and his brother Lothar von Richthofen, who had been killed in a postwar air crash in 1922. The German Government requested that the body should instead be interred at the Invalidenfriedhof Cemetery in Berlin, where many German military heroes and past leaders were buried, and the family agreed. Richthofen's body received a state funeral. Later, the Third Reich held a further grandiose memorial ceremony at the site of the grave, erecting a massive new tombstone engraved with the single word: Richthofen. During the Cold War, the Invalidenfriedhof was on the boundary of the Soviet zone in Berlin, and the tombstone became damaged by bullets fired at attempted escapees from East Germany. In 1975, the body was moved to a Richthofen family grave plot at the Südfriedhof in Wiesbaden.

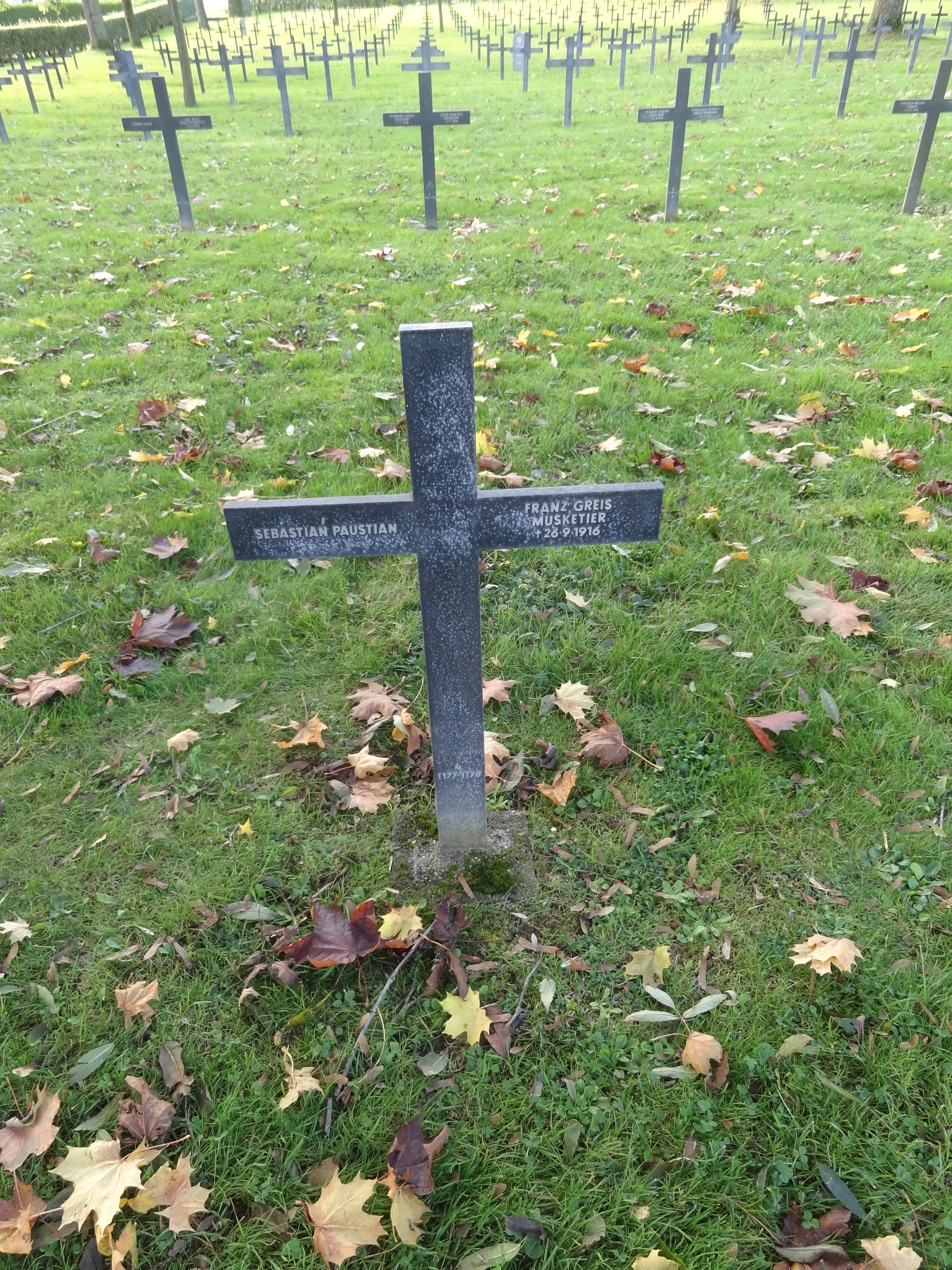
Richthofen's former grave at Fricourt, later Sebastian Paustian, section 4, row 7, grave 1177

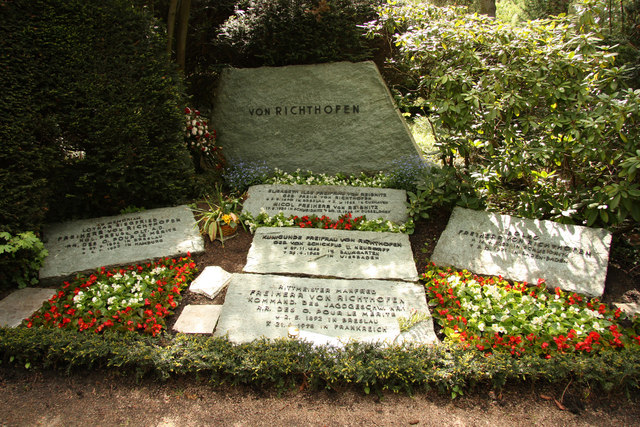
Richthofen family grave at the Südfriedhof in Wiesbaden

== Number of victories ==
For decades after World War I, some authors questioned whether Richthofen had achieved 80 victories, insisting that his record was exaggerated for propaganda purposes. Some claimed that he took credit for aircraft downed by his squadron or wing.

In fact, Richthofen's victories are unusually well documented. A full list of the aircraft the Red Baron was credited with shooting down was published as early as 1958—with documented RFC/RAF squadron details, aircraft serial numbers, and the identities of Entente airmen killed or captured—73 of the 80 listed match recorded British losses. A study conducted by British historian Norman Franks with two colleagues, published in Under the Guns of the Red Baron in 1998, reached the same conclusion about the high degree of accuracy of Richthofen's claimed victories. There were also unconfirmed victories that would put his actual total as high as 100 or more.

For comparison, the highest-scoring Entente ace, the Frenchman René Fonck, achieved 75 confirmed victories and a further 52 unconfirmed behind enemy lines. The highest-scoring British Empire fighter pilots were Canadian Billy Bishop, who was officially credited with 72 victories, British Mick Mannock, with 61 confirmed victories, Canadian Raymond Collishaw, with 60, and British James McCudden, with 57 confirmed victories.

Richthofen's early victories and the establishment of his reputation coincided with a period of German air superiority, but he achieved many of his successes later on against a numerically superior enemy, who flew fighter aircraft that were, on the whole, better than his own.

== In Popular culture ==
Richthofen is the nemesis of the Peanuts comic strip character, Snoopy, who imagines himself dueling with the Red Baron from atop his dog house, which he imagines is a Sopwith Camel. This depiction in both the comic strip and on television resulted in the 1966 release of a novelty song entitled "Snoopy vs. the Red Baron" by The Royal Guardsmen.

== Promotions ==
- 27 April 1911 Fahnenjunker (Officer Candidate)
- 1911 Fahnenjunker-Unteroffizier (Officer Candidate with Corporal/NCO/Junior Sergeant rank)
- 19 December 1911 Fähnrich (Officer Cadet)
- 19 November 1912 Leutnant (2nd Lieutenant)
- 22 March 1917 Oberleutnant (1st Lieutenant)
- 7 April 1917 Rittmeister

== Orders and decorations, tributes, and relics ==
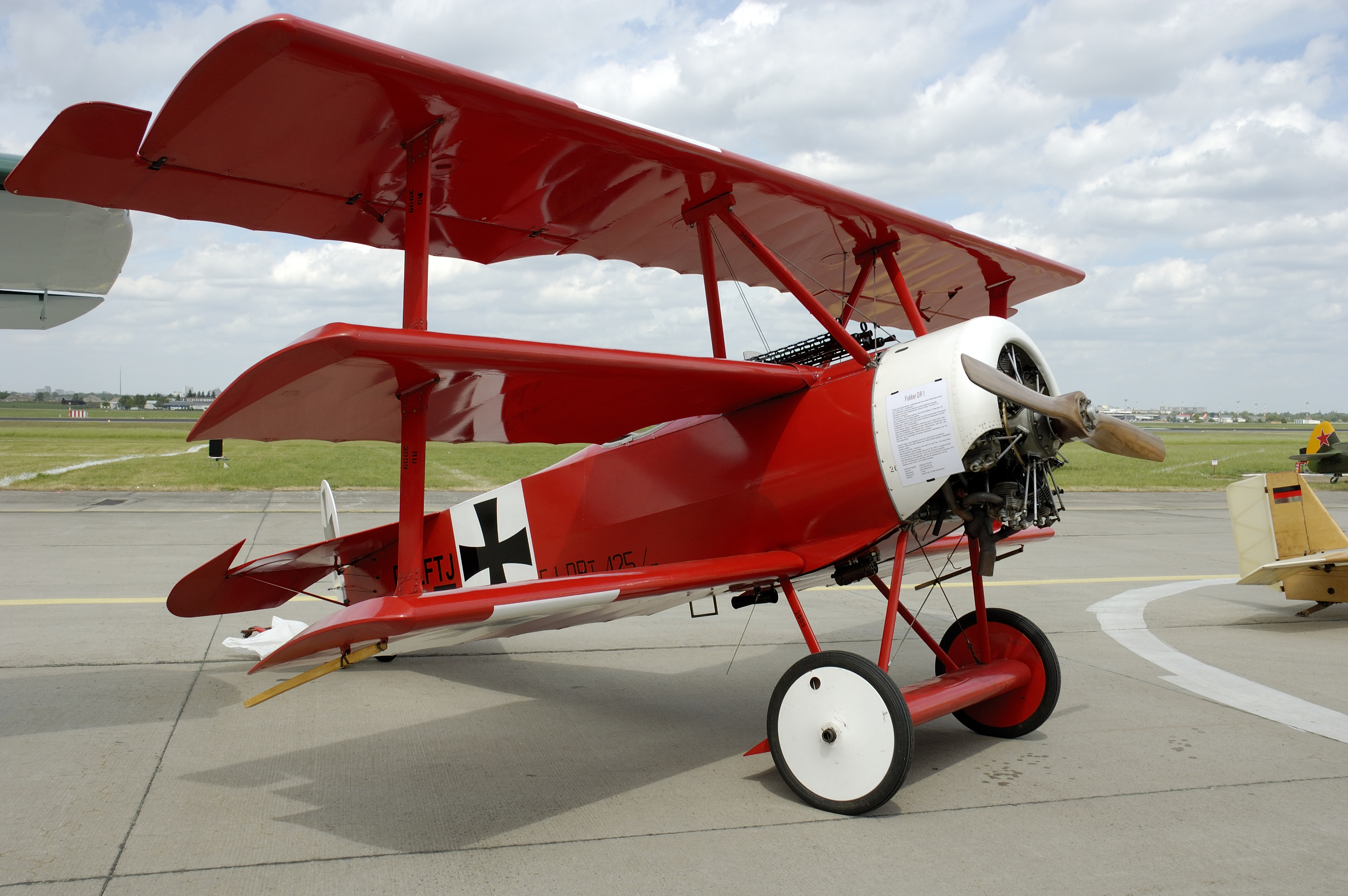
Replica of Richthofen's Fokker Dr.I triplane, at the Berlin Air Show in 2006

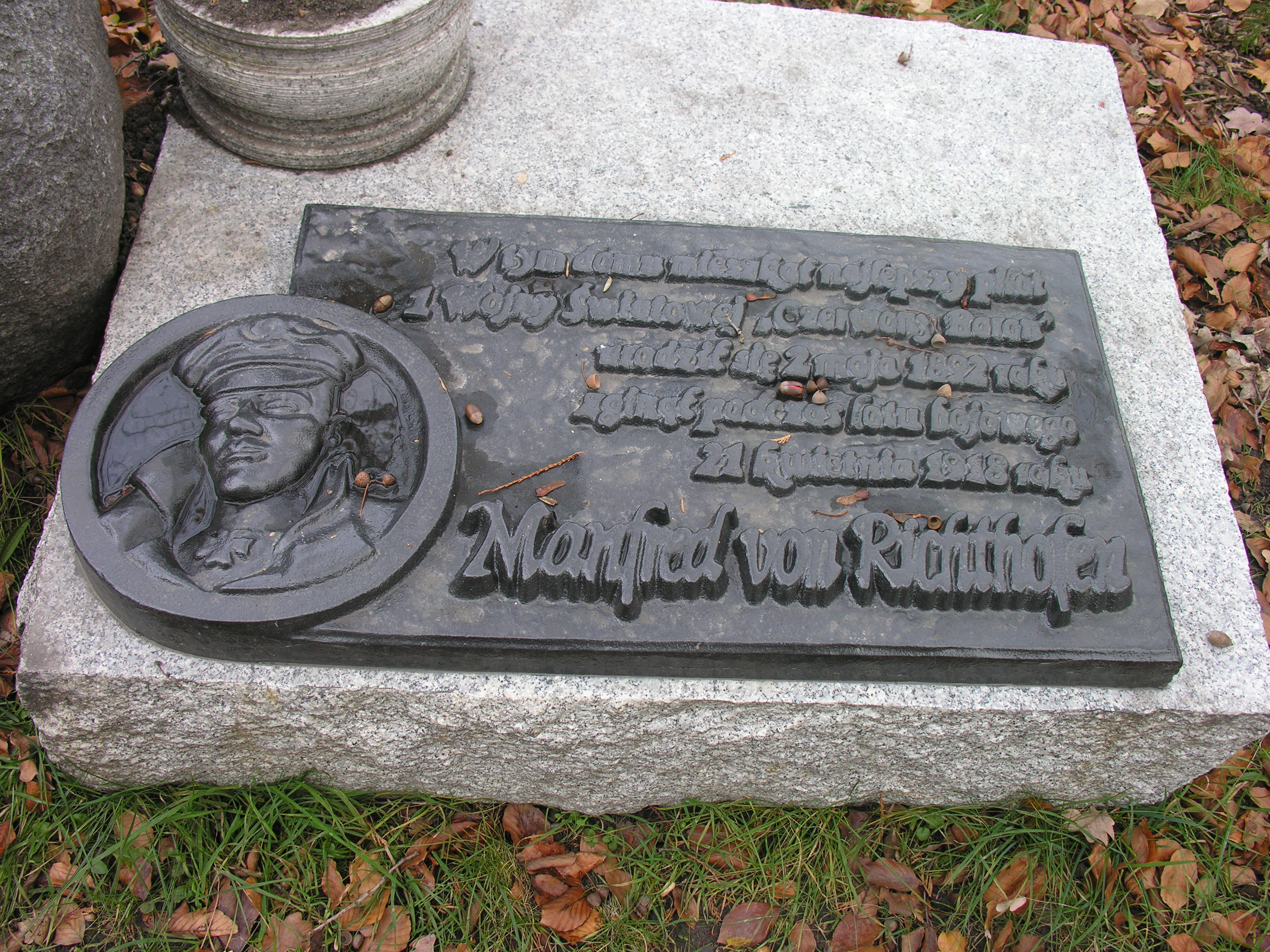
Memorial in Polish at Richthofen's former home in Świdnica (formerly Schweidnitz)

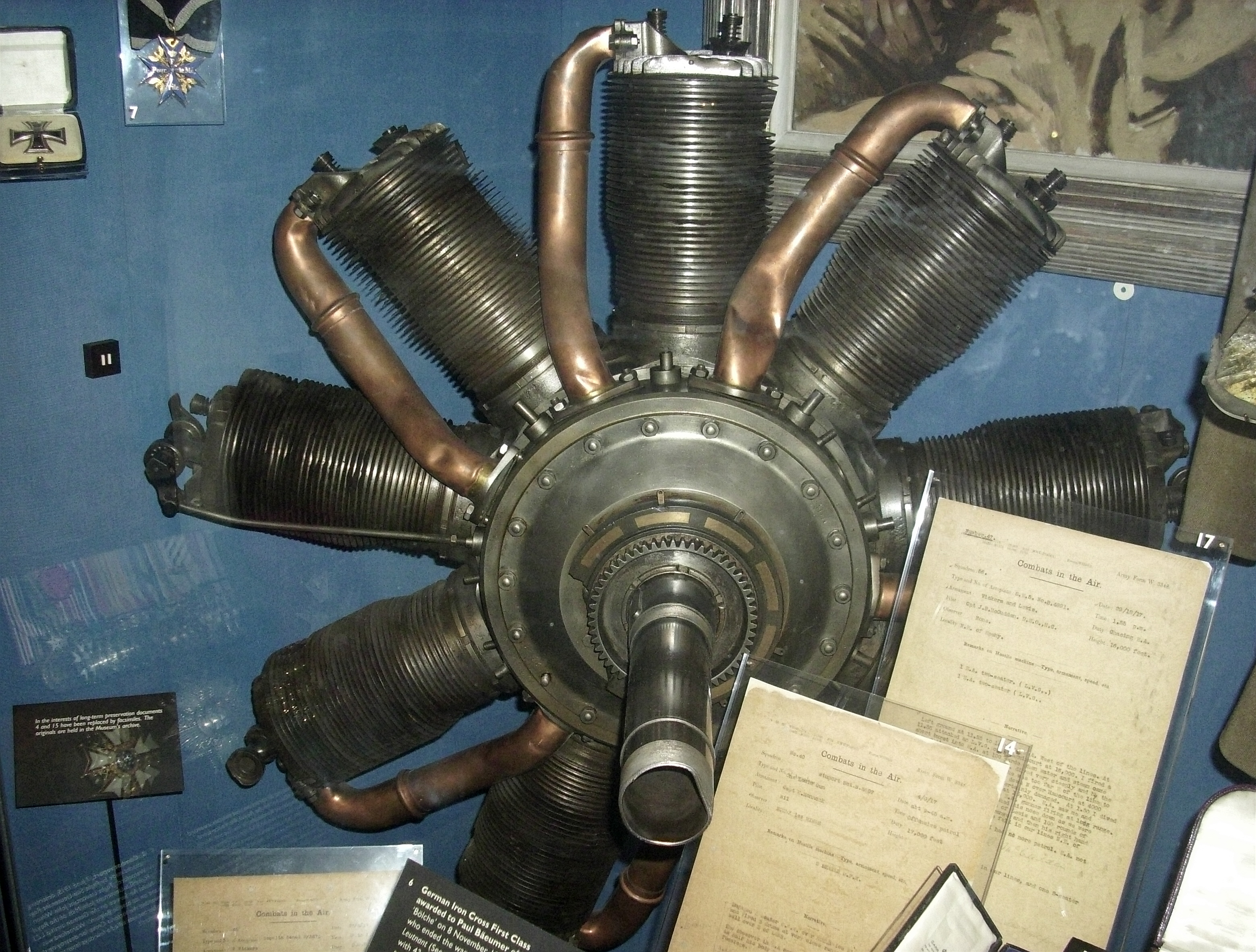
Engine of Richthofen's Fokker DR.I

=== Orders and decorations ===
In order of date awarded

==== German Empire / German Federal States ====
- Prussian Military Pilot Badge
- Honour Goblet for the Winner in Air Combat
- Iron Cross, 1st Class (10 April 1916), 2nd Class (23 September 1914)
- Duke Carl Eduard Medal with Sword Clasp (9 November 1916)
- Knight's Cross of the Royal House Order of Hohenzollern with Swords (11 November 1916)
- Pour le Mérite (12 January 1917)
- Knight's Cross of the Military Order of St. Henry (16 April 1917)
- Order of the Red Eagle, 3rd Class with Crown and Swords (2 April 1918)
- Knight's Cross of the Saxe-Ernestine House Order, 1st Class with Crown and Swords
- Military Merit Order (Bavaria) 4th Class with Swords
- Knight's Cross of the Württemberg Military Merit Order
- Hessian Bravery Medal
- Cross for Faithful Service
- Lippe War Merit Cross, 2nd Class
- Cross of War of Honour for a Heroic Deed
- Brunswick War Merit Cross, 2nd Class
- Wound Badge, 3rd Class (1918)
- Hanseatic Crosses of the Three Hanseatic Cities of Bremen, Hamburg, and Lübeck

==== Austro-Hungarian Empire ====
- Order of the Iron Crown, 3rd Class
- Austro-Hungarian Military Merit Cross, 3rd Class with War Decorations
- Field Pilot Badge

==== Ottoman Empire ====
- Iron Crescent
- Silver Imtiyaz Medal
- Silver Liakat Medal

==== Kingdom of Bulgaria ====
- Military Order for Bravery, 4th Class (12 June 1917)

=== Tributes ===
At various times, several different German military aviation Geschwader (literally "squadrons"; equivalent to Commonwealth air force "groups", French escadrons or USAF "wings") have been named after the Baron:

- Jagdgeschwader 132 "Richthofen" (1 April 1936 – 1 November 1938)—Wehrmacht aviation unit
- Jagdgeschwader 131 "Richthofen" (1 November 1938 – 1 May 1939)—Luftwaffe
- Jagdgeschwader 2 "Richthofen" (1 May 1939 – 7 May 1945)—Luftwaffe
- Jagdgeschwader 71 "Richthofen" (from 6 June 1959)—the first jet-fighter unit established by the post-World War II German Bundeswehr ("federal defence force"); its founding commander was the most successful air ace in history, Erich Hartmann.

In 1941 a newly launched Kriegsmarine (German navy) seaplane tender received the name ''Richthofen''.

In 1968, Richthofen was inducted into the International Air & Space Hall of Fame.

"Red Flag", the US Air Force's large scale training exercise held multiple times a year, was an outgrowth of Project Red Baron, which happened in three phases (c. 1966 to c. 1974) during the period of the Vietnam War.

Red Baron Airport Airpark in Oasis, Idaho is named after him.

The Swedish metal band, Sabaton, released a single named after Richthofen called "The Red Baron" on 14 June 2019. The song detailed his exploits, while also utilizing a transposed variation of Bach's Fugue in G minor as an introduction.

The YouTube series, Epic Rap Battles of History, on 12 December 2025, released a video featuring Richthofen as the "Red Baron" going against another famous world war fighter, Simo "White Death" Häyhä.

=== Souvenirs ===
Captain Roy Brown donated the seat of the Fokker triplane in which the German flying ace made his final flight to the Royal Canadian Military Institute (RCMI) in 1920. Apart from the triplane's seat, the RCMI, in Toronto, also holds a side panel signed by the pilots of Brown's squadron. The engine of Richthofen's Dr.I was donated to the Imperial War Museum in London, where it is still on display. The museum also holds the Baron's machine guns. The control column (joystick) of Richthofen's aircraft and his woollen flying boots can be seen at the Australian War Memorial in Canberra. The Australian National Aviation Museum has what is suspected to be the fuel tank of Richthofen's Dr.I, however, there is no conclusive proof.

== Published works ==
- Richthofen, Captain Manfred Freiherr von (July 1918). The Red Battle Flyer. Translated by Barker, T. Ellis. preface and notes by C. G Grey, editor of The Aeroplane. New York: Robert M. McBride & Co – via Project Gutenberg.

== See also ==
- The Red Baron in popular culture
- List of World War I flying aces

Military offices
Preceded by Rudolf Lang	Commanding Officer of Jasta 11 (German Empire); 1917	Succeeded by Karl Allmenröder
New creation	Commanding Officer of Jagdgeschwader I (German Empire); 1917–1918	Succeeded by Wilhelm Reinhard
