= Vaux-sur-Somme =

- Commune
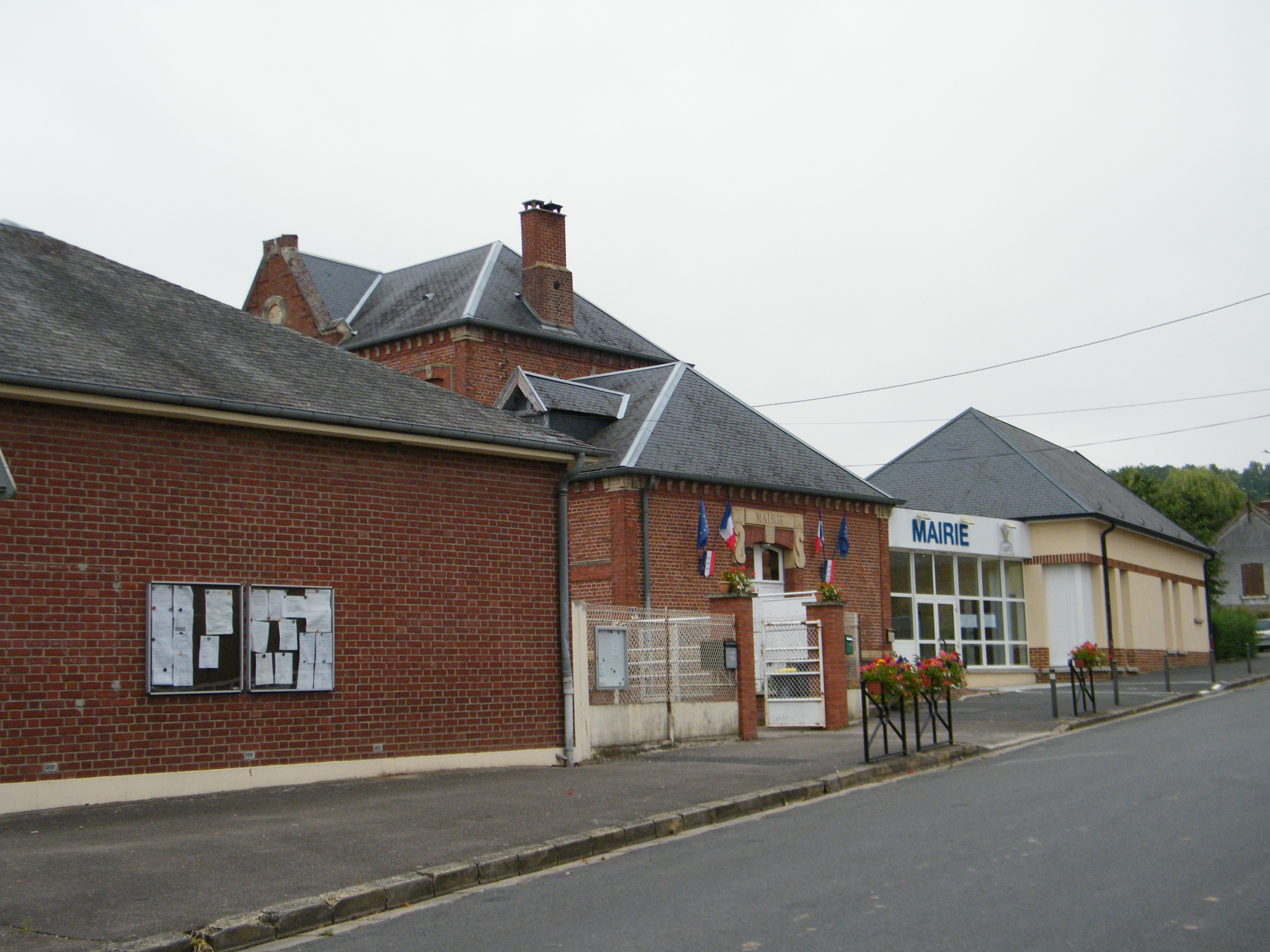
- The town hall in Vaux-sur-Somme
- Location of Vaux-sur-Somme
- Location within France Location within Hauts-de-France
- Coordinates: 49°55′20″N 2°33′04″E
- Country: France
- Region: Hauts-de-France
- Department: Somme
- Arrondissement: Amiens
- Canton: Corbie
- Intercommunality: Val de Somme

Government
  - Mayor (2020–2026): Philippe Gosselin
- Area^{1}: 5.18 km^{2} (2.00 sq mi)
- Elevation: 30 m (98 ft)
- Highest elevation: 111 m (364 ft)
- Lowest elevation: 27 m (89 ft)
- Population (2023): 268
  - Density: 51.7/km^{2} (134/sq mi)
- Time zone: UTC+01:00 (CET)
  - Summer (DST): UTC+02:00 (CEST)
- INSEE/Postal code: 80784 /80800
- ^{1} French Land Register data, which excludes lakes, ponds, glaciers > 1 km^{2} (0.386 sq mi or 247 acres) and river estuaries.

Vaux-sur-Somme (French pronunciation: [vo syʁ sɔm], literally Vaux on Somme; Picard: Veux-su-Sonme) is a commune in the Somme department in Hauts-de-France in northern France.

== History ==
Vaux-sur-Somme is notable as the place where famous flying ace Manfred von Richthofen, better known as the Red Baron, was shot down and killed during World War I on April 21, 1918.

== Demographics ==
Historical population
Year	Pop.	±% p.a.
1968	229	—
1975	208	−1.36%
1982	224	+1.06%
1990	320	+4.56%
1999	339	+0.64%
2007	325	−0.53%
2012	304	−1.33%
2017	308	+0.26%
2023	268	−2.29%
Source: INSEE

== See also ==
- Communes of the Somme department
