= Fokker V.6 =

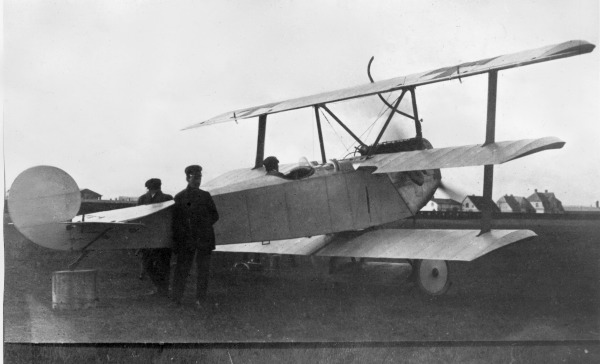

General information
- Type: Fighter
- Manufacturer: Fokker-Flugzeugwerke
- Designer: Reinhold Platz

History
- Manufactured: 1
- First flight: 1917
- Developed from: Fokker V.4

The Fokker V.6 was a prototype triplane fighter designed by the Fokker Aircraft Company (Fokker-Flugzeugwerke) during the First World War for the Imperial German Army's (Deutsches Heer) Imperial German Air Service (Luftstreitkräfte). It was developed in parallel with the V.5, from which the famous Dr.I triplane was developed in 1917. It proved impossible to compensate for the additional weight of the water-cooled engine which significantly reduced its performance in comparison to the V.5. Only one aircraft was built.

== Background and design ==
Following Fokker's usual policy of building both rotary engined and water-cooled engined versions of the same design, the Inspectorate of Flying Troops (Inspektion der Fliegertruppen) placed an order on 7 July 1917 for a version of the V.4 using a 160-horsepower (120 kW) Mercedes D.III engine with the expectation that the extra power of the D.III over the 110 hp (82 kW) Oberursel Ur.III would compensate for the additional weight. To keep the wing loading the same, the wing area had to be increased which added additional weight. The V.6 initially had the fuselage carried over the lower wing by struts, but the struts were removed and the lower wing faired into the fuselage after the initial flight tests in a futile attempt to reduce drag. Development of the V.6 was abandoned later that year because it was inferior in maneuverability and rate of climb to the Dr.I.

== Specifications ==
Data from Fokker Aircraft of WWI: Volume 4: V.1–V.8, F.I & Dr.I: A Centennial Perspective on Great War Airplanes

General characteristics

- Crew: 1
- Length: 5.75 m (18 ft 10 in)
- Upper wingspan: 7.9 m (25 ft 11 in)
- Mid wingspan: 6.6 m (21 ft 8 in)
- Lower wingspan: 6 m (19 ft 8 in)
- Height: 2.725 m (8 ft 11 in)
- Wing area: 22.5 m^{2} (242 sq ft)
- Empty weight: 637 kg (1,404 lb)
- Gross weight: 880 kg (1,940 lb)
- Powerplant: 1 × Mercedes D.III water-cooled straight-six piston engine, 120 kW (160 hp)
- Propellers: 2-bladed

Performance

- Time to altitude: 3 minutes to 1,000 m (3,300 ft)
- 6.5 minutes to 2,000 m (6,600 ft)

Armament
2 × machine guns

== Bibliography ==
- Gray, Peter & Thetford, Owen (1987) [1970]. German Aircraft of the First World War (2nd ed.). London: Putnam. ISBN 0-85177-809-7.
- Green, William & Swanborough, Gordon (2001) [1994]. The Complete Book of Fighters: An Illustrated Encyclopedia of Every Fighter Built and Flown (Revised and Updated ed.). London: Salamander Books. ISBN 1-84065-269-1.
- Herris, Jack & Phillips, Taz (2021). Fokker Aircraft of WWI: Volume 4: V.1–V.8, F.I & Dr.I: A Centennial Perspective on Great War Airplanes. Great War Aviation Centennial Series. Vol. 54. n.p.: Aeronaut Books. ISBN 978-1-953201-08-9.
- Leaman, Paul (2001). Fokker Aircraft of World War One. Marlborough, UK: Crowood Press. ISBN 1-86126-353-8.
