= Fokker V.8 =

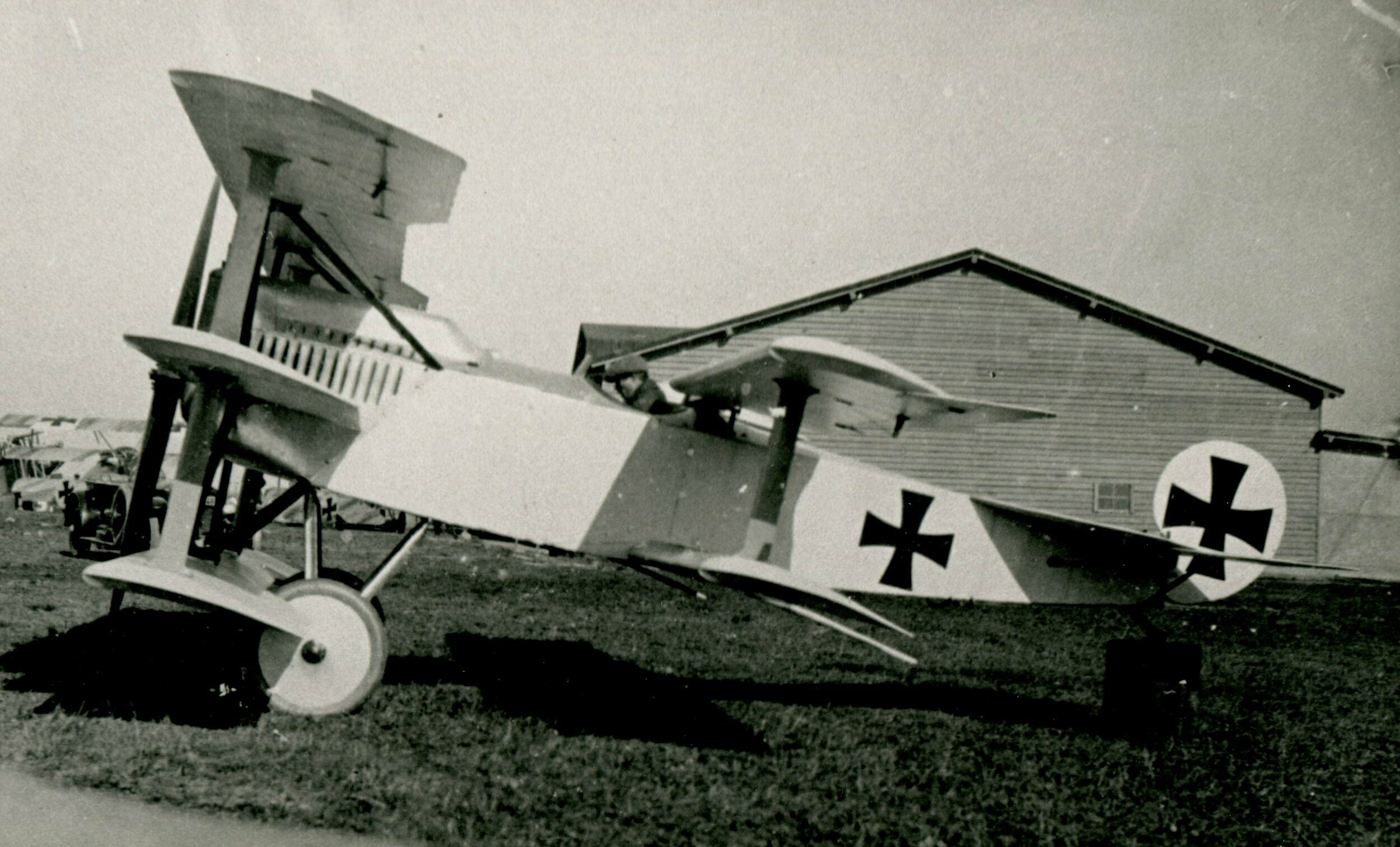

General information
- Type: Fighter
- Manufacturer: Fokker-Flugzeugwerke
- Designer: Reinhold Platz
- Number built: 1

History
- First flight: 1917
- Developed from: Fokker V.6; Fokker Dr.I

Fokker V.8 was a prototype five-winged aircraft built by the Fokker Aircraft Company (Fokker-Flugzeugwerke) during the First World War for the Imperial German Army's (Deutsches Heer) Imperial German Air Service (Luftstreitkräfte). The aircraft was dangerously unstable and performed very poorly. It was scrapped after two flights.

== Development ==
After the initial success of the Fokker Dr.I triplane, Anthony Fokker proposed a quintuplane in late 1917, reasoning that if three wings were good, five would be even better. Reinhold Platz, chief engineer for Fokker, objected, but Fokker ordered the aircraft to be built regardless. The fuselage of the V.6 was lengthened and the three wings from a Dr.I were placed at the extreme front of the aircraft with the 160-horsepower (120 kW) Mercedes D.III engine positioned between the upper and middle wings. An upper pair of Dr.I wings were added midway along the fuselage with their leading edges virtually even with the aft end of the cockpit coaming. Balanced control surfaces were fitted to the upper wings, those at the front acting as conventional ailerons and those in the rear working with the elevators.

Fokker had no formal education in aeronautical engineering and disregarded Platz's concerns about a center of lift that was too far aft. He flew it only twice barely surviving those because of instability and terrible flight characteristics, even after he had some modifications made after his first flight. The V.8 was scrapped shortly afterward.

== Specifications ==
Data from Fokker Aircraft of WWI: Volume 4: V.1–V.8, F.I & Dr.I: A Centennial Perspective on Great War Airplanes

General characteristics

- Crew: 1
- Length: 6.8 m (22 ft 4 in)
- Upper wingspan: 7.7 m (25 ft 3 in)
- Height: 2.8 m (9 ft 2 in)
- Powerplant: 1 × Mercedes D.III water-, 89 kW (120 hp)

Performance Armament
2 × machine guns

== Bibliography ==
- Bowers, Peter M. and McDowell, Ernest R., "Triplanes," Motorbooks Ltd, Osceola WI, 1993, ISBN 0-87938-614-2
- Herris, Jack & Phillips, Taz (2021). Fokker Aircraft of WWI: Volume 4: V.1–V.8, F.I & Dr.I: A Centennial Perspective on Great War Airplanes. Great War Aviation Centennial Series. Vol. 54. n.p.: Aeronaut Books. ISBN 978-1-953201-08-9.
- Weyl, A. R. (1965). Fokker: The Creative Years. London: Putnam. OCLC 2953896.
