= Climb (aeronautics) =

Flight maneuver

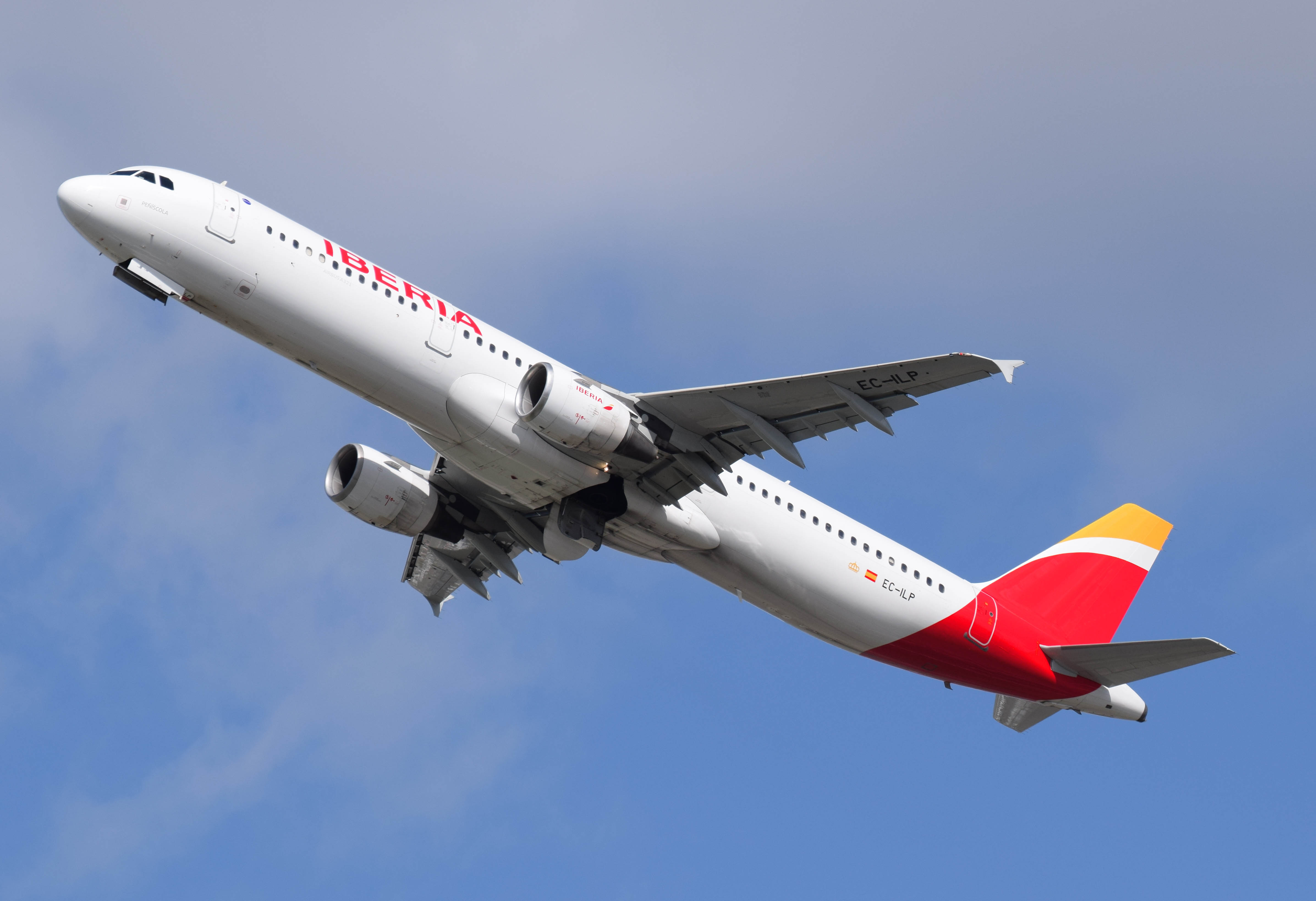
An Iberia Airbus A321 on the climbout from London Heathrow Airport

In aviation, a climb or ascent is the operation of increasing the altitude of an aircraft. It is also the logical phase of a typical flight (the climb phase or climbout) following takeoff and preceding the cruise. During the climb phase there is an increase in altitude to a predetermined level. The opposite of a climb is a descent.

== Climb operation ==
A steady climb is carried out by using excess thrust, the amount by which the thrust from the power plant exceeds the drag on the aircraft. The aircraft will climb steadily until the excess thrust falls to zero. Excess thrust might fall to zero as a result of the pilot's deliberate action in control of the output of the engines, or as the engines respond to reducing air density.

== Climb phase ==
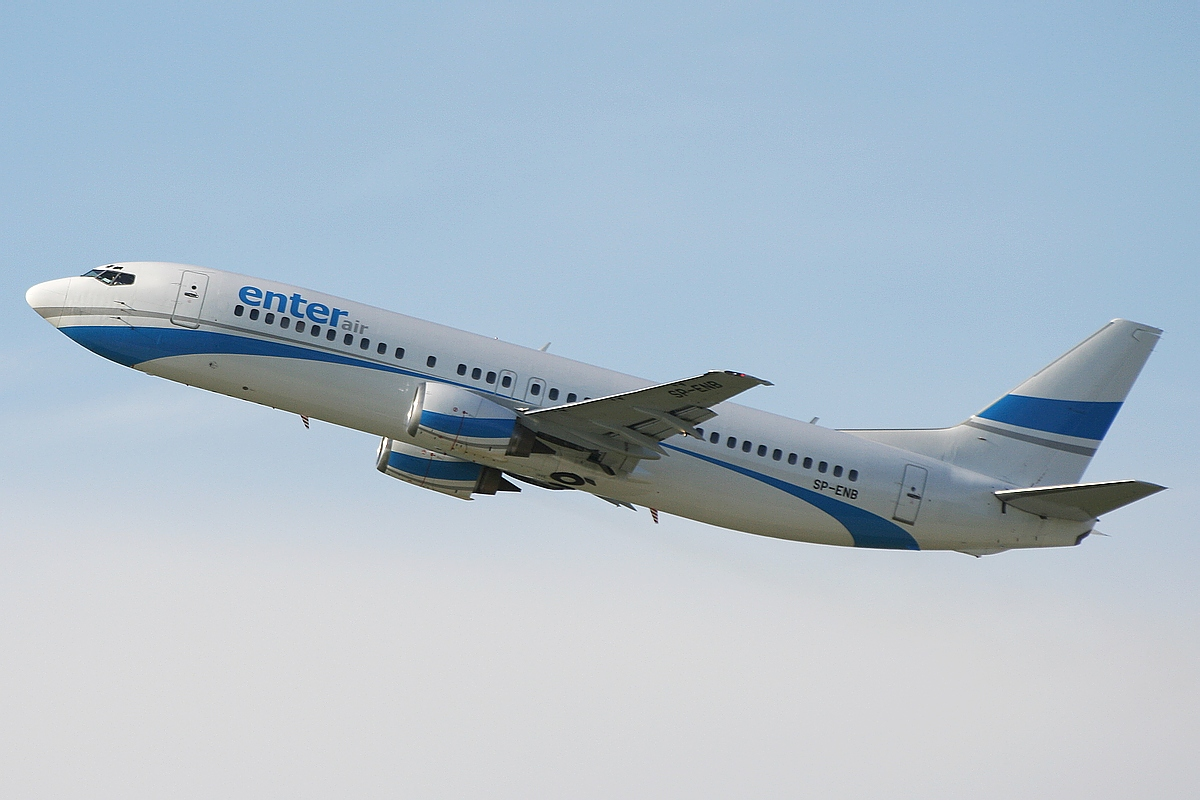
A Boeing 737 climbing

The climb phase, also known as climb-out or initial climb, is the period during which the aircraft climbs to a predetermined cruising altitude after take-off. The climb phase immediately follows take-off and precedes the cruise phase of the flight. Although a single climb phase is typical, multiple climb phases may alternate with cruise phases, particularly for very long flights in which altitude is increased as the weight of fuel aboard decreases (see step climb).

As the climb progresses, the rate of climb decreases as thrust reduces due to reducing air density. A gradual climb improves forward visibility over the nose of the aircraft.

Aircraft also climb when flying in a zone of rising air, but since such zones are unpredictable and inconveniently located, and since most are poorly adapted to passive climbs of this type, only gliders attempt such climbs on a regular basis.

== Normal climb ==
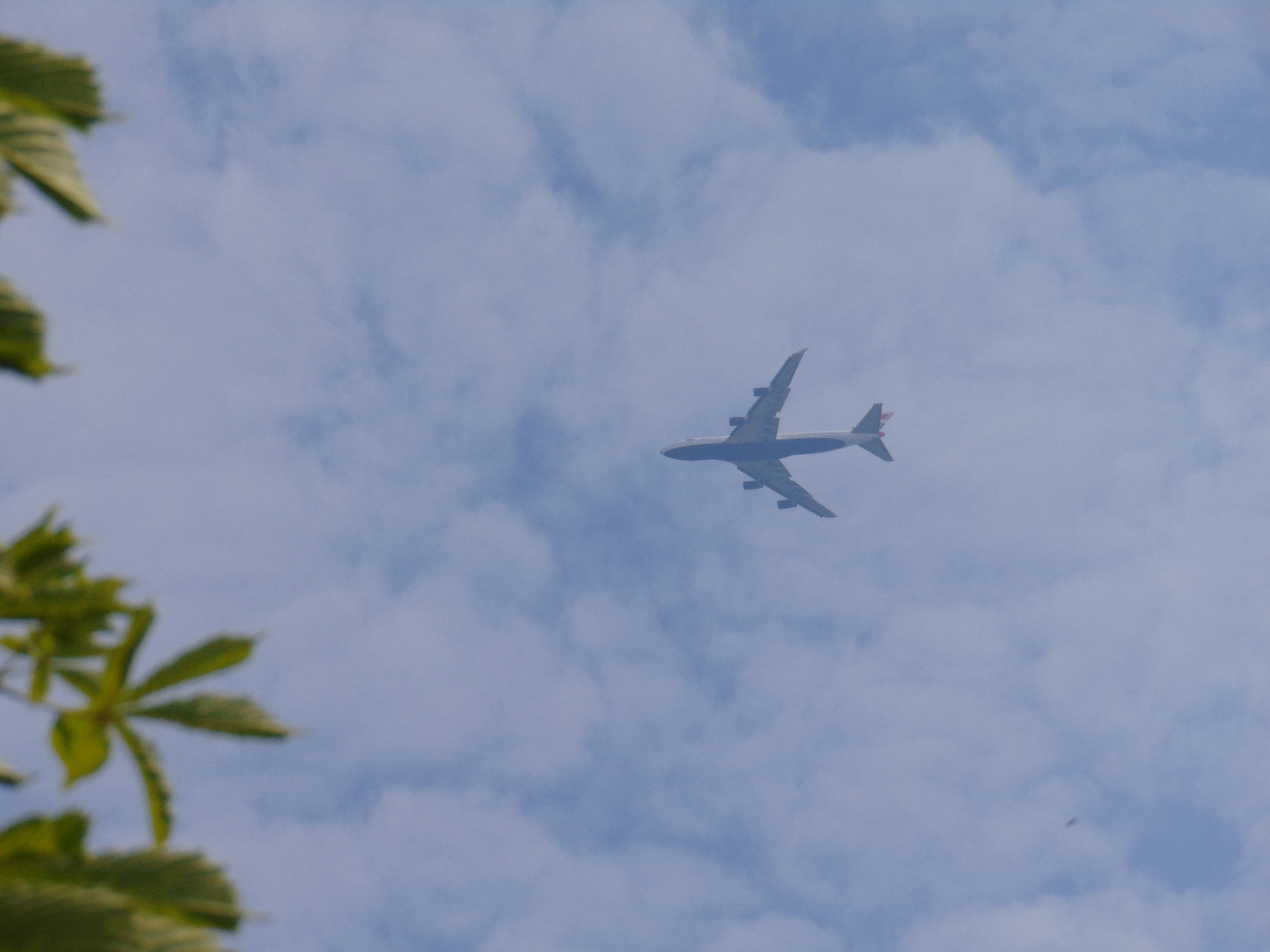
A Boeing 747-400 of British Airways climbing out from London Heathrow, viewed from the River Thames at Bray Lock.

In some jurisdictions and under some conditions, normal climbs are defined by regulations or procedures, and are used to develop airway systems, airspaces, and instrument procedures. Normal climbs are simply standardized climb rates achievable by most aircraft under most conditions that are used as conservative guidelines when developing procedures or structures that are partially a function of such rates. For example, a normal climb of 20 meters per km (120 feet per nautical mile) might be assumed during the development of a navigational procedure or while defining airspace limits in airport terminal areas.

== See also ==
- Rate of climb
- Angle of climb
