= Fokker F.I =

1917 prototype fighter airplane

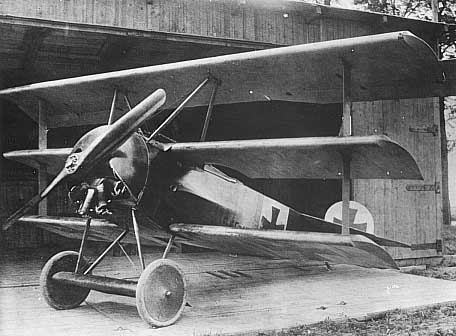

General information
- Type: Fighter aircraft prototype
- Manufacturer: Fokker-Flugzeugwerke
- Primary user: Luftstreitkräfte
- Number built: 3

History
- First flight: 1917
- Developed from: Fokker V.4
- Variant: Fokker Dr.I

The Fokker F.I (company designation V.5) was a prototype fighter triplane by the Fokker-Flugzeugwerke (Fokker Aircraft Company) during the First World War for the Imperial German Army's (Deutsches Heer) Imperial German Air Service (Luftstreitkäfte). An improved version of the V.4 prototype, three aircraft were built in 1917. One was destroyed during static load testing and two were shot down by Allied aircraft after their pilots scored many victories when they were sent to the Western Front for combat testing.

== Background and development ==
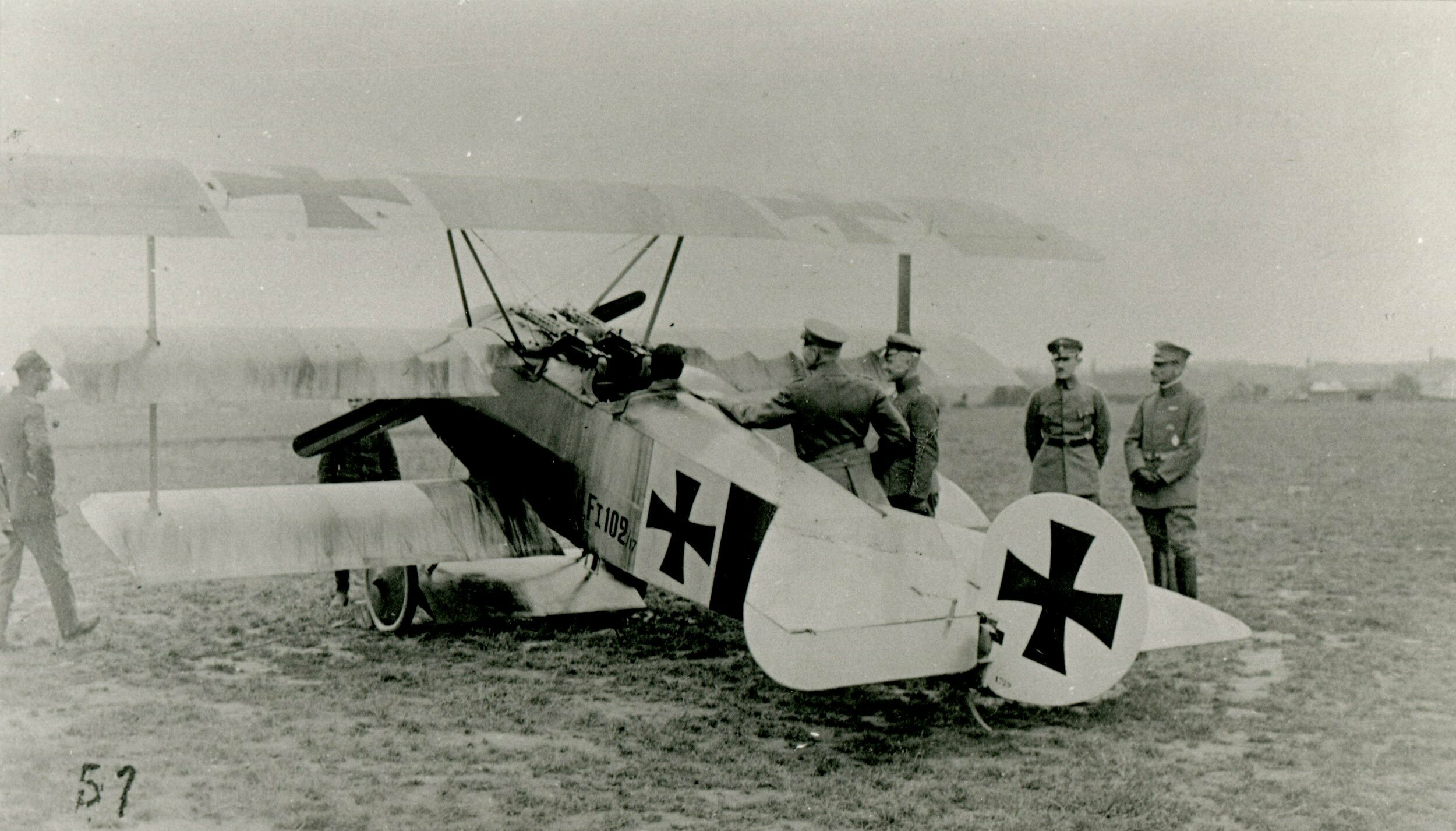
Anthony Fokker demonstrates the F.I prototype himself

After Anthony Fokker returned from a lengthy visit to the front lines on 13 June 1917 where he spoke to German fighter pilots, including Manfred von Richthofen, who had been greatly impressed by the Sopwith Triplane's maneuverability and high rate of climb, he ordered Reinhold Platz to change the V.4 to a triplane configuration. He also ordered design work to begin on a new triplane, designated as the V.5, knowing that the Imperial German Air Service would likely respond to its pilots enthusiasm by ordering triplanes of its own. Fokker optimized the aircraft for climbing performance by lengthening the upper and middle wings to decrease wing loading and adding overhung ailerons on the upper wing to improve the aircraft's roll rate. Thin interplane struts were added to eliminate the upper wing vibrations that had plagued the V.4.

The Inspectorate of Flying Troops (Inspektion der Fliegertruppen (Idflieg) placed an order for one prototype on 7 July and then for two pre-production aircraft on 11 July for combat testing. It designated these three V.5s as F.I's, but all subsequent triplanes were designated as Dr.Is. The first batch of 20 Dr.Is followed on 14 July, which included the three prototypes. The first aircraft was destroyed during its static load testing that began on 7 August. Werner Voss, Manfred von Richthofen and Kurt Wolff were among the pilots that flew the two F.Is in combat, the first and last of whom were killed flying them in September.

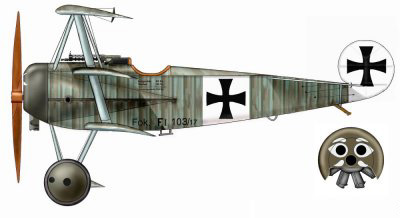
The famous Fokker F.I flown by Voss during his last battle

== Bibliography ==
- Gray, Peter & Thetford, Owen (1987) [1970]. German Aircraft of the First World War (2nd ed.). London: Putnam. ISBN 0-85177-809-7.
- Green, William & Swanborough, Gordon (2001) [1994]. The Complete Book of Fighters: An Illustrated Encyclopedia of Every Fighter Built and Flown (Revised and Updated ed.). London: Salamander Books. ISBN 1-84065-269-1.
- Herris, Jack & Phillips, Taz (2021). Fokker Aircraft of WWI: Volume 4: V.1–V.8, F.I & Dr.I: A Centennial Perspective on Great War Airplanes. Great War Aviation Centennial Series. Vol. 54. n.p.: Aeronaut Books. ISBN 978-1-953201-08-9.
- Leaman, Paul (2001). Fokker Aircraft of World War One. Marlborough, UK: Crowood Press. ISBN 1-86126-353-8.
