= Fokker V.7 =

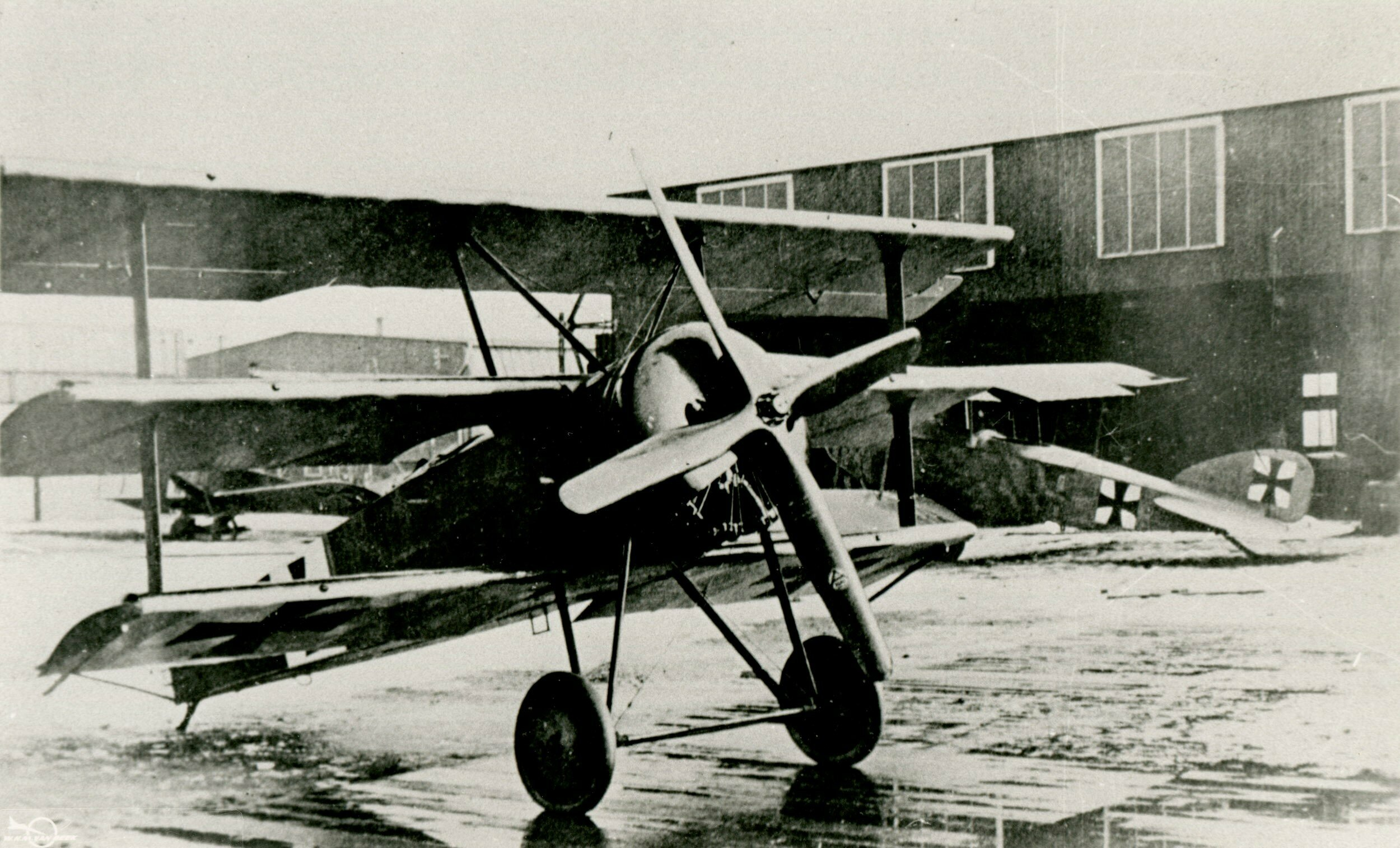
- The V.7S with a four-bladed propeller

General information
- Type: Fighter
- Manufacturer: Fokker-Flugzeugwerke
- Designer: Reinhold Platz
- Number built: 4

History
- Developed from: Fokker Dr.I
- Variants: V.7G, V.7O, V.7G and V.7R

The Fokker V.7 was a prototype fighter triplane designed by the Fokker Aircraft Company (Fokker-Flugzeugwerke) during the First World War for the Imperial German Army's (Deutsches Heer) Imperial German Air Service (Luftstreifkräfte). It was an attempt to improve upon the Dr.I by using larger and more powerful rotary engines than its standard Oberursel Ur.II. Four aircraft were built in 1917, each with a different engine, none of which made it into production.

== Development ==
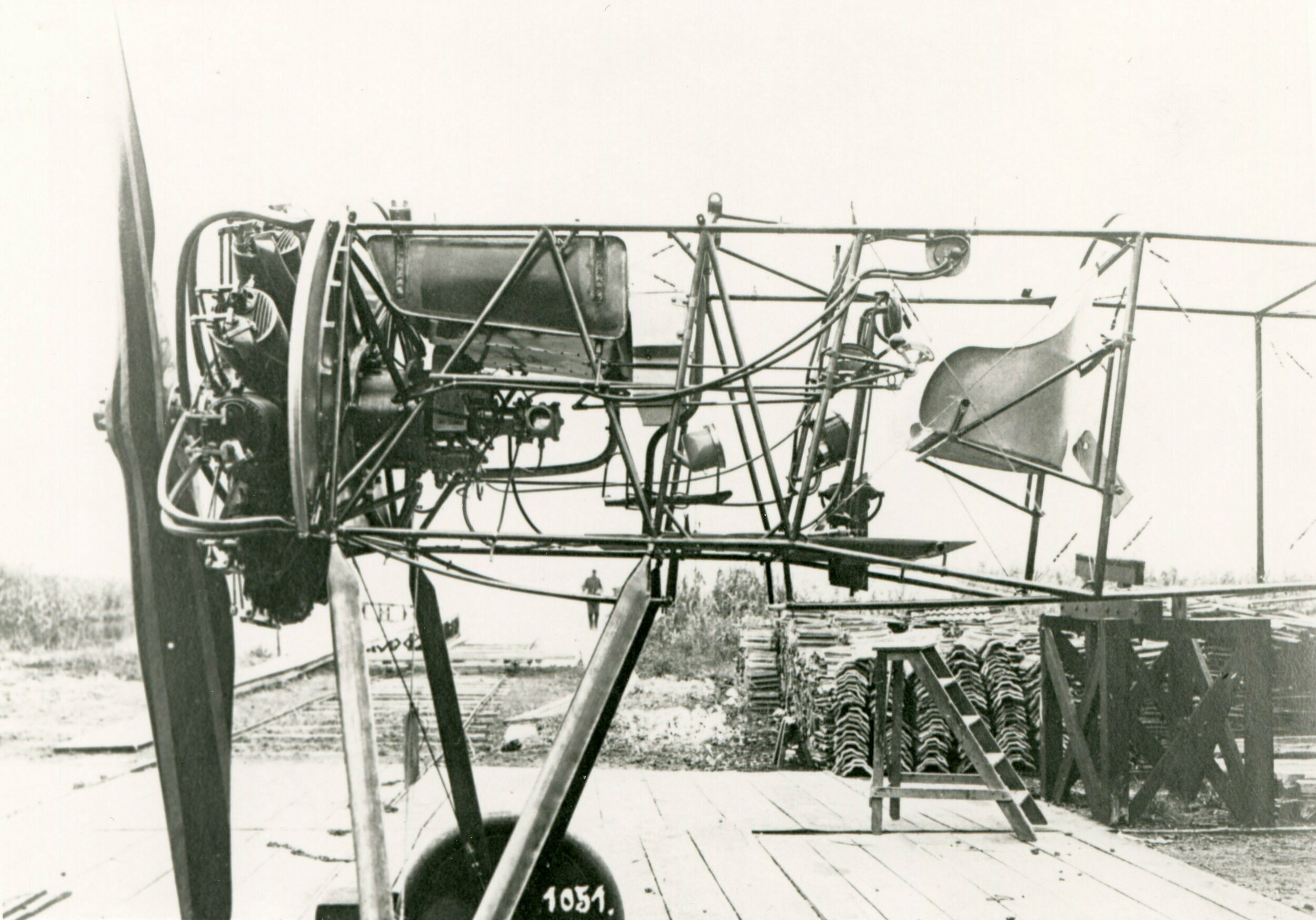
The V.7S airframe with its Sh.III powerplant

The first aircraft was ordered on 13 August 1917; it was equipped with the experimental 11-cylinder 205-horsepower (153 kW) Siemens-Halske Sh.III, double-acting rotary engine and was designated by the factory as the V.7S. (This involved the crankshaft rotating one way, with the crankcase turning the other). To make use of the higher power and rpm, the aircraft tested both two and four-bladed propellers of a larger diameter which required longer landing gear. The rear fuselage also had to be lengthened to compensate for the heavier engine. Flight testing continued into January 1918.

Construction of the V.7O began on 23 August 1917 and it was fitted with a 14-cylinder 160 hp (120 kW) Oberursel U.III. This engine had proved to be little improvement over the existing engines in earlier Fokker designs and the aircraft was converted into a Dr.I that was accepted on 26 April 1918.

The V.7G began construction on 12 October 1917 using the 160 hp Goebel Goe.III. The fuselage had to be lengthened and a bulged cowling to fit over the engine. Performance was excellent, especially at high altitude, the engine was not ready to be placed into production. Fokker records state that this aircraft was converted into a normal Dr.I in 1918, although a new fuselage may have been mated with the V.7G's ordinary Dr.I wings.

The V.7R was supplied without an engine to the Hungarian General Machine Factory (MAG). The company fitted it with a 108 kW (145 hp) Steyr copy of the Le Rhône 9J engine. The aircraft competed in the Austria-Hungarian fighter fly-off in July 1918, but was badly damaged when the rudder cable broke shortly afterward.

== Bibliography ==
- Gray, Peter & Thetford, Owen (1987) [1970]. German Aircraft of the First World War (2nd ed.). London: Putnam. ISBN 0-85177-809-7.
- Green, William & Swanborough, Gordon (2001) [1994]. The Complete Book of Fighters: An Illustrated Encyclopedia of Every Fighter Built and Flown (Revised and Updated ed.). London: Salamander Books. ISBN 1-84065-269-1.
- Grosz, Peter Michael; Haddow, George & Schiemer, Peter (1993). Austro-Hungarian Army Aircraft of World War One. Mountain View, California: Flying Machines Press. ISBN 0-9637110-0-8.
- Herris, Jack & Phillips, Taz (2021). Fokker Aircraft of WWI: Volume 4: V.1–V.8, F.I & Dr.I: A Centennial Perspective on Great War Airplanes. Great War Aviation Centennial Series. Vol. 54. n.p.: Aeronaut Books. ISBN 978-1-953201-08-9.
- Leaman, Paul (2001). Fokker Aircraft of World War One. Marlborough, UK: Crowood Press. ISBN 1-86126-353-8.
