= Angle of climb =

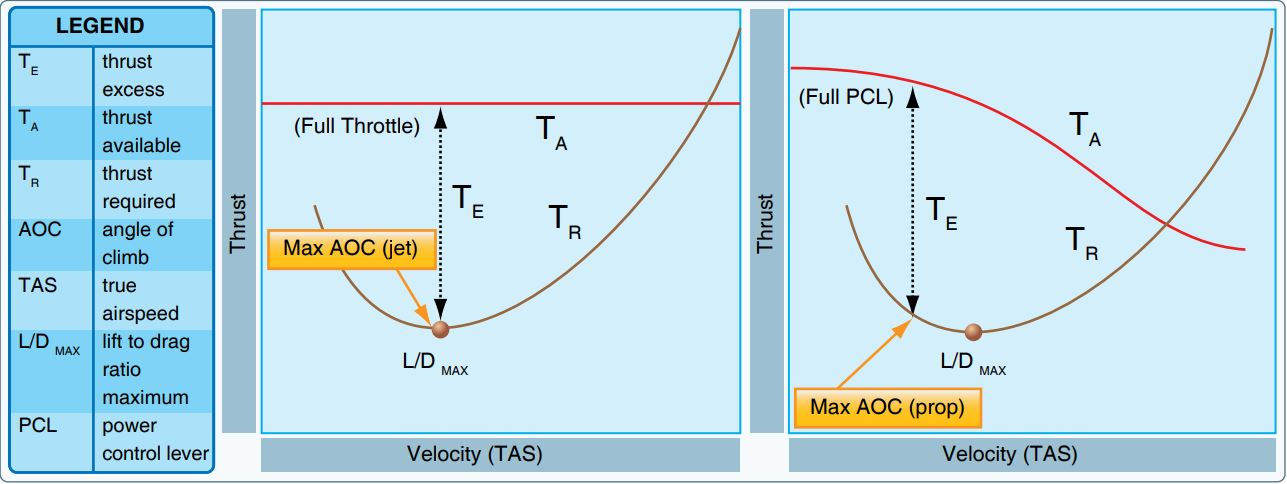
Best Angle of Climb for a jet and a propeller aircraft

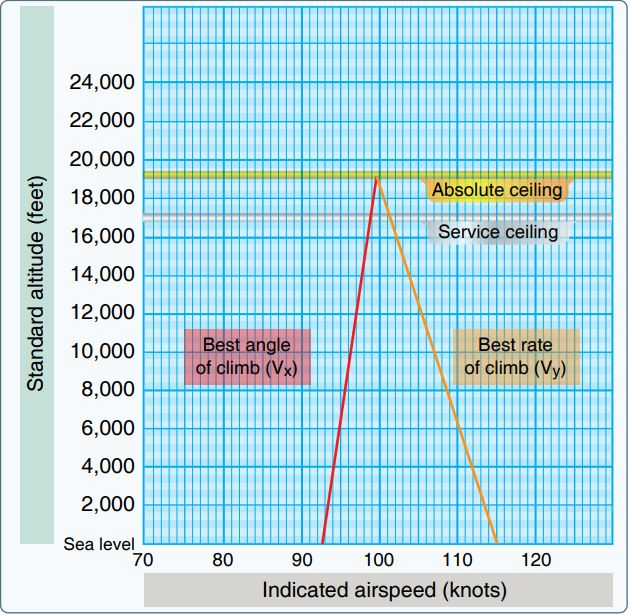
Best Angle of Climb as a function of altitude

In aerodynamics, climb gradient is the ratio between distance travelled over the ground and altitude gained, and is expressed as a percentage. The angle of climb can be defined as the angle between a horizontal plane representing the Earth's surface, and the actual flight path followed by the aircraft during its ascent.

The speed of an aircraft type at which the angle of climb is largest is called V_{X}. It is always slower than V_{Y}, the speed for the best rate of climb. As the latter gives the quickest way for gaining altitude levels, regardless of the distance covered during such a maneuver, it is more relevant to cruising. The maximum angle of climb on the other hand is where the aircraft gains the most altitude in a given distance, regardless of the time needed for the maneuver. This is important for clearing an obstacle, and therefore is the speed a pilot uses when executing a "short field" takeoff. V_{X} increases with altitude, and V_{Y} decreases with altitude until they converge at the airplane's absolute ceiling.

Best angle of climb (BAOC) airspeed for an airplane is the speed at which the maximum excess thrust is available. Excess thrust is the difference between the total drag of the aircraft, and the thrust output of the powerplant. For a jet aircraft, this speed is very close to the speed at which the total minimum drag occurs.

== See also ==
- Rate of climb
