= Fokker V.4 =

V.4
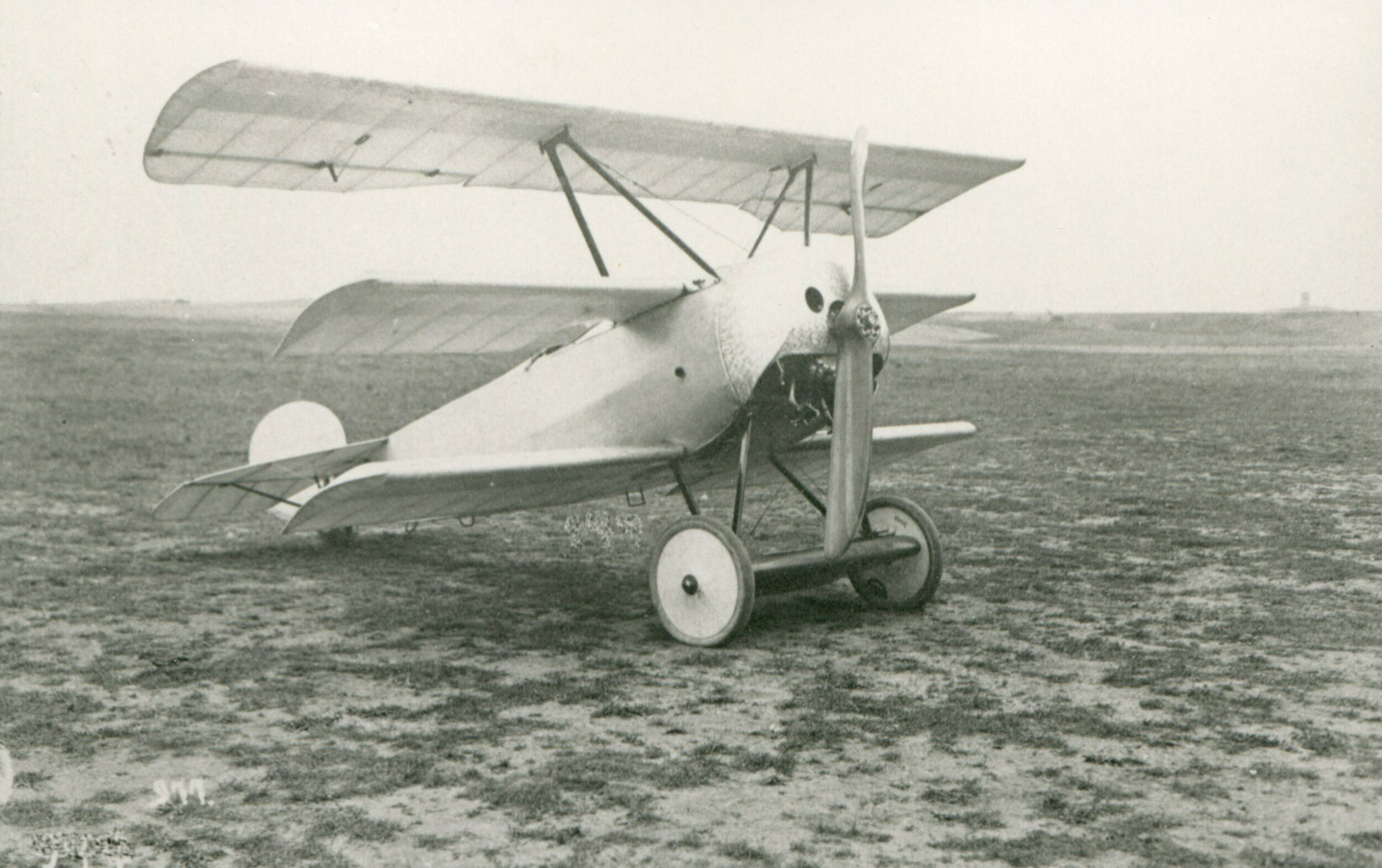
- The original configuration of the V.4 with fully cantilevered wings.

General information
- Type: Fighter aircraft
- Manufacturer: Fokker
- Designer: Reinhold Platz
- Number built: 1

History
- First flight: about 25 June 1917

The Fokker V.4 was a prototype German fighter triplane built for the Austro-Hungarian Imperial and Royal Aviation Troops (Kaiserliche und Königliche Luftfahrtruppen) during World War I. It began development as a biplane, but this was changed to a triplane configuration after Anthony Fokker learned of the positive impression that a British triplane had made on German fighter pilots. It was shipped to Hungary for evaluation in 1917.

== Development ==
Fokker had received an order for a fighter biplane that used a 110-horsepower (82 kW) Oberursel UR.II rotary engine on 13 May 1917. He ordered Reinhold Platz to change the V.4 to a triplane after his return from a lengthy visit to the front lines on 13 June where he spoke to German fighter pilots, including Manfred von Richthofen, who had been greatly impressed by the Sopwith Triplane's maneuverability and high rate of climb, knowing that the Imperial German Air Service would likely respond to its pilots enthusiasm by ordering triplanes of its own. By this time the company had designed a second version of its cantilever wing with a much lighter hollow double box spar and plywood covering only the leading edge of the wings. The fuselage reverted to the slab-sided configuration used in his first fighters which improved lateral stability and the pilot's downward vision. Fokker was forced to use a captured French Le Rhône 9Jb engine because the UR.II was not yet available. The V.4 looked very much like the later Dr.I, but is easily recognized by the lack of interplane struts. The upper wing was the longest and the lower two wings had the same span. The rudder was balanced, but the ailerons and elevators lacked horn balances.

The V.4 made its first flight around 25 June, only 12 days after Fokker had ordered the modification. Flight testing was done without the armament installed and lasted until the aircraft was shipped to Hungary without an engine or machine guns in August. It arrived without a cowling on 3 September, but was extensively tested with license-built Austro-Hungarian rotary engines after it was discovered that Le Rhône engine supplied by the Imperial and Royal Aviation Troops did not fit the V.4's engine mount. Production was recommended using a 150 hp (110 kW) engine built by Steyr on 25 October, but it was not accepted.

== Specifications ==
General characteristics

- Crew: 1
- Length: 5.75 m (18 ft 10 in)
- Wingspan: 6.21 m (20 ft 4 in)
- Height: 2.95 m (9 ft 8 in)
- Wing area: 14 m^{2} (150 sq ft)
- Empty weight: 346 kg (763 lb)
- Gross weight: 528 kg (1,164 lb)
- Powerplant: 1 × Le Rhône 9J rotary engine , 89 kW (120 hp)

Performance

- Maximum speed: 200 km/h (120 mph, 110 kn)
- Time to altitude: 2.5 minutes to 1,000 m (3,300 ft)
- 5.5 minutes to 2,000 m (6,600 ft)

== Bibliography ==
- Gray, Peter & Thetford, Owen (1987) [1970]. German Aircraft of the First World War (2nd ed.). London: Putnam. ISBN 0-85177-809-7.
- Green, William & Swanborough, Gordon (2001) [1994]. The Complete Book of Fighters: An Illustrated Encyclopedia of Every Fighter Built and Flown (Revised and Updated ed.). London: Salamander Books. ISBN 1-84065-269-1.
- Grosz, Peter Michael; Haddow, George & Schiemer, Peter (1993). Austro-Hungarian Army Aircraft of World War One. Mountain View, California: Flying Machines Press. ISBN 0-9637110-0-8.
- Herris, Jack & Phillips, Taz (2021). Fokker Aircraft of WWI: Volume 4: V.1–V.8, F.I & Dr.I: A Centennial Perspective on Great War Airplanes. Great War Aviation Centennial Series. Vol. 54. n.p.: Aeronaut Books. ISBN 978-1-953201-08-9.
- Leaman, Paul (2001). Fokker Aircraft of World War One. Marlborough, UK: Crowood Press. ISBN 1-86126-353-8.
