= Fokker Dr.I =

WWI fighter aircraft

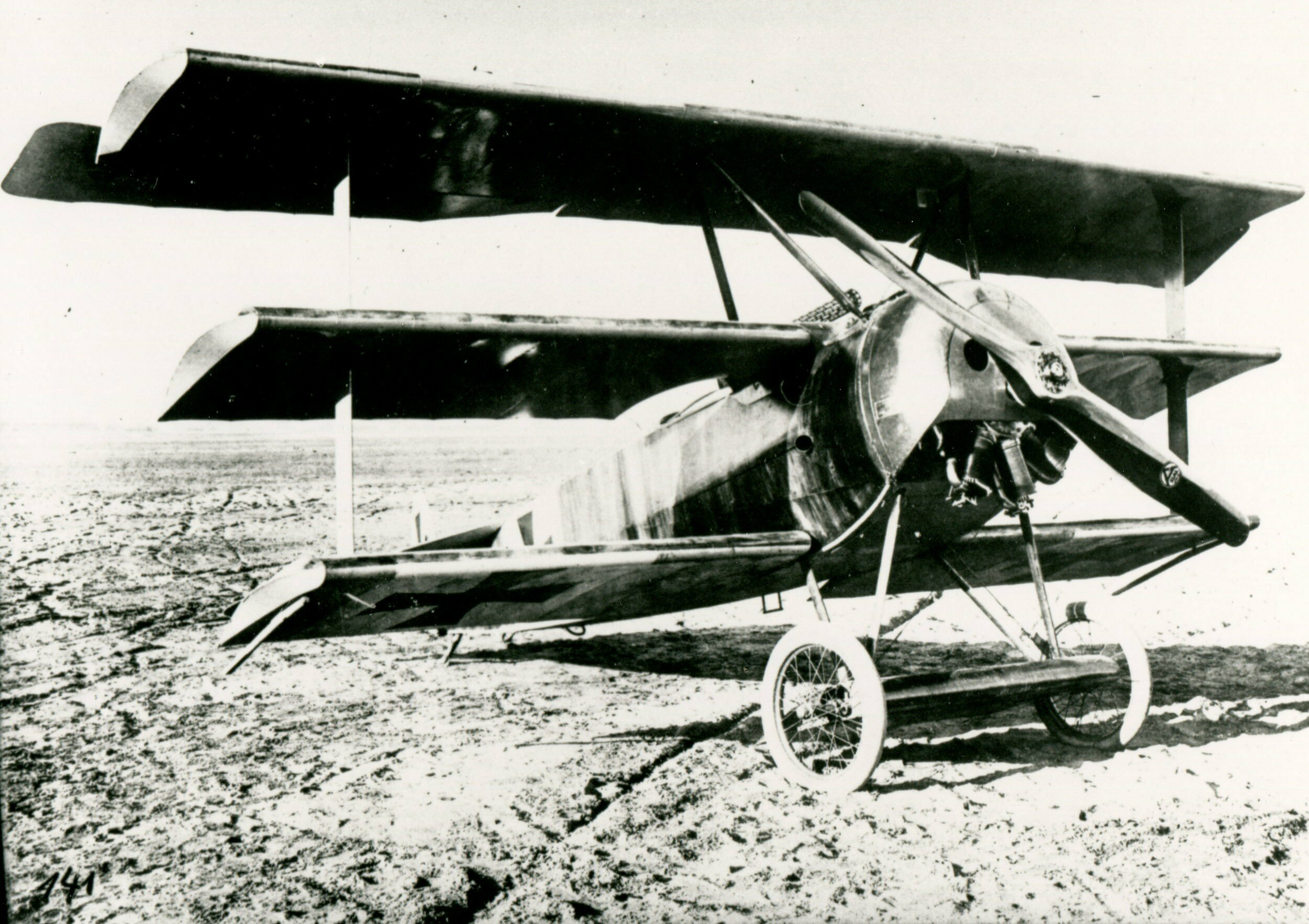
- Fokker Dr.I

General information
- Type: Fighter
- Manufacturer: Fokker-Flugzeugwerke
- Designer: Reinhold Platz
- Primary user: Luftstreitkräfte
- Number built: 320

History
- First flight: July 5, 1917
- Developed from: Fokker V.4; Fokker F.I
- Variant: Fokker V.7

The Fokker Dr.I (Dreidecker, "triplane" in German), often known simply as the Fokker Triplane, was a World War I fighter aircraft built by Fokker-Flugzeugwerke. The Dr.I saw widespread service in the spring of 1918. It became famous as the aircraft in which Manfred von Richthofen gained his last 17 victories (plus two earlier ones in the Fokker F.I prototype in September 1917), and in which he was killed on 21 April 1918. The Fokker Dr.I was flown with great success by many other German aces, most notably Josef Jacobs, with 30 confirmed kills in the type.

== Design and development ==
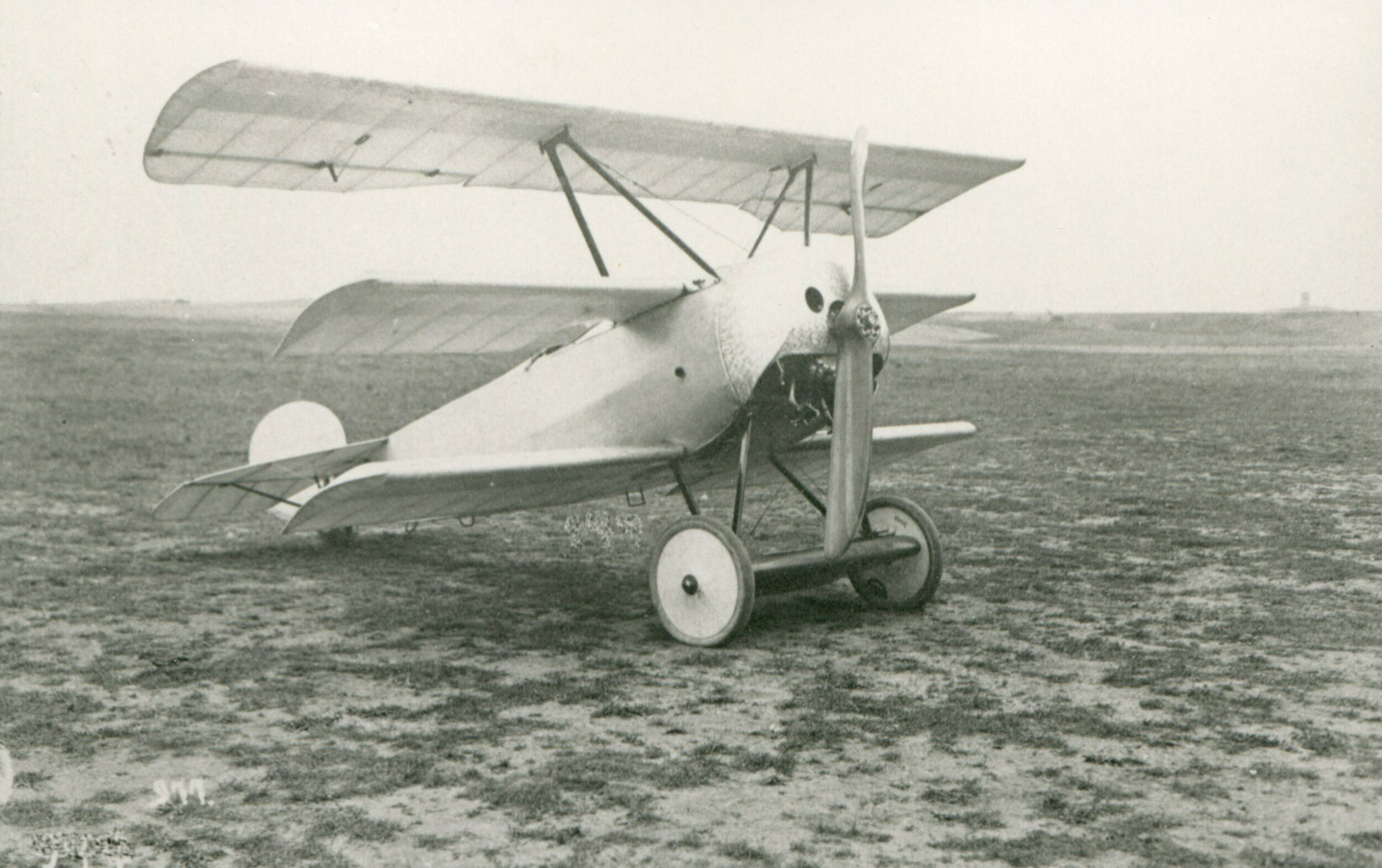
Fokker V.4 prototype

In February 1917, the Sopwith Triplane began to appear over the Western Front. Despite its single Vickers machine gun armament, the Sopwith swiftly proved itself superior to the more heavily armed Albatros fighters then in use by the Luftstreitkräfte. In April 1917, Anthony Fokker viewed a captured Sopwith Triplane while visiting Jasta 11. Upon his return to the Schwerin factory, Fokker instructed Reinhold Platz to build a triplane, but gave him no further information about the Sopwith design. Platz responded with the V.4, a small, rotary-powered triplane with a steel-tube fuselage and thick cantilever wings, first developed during Fokker's government-mandated collaboration with Hugo Junkers. Initial tests revealed that the V.4 had unacceptably high control forces resulting from the use of unbalanced ailerons and elevators.

Instead of submitting the V.4 for a type test, Fokker produced a revised prototype designated V.5. The most notable changes were the introduction of horn-balanced ailerons and elevators, as well as longer-span wings. The V.5 also featured interplane struts, which were not necessary from a structural standpoint, but which minimized wing flexing. On 14 July 1917, the military aviation authority Idflieg issued an order for 20 preproduction aircraft. The V.5 prototype, serial 101/17, was tested to destruction at Adlershof on 11 August 1917.

== Operational history ==
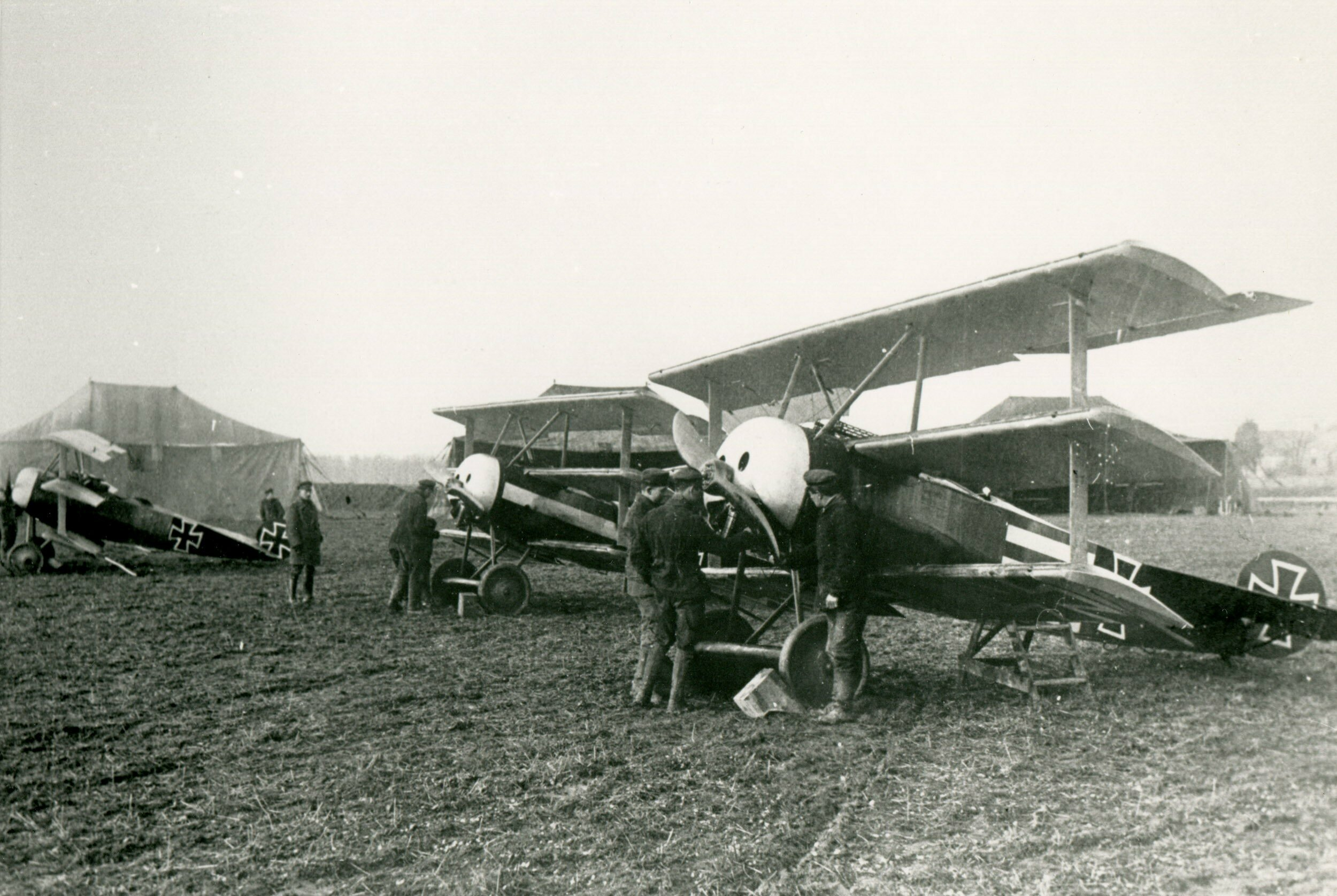
Jasta 12 flightline at Toulis, France

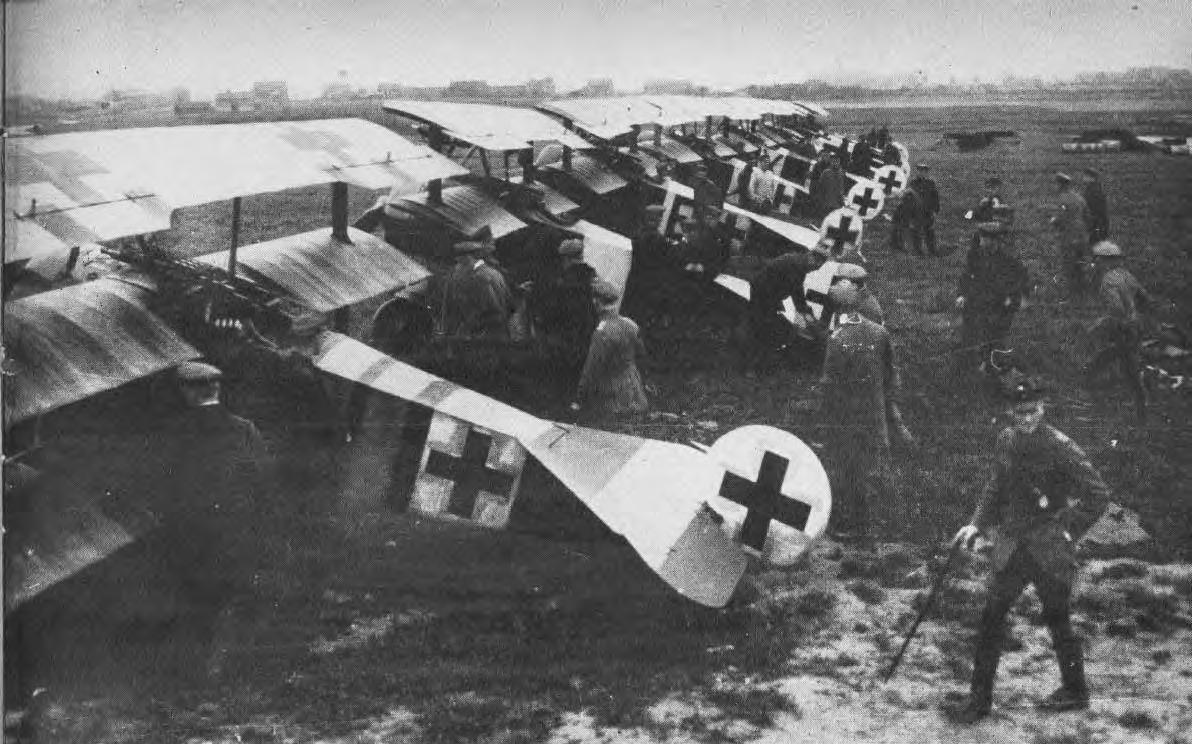
Triplanes of Jasta 26 at Erchin, France

The first two preproduction triplanes were designated F.I, in accord with Idflieg's early class prefix for triplanes. These aircraft, serials 102/17 and 103/17, were the only machines to receive the F.I designation and could be distinguished from subsequent aircraft by a slight convex curve on the leading edge of the horizontal tail surfaces. The two aircraft were sent to Jastas 10 and 11 for combat evaluation, arriving at Markebeeke, Belgium on 28 August 1917.

Richthofen first flew 102/17 on 1 September 1917 and shot down two enemy aircraft in the next two days. He reported to the Kogenluft (Kommandierender General der Luftstreitkräfte) that the F.I was superior to the Sopwith Triplane. Richthofen recommended that fighter squadrons be reequipped with the new aircraft as soon as possible. The combat evaluation came to an abrupt conclusion when Oberleutnant Kurt Wolff, Staffelführer of Jasta 11, was shot down in 102/17 on 15 September, and Leutnant Werner Voss, Staffelführer of Jasta 10, was killed in 103/17 on 23 September.

The remaining pre-production aircraft, designated Dr.I, were delivered to Jasta 11. Idflieg issued a production order for 100 triplanes in September, followed by an order for 200 in November. Apart from the straight leading edge of the tailplane, these aircraft were almost identical to the F.I. The primary distinguishing feature was the addition of wingtip skids, which proved necessary because the aircraft was tricky to land and prone to ground looping. In October, Fokker began delivering the Dr.I to squadrons within Richthofen's Jagdgeschwader I.

Compared with the Albatros and Pfalz fighters, the Dr.I offered exceptional manoeuverability Though the ailerons were not very effective, the rudder and elevator controls were light and powerful. Rapid turns, especially to the right, were facilitated by the triplane's marked directional instability. Vizefeldwebel Franz Hemer of Jasta 6 said, "The triplane was my favorite fighting machine because it had such wonderful flying qualities. I could let myself stunt – looping and rolling – and could avoid an enemy by diving with perfect safety. The triplane had to be given up because although it was very manoeuverable, it was no longer fast enough."

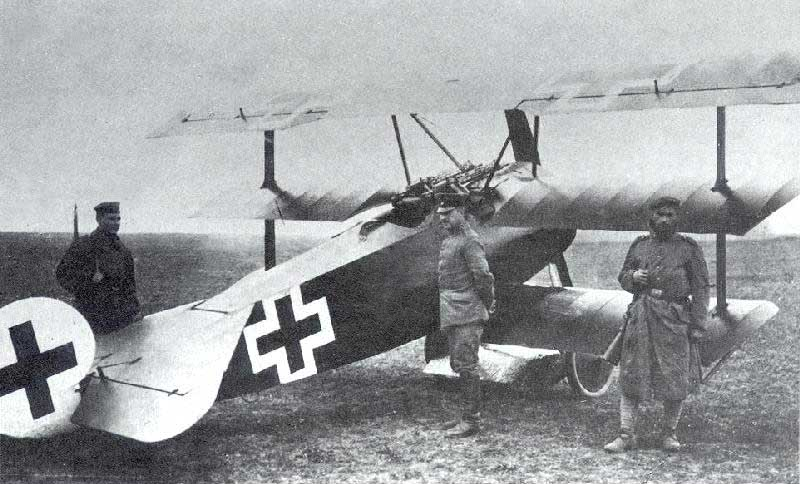
Manfred von Richthofen's red Dr.I, serial 425/17

As Hemer noted, the Dr.I was considerably slower than contemporary Allied fighters in level flight and in a dive. While initial rate of climb was excellent, performance fell off dramatically at higher altitudes because of the low compression of the Oberursel Ur.II, a clone of the Le Rhône 9J rotary engine. As the war continued, chronic shortages of castor oil made rotary operation increasingly difficult. The poor quality of German ersatz lubricant resulted in many engine failures, particularly during the summer of 1918.

The Dr.I suffered other deficiencies. The pilot's view was poor during takeoff and landing. The cockpit was cramped and furnished with materials of inferior quality. Furthermore, the proximity of the gun butts to the cockpit, combined with inadequate crash padding, left the pilot vulnerable to serious head injury in the event of a crash landing.

=== Wing failures ===
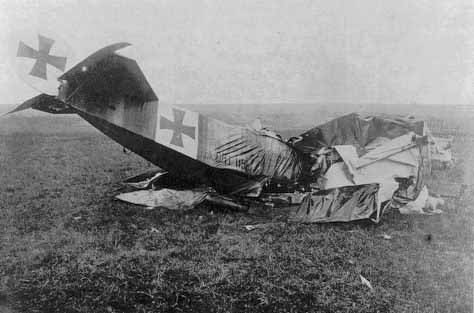
Heinrich Gontermann's wrecked Dr.I 115/17

On 29 October 1917, Leutnant der Reserve Heinrich Gontermann, Staffelführer of Jasta 15, was performing aerobatics when his triplane broke up. Gontermann was killed in the ensuing crash landing. Leutnant der Reserve Günther Pastor of Jasta 11 was killed two days later when his triplane broke up in level flight. Inspection of the wrecked aircraft showed that the wings had been poorly constructed. Examination of other high-time triplanes confirmed these findings. On 2 November, Idflieg grounded all remaining triplanes pending an inquiry. Idflieg convened a Sturzkommission (crash commission), which concluded that poor construction and lack of waterproofing had allowed moisture to damage the wing structure. This caused the wing ribs to disintegrate and the ailerons to break away in flight.

In response to the crash investigation, Fokker was forced to improve quality control on the production line, particularly varnishing of the wing spars and ribs, to combat moisture. Fokker also strengthened the rib structures and the attachment of the auxiliary spars to the ribs. Existing triplanes were repaired and modified at Fokker's expense. After testing a modified wing at Adlershof, Idflieg authorized the triplane's return to service on 28 November 1917. Production resumed in early December. By January 1918, Jastas 6 and 11 were fully equipped with the triplane. Only 14 squadrons used the Dr.I as their primary equipment. Most of these units were part of Jagdgeschwadern I, II, or III. Frontline inventory peaked in late April 1918, with 171 aircraft in service on the Western Front.

Despite corrective measures, the Dr.I continued to suffer from wing failures. On 3 February 1918, Leutnant Hans Joachim Wolff of Jasta 11 successfully landed after suffering a failure of the upper wing leading edge and ribs. On 18 March 1918, Lothar von Richthofen, Staffelführer of Jasta 11, suffered a failure of the upper wing leading edge during combat with Sopwith Camels of No. 73 Squadron and Bristol F.2Bs of No. 62 Squadron. Richthofen was seriously injured in the ensuing crash landing.

Postwar research revealed that poor workmanship was not the only cause of the triplane's structural failures. In 1929, National Advisory Committee for Aeronautics investigations found that the upper wing carried a higher lift coefficient than the lower wing – at high speeds, it could be 2.55 times as much.

The triplane's chronic structural problems destroyed any prospect of large-scale orders. Production eventually ended in May 1918, by which time only 320 had been manufactured. The Dr.I was withdrawn from frontline service, as the Fokker D.VII entered widespread service in June and July. Jasta 19 was the last squadron to be fully equipped with the Dr.I.

Surviving triplanes were distributed to training and home-defense units. Several training aircraft were re-engined with the 75 kW (100 hp) Goebel Goe.II. At the time of the armistice, many remaining triplanes were assigned to fighter-training schools at Nivelles, Belgium, and Valenciennes, France. Allied pilots tested several of these triplanes and found their handling qualities to be impressive.

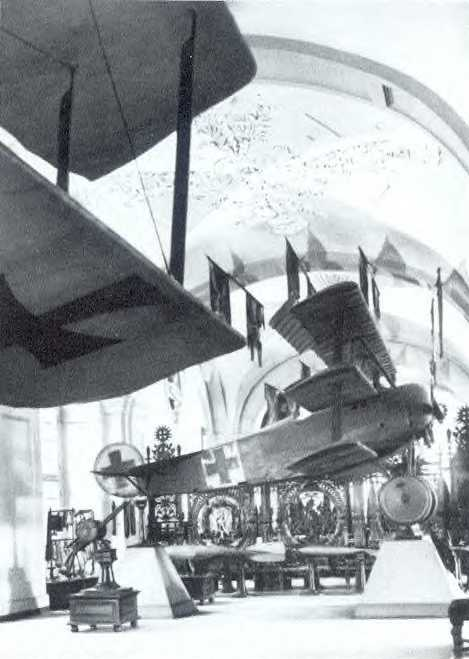
One of Richthofen's Fokker Dr.Is on display at the Zeughaus

=== Experimental engines ===
Several Dr.Is were used as testbeds for experimental engines. One aircraft, designated V.7, was fitted with the Siemens-Halske Sh.III birotary engine. The V.7 exhibited exceptional rate of climb and ceiling, but it proved difficult to handle. Serial 108/17 was used to test the 118 kW (160 hp) Goebel Goe. III, while serial 469/17 was used to test the 108 kW (145 hp) Oberursel Ur. III. None of these engines was used on production aircraft. One triplane was used as a testbed for an experimental Schwade gear-driven supercharger.

== Postwar ==
Three triplanes are known to have survived the armistice. Serial 528/17 was retained as a testbed by the Deutschen Versuchsanstalt für Luftfahrt (German Aviation Research Institute) at Adlershof. After being used in the filming of two movies, 528/17 is believed to have crashed sometime in the late 1930s. Serial 152/17, in which Manfred von Richthofen obtained three victories, was displayed at the Zeughaus Museum in Berlin. This aircraft was destroyed in an Allied bombing raid during World War II.

In 1932, Fokker assembled a Dr.I from existing components. It was displayed in the Deutsche Luftfahrt-Sammlung in Berlin. In 1943, the aircraft was destroyed in an Allied bombing raid. Today, only a few original Dr.I artifacts survive in museums.

== Variants ==
- V.4 – Initial prototype
- V.5 – First production prototype
- V.6 – Enlarged prototype with Mercedes D.II engine
- V.7 – Prototype with Siemens-Halske Sh.III engine
- Vagel Grip SP.5 Greif – German postwar two-seat copy of the Dr.I

== Operators ==
German Empire

- Luftstreitkräfte

== Replica and reproduction aircraft ==
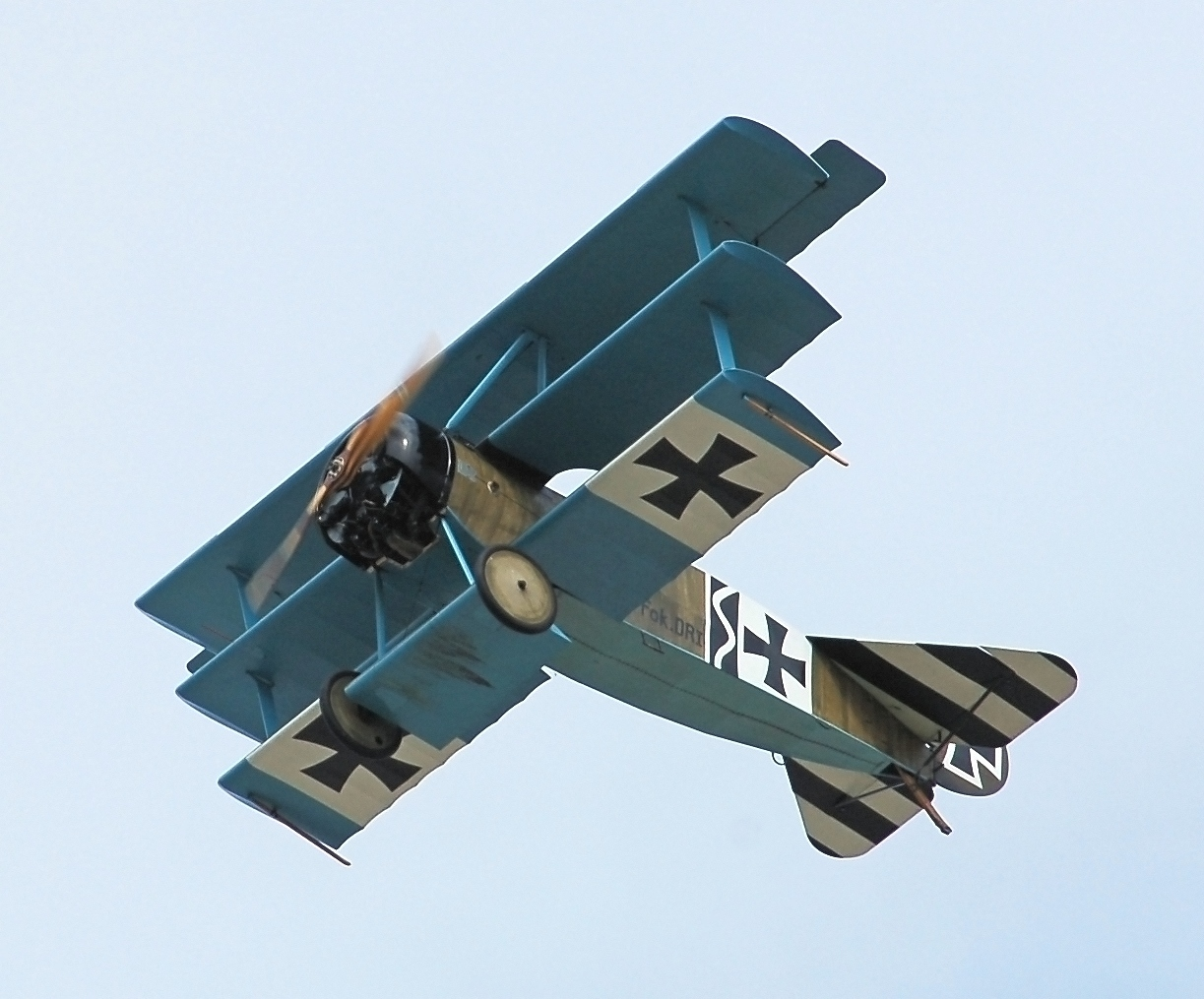
Dr.I replica at Filton Aerodrome, United Kingdom

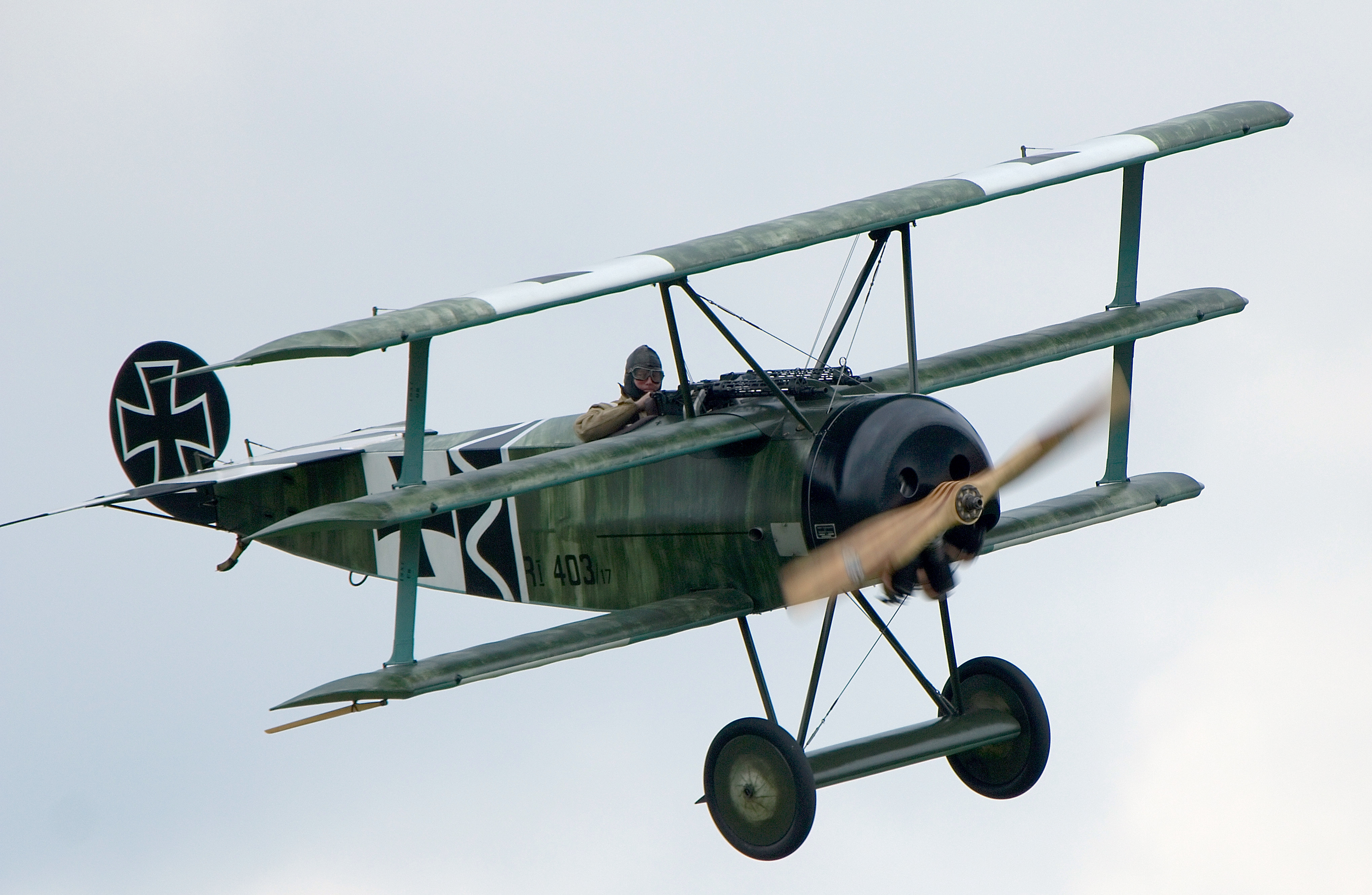
Dr.I replica

Large numbers of replica and reproduction aircraft have been built for both individuals and museums. Because of the expense and scarcity of authentic rotary engines, most airworthy replicas are powered by a Warner Scarab or Continental R-670 radial engine. A few, however, feature vintage Le Rhône 9J or reproduction Oberursel Ur.II rotary engines.

== Specifications (Dr.I) ==
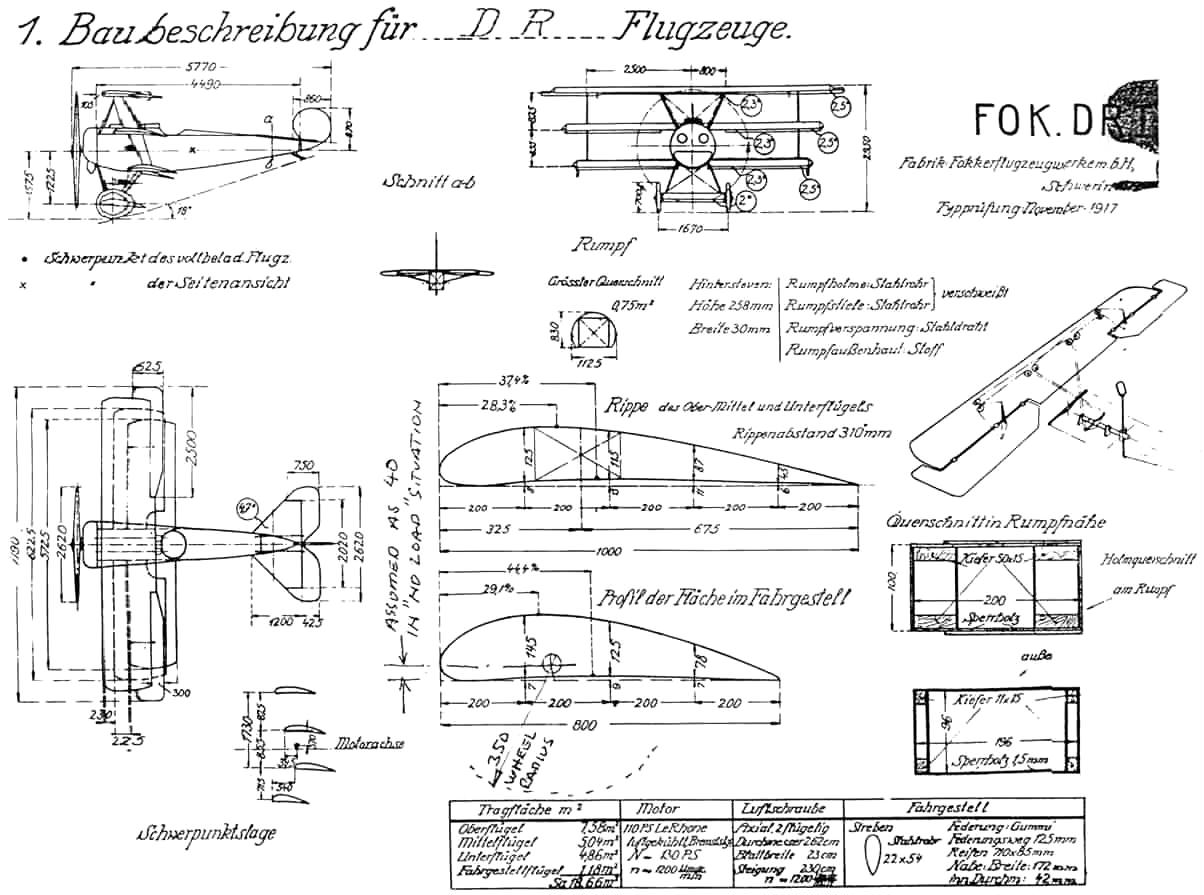
Official Baubeschreibung drawing

Data from Quest for Performance.

General characteristics

- Crew: 1
- Length: 5.77 m (18 ft 11 in)
- Upper wingspan: 7.19 m (23 ft 7 in)
- Height: 2.95 m (9 ft 8 in)
- Wing area: 18.7 m^{2} (201 sq ft)
- Aspect ratio: 4.04
- Empty weight: 406 kg (895 lb)
- Gross weight: 586 kg (1,291 lb)
- Powerplant: 1 × Oberursel Ur.II 9-cylinder air-cooled rotary piston engine, 82 kW (110 hp)
- Propellers: 2-bladed fixed-pitch wooden propeller

Performance

- Maximum speed: 180 km/h (110 mph, 97 kn) at 2600m
- Stall speed: 72 km/h (45 mph, 39 kn)
- Range: 300 km (190 mi, 160 nmi)
- Service ceiling: 6,100 m (20,000 ft)
- Rate of climb: 5.7 m/s (1,120 ft/min)
- Lift-to-drag: 8:1
- Wing loading: 31.0 kg/m^{2} (6.3 lb/sq ft)
- Zero-lift drag coefficient: 0.0323
- Frontal area at zero-lift drag coefficient: 0.62 m^{2} (6.7 sq ft)

Armament

- Guns: 2 × 7.92 mm (0.312 in) Maschinengewehr 08 "Spandau" machine guns

== See also ==
- Airdrome Fokker DR-1, homebuilt replica
- Redfern Fokker Dr.1, homebuilt replica
- Sands Fokker Dr.1 Triplane, homebuilt replica

Aircraft of comparable role, configuration, and era

- Sopwith Camel
- Sopwith Triplane
