= Rate of climb =

Aircraft vertical velocity during flight

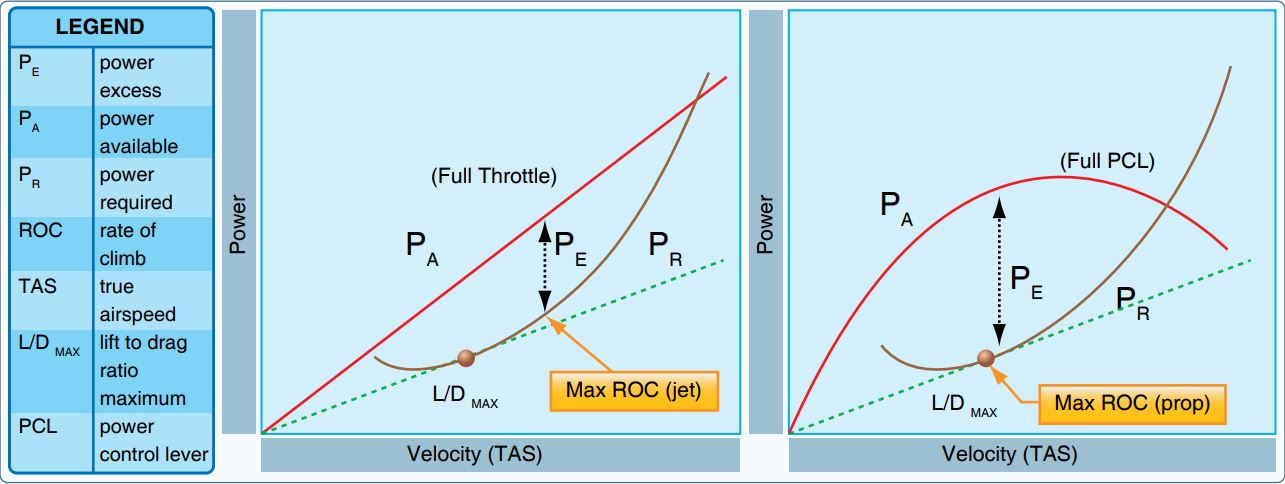
Best rate of climb for a jet and a propeller aircraft

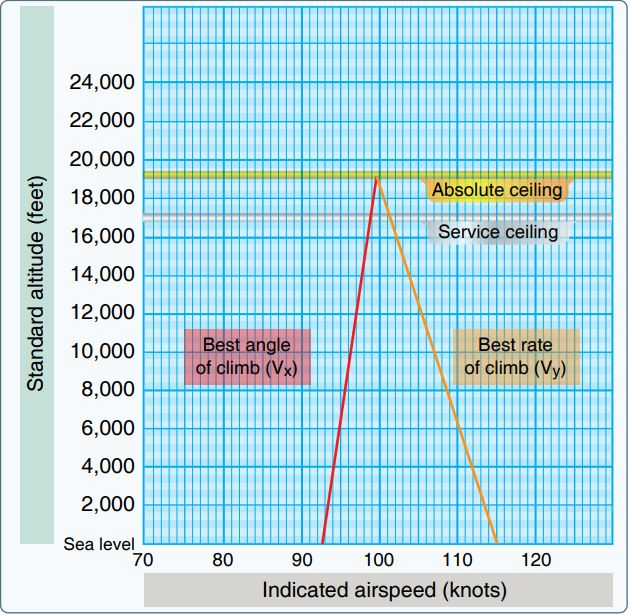
Best rate of climb as a function of altitude

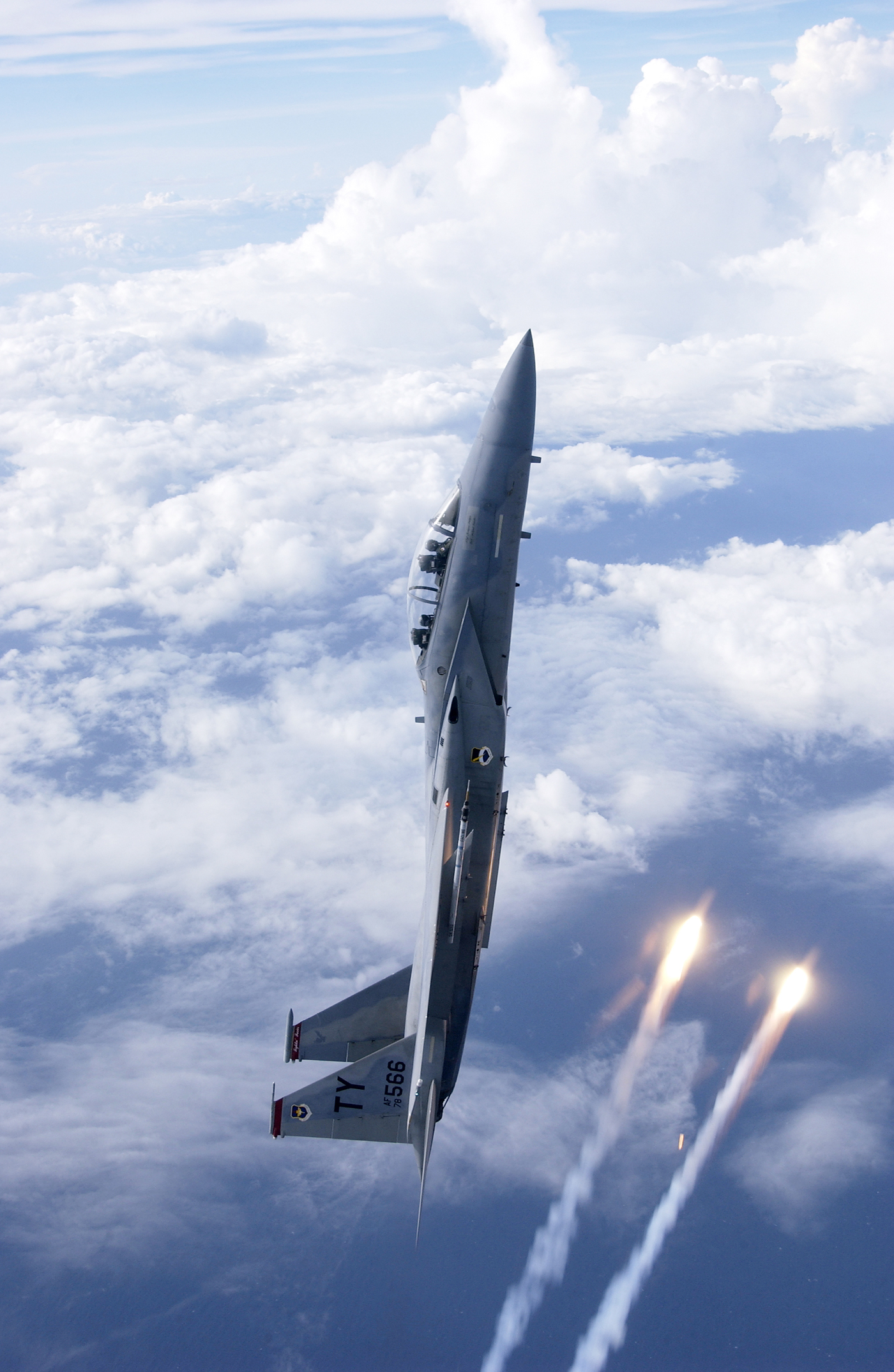
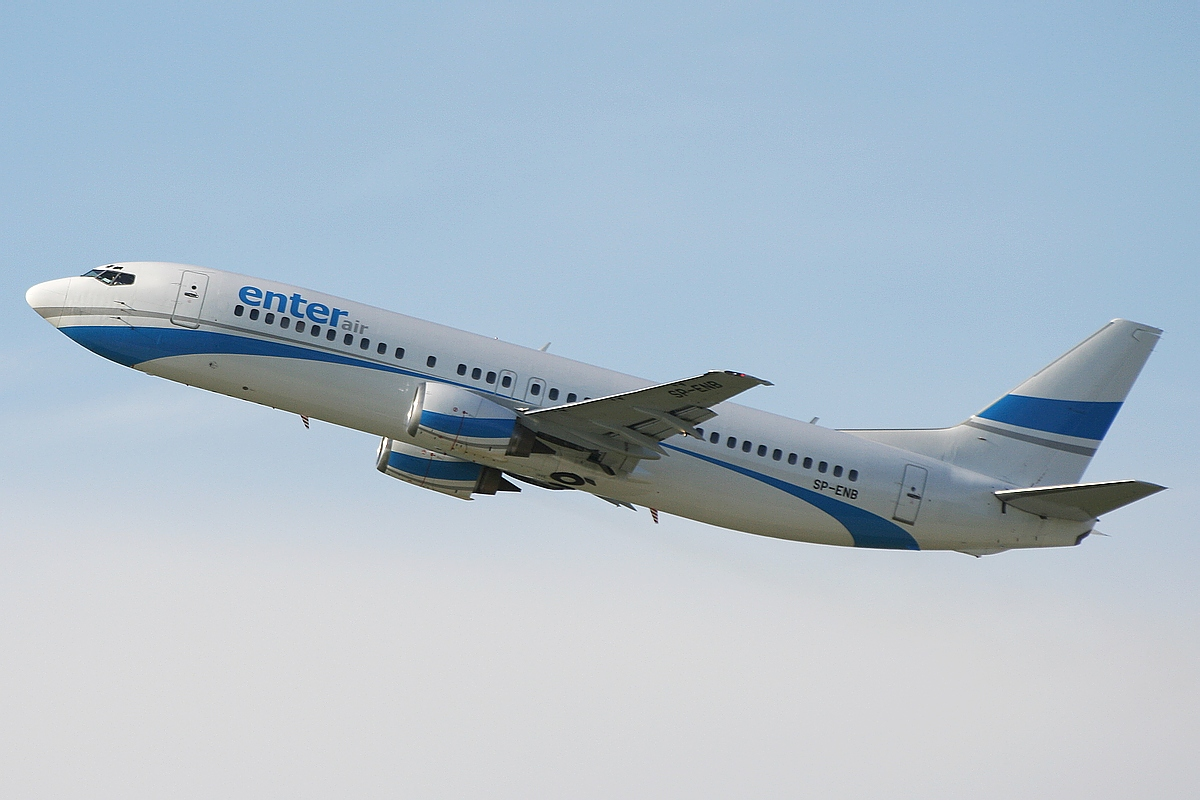
An F-15 Eagle climbing and releasing flares (left), and a Boeing 737 climbing with typical angle of attack for civil airplanes, to give optimal rate of climb (right)

In aeronautics, the rate of climb (RoC) is an aircraft's vertical speed, that is the positive or negative rate of altitude change with respect to time. In most ICAO member countries, even in otherwise metric countries, this is usually expressed in feet per minute (ft/min); elsewhere, it is commonly expressed in metres per second (m/s). The RoC in an aircraft is indicated with a vertical speed indicator (VSI) or instantaneous vertical speed indicator (IVSI).

The temporal rate of decrease in altitude is referred to as the rate of descent (RoD) or sink rate. A negative rate of climb corresponds to a positive rate of descent: RoD = −RoC.

== Speed and rate of climb ==
There are a number of designated airspeeds relating to optimum rates of ascent, the two most important of which are V_{X} and V_{Y}.

V_{X} is the indicated forward airspeed for best angle of climb. This is the speed at which an aircraft gains the most altitude in a given horizontal distance, typically used to avoid a collision with an object a short distance away. By contrast, V_{Y} is the indicated airspeed for best rate of climb, a rate which allows the aircraft to climb to a specified altitude in the minimum amount of time regardless of the horizontal distance required. Except at the aircraft's ceiling, where they are equal, V_{X} is always lower than V_{Y}.

Climbing at V_{X} allows pilots to maximize altitude gain per horizontal distance. This occurs at the speed for which the difference between thrust and drag is the greatest (maximum excess thrust). In a jet airplane, this is approximately minimum drag speed, occurring at the bottom of the drag vs. speed curve.

Climbing at V_{Y} allows pilots to maximize altitude gain per time. This occurs at the speed where the difference between engine power and the power required to overcome the aircraft's drag is greatest (maximum excess power).

V_{x} increases with altitude and V_{Y} decreases with altitude until they converge at the airplane's absolute ceiling, the altitude above which the airplane cannot climb in steady flight.

The Cessna 172 is a four-seat aircraft. At maximum weight it has V_{Y} of 75 kn (139 km/h) indicated airspeed providing a rate of climb of 721 ft/min (3.66 m/s).

Rate of climb at maximum power for a small aircraft is typically specified in its normal operating procedures but for large jet airliners it is usually mentioned in emergency operating procedures.

== Variometer ==
In aviation, a variometer – also known as a rate of climb and descent indicator (RCDI), rate-of-climb indicator, vertical speed indicator (VSI), or vertical velocity indicator (VVI) – is one of the flight instruments in an aircraft used to inform the pilot of the rate of descent or climb. It can be calibrated in metres per second, feet per minute (1 ft/min = 0.00508 m/s) or knots (1 kn ≈ 0.514 m/s), depending on country and type of aircraft. It is typically connected to the aircraft's external static pressure source.

In powered flight, the pilot makes frequent use of the VSI to ascertain that level flight is being maintained, especially during turning maneuvers. In gliding, the instrument is used almost continuously during normal flight, often with an audible output, to inform the pilot of rising or sinking air. It is usual for gliders to be equipped with more than one type of variometer. The simpler type does not need an external source of power and can therefore be relied upon to function regardless of whether a battery or power source has been fitted. The electronic type with audio needs a power source to be operative during the flight. The instrument is of little interest during launching and landing, with the exception of aerotow, where the pilot will usually want to avoid releasing in sink.

The vertical speed indicator from a Robinson R22. This is the most common type used in aircraft, showing vertical speed in feet per minute (ft/min).

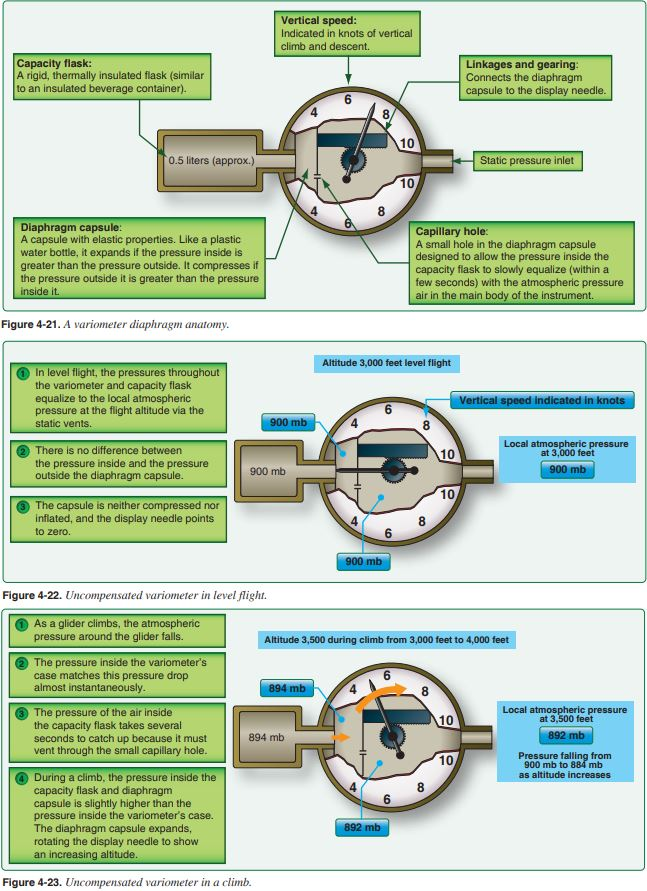
Diaphragm Variometer operation

== See also ==
- ICAO recommendations on use of the International System of Units
- Climb (aeronautics)
- Descent (aeronautics)
- V speeds
