= Nieuport Nighthawk =

Nighthawk
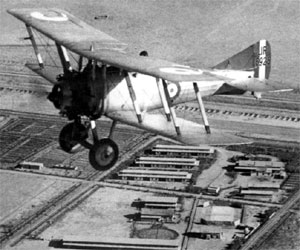
- Nieuport Nighthawk

General information
- Type: Fighter
- Manufacturer: Nieuport & General Aircraft
- Primary users: Royal Air Force Greece

History
- Introduction date: 1923
- First flight: 1919
- Retired: 1938 Hellenic Air Force
- Variants: Nieuport Nightjar; Gloster Sparrowhawk

The Nieuport Nighthawk was a British fighter aircraft developed by the Nieuport & General Aircraft company for the Royal Air Force towards the end of the First World War. Although ordered into production before the aircraft first flew, it did not enter large scale service with the RAF owing to unreliable engines. Re-engined aircraft did see service in Greece, serving from 1923 to 1938.

== Design and development ==
The Nieuport & General Aircraft Co. Ltd. was formed on 16 November 1916 to produce French Nieuport aircraft under licence. During 1917, hiring Henry Folland as chief designer, the company started to design its own aircraft, with the first type, the Nieuport B.N.1 fighter (the designation signifying British Nieuport) flying early in 1918.

To produce a fighter to replace the Sopwith Snipe in service with the RAF, the Air Ministry produced RAF Specification Type 1 for a single-seat fighter to be powered by the ABC Dragonfly engine. This was a radial engine under development which was meant to deliver 340 hp (254 kW) while weighing only 600 lb (272 kg), and on the basis of the promised performance, was ordered into production in large numbers. The design was also projected as a shipboard fighter, although this was considered a secondary role.

To meet this requirement, Folland designed the Nighthawk, a wooden two-bay biplane. An initial order for 150 Nighthawks was placed in August 1918, well before prototypes or flight-ready engines were available, with the first prototype, serial number F-2909 flying in April or May 1919. By this time, it was clear that the Dragonfly had serious problems, being prone to extreme overheating (which was so severe as to char propeller hubs), high fuel consumption and severe vibration (inadvertently being designed to run at its resonance frequency). When the engine could be persuaded to work, the Nighthawk showed excellent performance, but in September 1919, it was finally recognised that the Dragonfly was unsalvagable and the engine programme was cancelled, although by this time 1,147 engines had been delivered.

Seventy Nighthawks were completed by Nieuport and the Gloucestershire Aircraft Company, with a further 54 airframes without engines being completed. Small numbers of Dragonfly-powered Nighthawks were delivered to the Royal Aeronautical Establishment (R.A.E.) at Farnborough, but in that form did not enter operational service.

== Operational history ==
Nieuport built a sport aircraft, the L.C.1 (Land Commercial) Nighthawk with the first civil registered aircraft, K-151 appearing on 21 June 1919 at the first postwar Aerial Derby at Hendon. An additional Nighthawk prototype (H8553) was fitted with a hydrovane and was tested in a shipboard configuration at the Isle of Grain in 1920. In a vain attempt to work out the problems with the Dragonfly engine, four Nighthawks were also retained by the R.A.E. with experiments carried out in 1920–21. The K-151 was further converted to a two-seater with a new cockpit fitted forward of the pilot's position and was sent to India and Malaya in 1920 for a series of sales-promotion flights. After completing the first "newspaper" flight from Bombay to Poona in February 1920, delivering newspapers, the sales demonstrator was sold to India in September 1920.

A new civil Nighthawk, registered G-EAJY, again modified to a two-seater, had its wingspan reduced by two ft and was flown at the 1920 Aerial Derby where it placed fourth at an average speed of 132.67 mph (213.51 km/h). After appearing in the 1921 event, the aircraft was privately sold. A much-modified Nighthawk appeared in 1920, designated the Goshawk with the aircraft incorporating a more streamlined fuselage, rounded tips on the upper wings and a tightly cowled engine installation. In testing, the Goshawk reached 166.5 mph (268.0 km/h), a British record at the time. On 12 July 1921 the Goshawk was destroyed when Harry Hawker fatally crashed while practising for the 1921 Aerial Derby.

=== Gloster variants ===
Nieuport & General closed down in August 1920, and the rights to the Nighthawk were purchased by the Gloster Aircraft Company, who also hired Folland as chief designer. Gloster proceeded to produce a number of derivatives of the Nighthawk, using stocks of Nighthawk components acquired by the company from the cancelled production run, calling them the Gloster Mars.

The first of these derivatives was the Mars I (or Bamel) racing aircraft. Powered by a 450 hp (336 kW) Napier Lion II engine, this used a Nighthawk undercarriage, rear fuselage and tail with new, single-bay wings, first flying on 20 June 1921. It was modified progressively to reduce drag and increase speed, with the wing area at one stage being reduced from the original 205 ft^{2} (19.0m^{2}) to 165 ft^{2} (15.3 m^{2}), in this form setting a British speed record of 196.4 mph (313.3 km/h). In 1922, the aircraft made an attempt on the world air speed record. Although the recorded speed of 212.15 mph (342 km/h) was faster than the existing record, it did not exceed it by the required margin, so the record was not recognised. In 1923, this aircraft was modified with new wings and a more powerful Lion engine as the Gloster I. The Gloster I was sold to the RAF in December 1923, being fitted with floats and used as a Trainer for the High Speed Flight RAF, being scrapped in 1927.

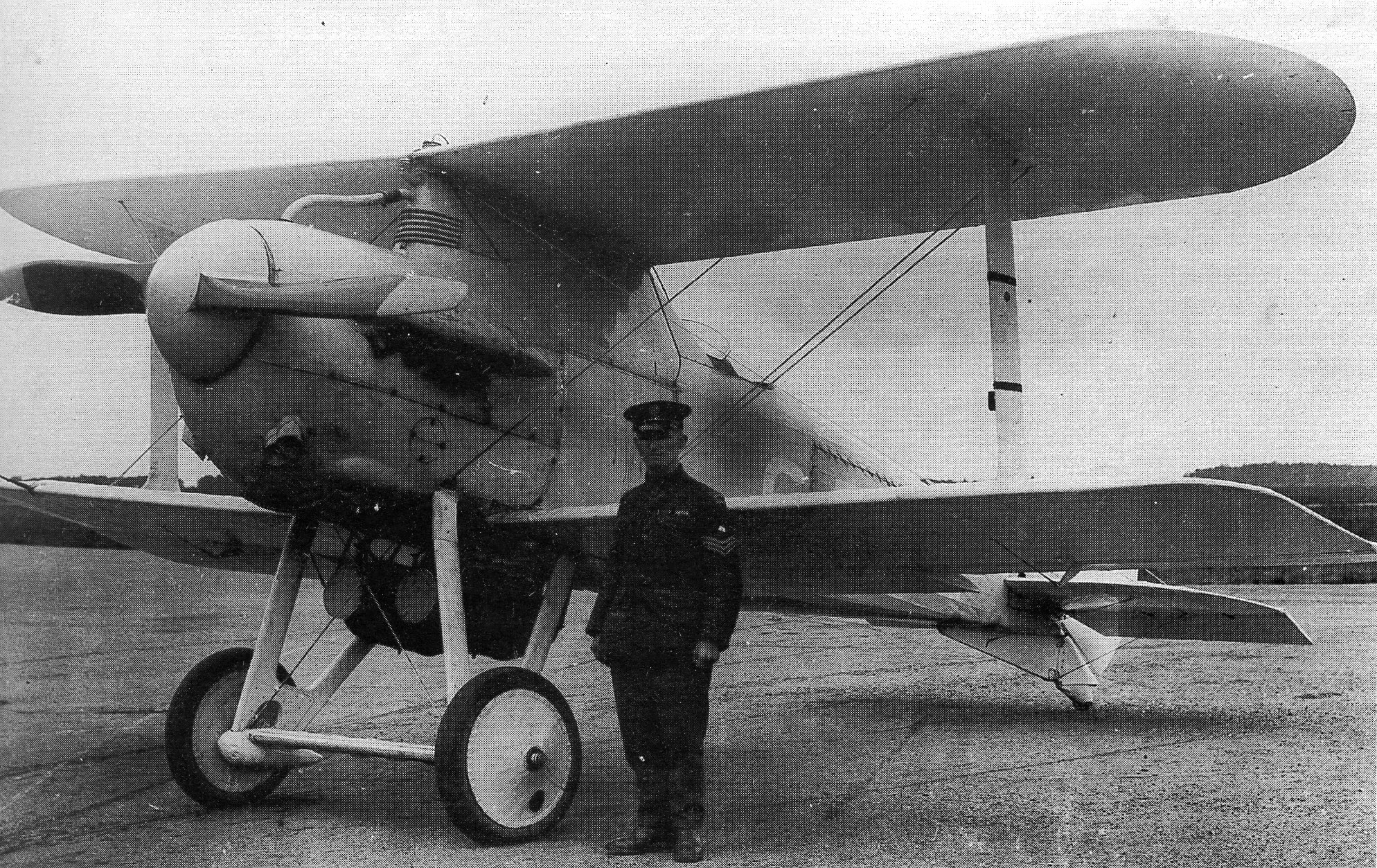
The Gloster Mars I

The Mars I, after conversion to the Gloster I, was fitted with floats and used as a training seaplane for the British 1925 and 1927 Schneider Trophy teams, remaining in use until 1930.

The Gloster Sparrowhawk (or Mars II, III and IV) was a naval fighter for Japan, powered by the Bentley BR2 rotary engine. The Japanese Sparrowhawks were flown from the Yokosuka Naval Base as well as from platforms built on gun turrets of warships. The Nightjar (known as the Mars X) was a similar carrier fighter for the RAF.

A further factory conversion of a Mars III (civil registered as G-EAYN) led to the Gloster Grouse I powered by a 185 hp Siddeley Lynx, that became the prototype for a small production run of Grouse II for Sweden. The Grouse series was the progenitor of the later Gloster Grebe.

The Gloster Nighthawk, or Mars VI, replaced the Dragonfly with either an Armstrong-Siddeley Jaguar or a Bristol Jupiter radial. In 1922, the RAF acquired 29 aircraft converted from Nieuport Nighthawks, powered by both Jaguar and Jupiter engines, while Greece purchased 25 Jaguar powered fighters.

Three of the RAF's Gloster Nighthawks were sent to Iraq in 1923 for more extensive evaluation, being tested by No 1, 8 and 55 Squadrons. The 25 Greek aircraft were delivered in 1923, remaining in service until 1938.

The final Nighthawk variant was the Mars X or Nightjar naval fighter powered by a 230 hp Bentley B.R. 2. All of the series of 22 Nightjars were converted from available stocks of original Nighthawks. Nightjars were used operationally during the Chanak Crisis in 1922 and were operated from H.M.S. Argus from 1922–1924.

== Variants ==
Nieuport Nighthawk
Original production version. Powered by 320 ABC Dragonfly engine.
Nieuport L.C.1.
Civil version, appearing in both single- and two-seater configurations.
Nieuport Goshawk.
Civil version, one completed as an air racer.
Gloster Bamel (Mars 1)
Racing derivative of Nighthawk. Powered by 450 hp Napier Lion engine. One built
Gloster 1
Rebuild of Mars 1 with more powerful engine and smaller wing.
Gloster Sparrowhawk (Mars II, III and IV)
Naval fighter for Japan.
Gloster Grouse (I and II)
Nighthawk conversion with smaller lower wing, equipped with 185 hp Siddeley Lynx
Gloster Nighthawk (Mars VI)
Rebuild of Nighthawk with Armstrong Siddeley Jaguar II or Bristol Jupiter III engine.
Nieuport Nightjar (Mars X)
Naval fighter for RAF, equipped with a 230 hp Bentley B.R.2.

== Operators ==
Greece

- Hellenic Air Force

Japan

- Imperial Japanese Navy Air Service

Sweden

- Swedish Air Force

United Kingdom

- Royal Air Force
  - No. 1 Squadron RAF
  - No. 8 Squadron RAF
  - No. 203 Squadron RAF
  - High Speed Flight RAF
- Royal Navy
  - No. 401 Flight

== Specifications (Nighthawk [Dragonfly Engine]) ==
Data from The British Fighter since 1912

General characteristics

- Crew: One
- Length: 18 ft 6 in (5.64 m)
- Wingspan: 28 ft 0 in (8.53 m)
- Height: 9 ft 6 in (2.90 m)
- Wing area: 276 sq ft (25.6 m^{2})
- Empty weight: 1,500 lb (680 kg)
- Gross weight: 2,218 lb (1,006 kg)
- Fuel capacity: 40 imp gal (48 US gal; 180 L)
- Powerplant: 1 × ABC Dragonfly I 9-cylinder radial engine, 320 hp (240 kW)
- Propellers: 2-bladed wooden fixed pitch propeller

Performance

- Maximum speed: 151 mph (243 km/h, 131 kn) at sea level
- Endurance: 3 hr
- Service ceiling: 24,500 ft (7,500 m)
- Time to altitude: 7 min 10 s to 10,000 ft (3,000 m)

Armament

- Guns: 2 × fixed forward-firing .303 in (7.7 mm) Vickers machine guns

== See also ==
Related development

- Gloster II
- Gloster Sparrowhawk
- Nieuport Nightjar

Aircraft of comparable role, configuration, and era

- Armstrong Whitworth Ara
- Armstrong Whitworth Siskin
- BAT Basilisk
- Sopwith Dragon
- Sopwith Snapper
- Sopwith Snark

Related lists

- List of aircraft of the Royal Air Force
