= Handley Page Type S =

HPS-1
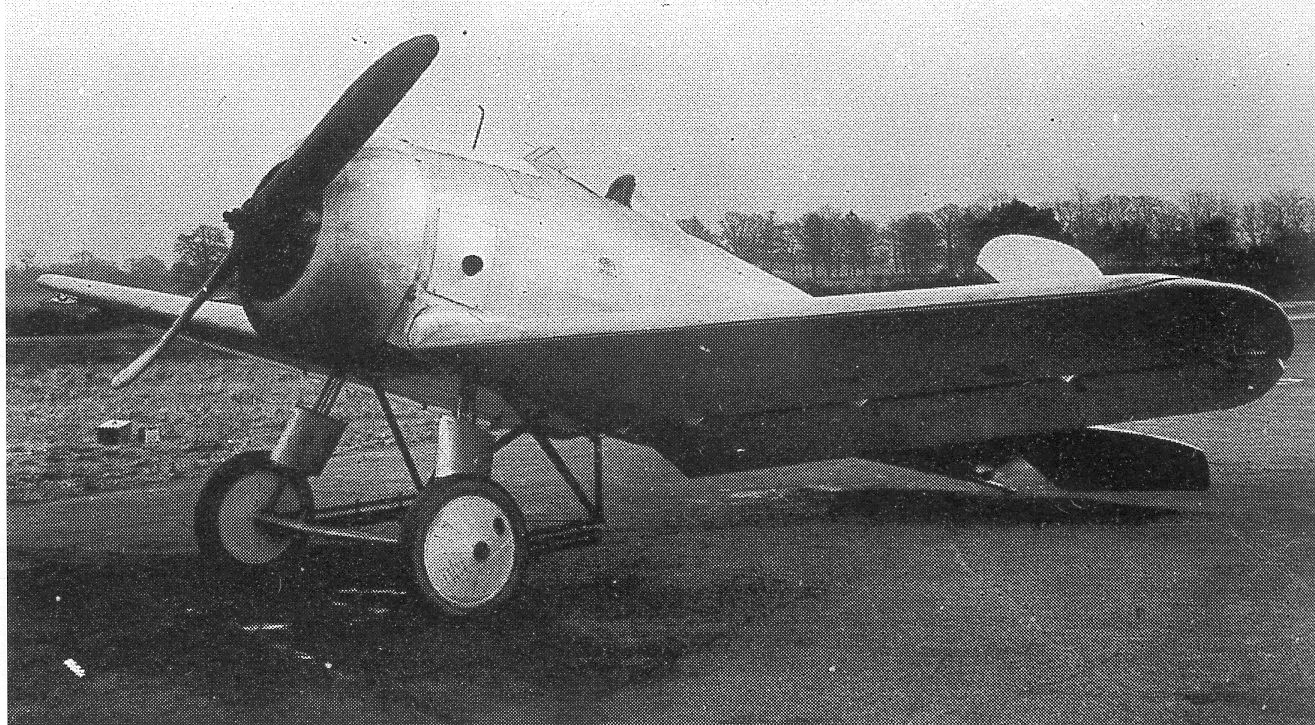

General information
- Type: Fighter
- National origin: United Kingdom
- Manufacturer: Handley Page
- Status: Prototype
- Number built: 2

History
- First flight: 7 September 1923

The Handley Page Type S, or HPS-1 was a prototype British carrier-based fighter developed for the United States Navy in the early 1920s. A low-wing monoplane, it was unsuccessful, only two being built and flown.

== Development and design ==
In 1921 the United States Navy drew up a specification for a single-seat fighter aircraft capable of operating either as a landplane from its aircraft carriers or from the water as a seaplane, seeking designs from both American and European companies. The British aircraft manufacturer Handley Page, which had recently developed the leading edge slot, realised use of slots and flaps could allow a high-speed monoplane to fly at the low speeds needed for carrier operations with a much higher wing loading than a normal biplane, and decided to develop an aircraft to meet this requirement. The resulting design, given the Handley Page designation Type S (and later retrospectively known as the H.P.21) was a small, low-wing cantilever monoplane, with full-span leading edge slots and full-span slotted flaps. The airframe was a plywood monocoque, with the fuselage capable of being broken into two sections for storage on board ship. It had a tailwheel undercarriage that could be replaced by two floats. Although designed to use engines of up to 400 hp (298 kW), the prototypes were fitted with a much less powerful surplus Bentley BR2 rotary engine.

The US Navy placed an order for three prototypes, designated HPS-1 (Handley Page Scout) in the contemporary US Navy designation system. The first prototype flew on 7 September 1923, but proved to have poor handling, with the rudder proving to be ineffective. The second prototype was built with its wings fitted with six degrees of dihedral, flying in February 1924. It had much improved handling, and showed good speed at low level. However, when undergoing full load trials for the US Navy at Martlesham Heath, it was wrecked when its undercarriage collapsed on landing, and the US Navy cancelled the contract, with the third prototype, intended to be a floatplane, not completed.

== Operators ==
United States

- United States Navy

== Specifications (Type S) ==
Data from Handley Page Aircraft since 1907

General characteristics

- Crew: 1
- Length: 21 ft 5.5 in (6.541 m)
- Wingspan: 29 ft 3 in (8.92 m)
- Height: 9 ft 7 in (2.92 m)
- Wing area: 114.5 sq ft (10.64 m^{2})
- Empty weight: 1,320 lb (599 kg)
- Max takeoff weight: 2,030 lb (921 kg)
- Powerplant: 1 × Bentley BR2 9-cylinder air-cooled rotary piston engine, 230 hp (170 kW)
- Propellers: 2-bladed fixed-pitch propeller

Performance

- Maximum speed: 146.5 mph (235.8 km/h, 127.3 kn)
- Stall speed: 44 mph (71 km/h, 38 kn)
- Endurance: 3 hours
- Service ceiling: 21,000 ft (6,400 m)
- Rate of climb: 1,800 ft/min (9.1 m/s)

Armament

- Guns: Provision for 2 × .30 in (7.62 mm) Marlin machine guns

== See also ==
Aircraft of comparable role, configuration, and era

- Gloster Nightjar
- Fairey Flycatcher
- Parnall Plover
