= Gloster Sparrowhawk =

1920s British fighter aircraft

Sparrowhawk
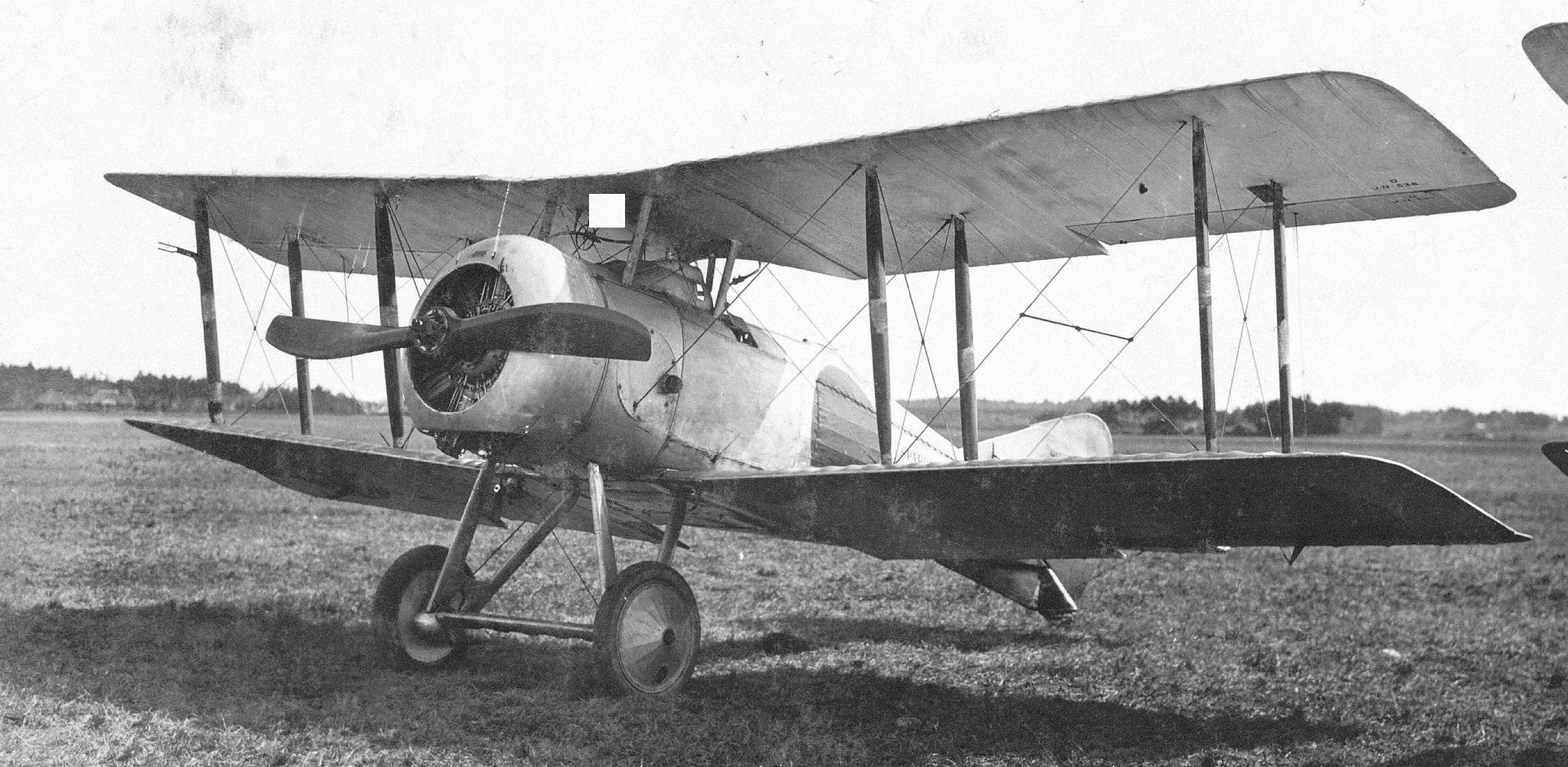

General information
- Type: Fighter
- Manufacturer: Gloster Aircraft Company
- Designer: Henry Folland
- Primary user: Imperial Japanese Navy
- Number built: 91

History
- Introduction date: 1921
- First flight: 1921
- Retired: 1928
- Developed from: Nieuport Nighthawk
- Variant: Gloster Grouse

The Gloster Sparrowhawk was a single-seat fighter aircraft designed and produced during the early 1920s by the British aircraft manufacturer Gloster.

It was developed by aircraft designer Henry Folland, who had recently joined Gloster after the winding up of Nieuport & General; he used the earlier Nieuport Nighthawk fighter as the basis for the new aircraft. The Sparrowhawk was developed as a navalised fighter and trainer aircraft in response to the needs of the Imperial Japanese Navy, which sought to develop its naval air arm with British assistance through the Sempill Mission. A total of 50 aircraft were completed by Gloster within six months of the order's placement, while a further 40 were locally assembled in Japan at the Yokosuka Naval Air Technical Arsenal.

The Sparrowhawk was operated by the Japanese Navy between 1921 and 1928. It was initially used onboard large capital ships, but was quickly displaced from ship-borne duties following the arrival of more capable carrier-based fighters such as the purpose-built Mitsubishi 1MF fighter. Towards its final years, the Sparrowhawk was exclusively operated as a shore-based trainer aircraft, before being succeeded in this capacity as well. A single Sparrowhawk II was built by Gloster as a civil demonstrator, being used for air racing and later converted into the prototype Gloster Grouse.

== Development and design ==
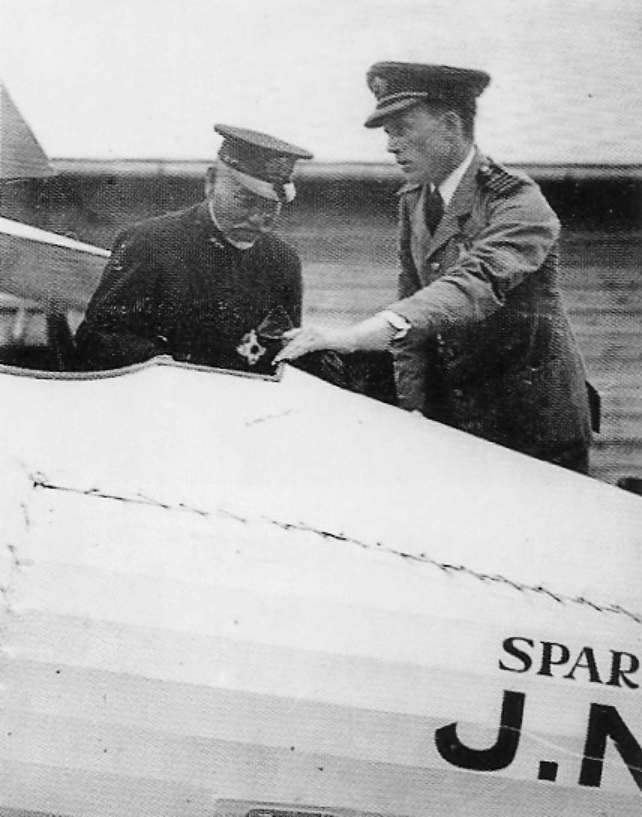
Captain Sempill showing a Sparrowhawk to Admiral Togo Heihachiro, 1921.

Following the closure of the British aircraft manufacturer Nieuport & General during 1920, the services of its chief designer, Henry Folland, were promptly hired by the Gloster Aircraft Company. This firm also acquired the rights for Nieuport's Nighthawk fighter, a promising design that had been let down by its use of the unreliable ABC Dragonfly radial engine. Folland used the Nighthawk as the basis for a series of developments, known as the Gloster Mars series, with both air racer and fighters being produced.

For numerous years after the end of the First World War, there was an apparent lack of appetite within the Air Ministry to pursue or procure new military aircraft, thus British aircraft manufacturers sought out other potential customers, including the air services of various other countries. During January 1921, Britain dispatched the Sempill Mission to Japan, where it advised the Japanese on the development of a Naval Air Arm for the Imperial Japanese Navy. It was determined that Gloster was able to meet the requirements presented by the Japanese Navy, who sought a capable single-seat fighter; this fighter, named Sparrowhawk, was heavily based on the earlier Nighthawk fighter, featuring numerous modified to appropriately navalise it, amongst other attributes.

The Sparrowhawk shared similar construction to the Nighthawk, including an internally-braced fuselage with a wooden girder structure. Both the longerons and main spars were composed of Ash, limited used of metal was made for elements such as the joining plates between the wings and the fuselage. Instead of conventional bolts, tubular rivets were used instead. Amongst the numerous improvements made was the replacement of the original Dragonfly engine with the Bentley BR2 rotary engine. Only the 'Sparrowhawk III model was designed for shipborne operations; as such, aircraft were outfitted with an arrestor hooks attached to the axels of the landing gear, as well as hydrovanes on the struts of the gear to reduce the probability of the aircraft overturning if required to perform an emergency water-based landing; floatation bags were also install in the fuselage to assist with this same eventuality. A quick-release mechanism attached to the landing gear enabled the engine to reach maximum RPM prior to any moment of the aircraft, shortening the takeoff.

The construction of the Sparrowhawk was largely achievable by using the existing stocks of stored Nighthawk components, this approach allowed for Japan's order to be fulfilled within the space of six months. The order comprised 50 Gloster-built aircraft and a further 40 in component form for manufacture at the Yokosuka Naval Air Technical Arsenal. Of the 50 Gloster-built Sparrowhawks, 30 were Sparrowhawk I land based fighters, ten Sparrowhawk II twin-seat advanced trainers and the remaining ten completed as Sparrowhawk III shipboard fighters. The Sparrowhawk IIIs, which were similar to the 22 Gloster Nightjar carrier fighters produced to operate from the Royal Navy's aircraft carriers, were fitted with appropriate equipment for their role. The 40 Yokosuka assembled aircraft were completed as Sparrowhawk Is.

A single additional Sparrowhawk II was built by Gloster for its own use as a civil demonstrator. This aircraft, registered G-EAYN, flew in the 1922 Aerial Derby around London, and was later converted to form the prototype Gloster Grouse.

== Operational history ==
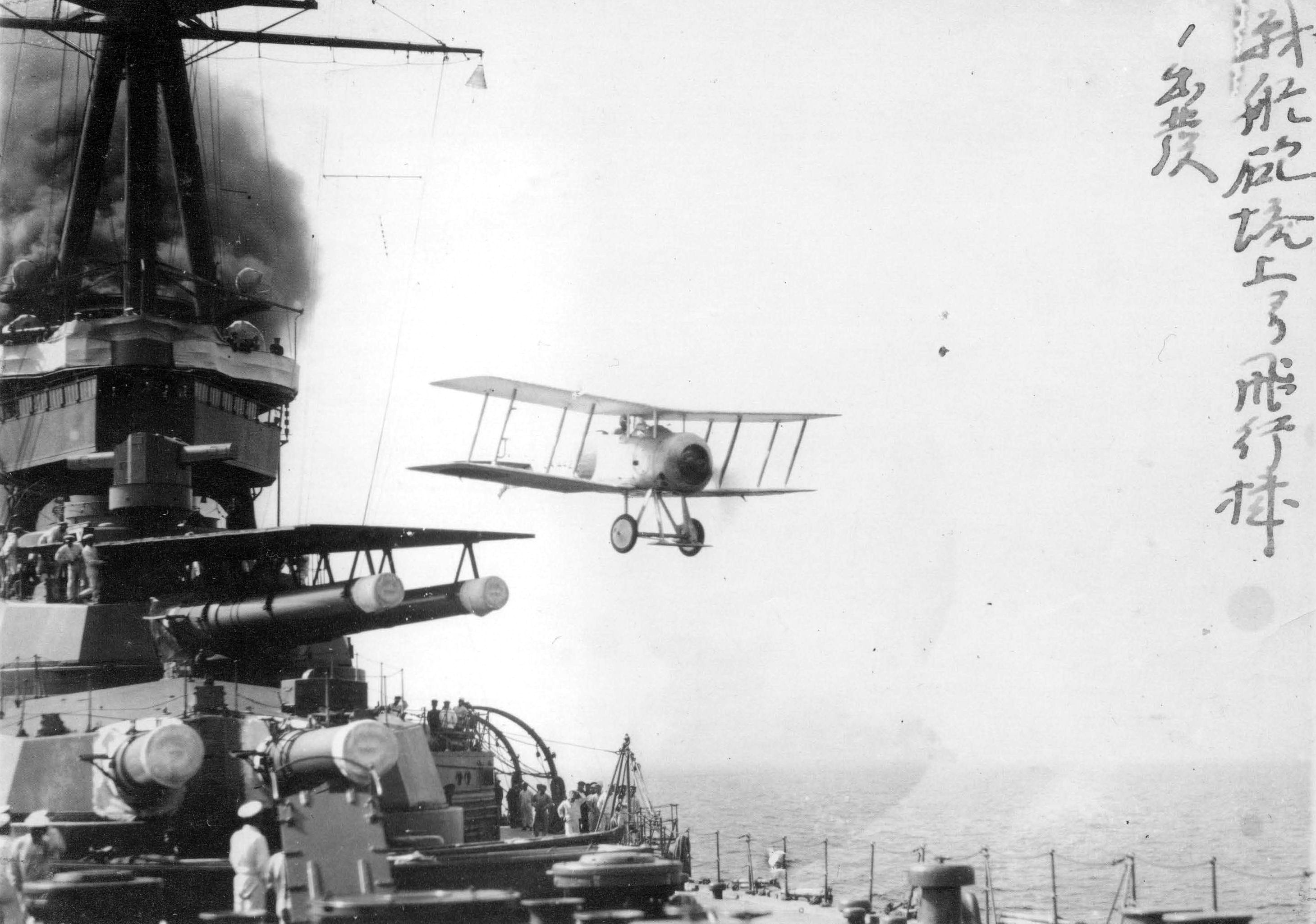
A Sparrowhawk taking off from the B turret platform of the Imperial Japanese Navy battleship Yamashiro off Yokosuka, Japan, on 29 March 1922

The Sparrowhawk entered service with the Japanese Navy during 1921. According to aviation author Derek Jackson, it proved itself to be a quite reliable aircraft in Japanese service, as well as being substantially more advanced than the French-sourced predecessors that had been flown by Japanese pilots prior to their introduction. In order for their use aboard Japanese capital ships, 30ft-long wooden ramps were built on top of the gun turrets of several warships; this allowed for the ramp to be both elevated and turned by the movement of the guns, and thus positioned to favorably take advantage of the winds to launch the fighter.

Initially, the ten Sparrowhawk IIIs were used for flight training operations from ramps built on one of the gun turrets of the battleship Yamashiro, as the carrier Hōshō was not yet ready. Although used for training from the Yamashiro, the Sparrowhawks were never operated from the Hōshō, it being replaced for shipboard operations by the purpose-designed Mitsubishi 1MF fighter before Hōshō entered service. The Sparrowhawk continued in service from shore bases until 1928, when it was withdrawn from use as a trainer.

== Variants ==
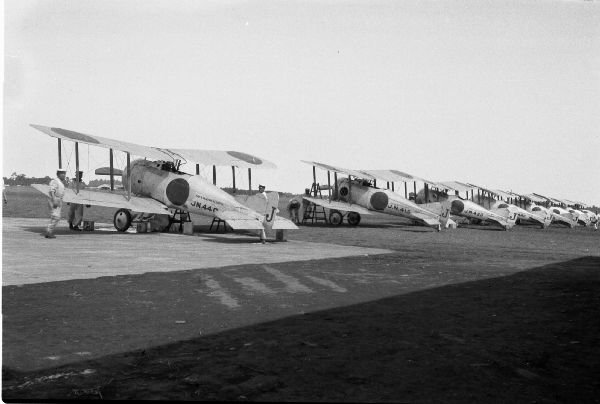
Multiple Sparrowhawks lined up at Kasumigaura Air Field, Ibaraki Prefecture, Japan, circa 1925

Sparrowhawk I
Also known as Mars II. Land-based single-seat fighter. 30 built by Gloster, with further 40 assembled in Japan by Yokosuka Naval Air Technical Arsenal.
Sparrowhawk II
Also known as Mars III. Land-based twin-seat trainer. 11 built.
Sparrowhawk III
Also known as Mars IV. Single-seat carrier fighter. Ten built.

== Operators ==
Japan

- Imperial Japanese Navy

== Specifications (Sparrowhawk III) ==
Data from The Complete Book of Fighters Gloster Aircraft since 1917

General characteristics

- Crew: 1
- Length: 19 ft 8 in (5.99 m)
- Wingspan: 27 ft 11 in (8.51 m)
- Height: 10 ft 6 in (3.20 m)
- Wing area: 270 sq ft (25 m^{2})
- Airfoil: RAF 15
- Empty weight: 1,850 lb (839 kg)
- Gross weight: 2,165 lb (982 kg)
- Powerplant: 1 × Bentley BR2 nine-cylinder air-cooled rotary piston engine, 230 hp (170 kW)
- Propellers: 2-bladed fixed-pitch propeller

Performance

- Maximum speed: 125 mph (201 km/h, 109 kn) at sea level
- Endurance: three hours
- Service ceiling: 16,900 ft (5,200 m)
- Time to altitude: 15,000 ft (4,600 m) in 25 minutes and 30 seconds
- Wing loading: 8.02 lb/sq ft (39.2 kg/m^{2})
- Power/mass: 0.11 hp/lb (0.18 kW/kg)

Armament

- Guns: 2 x fixed forward-firing .303 in (7.7 mm) Vickers guns

== See also ==
Related development

- Nieuport Nighthawk
- Nieuport Nightjar
- Gloster Grouse
