= SCORPION program =

The SCORPION (Self CORrecting Projectile for Infantry OperatioN) program was a research initiative funded by the U.S. Defense Advanced Research Projects Agency (DARPA) and led by the U.S. Army Research Laboratory (ARL) and the Georgia Institute of Technology to integrate micro adaptive flow control (MAFC) technology into small caliber munitions to develop spinning, guided projectiles. The program led to the creation of a spin-stabilized 40 mm grenade, also called SCORPION, that could propel itself to its target by using calculated micro-jet bursts of air to correct its path once launched.

== History ==
The SCORPION program began in 2001 as a joint venture between DARPA, ARL's Weapons and Materials Research Directorate (WMRD), Georgia Tech's Departments of Mechanical Engineering, Electronic and Computer Engineering, and Aerospace Engineering, and Georgia Tech Research Institute's Aerospace, Transportation, and Advanced Systems Laboratory in order to improve the precision of small to medium-sized munitions in complex, dynamic environments. It was guided by the U.S. Army's goals to develop low-cost, smart munitions that could more accurately hit its intended target. In particular, the Army was seeking to produce a new generation of autonomous 20 mm to 40 mm gun-launched projectiles that could correct its course mid-flight. Doing so would increase the capabilities of infantry units as well as decrease the weight of munitions that soldiers would have to carry.

Micro adaptive flow control is largely defined by the active manipulation of aerodynamic flows using small time-dependent actuators in carefully chosen locations. By taking advantage of flow instabilities, the system can generate large amounts of energy from using only a small fraction of the overall flow if the actuators and their activity are properly assigned. As a result, MAFC can enable low power yet highly distributed redundant actuation systems in contrast to flow systems that utilize steady blowing where high velocity flows must be provided through complex and high-loss ducting. Rather than configuring the shape of the munition with fins or canards to control its trajectory, the SCORPION project aimed to integrate these tiny actuators on the munition that pump out brief spurts of air at a high frequency (around 1000 Hz). By emitting these bursts of air for just a few milliseconds at a time, these small synthetic micro-jet actuators were capable of modifying the projectile's flow characteristics and pressure distributions. In short, the jets of air were able to steer the munition by creating an asymmetry in the airflow surrounding the projectile, producing a strong enough force to affect its trajectory largely due to the Coanda effect.

== Development ==
The SCORPION program was divided into two phases, Phase I and Phase II. The former focused on constructing the flight control system and determining whether MAFC could be integrated into a 40 mm round to provide adequate guidance to its target, while the latter prioritized determining whether MAFC technology could be used to steer projectiles that were smaller and even faster than those used in Phase I. By 2005, Phase I had been completed, and the SCORPION program was chosen as a DARPA demonstration program in order to further investigate the use of MAFC in high-velocity, small-diameter projectiles. The SCORPION program concluded in 2007 after successfully demonstrating the use of MCFA to maneuver a 40 mm rifle-launched grenade.

=== Computational fluid dynamics (CFD) modeling ===
A significant portion of the SCORPION program was focused on the development of new computational fluid dynamics (CFD) techniques to model microadaptive flow control and better understand the complex aerodynamic interactions associated with using microjets to control the trajectory of spin-stabilized projectiles. Detailed flow physics simulations were specifically developed to aid in the design of the projectile shape and the placement of the synthetic actuators. Time-accurate unsteady CFD computations were also used to predict where, when, and how the aerodynamic force would interact with the projectile as well as characterize the flow field produced by the synthetic jets for various yaw and spin rates. The models also allowed researchers to explore various firing sequences for the synthetic actuators. During simulations, turbulence was initially modeled using the Reynolds-Averaged Navier-Stokes (RANS) approach. However, the predictions were less accurate than expected when applied in the context of unsteady flows associated with synthetic jets. As a result, a new hybrid approach known as the large eddy simulation (LES) approach was developed to properly account for the large eddies present in the turbulent flow structure while retaining high fidelity. This new approach allowed researchers to accurately calculate the lift force along with other aerodynamic forces that assisted them in the design of the actuator, flight control, and sensor system of the projectile.

=== Wind tunnel tests ===
In order to characterize the air flow that would surround the projectile in the air, researchers conducted a series of wind tunnel tests on a 40 mm grenade model. The tests were also conducted on a spinning wind tunnel model to simulate the airflow of a spinning projectile. These tests primarily served to optimize the placement of the synthetic jets. The wind tunnel tests also helped demonstrate that the aerodynamic surface of the projectile needed to be smooth during an important portion of its trajectory in order for the Coanda effect to generate the necessary divert force. During the wind tunnel experiments, the researchers also took detailed Particle Imaging Velocimetry (PIV) measurements of the airflow traveling downstream of the projectile in order to fine-tune the actuators. Such measurements led to a redesign of the projectile's tail to include a shallow channel for the jet.

=== Flight experiments ===
During development, researchers conducted flight experiments on the SCORPION munition to better understand the type of propellant and cartridge case design they needed in order for the projectile to launch at 0.8 Mach. These experiments took place at the Transonic Experimental Facility at the U.S. Army Research Laboratory and specifically focused on firing 25 mm munitions from a 25 mm barrel. The internal electronics of the munition held devices for recording data, including magnetic field strength, the angular rate in both the pitch and yaw directions, and acceleration in all three orthogonal directions. The flight dynamics of the projectile were then analyzed from the raw data during post-flight processing. The flight tests also served as an opportunity to explore methods of soft recovery for the 25 mm projectile. Doing so allowed ARL scientists to test the idea of using layers of draped Kevlar to safely absorb the kinetic energy of the projectile.

=== Open loop tests ===
The control authority of the SCORPION munition was tested at the ARL Transonic Experimental Facility through a series of open loop tests where the test rounds were preset to move to the left or the right at a fixed time after launch. Using wind tunnel data and modeling software to predict control force magnitudes, ARL scientists demonstrated that the SCORPION munition could be diverted in any direction, showing that the projectile possessed sufficient control authority to correct for trajectory variations. In addition, the munition's electronic and sensor system exhibited a notable level of robustness such that one projectile was reprogrammed and launched ten times and still remained functional afterwards.

=== Challenges ===
One of the main challenges that appeared during the development of the SCORPION munition was the task of integrating all the required components into the 40 mm grenade form factor. In order for the projectile to operate properly, the component not only had to fit inside the munition and still function as an integrated system, but they also had to be able to accurately evaluate the state of the munition while withstanding the high g-force of the gun launch and the high spin rate of the projectile. Another challenge that the researchers encountered during development was the construction of the integrated circuit boards responsible for measuring the state of the round and controlling the actuator. This sensor package included a 3-axis magnetometer, an axial accelerometer, four radial accelerometers, and a 2-axis radial accelerometer, all of which had to fit inside the 40 mm munition and undergo shock testing.

== Projectile design ==
The general design of the 40 mm SCORPION munition was based on the M781BT practice grenade. However, the design of its telemetry and sensor system, which was developed by ARL scientists, was based on ARL's diagnostic fuze (DFuze) sensor system. Used primarily to determine the projectile flight dynamics along the trajectory, the telemetry system consisted of a three-axis magnetometer, four radial accelerometers, an axial accelerometer, a suite of four Yawsondes, and a two-axis accelerometer for transverse acceleration. The magnetometers measured the projectile's orientation to the roll angle and Earth's magnetic field, the accelerometers measured the projectile's acceleration in the x, y, and z directions, and the Yawsondes measured the projectile's angular orientation to the Sun. An encoder board was included in the munition in order to process the sensor data and communicate it to the ground station. Through the use of the magnetometers and the Yawsondes, the angular state of the projectile could be identified. The accelerometers helped measure the accelerations of the SCORPION in the x, y, and z directions, and an encoder board was present inside the projectile to collect the sensor data and send it to the ground station. Due to how 40 mm grenades are spin stabilized and have highly nonlinear aerodynamics, researchers undergone several tests to understand the aerodynamic nonlinearities and flight dynamics of the projectile's trajectory. Experiments with the base model have shown that these projectiles exhibit fast and slow mode angular precession, meaning that the aerodynamic control system must not only deal with a spin rate of 60 Hz, but also account for the nonlinear response of the round. Both the rotational motion and the precession of the projectile served to greatly complicate how the projectile respond to control forces. Based on the analysis from the wind tunnel tests, the researchers specifically developed a sabot pusher system to launch the projectile so that the aerodynamic surface of the projectile remain smooth to allow the Coanda effect to generate the divert force.

As a result of its telemetry system, the researchers could monitor the forces on the SCORPION as it flies to its target. However, in order to control its flight path, the projectile employed MAFC through the use of tiny synthetic jets embedded on the surface of the projectile. Developed by researchers at the Georgia Institute of Technology, these synthetic jet actuators were designed to fire bursts of air to alter the flow field and pressure distributions of the surrounding air. When turned on momentarily, these synthetic jets used those tiny, short bursts to correct the trajectory of the projectile as it traveled towards its target. As active control devices with zero net mass flux, the synthetic jets produced the desired amount of control of the flow field through momentum effects. They acted as steering devices for the projectile, using a minute-vibrating diaphragm-like system powered by piezoceramic elements. Due to the tiny air vortices created by the synthetic jets, an asymmetry in the airflow could be created around the projectile. In addition, the resulting Coanda effect multiplied this effects of this phenomenon, producing air flow changes that were strong enough to change the projectile's trajectory. The SCORPION's electronics have also undergone g-hardening to withstand the heavy forces generated during each launch.

However, issues still remain with this design. The SCORPION projectile lacks sufficient payload room for a full guidance system as well as a greater explosive power. As a result, additional features proposed for the SCORPION munition included adding more space in the projectile for explosives and a system that would let the projectile detonate at a pre-set detonation point. Researchers have also investigated the use of gas-generator actuators that utilize minuscule explosive charges instead of jets of air to steer the course of the projectile.

In addition to the 40 mm SCORPION, a 25 mm SCORPION was also developed. Designed similarly to the 40 mm model, the 25 mm SCORPION munition consisted of two sections, the electronic control module and the actuator module. The electronic control module was a potted cylindrical container that houses the power, driver, IMU, processor, and connector boards as well as a removable ogive that provided the user with access to communication and data. The projectile also included the command guidance and the inertial sensor suite (ISS), the latter of which held the oscillator board, the processor board, and the sensor suite. The sensor suite contained 2-axis rate sensors, 3-axes accelerometers, two radially oriented accelerometers, and 3-axis magnetometers. The actuator module was kept separate from the rest of the assembly in order to prevent any potentially hazardous material like a propellant from seeping into the electronic control module until just prior to firing. The SCORPION's propulsion system consisted of a cartridge case that held the propellant and an obturator that sealed the high pressure combustion gasses inside. The obturator served to transmit torque for spin stabilization and distributed axial force to accelerate the projectile within the gun tube. According to flight experiments conducted at the Army Research Laboratory, the 25 mm SCORPION successfully established the charge weight needed to meet the velocity requirements when launched at 0.8 Mach.
