= Gloster Grebe =

1923 British military aircraft

Grebe
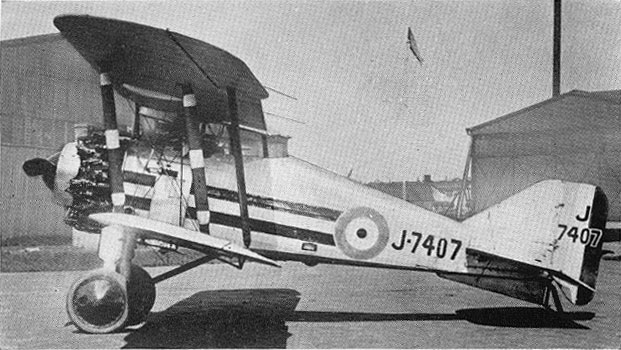
- Gloster Grebe of No. 25 Squadron RAF.

General information
- Type: Fighter
- Manufacturer: Gloster Aircraft Company
- Designer: Henry Folland
- Primary users: Royal Air Force Royal New Zealand Air Force
- Number built: 133

History
- Introduction date: 1923
- First flight: 1923
- Retired: RAF 1931, RNZAF 1938
- Developed from: Gloster Grouse
- Variant: Gloster Gamecock

The Gloster Grebe was developed by the Gloster Aircraft Company from the Gloster Grouse (an experimental aircraft later developed as a trainer), and was the Royal Air Force's first post-First World War fighter aircraft, entering service in 1923.

== Design ==
In 1923, Gloster modified a Gloster Sparrowhawk fighter trainer with new wings to test a layout proposed by chief designer Henry Folland, combining a thick, high-lift section upper wing and a thinner, medium-lift lower wing, with the intention of combining high lift for takeoff with low drag. After the Grouse demonstrated that the new layout was a success, the British Air Ministry placed an order for three prototype fighters based on the Grouse (and therefore derived ultimately from Folland's Nieuport Nighthawk fighter of 1919), but powered by a 350 horsepower (260 kW) Armstrong Siddeley Jaguar III radial engine, as the "Nighthawk (thick-winged)".

The first of the prototypes (Gloster built a fourth machine as a company-owned demonstrator), by now known as the Grebe I, flew during May 1923. The performance of these prototypes during testing at RAF Martlesham Heath was good, and the Air Ministry decided to order the type into production as the Grebe II, this having a 400 horsepower (300 kW) Jaguar IV engine.

Like the Sopwith Snipe it replaced, the Grebe was a single-seat, single-engined biplane of fabric-covered wood construction. The fuselage had ash longerons and spruce stringers joined to plywood formers, while the single-bay wings (which had a considerable overhang outboard of the struts), had fabric-covered spruce spars and ribs. Two synchronised .303 in (7.7 mm) Vickers machine guns were mounted on the fuselage top decking.

== Service history ==
Grebes entered service with the RAF during October 1923 when a flight of 111 Squadron re-equipped with the new fighter. The Grebe was popular in RAF service, being much faster than the Snipe that it replaced and also very agile. It was found that the Grebe suffered from wing flutter, owing to the large overhang outside the interplane struts, which led to all RAF aircraft being modified with additional Vee-struts supporting the outer upper wing. There were also problems with the Jaguar engine, which was heavy and unreliable, and prone to catching fire.

A total of 133 Grebes were produced, including the four prototypes, 108 Grebe II single-seat fighters and 21 two-seat dual-control trainers. Grebes were retired from the RAF in 1929, replaced in part by the Gloster Gamecock, which was a developed Grebe, (Gloster fighter design, from Nighthawk to Gloster Gladiator was evolutionary).

Two Grebes were modified for suspension beneath the R33 airship on a 'trapeze' for "parasite" trials. In 1927 Sir Henry Wigram gave money to the New Zealand Government for the purchase of an aircraft. The aircraft chosen was the Grebe over the Siskin, which was also in contention. Another two Grebes were acquired by the New Zealand Permanent Air Force, forerunner of the Royal New Zealand Air Force, entering service in March 1928 and serving for more than ten years until mid-1938. The two survivors were used as instructional airframes until destroyed in 1943–44.

== Variants ==
Gloster Grouse
Experimental aircraft.
Grebe Mk I
Single-seat fighter prototype, 4 built.
Grebe Mk II
Production single-seat fighter variant with a 400 hp Armstrong Siddeley Jaguar IV engine, oleo-type landing gear and other modifications, 129 built.
Grebe (Dual)
Following a trial modification to Grebe II J7519 a small number of the Grebe II production aircraft were completed as two-seat training aircraft in 1925.

== Operators ==
New Zealand

- New Zealand Permanent Air Force
  - Pilot Training School
- Royal New Zealand Air Force two inherited from the NZPAF in 1938

United Kingdom

- Royal Air Force
  - No. 19 Squadron RAF
  - No. 25 Squadron RAF
  - No. 29 Squadron RAF
  - No. 32 Squadron RAF
  - No. 56 Squadron RAF
  - No. 111 Squadron RAF

== Specifications (Grebe Mk.II) ==
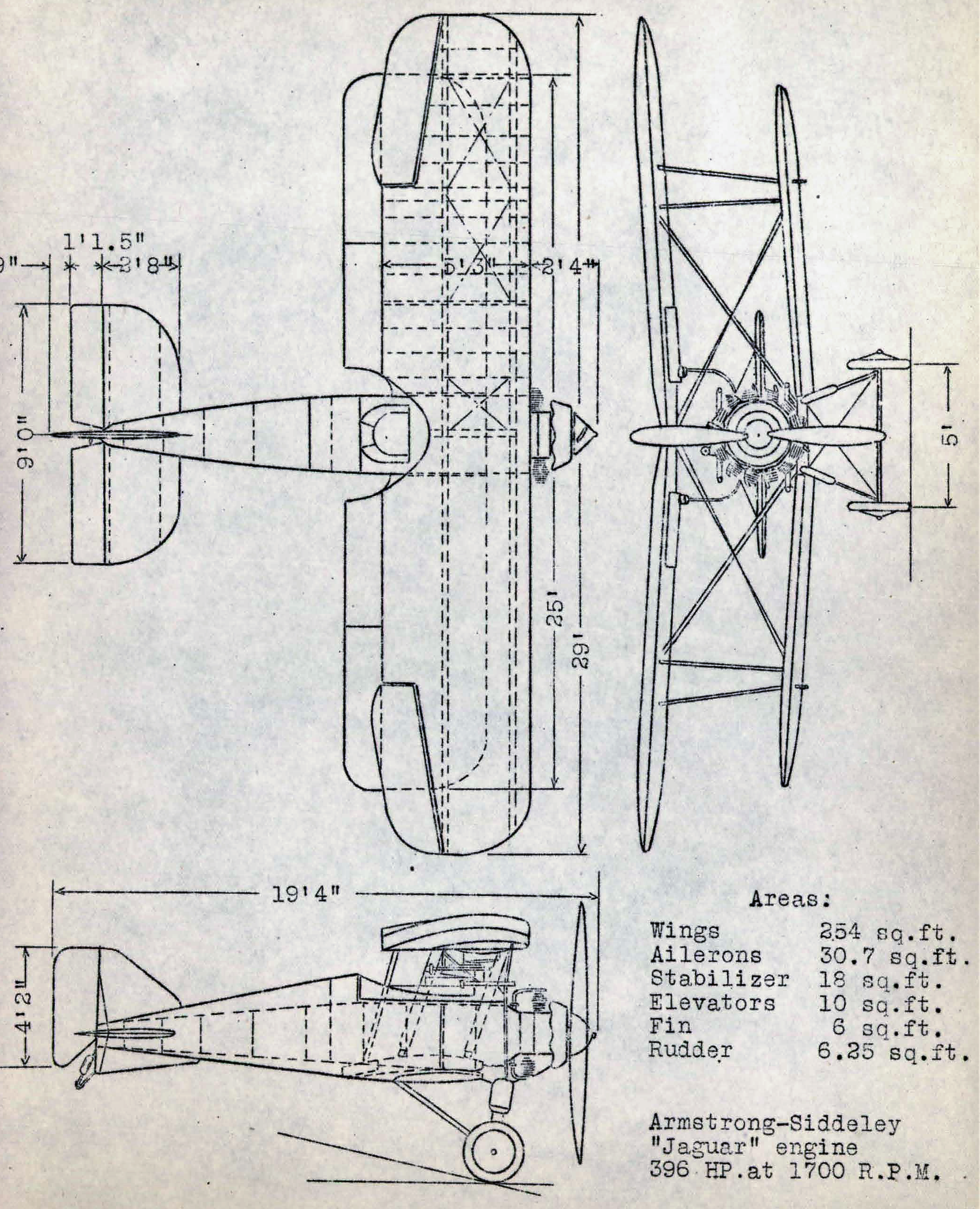
Gloster Grebe II 3 view from NACA Aircraft Circular No.7

Data from Aircraft of the Royal Air Force since 1918

General characteristics

- Crew: 1
- Length: 20 ft 3 in (6.17 m)
- Wingspan: 29 ft 4 in (8.94 m)
- Height: 9 ft 3 in (2.82 m)
- Wing area: 254 sq ft (23.6 m^{2})
- Empty weight: 1,720 lb (780 kg)
- Gross weight: 2,614 lb (1,186 kg)
- Powerplant: 1 × Armstrong Siddeley Jaguar IV 14-cylinder air-cooled radial piston engine, 400 hp (300 kW)
- Propellers: 2-bladed wooden fixed-pitch propeller

Performance

- Maximum speed: 152 mph (245 km/h, 132 kn) at sea level

145 mph (233 km/h) at 10,000 ft (3,000 m)

- Endurance: 2 hours 45 minutes
- Service ceiling: 23,000 ft (7,000 m)
- Time to altitude: 20,000 ft (6,100 m) in 23 minutes
- Wing loading: 10.3 lb/sq ft (50 kg/m^{2})
- Power/mass: 0.15 hp/lb (0.25 kW/kg)

Armament

- Guns: 2 × 0.303 in (7.7 mm) Vickers machine guns

== See also ==
- Parasite aircraft

Related development

- Gloster Grouse
- Gloster Gamecock

Related lists

- List of aircraft of the Royal Air Force
- List of fighter aircraft

== Bibliography ==
- Goulding, James (1986). Interceptor: RAF Single-Seat Multi-Gun Fighters. London: Ian Allan. ISBN 0-7110-1583-X..
- Green, William; Swanborough, Gordon (April–July 1983). "The Era-Ending Gamecock". Air Enthusiast. No. 21. ISSN 0143-5450.
- James, Derek N. (1971). Gloster Aircraft since 1917. London: Putnam. ISBN 0-370-00084-6.
- Lumsden, Alec; Thetford, Owen (1993). On Silver Wings: RAF Biplane Fighters Between the Wars. London: Osprey Aerospace. ISBN 1-85532-374-5.
- Mason, Francis K. (1992). The British Fighter since 1912. Annapolis, Maryland: Naval Institute Press. ISBN 1-55750-082-7.
- Thetford, Owen G. (1977). Aircraft of the Royal Air Force since 1918 (6th ed.). London: Putnam. ISBN 978-0-370-10056-2.
- Thetford, Owen (January 1991). "On Silver Wings — Part 4". Aeroplane Monthly. Vol. 19, no. 1. pp. 10–16. ISSN 0143-7240.
