= Gloster Nightjar =

1921 carrier-based fighter aircraft

Nightjar
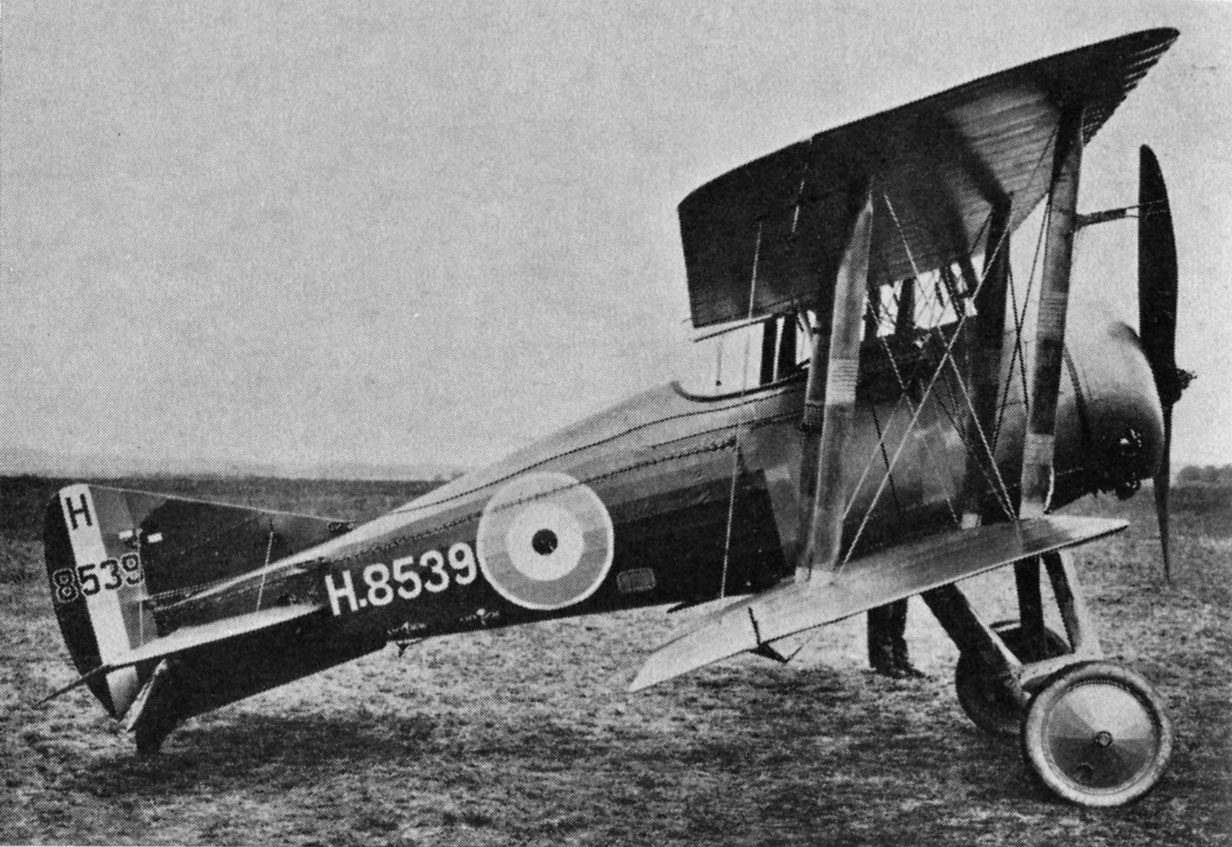

General information
- Type: Fighter
- Manufacturer: Gloster Aircraft Company
- Designer: Henry Folland
- Primary user: Royal Air Force
- Number built: 22

History
- Introduction date: 1922
- First flight: 1921
- Retired: 1924
- Developed from: Nieuport Nighthawk

The Nightjar was a British carrier-based fighter aircraft of the early 1920s. It was a modification of the earlier Nieuport Nighthawk fighter produced by Gloster after the Nieuport & General company, which designed the Nighthawk, closed down. Twenty-two were converted, serving with the British Royal Air Force from 1922 to 1924.

== Design and development ==
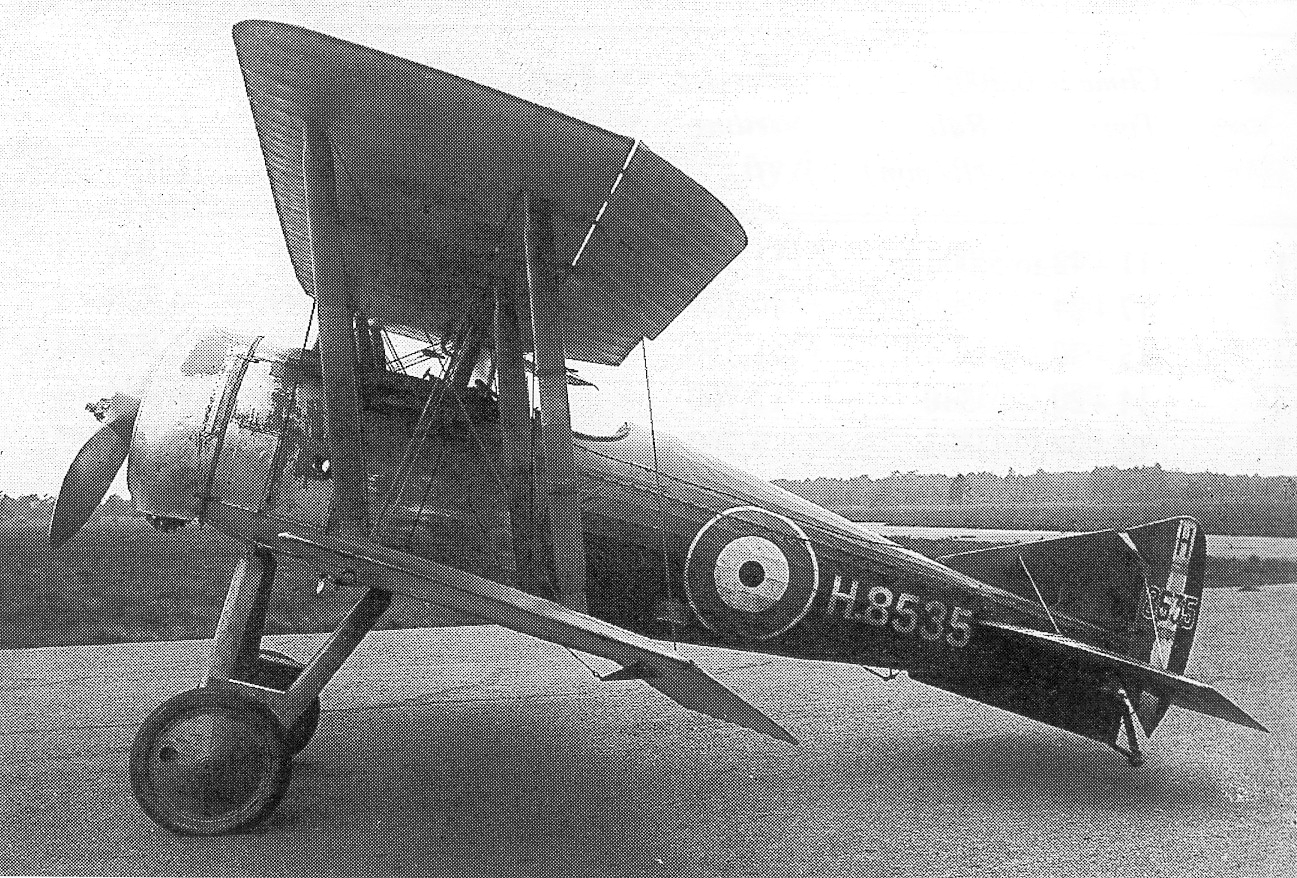
The prototype Nightjar

The Nieuport & General Aircraft Co Ltd was formed before the start of the First World War to license-produce French Nieuport aircraft. During 1917, after hiring Henry Folland as chief designer, the company started to design its own aircraft, with the first type, the Nieuport B.N.1 fighter flying early in 1918.

Folland designed the Nieuport Nighthawk fighter to meet the requirements of RAF Specification Type 1 which specified using the ABC Dragonfly radial engine, first flying in April 1919. During initial evaluation, this showed excellent performance, and was ordered into production. The Dragonfly engine, however, proved hopelessly unreliable, and none of the Dragonfly-powered Nighthawks that were completed entered service.

Nieuport & General closed down in August 1920, and the rights to the Nighthawk were purchased by the Gloster Aircraft Company, who hired Folland as chief designer. Gloster proceeded to produce a number of derivatives of the Nighthawk, calling them Gloster Mars, with variants being sold to Japan (Gloster Sparrowhawk) and Greece, and being evaluated by the RAF.

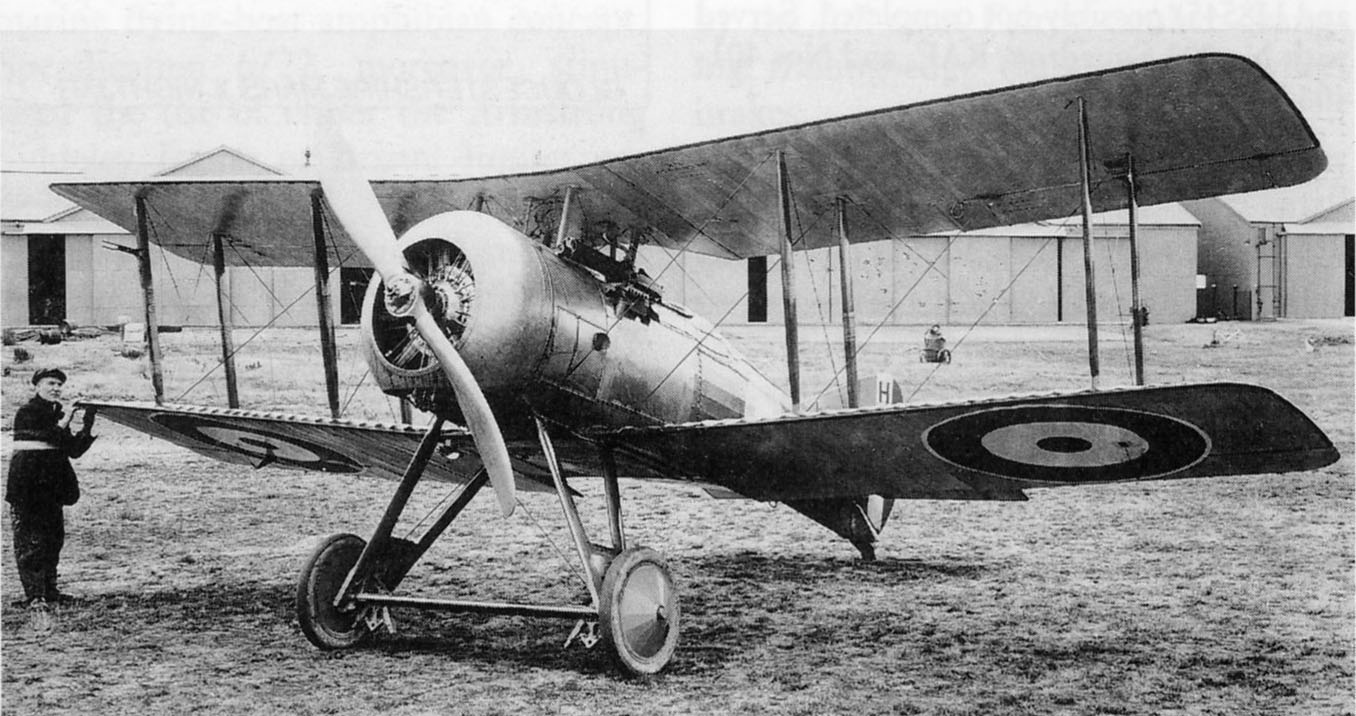
Nightjar during evaluation at Farnborough in 1922 - Note arrestor jaws on undercarriage

The final derivative of the Nighthawk was the Gloster Mars X, also known as the Nightjar. This was intended as a single-seat shipboard fighter to replace Sopwith Camels aboard the Royal Navy's aircraft carriers. It was a simple conversion of surplus Nighthawks, with the Bentley BR2 rotary engine (which was readily available from surplus stocks) replacing the Dragonfly. The Nightjar was a two-bay biplane of wooden construction, and was fitted with a new, wide-track undercarriage, with jaws fitted to act as arresting gear for use with the fore and aft arrestor cables then in use on British aircraft carriers.

The first Nightjar was delivered for evaluation by the Aeroplane and Armament Experimental Establishment in May 1921. A total of 22 Nighthawks were converted to Nightjars in 1922.

== Operational history ==
The Nightjar entered service with 203 Squadron at RAF Leuchars in June 1922. Six Nightjars of 203 Squadron were deployed aboard HMS Argus in September 1922, when Argus sailed for the Dardanelles during the Chanak Crisis.

The Nightjar continued to serve with fighter flights aboard Royal Navy aircraft carriers until replaced by the Fairey Flycatcher in 1924.

== Operators ==
United Kingdom

- Royal Air Force
  - No. 203 Squadron RAF
- Royal Navy

== Specifications (Nightjar) ==
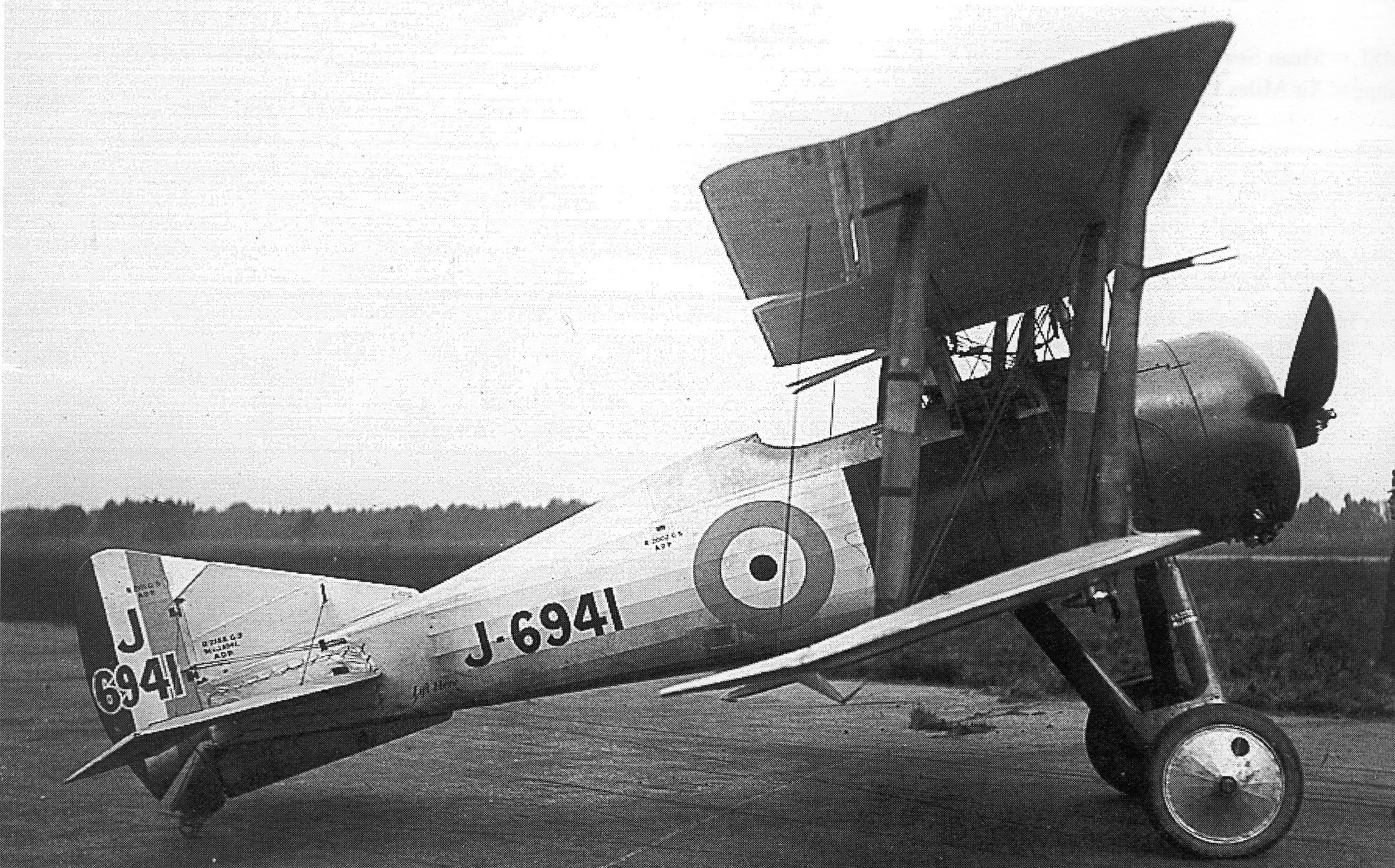
Production Nightjar without armament

Data from British Naval Aircraft since 1912

General characteristics

- Crew: 1
- Length: 19 ft 2 in (5.84 m)
- Wingspan: 28 ft 0 in (8.53 m)
- Height: 9 ft 7 in (2.92 m)
- Wing area: 270 sq ft (25 m^{2})
- Empty weight: 1,765 lb (801 kg)
- Gross weight: 2,165 lb (982 kg)
- Powerplant: 1 × Bentley BR2 9-cylinder air-cooled rotary piston engine, 230 hp (170 kW)
- Propellers: 2-bladed fixed-pitch propeller

Performance

- Maximum speed: 120 mph (190 km/h, 100 kn) at sea level
- Endurance: 2 hours
- Service ceiling: 19,000 ft (5,800 m)
- Time to altitude: 15,000 ft (4,600 m) in 20 minutes
- Wing loading: 8.01 lb/sq ft (39.1 kg/m^{2})
- Power/mass: 0.11 hp/lb (0.18 kW/kg)

Armament

- Guns: 2 × fixed forward firing .303 in (7.70 mm) Vickers machine guns.

== See also ==
Related development

- Nieuport Nighthawk
- Gloster Sparrowhawk

Aircraft of comparable role, configuration, and era

- Fairey Flycatcher
