= Gloster Aircraft Company =

English aircraft manufacturer (1917–1963)

Gloster Aircraft Company Limited
- Industry: Aviation
- Founded: 1917; 109 years ago (as Gloucestershire Aircraft Company)
- Defunct: 1963; 63 years ago
- Fate: Merged with Armstrong Whitworth (1961) and Avro (1963)
- Successor: Hawker Siddeley Aviation
- Headquarters: Hucclecote, Gloucestershire, United Kingdom
- Key people: George Carter
- Parent: Hawker Aircraft (1934)

The Gloster Aircraft Company was a British aircraft manufacturer from 1917 to 1963.

Founded as the Gloucestershire Aircraft Company Limited during the First World War, with the aircraft construction activities of H.H. Martyn & Co. of Cheltenham, England, it produced fighters during the war. It was renamed later as foreigners found 'Gloucestershire' difficult to pronounce. It later became part of the Hawker Siddeley group and the Gloster name disappeared in 1963.

Gloster designed and built several fighters that equipped the British Royal Air Force (RAF) during the interwar years, including the Gladiator, the RAF's last biplane fighter. The company built most of the wartime production of Hawker Hurricanes and Hawker Typhoons for their parent company, Hawker Siddeley, while its design office was working on the first British jet aircraft, the E.28/39 experimental aircraft. This was followed by the Meteor, the RAF's first jet-powered fighter and the only Allied jet fighter to be put into service during the Second World War.

== History ==
=== 1917 – Formation ===
In 1917, during the midst of the First World War, the Gloster Aircraft Company Limited was formed under the name The Gloucestershire Aircraft Company Limited. At the time of its creation, its owners were Hugh Burroughes (1884–1985) and H H Martyn & Co. Limited, who held a 50 per cent share between them; the aircraft manufacturer Airco held the other 50 per cent. On the company's board were A W Martyn, Burroughes, and George Holt Thomas of Airco. The firm quickly acquired the aircraft component construction activities that were previously being carried out by H H Martyn & Co. for the war effort in order to perform subcontracted work from Airco; the provision of additional production capacity had been a major motivating factor for Airco's involvement in founding the company. H H Martyn were architectural engineers and had produced items such as propellers before moving to whole fuselages for Airco. (Note: Until 1914 a firm of specialist woodworkers. page 108, Michael Stratton, Barrie Stuart Trinder, Twentieth Century Industrial ArchaeologyObituary, Mr Hugh Burroughes. The Times, Thursday, 31 October 1985; p. 16; Issue 62283. H. H. Martyn & Co., founded by Martyn in 1888, as monumental masons working in stone, marble and wood had extended to joinery, wrought iron work and castings and by 1914 included pressed steel. Their 5 acres of workshops outfitted ships such as the SS Queen Elizabeth. Gloucestershire archives, Records of and relating to H H Martyn & Co Ltd.)

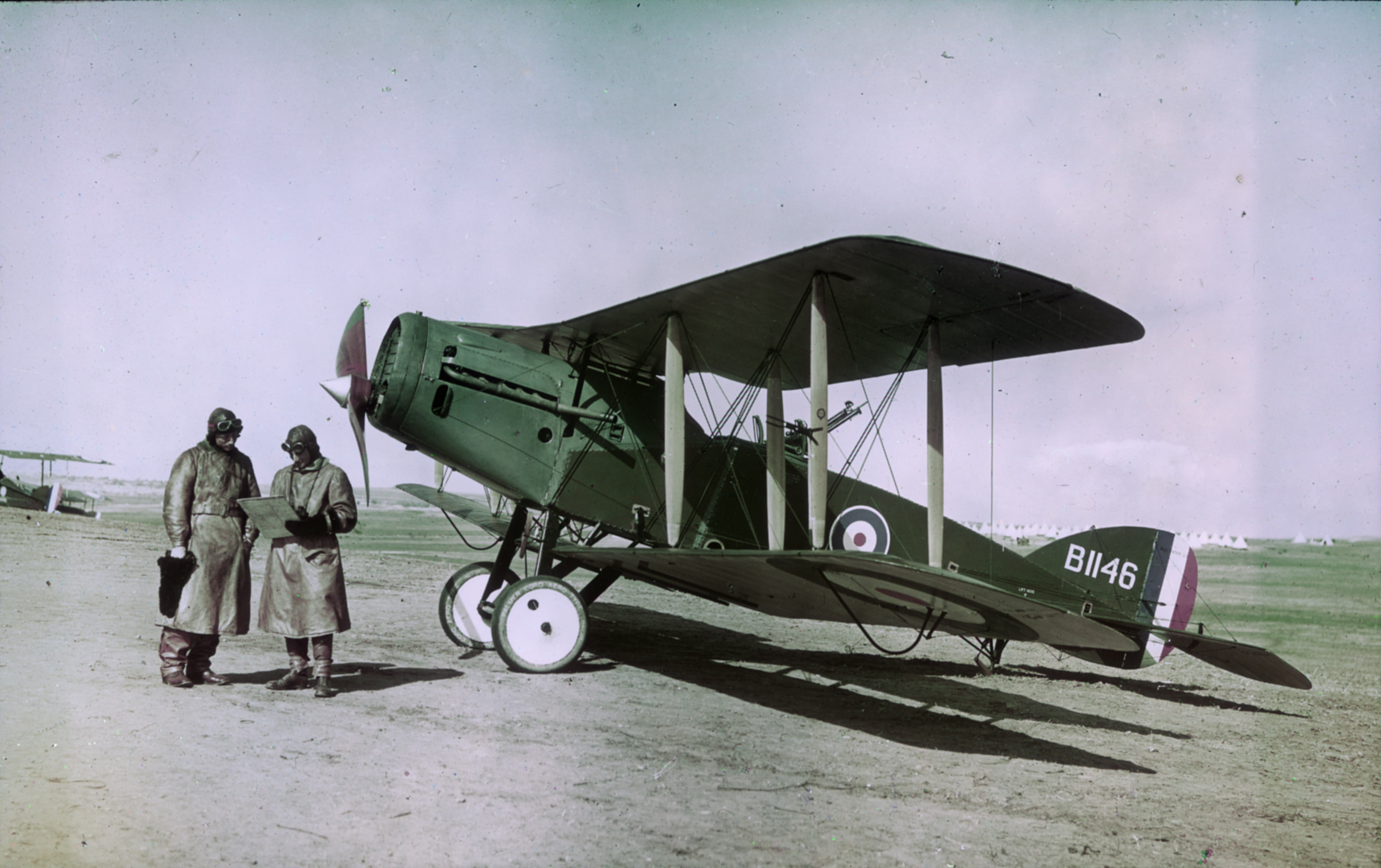
A Bristol F.2B Fighter of No. 1 Squadron, Australian Flying Corps flown by Ross Smith in Palestine, February 1918.

The firm rented facilities at Sunningend in Cheltenham, Gloucestershire to serve as their works. By the spring of 1918, the company was producing 45 new Bristol Fighter aircraft per week.

As the orders for aircraft increased, other companies in the Gloucester and Cheltenham district were contracted with work. Where any flying was involved, the aircraft would be transported (with wings detached) to a newly formed Air Board aircraft acceptance park at Brockworth, seven miles (11 km) away by motor transport. Although Brockworth Aerodrome was used by the company, it lacked any hangars until 1921, after which it would rent a portion of one hangar from the Air Board. Gradually, Gloucester would relocate its operational base to the Brockworth site.

=== 1919 – Interwar period ===
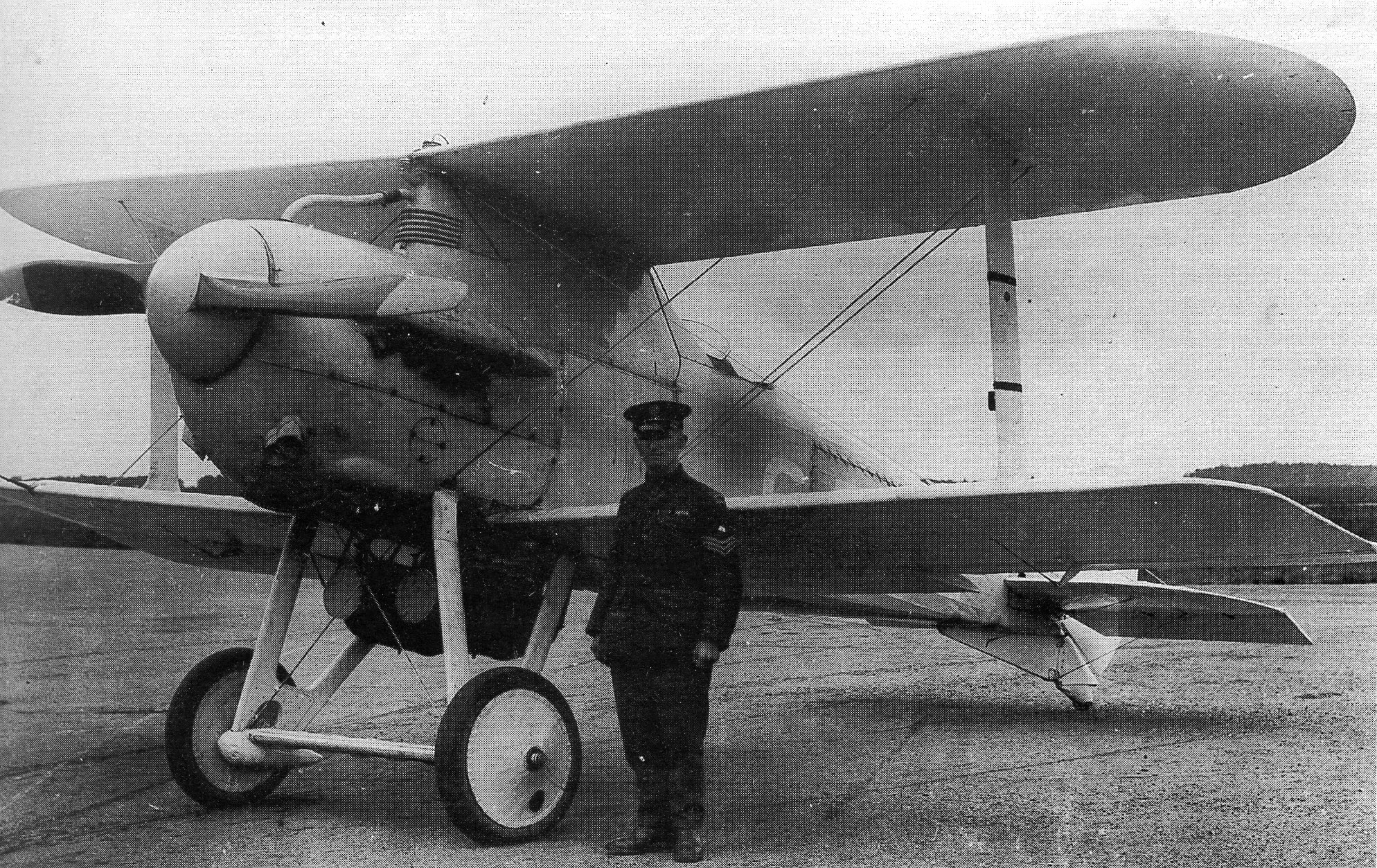
The Gloster Mars, a derivative of the Nieuport Nighthawk

Following the Armistice of 11 November 1918 and the end of the First World War, the company suffered financial losses from the collapse of Airco, only receiving partial compensation for the cancellation of outstanding production orders. In 1920, following the closure of rival British aircraft manufacturer Nieuport & General, the services of its former chief designer, Henry Folland (1889–1954), were hired by the company; it also acquired the rights for the Nieuport Nighthawk fighter and various unassembled aircraft components.

In December 1926, it was decided that the name of the company should be switched to a simplified form—the Gloster Aircraft Company. This was reported because customers outside of the United Kingdom found it easier to pronounce and to spell. Typically, locals and employees simply referred to the company as GAC.

With the move to metal construction, the Sunningend factory was soon deemed to be no longer suitable; accordingly, in 1928, Gloster purchased the aerodrome at Brockworth, including all of the adjacent hangars and neighbouring office accommodation.

In 1934, Gloster was acquired by another British aircraft manufacturer, Hawker Aircraft. Regardless of this change in ownership, the company continued to produce aircraft under its own brand name. In that same year, Gloster produced one of its most famous aircraft, the Gladiator biplane. The 1935 merger of Hawker Aircraft and the interests of J. D. Siddeley (Armstrong Siddeley and Armstrong Whitworth Aircraft) saw Gloster become a part of Hawker Siddeley Aircraft, Ltd.

=== 1939 – Second World War ===
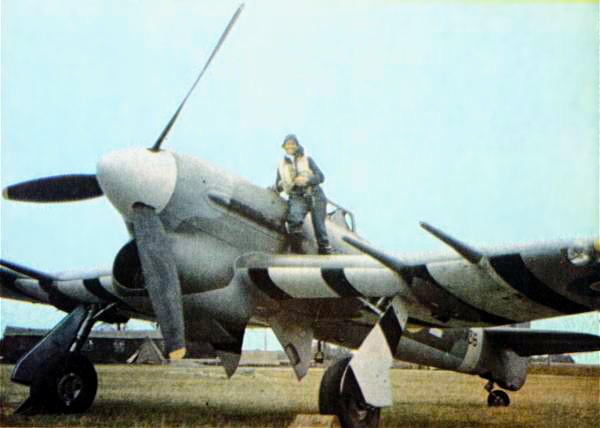
Hawker Typhoon during wartime, with black and white identification stripes under the wings

At the outbreak of the Second World War, the firm lacked any modern designs of its own in production, but had significant expertise and production facilities available. Thus, Gloster undertook manufacture for Hawker-designed aircraft to equip the RAF on behalf of its parent company. During 1939, the company constructed 1,000 Hawker Hurricanes within the first 12 months of the conflict; Gloster delivered the last of its 2,750 Hurricanes in 1942. After ending production of the Hurricane, it was decided to manufacture the newer Hawker Typhoon in its place. Gloster proceeded to construct 3,300 in total, almost the entirety of the type.

=== 1941 – Arrival of the turbojet ===
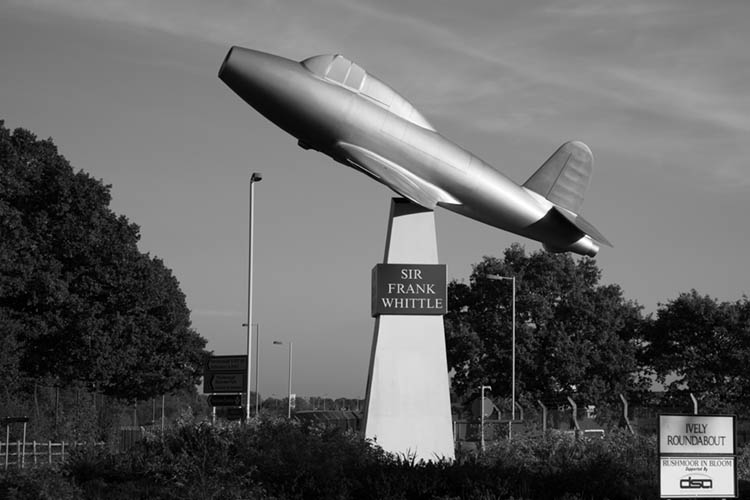
Frank Whittle's memorial showing a full-scale model of the Gloster E28/39

Frank Whittle had first met Gloster's designer and test pilots in April 1939 and an official approach from the Air Ministry followed. As no existing aircraft was suitable for adaptation to take the new jet engine, and Gloster did not have much workload in its design department, Gloster received a contract in early 1940 – to design and build Britain's first jet aircraft. Two airframes were built in secrecy. Due to the risk of bombing, one of the aircraft was built offsite from Brockworth at Regent Motors Cheltenham.

On 15 May 1941, the first official test flight of the Gloster E.28/39 W 4041/G with a turbo-jet engine, invented by Sir Frank Whittle took off from RAF Cranwell (earlier taxying trials, in which the E.28/39 briefly became airborne, and therefore "flew", were carried out at the company's airfield at Brockworth).

Although the E.28.39 could in theory be used as a fighter, a specific fighter design was required and Gloster began work on a twin engine jet design. Once the E.28/39 had flown, the Air Staff told Gloster to stop work on their F.18/40 nightfighter (other aircraft could be adapted to replace it) to concentrate on the jet fighter. The jet design became the Gloster Meteor, the only jet to be used in combat by the Allied Forces during the Second World War.

First flying with the RAF in 1943, the Meteor commenced operations in mid-1944, only some weeks later than the world's first operational jet, the German Messerschmitt Me 262. Crucially, it became the first RAF aircraft with a high enough top speed to enable it to fly alongside V1 flying bombs and tip them under the wing so as to render the V1's gyro incapable of recovery. This made the V1s crash prematurely to earth in open countryside before they could reach London.

=== 1945 – Setting world airspeed records ===
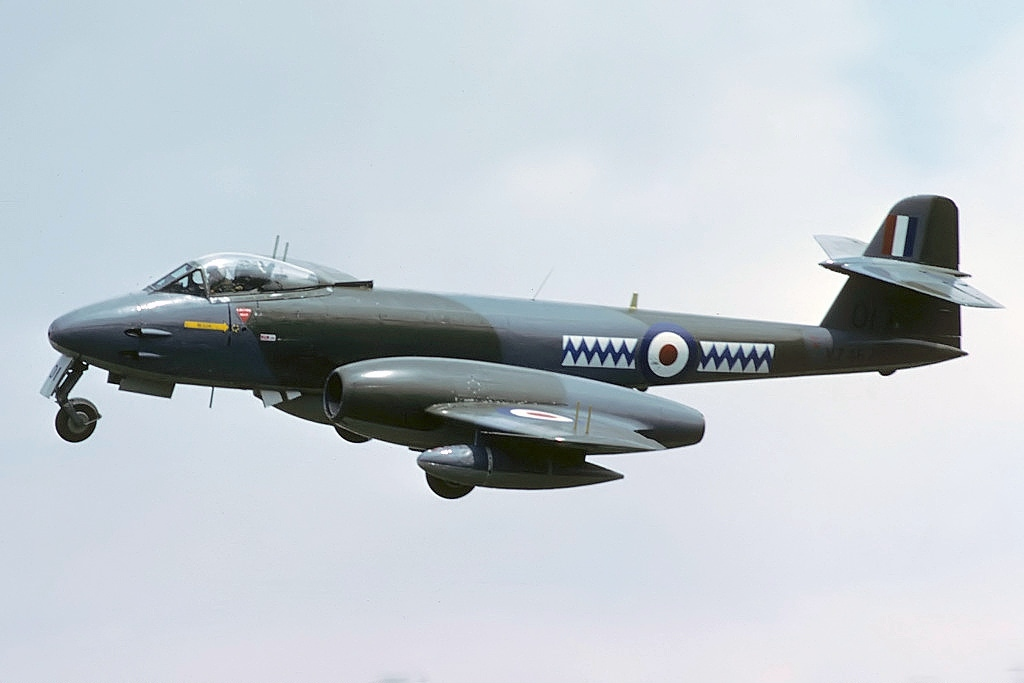
Meteor F.8 in flight at RAF Greenham Common, May 1986

In 1945, a Meteor F Mk.4 prototype, stripped of armament, achieved a World Airspeed Record of 606 mph (975 km/h) with Group Captain H. Wilson at the controls. During early 1946, another F Mk.4 prototype was used to set a world air speed record of 616 mph (991 km/h) true airspeed with Group Captain "Teddy" Donaldson flying the highly modified Meteor, nicknamed "Yellow Peril." The second pilot in the High Speed Flight, Bill Waterton achieved 614 mph. During the record attempt Donaldson became the first man to break the 1,000 km/h barrier, winning the Britannia Trophy and a Bar to his AFC. Meteors remained in service with several air forces for many years and saw action in the Korean War with the Royal Australian Air Force (RAAF). Eventually, Gloster Meteors in fighter, trainer and night fighter versions were in operational use by 12 nations.

=== 1947 – Gloster's heyday ===
During Gloster's heyday, in 1947, S/L Janusz Zurakowski was employed as an experimental pilot. In the following years, he became one of the world's most famous experimental and aerobatics pilots. He developed a new aerobatic manoeuvre, the "Zurabatic Cartwheel", which held the audience captivated as he suspended the Gloster Meteor G-7-1 prototype he was flying, in a vertical cartwheel at the 1951 Farnborough Air Show, a manoeuvre the announcer declared to be "Impossible!" Serving for a brief period as the chief test pilot, he tested the many experimental versions of the Gloster Meteor, Javelin and E.1/44 fighters. During the Gloster years, "Zura" as he came to be known, set an international speed record: London-Copenhagen-London, 4–5 April 1950 at Gloster's instruction to sell the aircraft to the Danish Air Force.

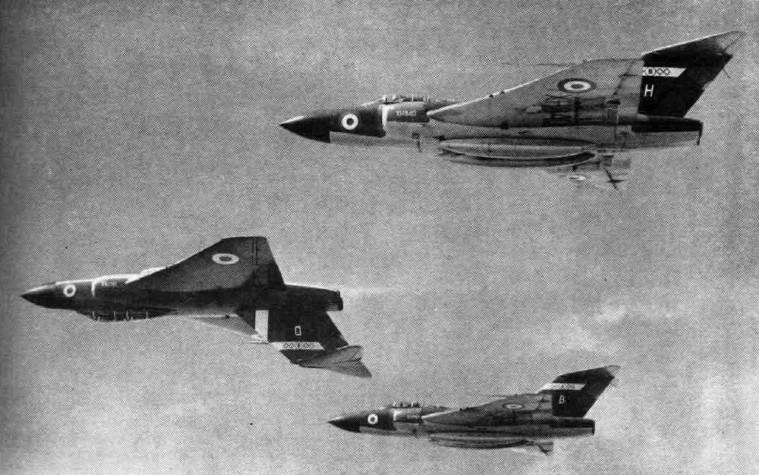
Javelin FAW 7s of No. 64 Squadron RAF in 1959.

In 1952, the two-seat, delta winged Gloster Javelin was developed as an all-weather fighter that could fly above 50,000 feet (15,000 m) at almost the speed of sound. This modern aircraft proved to be too heavy to take off from the short airfield in Brockworth, and was instead fitted out to the bare minimum and given a very small fuel load. It was then flown in a short hop to RAF Moreton Valence seven miles (11 km) to the south west, where the aircraft would be completed. It was this shortcoming of facilities, along with the rationalisation of the British aircraft industry, that would lead to the demise of Gloster.

One blind alley was the work done (along with eight other British companies) on designing an aircraft to the same exacting Ministry specification that spawned the BAC TSR-2. The contract was issued to BAC but the Wilson Government cancelled the TSR2 project.

=== 1960s – Demise ===
In 1961, the company was merged with Armstrong Whitworth Aircraft Limited to form Whitworth Gloster Aircraft Limited. Following another re-organisation, the firm became part of the Avro Whitworth Division of Hawker Siddeley Aviation in 1963, and the name Gloster disappeared as Hawker Siddeley rebranded its product line under its own name. In the late 1960s/early 1970s, the Saunders-Roe Folly Works, by then owned by Hawker Siddeley, was merged with the Gloster works to form Gloster-Saro utilising both companies' expertise in aluminium forming to produce fire appliances and tankers in the Gloster factory at Hucclecote, mostly based on Reynolds-Boughton chassis. In 1984, Gloster Saro acquired the fire tender business of the Chubb group with the company merging in 1987 with Simon Engineering to form Simon Gloster Saro. The company eventually was used to manufacture both alloy and, later, fibreglass fuel tankers for Companies such as Shell/BP.

The site at Brockworth was sold in 1964. In recent years, the runway and old buildings have been demolished and replaced by standard modern industrial estate and office buildings.

== Products ==
- 1921 Gloster Mars – single-seat racing biplane later modified as the Gloster I
- 1921 Gloster Sparrowhawk
- 1922 Gloster Mars VI Nighthawk
- 1922 Gloster Mars X Nightjar
- 1923 Gloster Gannet – single-seat ultra light biplane
- 1923 Gloster Grebe – single-seat day fighter biplane
- 1923 Gloster Grouse
- 1924 Gloster Gorcock – experimental single-seat fighter biplane
- 1924 Gloster II – single-seat racing biplane
- 1925 Gloster III – single-seat racing float biplane
- 1925 Gloster Gamecock – single-seat day and night interceptor biplane
- 1925 Gloster Guan – experimental single-seat high altitude fighter biplane
- 1926 Gloster Goral – two-seat general purpose biplane
- 1926 Gloster Goring – two-seat day bomber/torpedo biplane
- 1927 Gloster IV – single-seat racing float biplane
- 1927 Gloster Goldfinch – single-seat high-altitude day and night fighter biplane
- 1927 Gloster Gambet – single-seat deck landing fighter biplane
- 1928 Gloster Gnatsnapper – single-seat deck landing fighter biplane
- 1929 Gloster VI – single-seat racing monoplane (world absolute speed record holder for a few hours in 1929)
- 1929 A.S.31 Survey – two-seat photographic survey biplane
- 1932 Gloster TC.33 – four-engined bomber/transport biplane
- 1932 Gloster TSR.38 – three-seat torpedo/spotter/reconnaissance biplane
- 1934 Gloster Gauntlet – single-seat day and night fighter biplane
- 1934 Gloster Gladiator – single-seat day fighter biplane
- 1937 Gloster F.5/34 single-seat day fighter monoplane prototype
- 1939 Gloster F.9/37 twin-engined heavy fighter prototype
- 1941 Gloster E.28/39 first British jet-engined aircraft
- 1944 Gloster Meteor single-seat day fighter – only allied jet aircraft to see action during the Second World War
- 1948 Gloster E.1/44 single-seat jet day fighter prototype
- 1954 Gloster Javelin two-seat all-weather jet fighter
- 1954 Gloster Meteor F8 "Prone Pilot" experimental conversion of Meteor

== Chief Test Pilots ==
- 1927–1935 Howard Saint
- 1935–1942 Gerry Sayer
- 1942–1944 Michael Daunt
- 1945–1946 Eric Greenwood
- 1947–1954 William Arthur Waterton
- 1953–1960 Richard Frewen Martin
- 1960–1961 Geoffrey Worrall

== See also ==
- Aerospace industry in the United Kingdom
