= Gloster Grouse =

British biplane of the 1920s

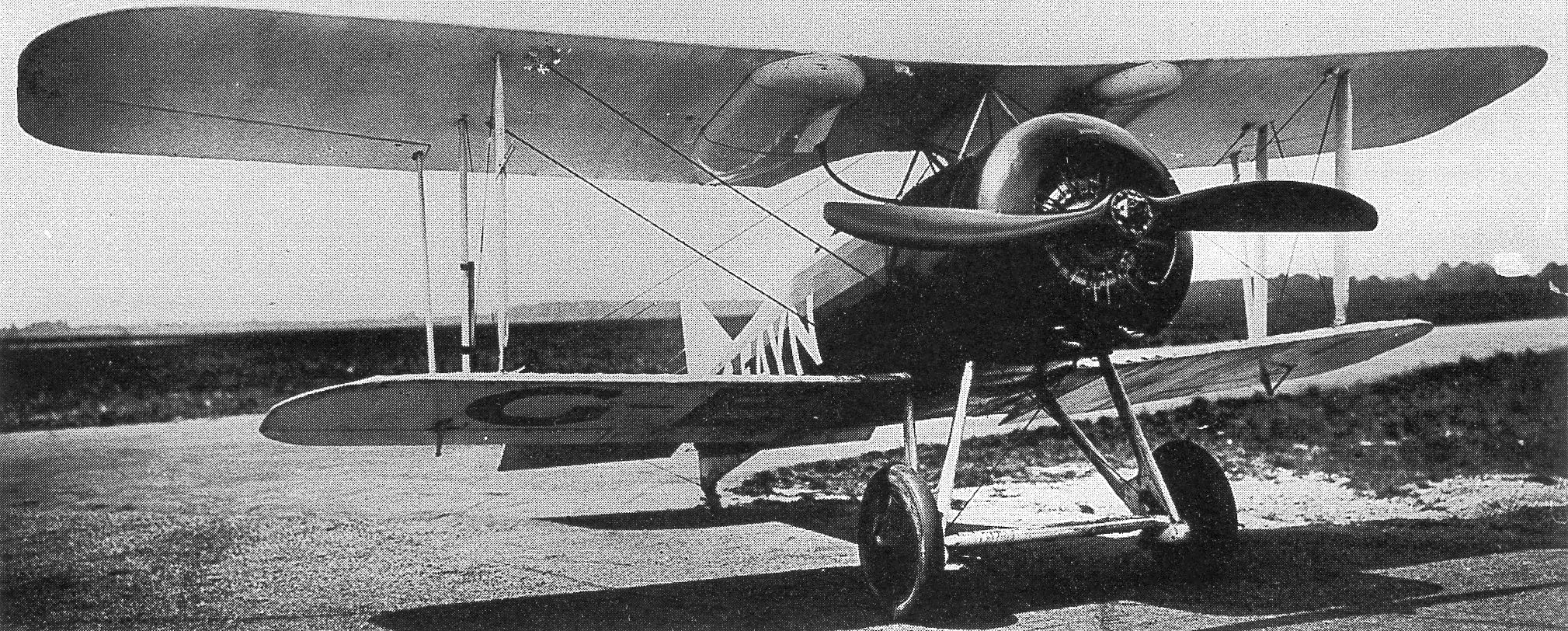

General information
- Type: Experimental Aircraft, Fighter
- Manufacturer: Gloster Aircraft Company
- Designer: H.P.Folland
- Status: retired
- Primary user: Swedish Air Force
- Number built: 1

History
- Introduction date: 1924
- First flight: 1923
- Developed from: Gloster Sparrowhawk
- Variant: Gloster Grebe

The Gloster Grouse was a British biplane of the 1920s developed by the Gloster Aircraft Company. Often referred to as the prototype to the Gloster Grebe, the Grouse originally built as an experimental aircraft and then later developed as a trainer. Despite its compact design and maneuverability, the Grouse was not in itself a commercial success, although it formed the basis for the Gloster Grebe and Gamecock fighters which were used by Britain's Royal Air Force into the 1930s.

== Design and development ==
The design of the Gloster Grouse was an experiment to combine the advantages of the monoplane with those of a biplane. It was designed by English aviation engineer and aircraft designer Henry Folland, the designer of the S.E.5 among other aircraft. The top wing had a thick, high lift aerofoil, while the bottom wing was smaller, with a thinner medium lift aerofoil set at a smaller angle of attack than the upper wing. This arrangement was meant to produce high lift for take-off with low drag.

To test this arrangement, new wings were fitted to a modified Gloster Sparrowhawk fuselage to produce the Gloster Grouse. The resulting aircraft was a small biplane with single bay wooden wings. The fuselage was rather short, and while the aircraft used the fuselage of a two-seat Sparrowhawk II, the forward cockpit was faired over, leaving a single seat for the pilot in an open cockpit. The Grouse retained the Bentley BR2 rotary engine of the Sparrowhawk driving a two blade propeller.

The prototype Grouse Mk I (registration G-EAYN) first flew in 1923, proving during testing that Folland's theories were correct. After evaluation by the RAF, orders were placed for three fighter derivatives, to be powered by Armstrong Siddeley Jaguar radial engines, designated Gloster Grebe.

In 1924, Gloster rebuilt the Grouse into a two-seat basic trainer, the Grouse II, powered by an Armstrong Siddeley Lynx radial to replace the RAFs aging Avro 504s, emerging in this form in 1925.

== Operational history ==
The Grouse II was unsuccessful in meeting the RAF's needs, a new version of the Avro 504, the 504N, also powered by the Lynx engine, being preferred. The Swedish Army Aviation Company purchased the Grouse II prototype as an advanced trainer. The aircraft was delivered just a short time before the Swedish Air Force was founded in the summer of 1926. During its time in Sweden, it only flew 109 hours. The pilots were impressed with the good performance of the aircraft, but no more Gloster Grouses were provided to the Air Force.

== Operators ==
Sweden

- Royal Swedish Air Force

== Specifications (Grouse II) ==
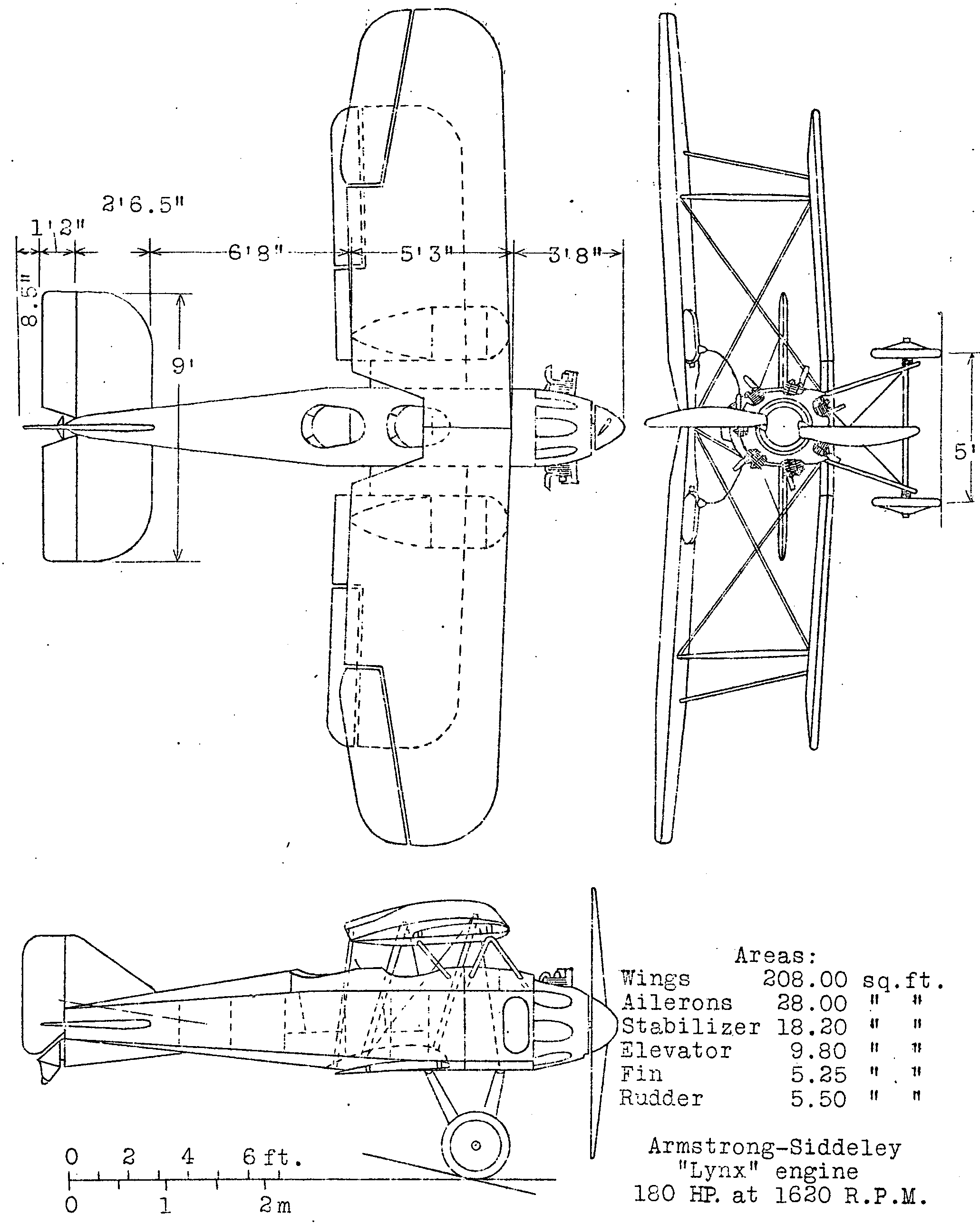
Gloster Grouse II 3 view from NACA Aircraft Circular No.7

Data from Gloster Aircraft since 1917

General characteristics

- Crew: 2
- Length: 20 ft 4 in (6.20 m)
- Wingspan: 27 ft 10 in (8.48 m)
- Height: 9 ft 5 in (2.87 m)
- Wing area: 205 sq ft (19.0 m^{2})
- Empty weight: 1,395 lb (633 kg)
- Gross weight: 2,118 lb (961 kg)
- Powerplant: 1 × Armstrong Siddeley Lynx 7-cylinder air-cooled radial piston engine, 185 hp (138 kW)
- Propellers: 2-bladed fixed-pitch propeller

Performance

- Maximum speed: 120 mph (190 km/h, 100 kn)
- Endurance: 3 hours 45 minutes
- Service ceiling: 18,000 ft (5,500 m)
- Time to altitude: 10,000 ft (3,000 m) in 17 minutes

== See also ==
Related development

- Gloster Sparrowhawk
- Gloster Grebe
- Gloster Gamecock

Aircraft of comparable role, configuration, and era

- Avro 504
