= Obturator ring =

Part of aero engines

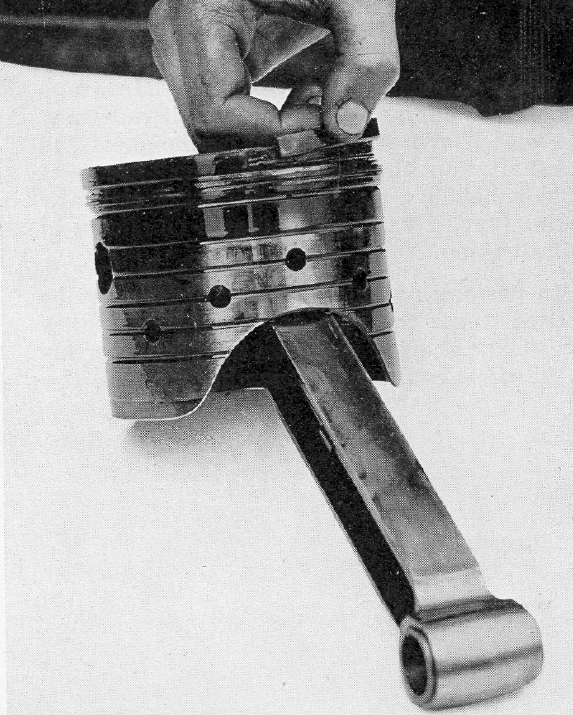
Obturator ring being removed from a 100 hp Gnome Monosoupape rotary engine

An obturator ring was a type of piston ring used in the early rotary engines of some World War I fighter aircraft for improved sealing in the presence of cylinder distortion.

== Purpose ==
The cylinders of rotary aircraft engines (engines with the crankshaft fixed to the airframe and rotating cylinders) suffered from uneven cylinder cooling as the side facing the direction of rotation received more cooling air which led to thermal distortion. To keep weight down the cylinders on rotary engines had very thin-walls (1.5 mm) and some had no cylinder liners. On engine types without cylinder liners, obturator rings, made of bronze in the early Gnome engines, were fitted as these were soft enough to not damage cylinder walls and could flex to the shape of the cylinder.

In operation wear on the rings was considerable. Engines needed to be overhauled about every 20 hours. The reliability of Gnome engines license-built by The British Gnome and Le Rhone Engine Co. was improved with an overhaul life of about 80 hours being achieved, mainly as a result of using a special tool to roll the 'L' section obturator rings. Clerget rotary aircraft engines also used obturator rings which were prone to overheating and seizure.

Le Rhône and Bentley BR1/BR2 rotary engines used cylinder liners and were sealed using conventional piston rings rather than obturator rings.

== See also ==
- Cannelure
- Gas check
