= Richard Frewen Martin =

British test pilot (1918–2006)

- Born: 26 July 1918; Bournemouth, England
- Died: 1 September 2006 (aged 88); Gloucester, England
- Military career
- Allegiance: United Kingdom
- Branch: Royal Air Force
- Service years: 1939-1954
- Rank: Wing commander
- Service number: 33439
- Conflicts: Second World War
- Awards: Officer of the Order of the British Empire; Distinguished Flying Cross; Air Force Cross; Queen's Commendation for Valuable Service in the Air
- Other work: Test pilot

Richard Frewen Martin, OBE DFC & Bar AFC (26 July 1918 – 1 September 2006) was a British test pilot.

== Life ==
"Dickie" Martin was born in Bournemouth on 26 July 1918. He served in the Royal Air Force during the Second World War and won a Distinguished Flying Cross and bar. After the war, he tested the early experimental jets that led to the development of the Hunter, Swift and Sea Vixen fighter aircraft.

He left the RAF in 1953 with the rank of Wing Commander to become a test pilot at Gloster Aircraft Company, where he was appointed chief test pilot the following year and led development of the delta-wing Javelin fighter. He amassed 19,000 flying hours, and flew 240 different types of aircraft.

== Honours and awards ==
- 5 November 1940 – Flying Officer Richard Frewen Martin (33439) of No. 73 Squadron RAF is awarded the Distinguished Flying Cross (DFC).
- 22 August 1941 – Acting Flight Lieutenant Richard Frewen Martin, DFC, (33439) of No. 250 Squadron RAF is awarded a bar to the Distinguished Flying Cross.
- 1 January 1949 – Squadron Leader Richard Frewen Martin, DFC, (33439) RAF is awarded the Air Force Cross.
- 1 January 1963 – Wing Commander Richard Frewen Martin, DFC, AFC, RAF (retired), test pilot A.V.Roe and Company is awarded the Queen's Commendation for Valuable Service in the Air.
- 1 January 1967 – Wing Commander Reichard Frewen Martin, DFC, AFC, lately test pilot Hawker Siddeley Aviation Ltd is appointed an Officer of the Order of the British Empire (OBE)
- In 2003, he was elected an Honorary Fellow of the Society of Experimental Test Pilots.
