= Bentley BR1 =

British WWI aircraft engine

BR1
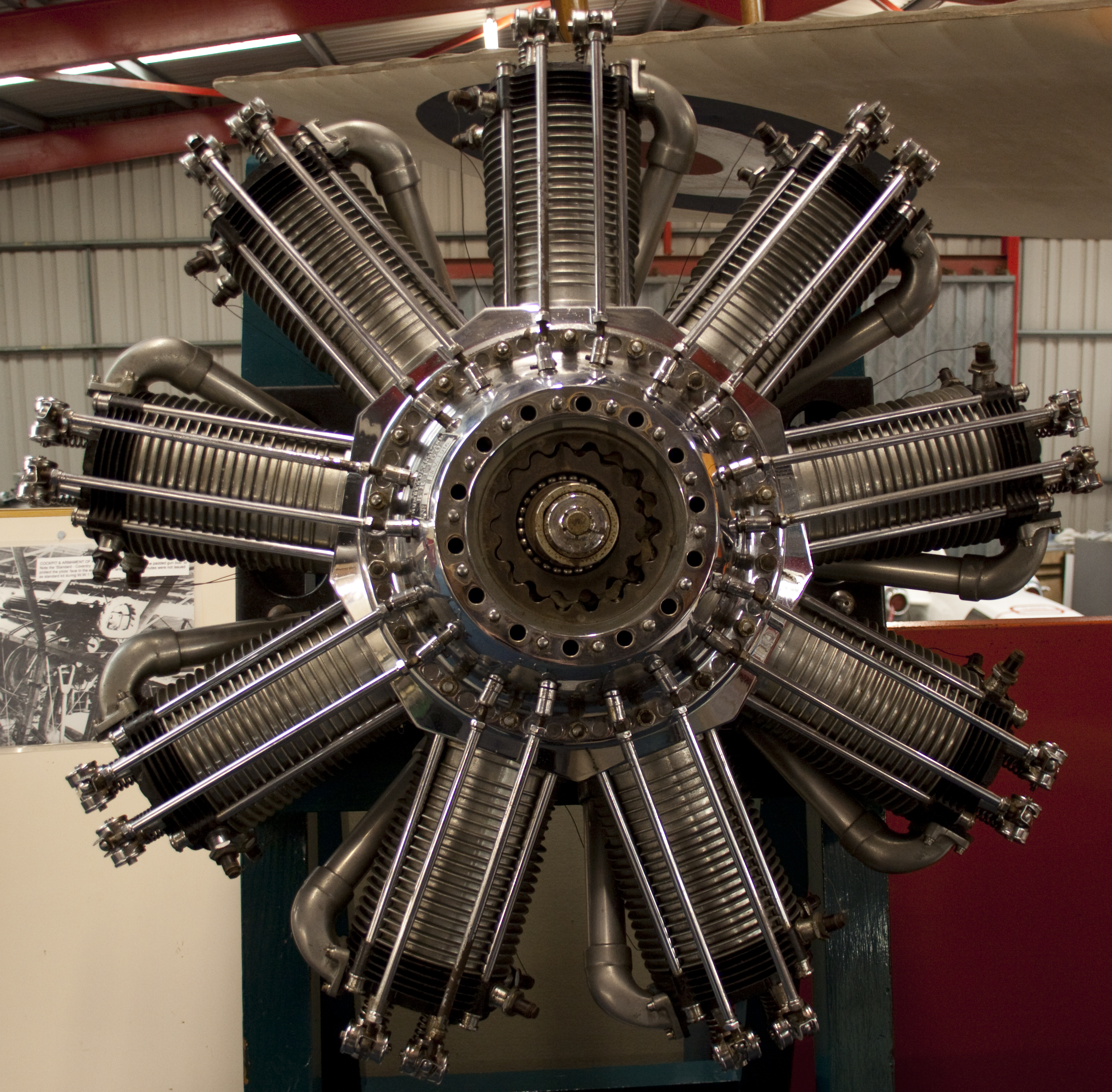
- Preserved Bentley BR1 at the Midland Air Museum
- Type: Rotary engine
- National origin: United Kingdom
- Manufacturer: Humber, Vickers
- First run: 1916
- Major applications: Sopwith Camel
- Number built: 1,123
- Developed from: Clerget 9B
- Developed into: Bentley BR.2

The Bentley BR.1 is a British rotary aircraft engine of the First World War. Designed by the motor car engine designer W. O. Bentley, BR.1s powered the majority of Sopwith Camels flown by the Royal Naval Air Service (RNAS).

== Design and development ==
During World War I, W O Bentley, already a respected motorcar designer, served as an officer in the Royal Navy. Bentley acted as a liaison officer between the RNAS and various British aero engine manufacturers. As part of his duties, Bentley was dispatched to Gwynnes’s factory in London to improve the reliability of their license built Clerget 9B rotary engines. The 130 horsepower Clerget 9B powered a number of important British aircraft, including the Sopwith 1½ Strutter however in service it was prone to overheating and seizure due to the failure of piston obturator rings.

Following technical disagreements with Gwynnes’s management, who were resistant to some of his ideas, Bentley was reassigned to work with Humber engineering whose wartime production up until that point had mostly consisted of bicycles and field kitchens.

At Humber’s works, Bentley was able to implement his ideas resulting in a rotary engine which, while outwardly similar to the Clerget 9B, featured aluminium cylinders and redesigned cylinder heads. Cylinders are fitted with shrunk in liners allowing for sealing with conventional piston rings rather than the fragile obturator rings used on the Clerget engines. Stroke was increased to 6.7 inches (17 cm) which allowed power to be increased to 150 horsepower (110 kW). The engine retained the Clerget’s signature offset epicyclical cam gears with separate pushrods for the intake and exhaust. In common with many other late war rotary engines, the new engine has two spark plugs per cylinder.

The engine was initially known as the A.R.1 for "Admiralty Rotary", but later called the BR.1 ("Bentley Rotary"). The BR.1 was standardised for the Sopwith Camel in RNAS squadrons, but there were never enough to supplant the Clerget engines in British service. Most Royal Flying Corps (RFC) Camel squadrons used Clerget engines and British production of the Clerget 9B continued until the end of the war. On the 31st of October 1918 the, newly formed, RAF had 385 Bentley BR.1 powered Camels vs 1,342 powered by Clergets. The remaining 821 aircraft were powered by either Le Rhône or Gnome Monosoupape engines.

The BR.1 was developed as the BR.2, a heavier, more powerful engine, which powered, among other types of aircraft, the Camel's eventual replacement, the Sopwith Snipe.

The BR.1 was regarded by many RNAS officers as the best available power-plant for the Sopwith Camel. In addition, the Admiralty were able to purchase the BR.1 for £643 per engine, considerably less than the £907 paid for each Clerget 9B. Although the engine was named after him, W O Bentley did not hold any commercial rights as his design work took place while he was serving as a Royal Navy officer assigned to the task of improving aero engines. In 1919 a royal commission was set up to compensate inventors of unpatented devices used by the British government during WW1. W O Bentley and Gwynnes Ltd both filed claims for work on the development of the BR.1 and BR.2. The commission eventually awarded W O Bentley a single payment of eight thousand pounds.

== Applications ==
- Avro 536
- Port Victoria P.V.9
- Sopwith Camel
- Westland N.1B

== Specifications ==
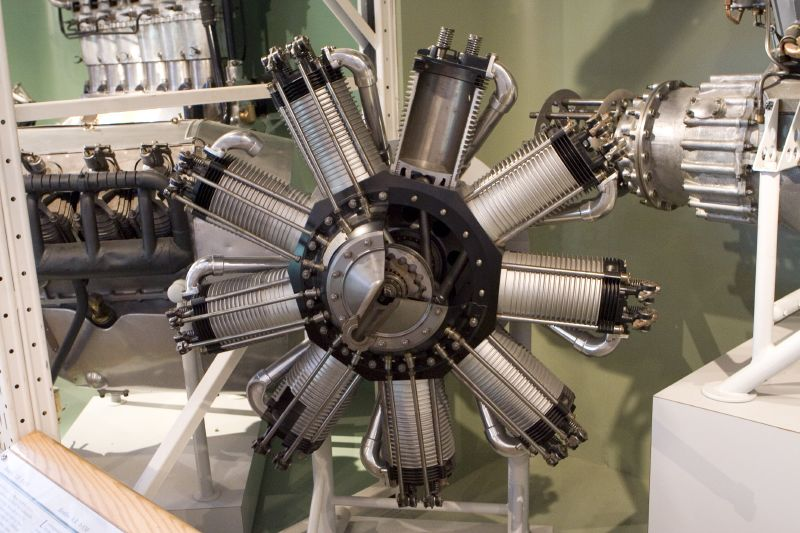
Bentley BR1 engine on display at the Canada Aviation and Space Museum, Ottawa

Data from Jane's Fighting Aircraft of World War I and Airplane Engine Encyclopedia (1921)

=== General characteristics ===
- Type: 9-cylinder air-cooled rotary engine
- Bore: 4.72 inches (120 mm)
- Stroke: 6.69 inches (170 mm)
- Displacement: 1,055.9 cu in (17.303 L)
- Diameter: 42.13 inches (1.070 m)
- Dry weight: 397 pounds (180 kg)

=== Components ===
- Oil system: Total loss, castor oil
- Cooling system: Air-cooled

=== Performance ===
- Power output: 150 bhp (110 kW) at 1,250 rpm
- Compression ratio: 5.9:1
- Fuel consumption: 13 gallon/hr (49 L/hr)
- Oil consumption: 12 pints/hr (5.7 L/hr)
- Power-to-weight ratio: 0.38 bhp/lb

== See also ==
Related development

- Bentley BR2

Comparable engines

- Clerget 9B
- Clerget 9Z
- Gnome Monosoupape 9 Type N
- Le Rhone 9J

Related lists

- List of aircraft engines
