= Bentley BR2 =

1910s British piston aircraft engine

BR.2
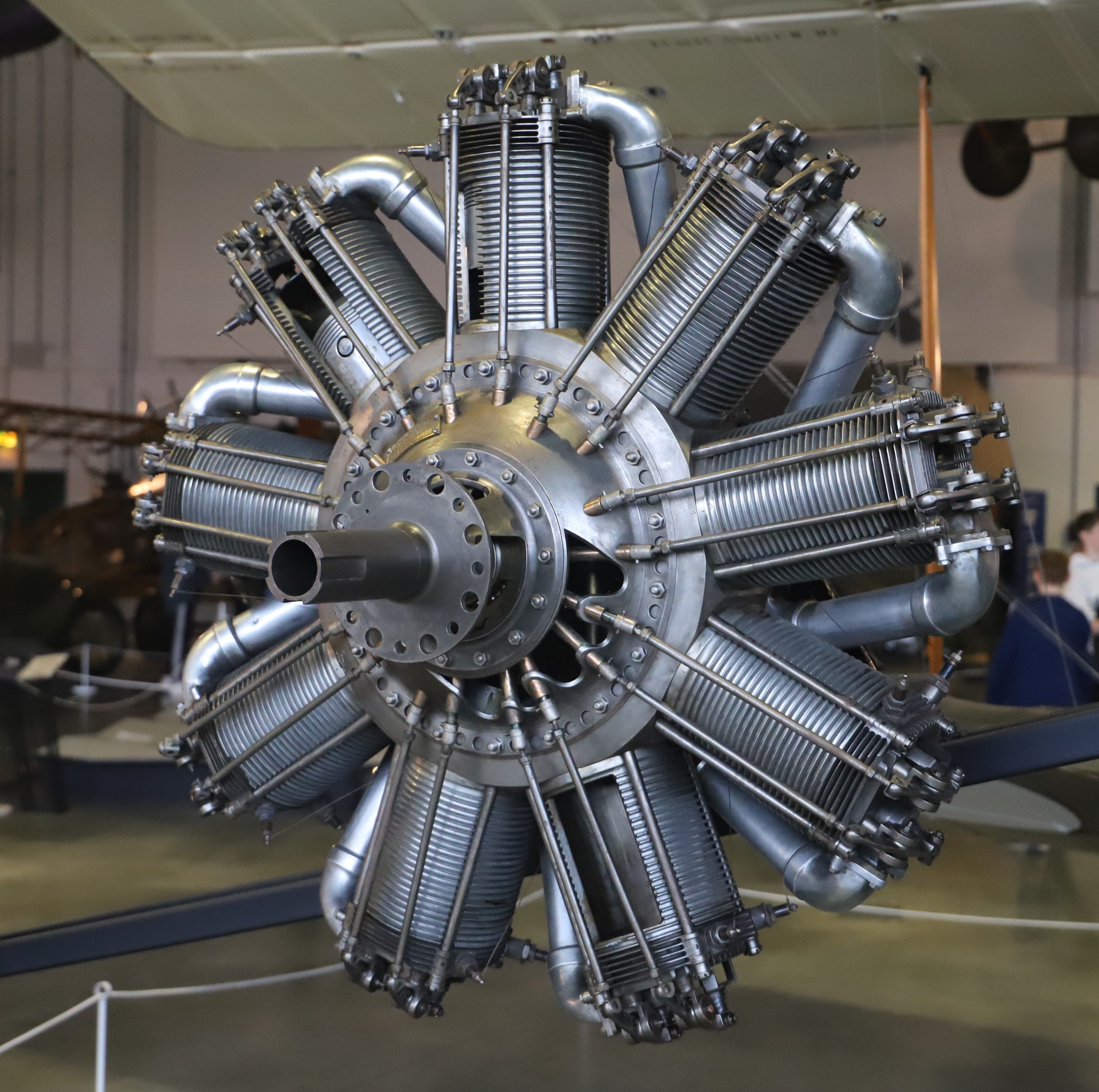
- B.R.2 engine on display at the RAF Museum London
- Type: Rotary engine
- National origin: United Kingdom
- Manufacturer: Humber, Crossley, Daimler, Gwynnes, Ruston and Proctor
- First run: 1917
- Major applications: Sopwith Snipe
- Number built: 2,567
- Developed from: Bentley BR.1

The Bentley B.R.2 was a nine-cylinder British rotary aircraft engine developed during the First World War by the motor car engine designer W. O. Bentley from his earlier Bentley BR.1. The BR.2 was built in small numbers during the war, its main use being by the Royal Air Force in the early 1920s.

== Design and development ==
The initial variant of the BR.2 developed 230 hp (170 kW), with nine cylinders measuring 5.5 in × 7.1 in (140 mm × 180 mm) for a total displacement of 1,522 cu in (24,940 cm^{3}). It weighed 490 lb (220 kg), only 93 lb (42 kg) more than the Bentley BR.1. This was the last type of rotary engine to be adopted by the RAF – later air-cooled aircraft engines such as the Cosmos Jupiter and Armstrong Siddeley Jaguar being almost entirely of the fixed radial type. With the BR.2, the rotary engine had reached a point beyond which this type of engine could not be further developed, due to its inherent limitations.

== Applications ==
The type selected as the standard single-seat fighter of the post-war RAF, the Sopwith Snipe, had been designed around the BR.2, as had its ground attack version, the Sopwith TF.2 Salamander. A number of other experimental and minor production types were either designed for, or otherwise fitted with this power plant during the late "war" years and into the early 1920s.

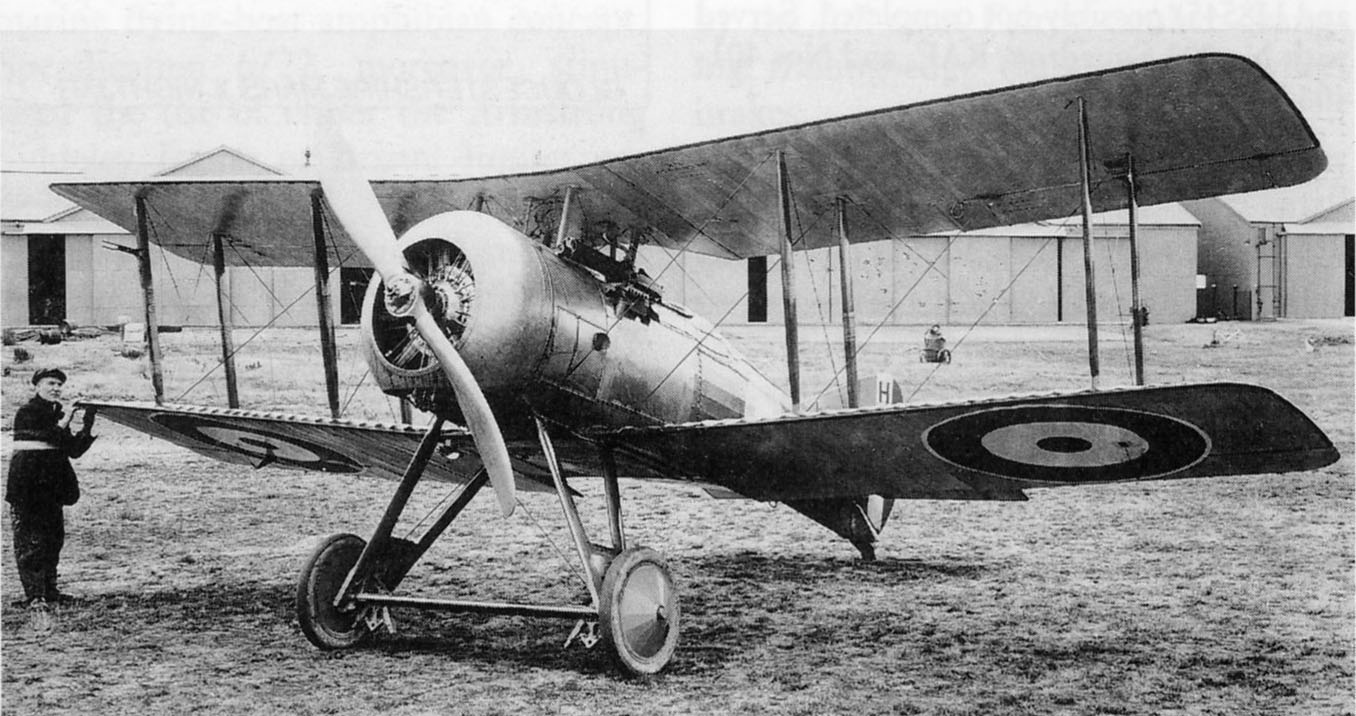
Gloster Nightjar during evaluation at Farnborough in 1922

- Armstrong Whitworth Armadillo
- Austin Osprey
- Boulton Paul Bobolink
- Brennan Helicopter
- Gloster Grouse
- Gloster Nightjar
- Gloster Sparrowhawk
- Grain Griffin
- Handley Page Type S
- Nieuport Nightjar
- Parnall Panther
- Sopwith Buffalo
- Sopwith Gnu
- Sopwith Salamander
- Sopwith Snipe
- Vickers Vampire

== Variants ==
BR.2 230
1918, 230 hp.
BR.2 245
1918, 245 hp.

== Engines on display ==
A Bentley BR.2 is on public display in the Science Museum (London), another forms part of the aero engine collection at the Royal Air Force Museum Cosford. Another one (serial number 40543, manufactured by Gwynnes) is in the National Military Museum, Romania.

The sole operational BR.2 is mounted in Fantasy of Flight's replica of the Sopwith Snipe.

A ¼ scale working replica of the Bentley BR.2 World War I rotary aero engine built by Lewis Kinleside Blackmore is currently on display at the Bentley Memorial Building in Oxfordshire, UK. This was the first model built of this engine and is the subject also of a book by L K Blackmore.

The Canada Aviation and Space Museum in Ottawa, Ontario, Canada has a BR.2 installed in their Sopwith 7F.1 Snipe.

== Specifications (BR.2) ==
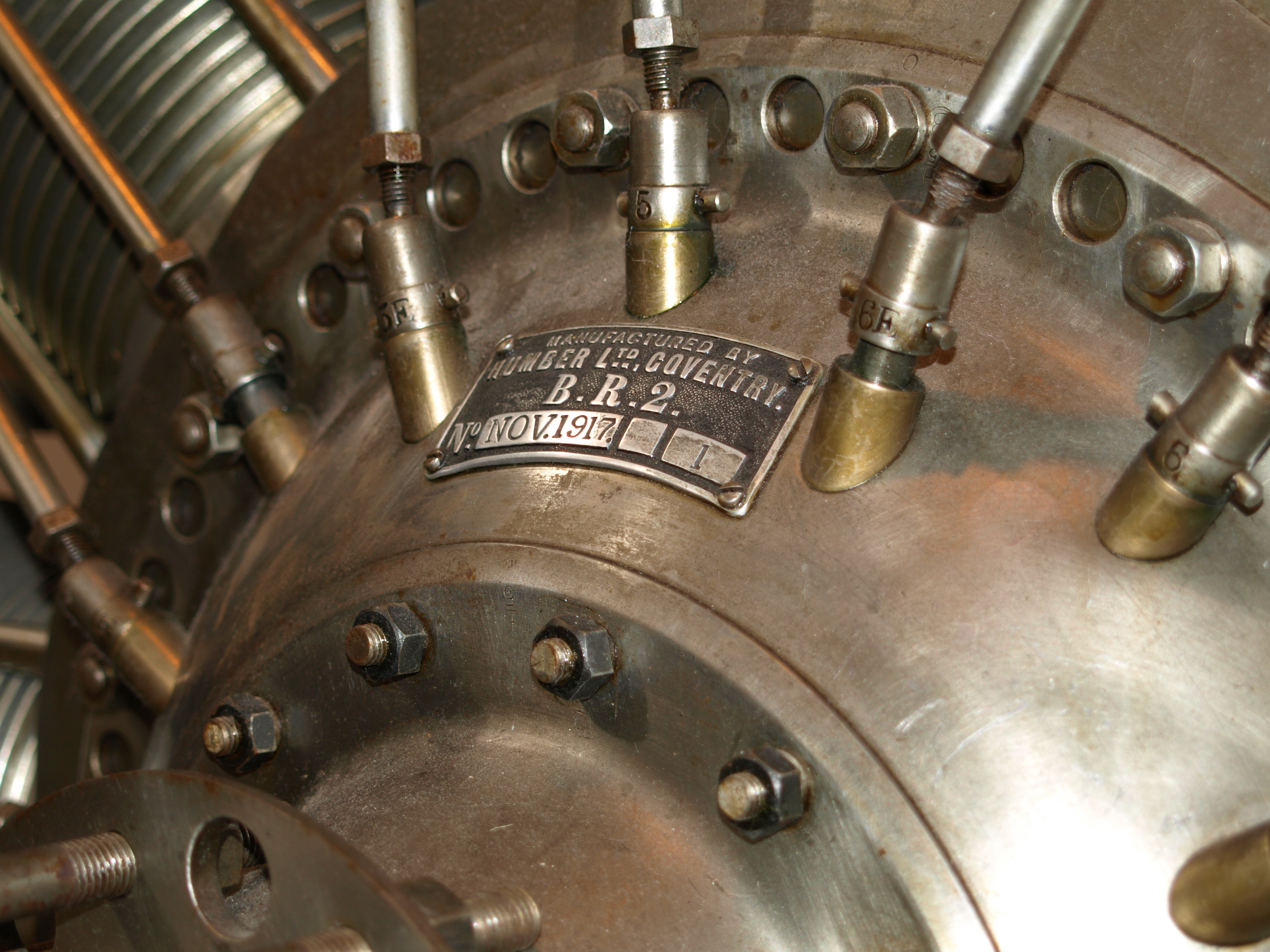
Manufacturer's plate (dated November 1917) and valve operating gear of the BR.2 engine on display at the Royal Air Force Museum Cosford

Data from Jane's

=== General characteristics ===
- Type: 9-cylinder rotary
- Bore: 5.51 in (140 mm)
- Stroke: 7.09 in (180 mm)
- Displacement: 1521.8 in (24.94 L)
- Dry weight: 490 lb (220 kg)

=== Components ===
- Valvetrain: Overhead valve
- Cooling system: Air-cooled

=== Performance ===
- Power output: 250 hp
- Fuel consumption: 20 gallons per hour
- Oil consumption: 16 pints per hour
- Power-to-weight ratio: 0.5 hp/lb

== See also ==
Related development

- Bentley BR.1
- Clerget

Comparable engines

- Le Rhône

Related lists

- List of aircraft engines
