= Nieuport & General Aircraft =

British aircraft manufacturer

Nieuport & General Aircraft Company Limited
- Founded: November 1916
- Defunct: 1920
- Fate: Dissolved
- Headquarters: Cricklewood, London, United Kingdom

The Nieuport & General Aircraft Company Ltd was a British aircraft manufacturer, established during the First World War to build French Nieuport aircraft under licence, which closed down in 1920.

== History ==
On 16 November 1916, Samuel Waring, the owner of the furniture manufacturer Waring & Gillow, established the Nieuport & General Aircraft Company at Cricklewood, London to build the French Nieuport 11 fighter under licence. It built 50 Nieuport 17bis fighters before production changed to the more capable Sopwith Camel, building 400 Camels, with 100 Sopwith Snipes being delivered postwar.

In 1917, an official Inquiry (the Burbidge Report) into the activities of the Royal Aircraft Factory led to design and construction of aircraft at Farnborough being stopped, and the Factory's design teams being broken up. Nieuport & General took advantage of this situation to hire Henry Folland, the designer of the S.E.5 fighter, as chief designer. Folland designed a number of aircraft, with the Nieuport Nighthawk fighter being ordered into production in August 1918, but the failure of the engine chosen to power it together with the end of the First World War, led to production being ended and the Nighthawk not entering service.

Nieuport & General was closed down in August 1920, together with the other aircraft companies owned by Waring, British Aerial Transport (BAT) and the Alliance Aeroplane Company. Folland was hired by the Gloster Aircraft Company, continuing development of the Nighthawk.

== Aircraft ==
- Nieuport B.N.1
- Nieuport Nighthawk
- Nieuport London
