= Henry Folland =

Henry Philip Folland OBE (22 January 1889 – 5 September 1954) was an English aviation engineer and aircraft designer.

== Early years ==
Folland was born on 22 January 1889 to Frederick and Mary Folland at 2 King Street, Holy Trinity, Cambridge. His father was listed as a Stonemason.

== Aviation career ==
In 1905, Folland became an apprentice at the Lanchester Motor Company in Birmingham, he then joined the design staff at Swift Motor Company and then in 1908 he became a draughtsman at the Daimler Company. It was at Daimler that he developed his interest in powered flying machines. Folland worked at the Royal Aircraft Factory at Farnborough from 1912, where he was lead designer on the S.E.4 and later S.E.5. The S.E.4 was the fastest aircraft known in 1914, and the S.E.5 was a major fighter aircraft during the First World War. He also designed the Royal Aircraft Factory's "Aerial Target" (built by Ruston Proctor), an anti-Zeppelin pilotless aircraft designed to use A M Low's radio control systems.

Folland left the Royal Aircraft Factory in 1917, joining the Nieuport & General Aircraft company as chief designer., designing the Nieuport Nighthawk, which was adopted as a standard fighter by the Royal Air Force but did not enter service owing to the problems in development of its ABC Dragonfly engine. Not long after starting at Nieuport, Folland was joined by Howard Preston – a design and stress man – who was also to work with him later at Gloster and Follands. Nieuport & General ceased operations in 1920 and his services were taken up by the Gloster Aircraft Company, who had built Nighthawks under licence during the First World War, joining them in 1921.

Folland was the chief designer for Gloster for many years, producing a range of successful fighter aircraft such as the Grebe, Gamecock, Gauntlet and finally the Gloster Gladiator.

=== Folland Aircraft Ltd ===
Folland left the company in 1937, following the takeover of Gloster by Hawker, feeling that Hawker designs would be favoured over his own. Folland purchased the British Marine Aircraft Company at Hamble, near Southampton, renaming it Folland Aircraft Limited.

Initially, Folland Aircraft was mainly involved in sub-contract work for other aircraft manufacturers particularly during the Second World War. Some 45 civil and military projects were offered by Folland to meet Air Ministry requirements. Only one – the Fo.108 – a flying engine testbed nicknamed the "Frightful" from its appearance, was accepted and 12 of these were built.

The company's most well-known design was the Gnat, famously a member of the Yellowjacks and the Red Arrows and succeeded by the Hawker Siddeley Hawk as the RAF's main fast jet training aircraft. However Folland never lived to see its first flight.

== Later years ==
By July 1951, Folland was suffering from severe ill health and resigned as managing director being succeeded by the designer W. E. W. Petter who had left English Electric. Nonetheless, he remained on the Board until his death on 4 September 1954. Three weeks earlier, Petter's Folland Midge, the precursor to the Folland Gnat had made its first flight. In his book, Sky Fever, Sir Geoffrey de Havilland describes Folland as becoming a recluse after he retired as managing director.
