= 1920 in aviation =

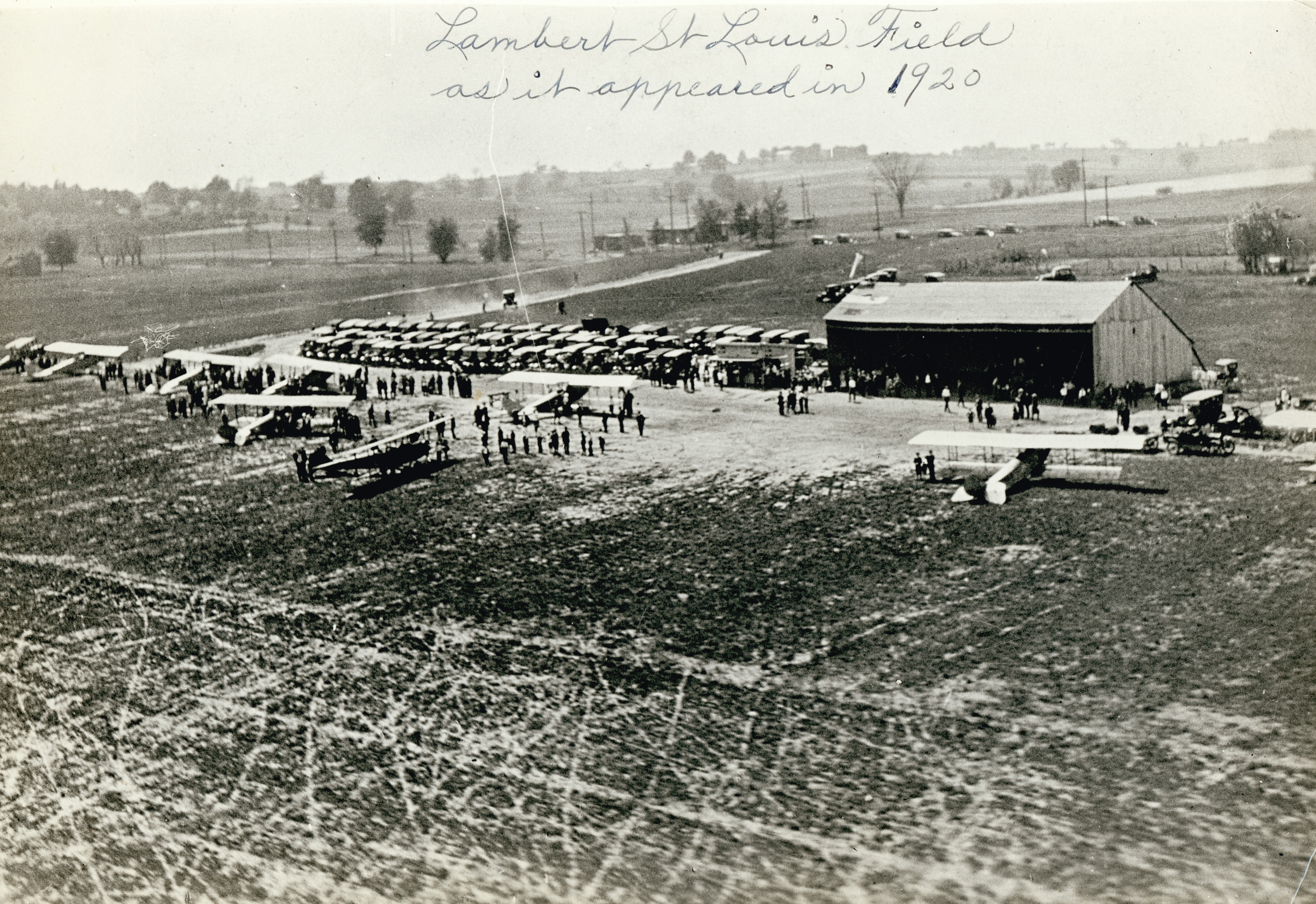
Lambert–St. Louis Flying Field during its first air meet, 25 November 1920.

This is a list of aviation-related events from 1920:

== Events ==
- Juan de la Cierva y Cordoniu invents the autogyro. His first autogyro, the Cierva C.1, fails to become airborne, but is the first aircraft to demonstrate the principle of autorotation as it taxis on the ground.
- The Argentine Navy establishes a naval aviation division and allocates funds for the founding of a naval aviation school.
- The Peruvian Navy establishes a Naval Aviation Corps.
- Imperial Japanese Army aviation elements see combat for the first time in operations around Vladivostok during the Siberian Intervention.
- The Aichi Clock and Electric Company Ltd. begins the production of airframes at Nagoya, Japan. It will begin producing aircraft engines in 1927.
- Mitsubishi Internal Combustion Engine Company Ltd. registers as an aircraft manufacturing company, with its factory at Kobe, Japan, and takes over the aircraft manufacturing business of its parent company, Mitsubishi Heavy Industries.
- The Stinson Aircraft Company is founded in Ohio in the United States.
- British military thinker Colonel J. F. C. Fuller writes that in the next war "Fleets of aeroplanes will attack the enemy's great industrial and governing centres. All these attacks will be made against the civil population in order to compel it to accept the will of the attacker..."

=== January ===
- January 3 – Discussing the possibility of an airplane flight from San Francisco, California, Sir Arthur Whitten Brown — who had made a transatlantic flight in 1919 — says "there are no airplanes of sufficient flying radius" to make such a flight.
- January 17 – The first United States Navy airplane flight in the Hawaiian Islands takes place when a plane takes off from Honolulu.
- January 21
  - The last Royal Navy balloon ship, HMS Canning, which has operated since December 1916 as a balloon depot ship, is sold.
  - The Royal Air Force's "Z Unit" – the first self-contained air unit dedicated to "aerial policing", the use of independent air power to suppress colonial rebellions – begins operations in British Somaliland against the Dervish State of Diiriye Guure and Mohammed Abdullah Hassan (the "Mad Mullah") using 10 Airco DH.9s. On the first day, a DH.9 drops a bomb on the tent of the Mullah – who has never seen an airplane before and whose advisers tell him that the aircraft must be either chariots from Allah or friendly messengers from the Ottoman Empire's Sultan Mehmed VI – while he waits to receive their crews as important guests. He survives and flees. The Z Unit will continue to bomb and strafe the Mullah's forces on January 22 and 23.
- January 24 – Extensive aerial reconnaissance by the Royal Air Force's Z Unit establishes that the Dervish State has abandoned the area around its Dhulbahante garesa forts at Medishi (later Medistie) and Jid Ali (later Jideli). Independent air operations against the forces of Diiriye Guure and Mohammed Abdullah Hassan end, and the Z Unit begins direct support to British troops pursuing Hassan.
- January 29 – Royal Air Force Airco DH.9s bomb the Dervish State's Dhulbahante garesa fort at Gallbaridur.
- January 30 – Royal Air Force DH.9s bomb Mohammed Abdullah Hassan's baggage train and personal retinue, but he survives.

=== February ===
- Alan A. Griffith's analysis of the process of brittle fracture is published.
- Early in the month, Royal Air Force Airco DH.9s bomb the Dervish State stronghold at Tale, including Mohammed Abdullah Hassan's personal compound. Hassan again survives and flees into Abyssinia. The British campaign to restore their control over British Somaliland comes to a successful conclusion in only three weeks, at a low cost in British lives and money. It is the prototype of the "aerial policing" of rebellious colonies that the Royal Air Force will conduct in the 1920s and 1930s, most notably in Iraq.
- February 1
  - The South African Air Force is established as an independent air arm.
  - The first interisland commercial flight in the Hawaiian Islands takes place when pilot Charles Fern carries a paying passenger from Honolulu to Maui and back. The outbound flight requires an emergency stop on Molokai.
- February 2 – World War I United States Army Air Service Captain Field Eugene Kindley, who had shot down 12 German planes during the war, is killed in the crash of his SE.5 while performing a demonstration flight for General of the Armies John J. Pershing at Kelly Field near San Antonio, Texas.
- February 4 – Pierre van Ryneveld and Quintin Brand set out in a Vickers Vimy from Cairo to cross Africa by air from North to South. They will arrive in Cape Town on March 20.
- February 5 – The Royal Air Force College is established at Cranwell, Lincolnshire.
- February 14 – Eleven Italian aircraft – three Caproni Ca.3 bombers and eight Asaldo SVA-9 trainers – take off from Centocelle Airport in Rome to fly to Tokyo. Only two of the planes – SVA-9s flying as pathfinders for the rest of the planes, piloted by Arturo Ferrarin and Guido Masiero – will complete the journey, arriving in Tokyo on May 31.
- February 18 – The French military pilot Joseph Vuillemin and his observer, Lieutenant Chalus, complete the first flight across the Sahara Desert.
- February 25 – The United States Department of War authorizes the United States Army Air Service to establish its own service schools analogous to the service schools of the United States Army and United States Navy.
- February 27 – Piloting a U.S. Army Air Service Packard-Le Peré LUSAC-11 fighter equipped with one of the first turbochargers, Major Rudolf Schroeder(de) sets a new world altitude record of 10,099 metres (33,133 feet). His oxygen system fails and he passes out; he regains consciousness only very near the ground and lands safely, but is hospitalized.

=== March ===
- March 9 – A DH-4 from Aberdeen Proving Grounds piloted by Lt. Rene Studler drops aerial bombs against an ice dam on the Susquehanna River to break it up and prevent flooding.
- March 15 – The sixth-highest-scoring German ace of World War I, Rudolf Berthold, is killed by a rioting mob in Harburg, Hamburg, Germany.
- March 16 – The Royal Air Force renames its Marine Aircraft Experimental Station the "Marine and Armament Experimental Establishment" to reflect its involvement in evaluating weapons and equipment as well as seaplanes, flying boats, and other aircraft connected with naval operations. In March 1924 it will become the Marine Aircraft Experimental Establishment.
- March 24
  - The United States Navy decommissions the collier USS Jupiter at the Norfolk Navy Yard, for her conversion into its first aircraft carrier, designated CV-1.
  - The United States Coast Guard opens Coast Guard Air Station Morehead City at Morehead City, North Carolina. It is the first Coast Guard Air Station.
- March 28 – Croydon Airport replaces Hounslow Heath Aerodrome as London's airport.

=== April ===
- Three Imperial Japanese Navy Yoko-type seaplanes fly from Yokosuka, Japan, to Kure, Japan; Chinkai, Korea; Sasebo, Japan; and back to Yokosuka. On the last leg they fly non-stop for a world-record 11 hours 30 minutes, the first time any fixed-wing aircraft has flown nonstop for more than 10 hours.
- In the United Kingdom, the Women's Royal Air Force is disbanded.
- April 17 - The Venezuelan Air Force is formed, with a flying school at Maracay.

=== May ===
- May 8 – Under the terms of the Treaty of Versailles, the German Army's air service, the Luftstreitkräfte, is dissolved. Germany will not have a military air service again until the establishment of the German Air Force, the Luftwaffe, in February 1935.
- May 17
  - KLM and Aircraft Transport and Travel begin a joint air service between London and Amsterdam.
  - Canada establishes the Canadian Air Force, forerunner of the Royal Canadian Air Force.
- May 31
  - Italian pilots Arturo Ferrarin and Guido Masiero land at Tokyo, Japan, flying Ansaldo SVA-9 trainers, the only two out of 11 Italian planes to complete a flight begun from Rome on February 14. Their 106-day, 11,000-mile (17,700-km) journey has included only 23 flying days, during which they have averaged 99.5 miles per hour (160 km/h) while in the air. During the trip, they had stopped at Bari in Italy; Valona in Albania; Thessaloniki, Greece; İzmir, Aydın, and Antalya in Turkey; Aleppo, Baghdad, and Basrah in Mesopotamia; Bushehr, Bandar Abbas, and Chabar in Persia; and in rural Baluchistan (for repairs), Hyderabad, at an unnamed place (for repairs), and in Karachi, and Delhi in British India. At Delhi, Masiero's SVA-9 had been destroyed in a hard landing, so he and his mechanic had taken a train to Calcutta, while Ferrarin and his mechanic had flown on to Calcutta, stopping at Allahabad and flying over the Taj Mahal at Agra along the way. From Calcutta, the two pilots had switched to new SVA-9s and flown on to Rangoon in Burma; Bangkok and Ubon in Siam; Hanoi in French Indochina; Portuguese Macao; and Guangzhou and Fuzhou in China, where Masiero's SVA-9 had been destroyed in a crash. Masiero and his mechanic had then traveled to Shanghai by boat while Ferrarin flew there. At Shanghai, Masiero had taken possession of a new SVA-9 and the two pilots had flown on to Qingdao and Mukden in China; Sinuiju, Seoul, and Taegu in Chosen; and then across the Sea of Japan to a stop at Osaka, Japan, before arriving at Yoyogi Army Field in Tokyo.
  - Bert Hinkler flies the first leg of an attempt to fly from England to Australia in an Avro Baby, departing London's Croydon Airport and flying to Turin, Italy, in 9 hours 30 minutes, crossing the Alps during the flight. Although mechanical problems force him to abandon his plans to continue beyond Turin, he wins the Britannia Trophy for his Croydon-Turin flight.

=== June ===
- An airplane takes off from a ship for the first time in Japan when Lieutenant Kuwabara flies an imported Sopwith Pup off a deck mounted on the seaplane carrier Wakamiya.
- June 4 - The United States Congress passes the United States Army Reorganization Act, which establishes the United States Army Air Service as a combatant arm of the United States Army but dashes the hopes of U.S. Army aviators for an American independent air arm like Britain's Royal Air Force for some twenty-seven years.
- June 11 – At the Langley Memorial Aeronautical Laboratory at Langley Field in Hampton, Virginia, the National Advisory Committee for Aeronautics's (NACA's) first wind tunnel becomes operational.

=== July ===
- The French airline Société Générale de Transports Aérien (SGTA) opens a Paris-Brussels route, using the Farman F.60 Goliath airliner.
- July 1 – Belgium establishes the first internal air-service in any European colony with the Lara-Ligne Aérienne Roi Albert in the Belgian Congo.
- July 3 – The first Royal Air Force Pageant is held, at London.
- July 4 – The first civil airplane fatalities in Cuba take place when a Bleriot XI piloted by the famed Cuban aviator Jaime González Grocier stalls on takeoff and crashes at Havana, killing him and another person on board.
- July 5 – United States Army Lieutenant Patrick H. Logan is fatally injured after his Nieuport 28 fighter "Red Devil" (serial number F6506) of the United States Army Air Service's 104th Observation Squadron crashes at Dundalk Flying Field, in Baltimore, Maryland, during the airport's inaugural air show following a stall and spin. In response to the tragedy, the airfield, which had just opened, is renamed Logan Field in his honor, with the announcement of the new name being made at the closing ceremonies of the air show during which he died.
- July 22 – Donald W. Douglas and Davis R. Davis found the Davis-Douglas Company in Los Angeles, California.
- July 24 – The fifth annual Aerial Derby is held, sponsored for the first time by the Royal Aero Club, with a trophy and a £500 prize for the overall winner and prizes of £250, £100, and £50 for the first three places in the handicap competition. Fifteen participants fly over a 102.5-mile (165-kilometer) circuit beginning and ending at Hendon Aerodrome in London with control points at Brooklands, Esher, Purley, and Purfleet; the aircraft fly the circuit twice. F. T. Courtney is the overall winner, completing the course in a Martinsyde Semiquaver at an average speed of 154.70 mph (248.97 km/h) in 38 minutes 47.2 seconds with a handicap of 1 minute; H. A. Hammersley wins the handicap competition in an Avro Baby for the second consecutive year with a time of 2 hours 32 minutes 6 seconds at an average speed of 78.89 mph (126.96 km/h) with a handicap of 1 hour 35 minutes 0 seconds.
- July 29 – The United States Post Office's first transcontinental airmail flight takes off from New York City.

=== August ===
- The British Nieuport & General Aircraft Company goes out of business.
- August 2 – Filming a nighttime spin before a large crowd at DeMille Field in Los Angeles, California, as a stunt for the movie The Skywayman, stunt pilot and film actor Ormer Locklear and his flying partner Milton "Skeets" Elliot are killed when their Curtiss JN-4 crashes into the sludge pool of an oil well, igniting a massive explosion and fire.
- August 7 – Danish Air Lines begins flight operations, using a Friedrichshafen FF.49 (registration T-DABA) on the route Copenhagen-Malmö-Warnemünde.
- August 14 – The United States Department of War authorizes the United States Army Air Service to establish its first service school, the Air Service School, at Langley Field, Virginia. It is the predecessor of the Air Corps Tactical School.
- August 20 – American stunt piot Laura Bromwell sets a loop the loop record of 87 loops in 1 hour 15 minutes.
- August 24 – An aircraft crashes into the floatplane-equipped Chilean Navy armored cruiser O'Higgins, killing its pilot.

=== September ===
- Post-World War I budget cuts have reduced United States Marine Corps aviation from almost 400 aviators to fewer than 50, prompting the Marine Corps' first aviator, Major Alfred A. Cunningham, to write in the Marine Corps Gazette, "One of the greatest handicaps which Marine Corps Aviation must now overcome is a combination of doubt as to usefulness, lack of sympathy, and a feeling on the part of some line officers that aviators and aviation men are not real Marines."
- September 5 – SCADTA begins operations. Latin America's first airline, it will merge with SACO in June 1940 to form Colombia's national airline, Avianca.
- September 8 – The final leg is added to the U.S. transcontinental airmail service, across the Rocky Mountains from Omaha, Nebraska, to Sacramento, California. Because flying at night is dangerous, the mail is carried along the route by train during the hours of darkness.
- September 16 – Sopwith Aviation Company is liquidated. T. O. M. Sopwith, Harry Hawker, Fred Sigrist and Bill Eyre form a successor company known as H. G. Hawker Engineering.
- September 20 – The 1920 Schneider Trophy race is flown at Venice, Italy. Lieutenant Luigi Bolgna in a Savoia S.12 is the only starter and wins simply by finishing the race, with an average speed of 172.6 km/h (107.2 mph).
- September 26 – Geoffrey de Havilland incorporates the de Havilland Aircraft Company.

=== October ===
- Émile Dewoitine establishes Constructions Aéronautiques Émile Dewoitine in Toulouse, France. The company manufactures aircraft under the name Dewoitine.
- October 7–17 – The first transcontinental flight in Canada takes place, under the auspices of the Air Board. The flight begins when Lieutenant Colonel Robert R. Leckie, Major Basil D. Hobbs, and mechanic C. W. Heath take off from Dartmouth Air Station in Halifax, Nova Scotia, in a Fairey IIIC seaplane. Forced to crash-land in the Saint John River, they switch to a Curtiss HS-2L flying boat and continue, making stops at Fredericton, New Brunswick, and Riviere du Loup, Quebec. They then fly a Felixstowe F.3 flying boat to Rockcliffe Park in Ottawa, Ontario. From there, with Captain G. O. Johnson as navigator, they continue westward in the F.3 to Sault Ste. Marie and Kenora, Ontario, and Selkirk, Manitoba, where mist forces them to land on the Red River before they proceed to Winnipeg, Manitoba, which they reach on October 11. The flight continues with three relay stages flown in three different de Havilland DH.9A aircraft, the first piloted by Flight Lieutenant J. B. Home-Hay from Winnipeg to Regina, Saskatchewan, the second by Flight Lieutenant C. W. Cudamore to Calgary, Alberta, and the third — a six-day journey through mountain valleys which includes forced landings at Revelstoke and Merrett, British Columbia, due to snow, fog, and low cloud — by Flight Lieutenant G. A. Thompson to Richmond, British Columbia, with Air Commodore A. K. Tylee as a passenger. The flight concludes at Minoru Park in Richmond on October 17, 10 1/2 days after the departure from Halifax, having covered 3,341 miles (5,377 km) at an average speed of 63 miles per hour (101 km/h) with a total flying time of 49 hours 7 minutes.
- October 15 – Aviator Edward Hubbard is awarded the first contract international air mail route, from Seattle, Washington, to Victoria, British Columbia, Canada. He will employ the Boeing B-1 flying boat on the route.
- October 20 – France's first shipboard landing of a wheeled aircraft takes place when French Navy Lieutenant de vaisseau (Ship-of-the-Line Lieutenant) Paul Teste, piloting a Hanriot single-seater, takes off from Palyvestre and lands on a platform mounted aboard the incomplete battleship Béarn anchored at Toulon. Teste cuts his throttle at an altitude of 50 centimetres (20 inches) and rolls to a stop on the platform in less than 30 metres (98 feet).
- October 27 – Ecuador creates the Ecuadorian Air Force.

=== November ===
- The Royal Air Force's No. 60 Squadron sees active service against rebel tribesmen in the Northwest Frontier Province of British India.
- Finding his workshops too large for peacetime aircraft production, Adolphe Bernard closes the Etablissements Adolphe Bernard (Adolphe Bernard Establishments) and reorganizes the company as the Société Industrielle des Métaux et du Bois (SIMB; Industrial Company for Metals and Wood). In its new guiuse, the firm ceases aircraft production and diversifies its manufacturing activities. It will not resume aircraft production until 1922. After a 1926 bankruptcy Bernard will reorganize it again in 1927 as the Société des Avions Bernard (Bernard Aircraft Company).
- November 1
  - The United States Post Office awards a contract for international air mail to Aeromarine West Indies Airways.
  - At Langley Field, Virginia, the United States Army Air Service′s Air Service School – predecessor of the Air Corps Tactical School – opens its first class.
- November 11 – United States Marine Corps Second Lieutenant Ralph Talbot and Gunnery Sergeant Robert Guy Robinson become the first U.S. Marine Corps aviators to receive the Medal of Honor, for an action in an Airco DH.4 against German fighters over Belgium on October 14, 1918. Talbot's award is posthumous, as he had died during a test flight on October 25, 1918.
- November 16 – The Australian airline Qantas is founded in Winton, Queensland as Queensland and Northern Territory Aerial Services Ltd. by Paul McGinness, Hudson Fysh, Fergus McMaster, and Arthur Baird.

=== December ===
- The Australian Parliament passes the Air Navigation Act 1920.
- December 2 – Pilot Frank Briggs lands in Perth, Australia, after making the first flight from Melbourne to Perth, a distance of 3,392 km (2,108 miles), in an Airco (De Havilland) D.H. 4.
- December 10 – Military aviation begins in Venezuela with the opening of the Venezuelan Military Aviation School as a component of the Venezuelan Army.
- December 14 – Immediately after taking off in fog from Cricklewood Aerodrome in Cricklewood, London, a Handley Page O/400 operated by Handley Page Transport strikes trees, crashes in Golders Green, and catches fire, killing four of the eight people on board.
- December 16 – Frank Briggs completes the first east-to-west or west-to-east crossing of Australia, traveling east-to-west between Sydney and Perth, covering a distance of 3,912 km (2,431 miles), in a de Havilland DH.4. (For the first south to north crossing, by Henry Wrigley and Arthur Murphy, see 1919 in aviation). Also on board are Briggs' employer, aviation entrepreneur C. J. (Jack) De Garis and mechanic Jack Howard. They had left Perth in the early hours of December 13 and spent 21 hours, 38 minutes in the air (not including re-fueling).
- December 28 – Exhibition pilot Frank Hawks takes 23-year-old Amelia Earhart on her first flight – a 10-minute "hop" Earhart's father had arranged and paid $10 for – at a state fair in Los Angeles, California. Both Hawks and Earhart will becomes famous aviators in the years ahead for various firsts and records.

== First flights ==
- Farman F.70
- Hanriot HD-14

=== February ===
- Avro 547

=== April ===
- April 8 – de Havilland DH.18
- April 9 – Potez VIII
- April 13 – Nieuport London

=== May ===
- Latécoère 4

=== June ===
- June 11 – Verville VCP

=== July ===
- July 7 – Fairey Pintail
- July 13 – U.S. Navy D-class blimp

=== September ===
- Blackburn T.1 Swift
- September 19 – Saunders Kittiwake

=== October ===
- October 13 – Naval Aircraft Factory TF

=== November ===
- November 19 – Parnall Puffin

== Entered service ==
- Westland Limousine

=== August ===
- Fokker F.II with KLM

== Retirements ==
=== September ===
- Avro 538 by Avro
