= Sopwith 1919 Schneider Cup Seaplane =

Schneider / Rainbow

General information
- Type: Racing Aircraft
- National origin: United Kingdom
- Manufacturer: Sopwith
- Number built: 1

History
- First flight: 1919
- Retired: 1923

The Sopwith Schneider of 1919 was a British racing seaplane. It was a single seat biplane intended to compete in the 1919 Schneider Trophy. After this race was abandoned due to fog, the Schneider was rebuilt into a landplane racer as the Sopwith Rainbow, being destroyed in a crash in 1923.

== Development and design ==
In 1919, it became possible to restart the Schneider Trophy races for seaplanes, which had not been held since 1914 owing to the First World War. As it was last won by the Sopwith Schneider development of the Sopwith Tabloid, the race was organised by the British Royal Aero Club, and was planned to be held at Bournemouth on 10 September that year. In order to compete in the 1919 race, the Sopwith Aviation Company designed a small floatplane, powered by the new Cosmos Jupiter radial engine. It was of all-wooden construction, with single bay wings.

== Operational history ==
The Sopwith entry, registration G-EAKI, along with entries from Supermarine (the Sea Lion) and Fairey (the Fairey III) was one of three British entries to compete in the race (the Avro 539 was eliminated prior to race-day). On the day of the race, the weather was poor, with thick fog. The Sopwith, flown by Harry Hawker together with the Fairey entry, abandoned the race owing to the fog, while the Supermarine aircraft hit debris following alighting to try to find where it was on the course, sinking when it tried to land again. The only aircraft to complete the race, the Italian SIAI S.13 was disqualified as the pilot consistently missed one of the turning points, the race being declared void.

In 1920, the Schneider Cup racer was rebuilt as a landplane and re-engined with a 320 hp (239 kW) ABC Dragonfly as the Jupiter engine which powered it in 1919 was unavailable, and known as the Sopwith Rainbow. It was entered into the 1920 Aerial Derby, but was disqualified.

It was rebuilt again in 1922 by H.G. Hawker Engineering, (Sopwith Aviation having gone into receivership in 1920), being fitted with a Bristol Jupiter II. It finished second in the 1923 Aerial Derby on 6 August, but was destroyed in a crash on 1 September 1923.

== Specifications (Schneider) ==
Data from British Civil Aircraft 1919-1972:Volume III

General characteristics

- Crew: 1
- Length: 21 ft 6 in (6.55 m)
- Wingspan: 24 ft 0 in (7.32 m)
- Height: 10 ft 0 in (3.05 m)
- Wing area: 221.75 sq ft (20.6 m^{2})
- Gross weight: 2,200 lb (1,000 kg)
- Powerplant: 1 × Cosmos Jupiter , 450 hp (336 kW)

Performance

- Maximum speed: 170 mph (274 km/h, 150 kn)
