= 1919 in aviation =

This is a list of aviation-related events from 1919:

== Events ==
- A Sopwith Baby attached to a Chilean Navy cruiser is the first shipboard aircraft in Latin American history.

=== January ===
- Flying a Breguet 14, Capitaine Coli and a Lieutenant Roget of the French Army's Aéronautique Militaire make a double crossing of the Mediterranean Sea, covering 1,000 mi (1,600 km).
- January 8 – Civil aviation resumes in Germany
- January 10 – Airco DH.4s of the Royal Air Force's No. 2 (Communications) Squadron are converted for transporting passengers and mail between London and Paris, in support of the Versailles Peace Conference.
- January 16 – Royal Air Force Major A. S. C. MacLaren and Captain Robert Halley, in a Handley Page V/1500, arrive in Delhi, completing the first England-to-India flight.
- January 19 – Jules Védrines claims a FF25,000 prize by landing an aircraft – a Caudron G-3 – on the roof of a department store in Paris. Making a hard landing in a space only 28 m × 12 m (92 ft × 39 ft), Védrines is injured and his aircraft is damaged beyond repair.

=== February ===
- February 5 – Regular flights begin between Berlin and Weimar in Germany by the Deutsche Luft-Reederei, using AEG and DFW biplanes.
- February 8 – Lucien Bossoutrot pilots a Farman F.60 Goliath carrying 12 passengers from Toussus-le-Noble, France, to RAF Kenley in England, on the first commercial flight between London and Paris to promote the Goliath and Henry Farman's plans for commercial aviation. To get around a prohibition on non-military flights still in place after the end of World War I, the Goliath's passengers are all former military pilots in uniform and carrying military orders directing them to take the flight, which takes 2 hours 30 minutes. The return flight the next day takes 2 hours 10 minutes.
- February 25 – An Air Traffic Committee made up of representatives of 36 states in the British Empire under the Council of Defence meets for the first time.

=== March ===
- An airmail service begins between Folkestone, England, and Cologne, Germany.
- March 1 – The German airline Deutsche Luft-Reederei (DLR) begins scheduled flights to Hamburg, Germany.
- March 3 – The first U.S. international airmail is carried between Vancouver, British Columbia, and Seattle, Washington, by William Boeing in a Boeing CL-4S.
- March 10 – Prime Minister of Australia Billy Hughes announces a £10,000 reward to the first aviator who will fly from the United Kingdom to Australia in less than 30 days.
- March 12 – The Lithuanian Army forms an aviation unit. This is considered the birth of the Lithuanian Air Force.
- March 22 – The first regular international commercial route opens between Paris and Brussels, flown by an F.60 Goliath from Farman airlines.
- March 24
  - Igor Sikorsky emigrates to the United States.
  - A contingent of Women's Royal Air Force (WRAF) personnel arrive in France for overseas service, the first time that WRAF personnel have served outside the United Kingdom. Later in the year, another WRAF contingent will be sent to Germany.
- March 31 – The Belgian airline SNETA (French: Syndicat national d'Etude des Transports Aériens; National Syndicate for the Study of Aerial Transport) is founded. Intended to experiment with the possibilities for commercial aviation, it will operate until it merges with other airlines to form Belgium's first true commercial airline, SABENA, on 23 May 1923.

=== April ===
- The Imperial Japanese Army further increases the independence of its aviation element by reorganizing it as the Army Air Division under the command of Major General Ikutaro Inouye.
- April 3 – In a flight to publicize the Farman F.60 Goliath airliner, a Goliath carries 14 passengers to an altitude of 6,200 meters (20,341 feet).
- April 5 – In a Breguet 14, Lieutenant Roget of the French Army's Aéronautique Militaire makes a flight from Lyon, France, to Rome, Italy, to Nice, France. Later in the year, again flying a Breguet 14, Roget and Capitaine Coli will set a French flight distance record, flying 1,900 km (1,200 mi) from Paris – Le Bourget Airport in France to Kenitra, French Morocco.
- April 15 – The United States Navy selects the collier USS Jupiter for conversion into its first aircraft carrier.
- April 18 – CMA (Compagnie des Messageries Aériennes) commences a mail and freight service between Paris and Lille, using ex-military Breguet 14s.
- April 23 – The North Sea Aerial Navigation Company starts a passenger service between Leeds and Hounslow Heath Aerodrome in ex-military Blackburn Kangaroos.
- April 29
  - During the Polish-Soviet War, Lieutenant Stefan Stec, flying a Fokker D.VIII, scores the first kill in the history of the Polish Air Force, shooting down a Ukrainian Nieuport fighter.
  - The United States Army Air Service establishes Luke Field on Ford Island in Pearl Harbor in Hawaii.

=== May ===
- Raymond Orteig offers the Orteig Prize of US$25,000 for the first non-stop transatlantic flight between New York City and Paris. Charles Lindbergh finally will win the prize in May 1927.
- A Fairey IIIC seaplane is used for a regular newspaper run, carrying the Evening Times to towns along the Kent coast of England.
- May 2 – United States Army Major Harold M. Clark, Jr., who had made the first interisland flight in Hawaii in May 1918, dies in a seaplane crash in the Miraflores Locks in the Panama Canal Zone. Clark Field in the Philippines will be named for him.
- May 8 – The United States Navy Curtiss NC-4 flying boat, piloted by United States Coast Guard pilot Elmer F. Stone and under the command of Albert Cushing Read begins an Atlantic crossing in company, to fly by short stages from Naval Air Station Rockaway on Long Island, New York, to Lisbon, Portugal.
- May 15
  - The United States Post Office Department inaugurates an intercity air route between Chicago, Illinois, and Cleveland, Ohio.
  - The U.S. Navy blimp C-5 completes a pioneering overnight flight from her base at Cape May, New Jersey, to St. John's in the Dominion of Newfoundland, becoming the first airship to visit St. John's. The U.S. Navy plans for C-5 to become the first airship to fly across the Atlantic Ocean, from St. John's to Europe. However, shortly after arriving at St. John's, C-5 breaks her mooring lines during high winds and drifts out unmanned over the Atlantic, where she crashes in the evening 85 nmi (98 mi; 157 km) from St. John's. Recovered by a British ship, C-5 never flies again.
- May 16–17 – The Curtiss NC-4 flies from Trepassey Bay in Newfoundland to Horta in the Azores.
- May 18 – Harry Hawker and Lieutenant Commander Kenneth Mackenzie-Grieve attempt a non-stop transatlantic flight in the Sopwith Atlantic but are forced to ditch their aircraft only 2,253 km (1,400 mi) after leaving Newfoundland due to an overheating engine. They are rescued, and London's Daily Mail newspaper awards them a prize of £5,000 for their attempt anyway.
- May 24 – British Handley Page Type O bombers attack Kabul, Afghanistan, during the Third Anglo-Afghan War.
- May 27 – The Curtiss NC-4 flies from the Azores to Lisbon, completing the first transoceanic flight.
- May 30–31 – The Curtiss NC-4 flies from Lisbon to Plymouth, England.

=== June ===
- June 1 – A permanent flight of World War I-surplus Curtiss JN-4s is stationed in San Diego, California, to serve as a forest fire patrol.
- June 2 – Prime Minister of the United Kingdom David Lloyd George and the British Colonial Office approve a Royal Air Force proposal to send a self-contained air unit (the "Z Unit") to British Somaliland to regain control over the colony from the Dervish State of Diiriye Guure. The campaign, which will begin in January 1920, will be the first test of the Royal Air Force concept of "aerial policing" – the use of independent air power to suppress colonial rebellions.
- June 6 – Canada becomes the first country to legislate and implement rules governing the entire domain of aviation within its borders when the Government of Canada establishes the Air Board as Canada's civil aviation authority. The Air Board is responsible for devising a means of and administering Canadian air defence, controlling and conducting all non-military government flying operations, and providing rules and regulations for all flying within Canada, including licensing, issuing air regulations, and managing air traffic. The Air Board is organized into three sections: the Department of the Controller of Civil Aviation, which controls all civil aviation; the Directorate of Flying Operations, which controls non-military government flying operations of the Air Board; and the headquarters of the Canadian Air Force.
- June 7
  - The Latvian Air Force is founded.
  - Flying a Caudron G.3, Raymonde de Laroche of France sets a women's altitude record of nearly 13,000 feet (3,962 m).
- June 8 – In the Russian Civil War, Royal Air Force Fairey IIIC seaplanes attack four armed Bolshevik steamers on Russia's Lake Onega. Although their attack has little physical effect on the ships, the Bolsheviks are taken by surprise and flee, pursued by four smaller and less-well-armed Royal Navy torpedo boats.
- June 10 – Ruth Law of the United States breaks the women's altitude record, flying to 14,700 feet (4,481 m).
- June 12 – Raymonde de Laroche again breaks the women's altitude record, flying to a height of 5,150 m (16,896 ft).
- June 14 – United States Navy pilot Charles Hammann dies in an aircraft crash at Langley Field in Virginia. He will receive the Medal of Honor posthumously in 1920 for a heroic World War I action on August 21, 1918, retroactively becoming the first U.S. aviator ever to receive the award.
- June 14–15 – Captain John Alcock and Lieutenant Arthur Whitten Brown make the first successful non-stop Atlantic crossing by air, flying a Vickers Vimy from St. John's, Newfoundland, to Clifden, Ireland, in 16 hours. They win £10,000 from the Daily Mail and are both knighted.
- June 21 – The fourth annual Aerial Derby in Britain – the first one held since 1914, the competition having been suspended during World War I – takes place, sponsored for the last time by the Daily Mail. It is dubbed the "Victory Aerial Derby" to commemorate the Allied victory in World War I. Sixteen participants fly over the same 94-mile (151-kilometer) circuit that was used in the 1914 competition, beginning and ending at Hendon Aerodrome in London with control points at Kempton Park, Esher, Purley, and Purfleet; for the first time, however, the aircraft fly the circuit twice because of the increase in the speed of airplanes since 1914. G. Gathergood is the overall winner, completing the race in 1 hour 27 minutes 42 seconds in an Airco DH.4R with no handicap; H. A. Hammersley wins the handicap competition in an Avro Baby with a time of 2 hours 41 minutes 23 seconds and a handicap of 1 hour 25 minutes 0 seconds.
- June 23 – Six Zeppelins (LZ 46, LZ 79, LZ 91, LZ103, LZ 110, and LZ 111) are destroyed at Nordholz Airbase by their own crews in order to prevent them from falling into Allied hands.
- June 25 – The world's first all-metal commercial airplane, the Junkers F.13, flies for the first time.
- June 28 – The Treaty of Versailles is signed. Among its many provisions is one which prohibits Germany from ever again possessing armed aircraft.

=== July ===
- After resuming flying lessons (which he had discontinued in June 1914) during the first half of 1919, Winston Churchill, the United Kingdom's first Secretary of State for Air, suffers only severe bruises in the crash of an airplane which he is piloting during a lesson; his instructor, however, is hospitalised for several months with severe injuries and undergoes numerous reconstructive surgeries. Churchill never again takes flying lessons.
- In a speech at Centocelle Airport in Rome, Gabriele D'Annunzio proposes that Italy mount a Rome-to-Tokyo flight that he will lead. Although he drops out of the project in September to dedicate himself to the Italian annexation of Fiume, the Italian Army's air service will carry out the flight in 1920.
- Italian Fascist leader Benito Mussolini begins flying lessons. He will qualify as a pilot in May 1921.
- July 1 – London's first airport is opened, at Hounslow Heath Aerodrome. The facilities include a permanent Customs hall.
- July 2 – The U.S. Navy blimp C-8 explodes while landing at the U.S. Army post at Camp Holabird, Maryland, injuring approximately 80 adults and children who were watching it and shattering windows in homes a mile (1.6 km) away.
- July 2–6 – The British airship R34 begins the first lighter-than-air crossing of the Atlantic Ocean and the first east-to-west Atlantic flight, leaving East Fortune, Scotland, and arriving in Mineola, New York, on July 6. Major E. M. Pritchard parachutes from R34 at Mineola, becoming the first person to arrive in the United States by air from Europe.
- July 10 – World War I fighter ace Morane-Saulnier and chief test pilot Jean Navarre fly a Morane-Saulnier AI repeatedly between two telephone poles and under a wire between them to practice for an unauthorized first-ever flight under the arches of the Arc de Triomphe. This they hope will be a protest against pilots having to parade on foot at the upcoming July 14 Bastille Day World War I victory parade on the Champs-Elysées in Paris. During this practise the two pilots die in a crash.
- July 10–13 – R34 makes a 75-hour return flight from the United States to RNAS Pulham in Norfolk, England, to complete the first two-way crossing of the Atlantic by air.
- July 11 – President Woodrow Wilson signs the Naval Appropriations Act of 1920, which includes funding for the conversion of the collier USS Jupiter into the United States Navy's first aircraft carrier.
- July 14 – Piloting a Fiat BR, the Italian Army's top test pilot, Lieutenant Francesco Breck-Papa, makes the first nonstop flight from Rome to Paris. The 1,200-kilometer (745-mile) flight also is the first nonstop flight between two European capitals. He later flies from Paris to London and then on to Amsterdam.
- July 15 – The British Royal Air Force Airship NS.11 explodes over the North Sea during a mine-hunting patrol and crashes in a ball of fire off Cley next the Sea in Norfolk, killing all nine members of her crew.
- July 18 – French pilot Raymonde de Laroche, the first woman to receive a license, dies along with her co-pilot in the crash of an experimental Caudron airplane at Le Crotoy airfield in France.
- July 21
  - Anthony Fokker founds the Dutch Aircraft Factory at Schiphol.
  - Flying at an altitude of 1,200 feet (370 meters) over the Chicago Loop, the Goodyear Tire and Rubber Company dirigible Wingfoot Air Express catches fire. It crashes into the Illinois Trust and Savings Building, killing three of the five people on board and killing 10 and injuring 27 bank employees in the building. It is the worst dirigible disaster in United States history at the time.
- July 22 – Angered by the insistence of Second Assistant United States Postmaster General Otto Praeger that they fly their routes on time even in zero visibility conditions in order to maintain fixed schedules or be fired – a policy that has resulted in 15 crashes and two fatalities in the previous two weeks alone – U.S. Airmail Service pilots begin a spontaneous strike. After Preager and the United States Post Office Department receive much negative comment in the press, the strike ends in less than a week when the Post Office Department agrees that officials in Washington, D.C., would no longer insist on pilots flying in dangerous weather conditions.
- July 30
  - Eleven Royal Air Force aircraft based at Biorko, Finland, under the command of Squadron Leader D. Grahame Donald stage a dawn raid on the Bolshevik naval base at Kronstadt during the Baltic campaign of the Russian Civil War. After the raid, Donald reports that "a destroyer depot ship disappeared and was not seen again."
  - During a reconnaissance mission by three de Havilland DH.9As of the Royal Air Force's No. 47 Squadron over southern Russia, ground fire punches holes in the fuel tank of the DH.9A of Captain Walter Anderson (pilot) and Lieutenant John Mitchell. Mitchell climbs onto the wing and plugs the holes with his fingers, When another DH.9A is forced down, Anderson and Mitchell land to pick up its crew, with Mitchell holding off Bolshevik cavalry with the Lewis gun in the rear cockpit before again climbing onto the wing to plug the fuel tank's hole with his fingers despite being burned by the aircraft's exhaust. They return safely to base with the rescued crew. Anderson and Mitchell receive the Distinguished Service Order and later the Distinguished Flying Cross for their actions.

=== August ===
- Polish border troops shoot down a giant German Zeppelin-Staaken R.VI bomber making a clandestine night diplomatic flight between Ukraine and Germany. It is the last of only three R.IV bombers lost to enemy action, and the only one shot down by enemy forces after World War I.
- The Women's Royal Air Force contingent in Germany is ordered to close down.
- August 2 – In Italy's first civil aviation disaster, a Caproni Ca.48 airliner crashes near Verona, killing all on board. Sources differ on the death toll, placing it at 14, 15, and 17.
- August 3 – In the Russian Civil War, four Royal Air Force Fairey IIIC seaplanes attack three Bolshevik steamboats on Russia's Lake Onega, causing their crews to panic and allowing Royal Navy submarine chasers to capture them easily.
- August 5 – Italian aviator Antonio Locatelli completes first roundtrip crossing of the Andes, in a single-seater Ansaldo SVA.5
- August 7
  - To protest against pilots having had to parade on foot at the July 14 Bastille Day World War I victory parade on the Champs-Elysées in Paris, French pilot Charles Godefroy flies his Nieuport fighter under the arches of the Arc de Triomphe, the first time this has been accomplished. Although the stunt is unauthorized, French authorities let him off with a warning.
  - Captain Ernest Charles Hoy makes the first aircraft crossing of the Rocky Mountains, flying from Vancouver, British Columbia, Canada, to Calgary, Alberta, Canada, in a Curtis JN-4 "Jenny" in 16 hours and 42 minutes. He travels 1,400 kilometers (869 miles) with a total time in the air of 12 hours 24 minutes.
- August 11
  - The Felixstowe Fury, also known as the Porte Super-Baby, crashes in Plymouth Sound off Plymouth, England, on the eve of its planned flight to South Africa, killing one of its seven crew members.
  - A Farman F.60 Goliath airliner flies eight passengers and a ton of supplies from Paris to Koufa, Senegal, via Casablanca and Mogador, flying more than 4,500 kilometers (2,795 miles).
- August 15 – France reports that 60 percent of its aviators were killed or wounded during World War I.
- August 18 – Royal Air Force aircraft based at Biorko, Finland, under the command of Squadron Leader Grahame Donald bomb and strafe the Bolshevik naval base at Kronstadt in support of the Kronstadt Raid, a Royal Navy night torpedo boat attack on Russian warships there during Baltic campaign of the Russian Civil War.
- August 19 – The United States readopts its pre-January 1918 official national insignia for U.S. Army, U.S. Navy, and U.S. Marine Corps aircraft, a white star centered in a blue circle with a red disc centered within the star. The marking will remain in use until June 1, 1942.
- August 23 – With the Polish head of state, Marshal Józef Piłsudski, looking on, the first aircraft built in a free Poland – a CWL Słowik, a copy of the German Hannover CL.II – crashes during a public ceremonial flight due to faulty bracing wires, killing its two crewmen. The aircraft's constructor, Karol Słowik, is one of the dead.
- August 25 – The first regularly scheduled airline service between London and Paris begins, with the British Aircraft Transport and Travel company flying a de Havilland DH.16 between Hounslow Heath Aerodrome and Paris - Le Bourget Airport.

=== September ===
- September 1 Edmonton Police Department used an aircraft to chase down a murder suspect wanted for murder of a police officer in Edmonton. Former WWI war ace Wop May piloted the craft. An early, if not the earliest, instance of an aircraft used in this way. (Police in Atlantic City, Wyoming, may have used aircraft in a chase a couple months earlier.)
- Aircraft of the Royal Air Force's No. 47 Squadron bomb and machine-gun a Bolshevik fleet of 40 boats assembled at Dubrovka on the Volga River for a bombardment of Tsaritsyn. By the third day of their constant attacks, 11 of the boats have been sunk and the rest flee up the river. Lieutenant Howard Mercer, an observer in one of the aircraft, receives the Distinguished Flying Cross for his actions during the attacks.
- September 11
  - Italian World War I ace Giovanni Ancillotto makes a six-hour nonstop flight from Rome to Warsaw, where Poland's Prime Minister, Ignacy Jan Paderewski, greets him personally upon his arrival. Ultimately, the flight results in Italy selling 75 Ansaldo biplanes to the Polish Air Force.
  - Swiss pilot Walter Mittelholzer flies a photographic flight over Mont Blanc.
- September 19 – Compagnie des Messageries Aériennes (CMA) commences a regular service between Paris and London, using ex-military Breguet 14s.
- September 24 – The 1919 Schneider Trophy race – the first since 1914 – is flown at Bournemouth in the United Kingdom. An Italian Savoia S.13 is the only finisher, but is disqualified for missing a turning buoy. When judges ask pilot Guido Janello to complete another lap, he runs out of fuel.
- September 30
  - The British Aerial Transport Company begins domestic flights between London and Birmingham in a Koolhoven FK.26.
  - Commander Biard, flying the Supermarine route between Southampton and Le Havre, knocks his passenger out during the flight. The man, a Belgian banker named Lowenstein, wanted to open his umbrella to protect himself from the wind and rain.

=== October ===
- October 4 – A new altitude world record of 9,622 meters (31,568 feet) is set by American pilot Rudolph Schroeder, flying a Packard-Le Peré LUSAC-11.
- October 7 – The Dutch airline KLM is formed. From 2007 it will be the world's oldest airline still flying under its original name.
- October 8 – The United States Army Air Service begins a transcontinental air race. By the time Lt Belvin Maynard wins it on October 31, seven airmen have died in the attempt.
- October 11 – Handley Page Transport begins offering the first in-flight meals, on its London-Brussels service. The meals, consisting of a sandwich, fruits and chocolate, are sold at 3 shillings each.
- October 13 – Belgium, Bolivia, Brazil, the British Empire, China, Cuba, Czechoslovakia, Ecuador, France, Greece, Guatemala, Haiti, the Hedjaz, Honduras, Italy, Japan, Liberia, Nicaragua, Panama, Peru, Poland, Portugal, Romania, the Kingdom of Serbs, Croats, and Slovenes, Siam, and Uruguay sign the Paris Convention – formally, the "Convention Relating to the Regulation of Aerial Navigation" – in Paris; Persia later ratifies it without signing it. It establishes that each country has absolute sovereignty over its airspace, that each country must treat all aircraft in its airspace equally regardless of their nationality, that each aircraft must be registered in a country, and that each aircraft carries the nationality of the country in which it is registered. The agreement will take effect in 1922.
- October 16 – The Colombian airline Compañía Colombiana de Navegación Aérea (CCNA) (Colombian Air Navigation Company) is formed.
- October 20 – The French ace pilot Bernard de Romanet, flying a Nieuport-Delage 29v, sets a new world speed record of 268.79 km/h (167.02 mph).
- October 21 – The Great Air Race, between six Australian manned aircraft, from England to Australia commences at Hounslow England.
- October 22 – Flying boat pioneer John Cyril Porte dies suddenly of tuberculosis at Brighton.

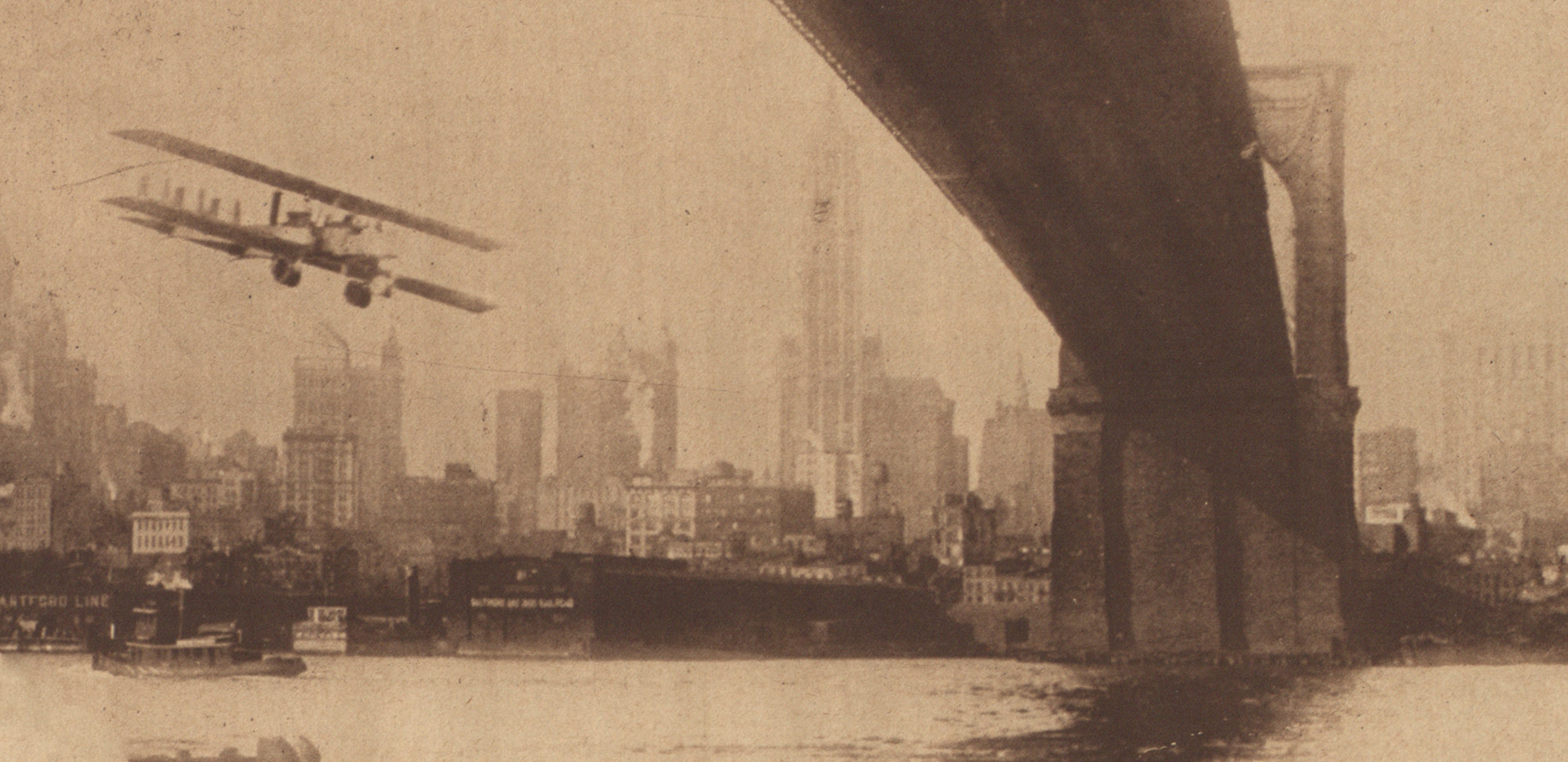
A Caproni biplane flies under the Brooklyn Bridge

=== November ===
- November 1 – West Indies Airways begins service between Key West, and Havana.
- November 5 – Swiss aviation pioneers Alfred Comte and Walter Mittelholzer form Aero-Gesellschaft Comte Mittelholzer & Cie., a predecessor of Ad Astra Aero.
- November 10 – The United States Army Air Service begins the first class at its new Air Service School of Application. The new school, located at McCook Field in Ohio, provides technical training in aeronautical engineering and is the predecessor of the Air Service's first service school, which will be founded in 1920.
- November 12 – Brothers Keith and Ross Macpherson Smith set out on the first flight from England to Australia, flying Vickers Vimy G-EAOU. They will arrive in Darwin, Australia, on December 10 after flying 18,175 km (11,293 mi), winning a prize of A£10,000 (A$890,000 in 2022) from the Government of Australia.
- November 14 – The American Railway Express Company hires a Handley Page V/1500 to carry 1,000 pounds (450 kg) of parcels from New York to Chicago, but the attempt fails due to mechanical problems.
- November 15 – Alameda, California, officials announce that suspected criminals will be subjected to perilous flight to make them confess their crimes.
- November 16 – Captain Henry Wrigley and Sergeant Arthur Murphy set out on the first flight crossing Australia from south to north (see 1920 in aviation and Frank Briggs for the first east to west flights). Wrigley and Murphy fly a Royal Aircraft Factory B.E.2e from Melbourne to Darwin and arrive on December 12, having spent a total of 47 hours in the air.

=== December ===
- Chikuhei Nakajima and Seibi Kawanishi dissolve Japan's first aircraft manufacturing company, the Japan Aeroplane Manufacturing Work Company Ltd. Nakajima buys the company's factory and founds the Nakajima Aircraft Company.
- The U.S. Navy establishes its first aviation unit in the Pacific Ocean west of the United States West Coast when it forms the Pacific Air Detachment at the Pearl Harbor Navy Yard in the Territory of Hawaii.
- December 1 – The Wright-Martin Corporation changes its name to Wright Aeronautical Corporation.
- December 5 – The first airline in Latin America, SCADTA (Sociedad Colombo-Alemana de Transporte Aéreo), is founded in Barranquilla, Colombia. In June 1940 it will merge with SACO (Servicio Aéreo Colombiano) to form the Colombian national airline Avianca.
- December 10 – Second Assistant United States Postmaster General Otto Praeger testifies before the United States House Committee on Post Offices and Post Roads, requesting US$3 million for the creation and operation of airmail routes between New York City and San Francisco, Pittsburgh and Milwaukee, New York City and Atlanta, and St. Louis and Minneapolis, saying that inaugurating these routes would meet the United States Post Office Department goal of "develop[ing] aviation to that point where corporations will come in and run the lines. Then we will make contracts with them as we do with power boat or steamship lines." The United States Congress agrees with the Post office Department's goal, but instead allots Praeger only US$1,375,000 and told him to focus on creating the transcontinental route between New York City and San Francisco.
- December 15 – The Swiss airline Ad Astra Aero S.A. is founded in Zürich, Switzerland.
- December 16 – Construction of the Imperial Japanese Navy aircraft carrier Hōshō begins. She is the second aircraft carrier in the world designed and built as such to be laid down, and will be the first to be completed.
- December 18 – Sir John Alcock is killed in a crash at Rouen, France.
- December 31 – President of Colombia Marco Fidel Suárez sanctions Colombia′s first law dealing with aviation. The law makes aviation companies and everything else in Colombia related to aviation subject to government regulations.

== First flights ==
- Airco DH.16
- de Havilland DH.14 Okapi
- Farman FF 65 Sport
- Nieuport-Delage NiD 30T
- Nieuport 31
- Orenco D
- Potez SEA VII
- Savoia S.16 flying boat
- Sopwith Atlantic
- April or May – Nieuport Nighthawk

=== January ===
- Cantilever Aero Bullet
- de Havilland DH.11 Oxford
- Farman F.60 Goliath

=== February ===
- Pomilio FVL-8
- Siemens-Schuckert D.VI
- February 21 – Thomas-Morse MB-3, first effective U.S.-built fighter

=== April ===
- British Aerial Transport F.K.26 - first purpose-built airliner
- April 30 – Avro 534 Baby

=== May ===
- Avro 536
- Farman Moustique
- Siddeley Deasy S.R.2 Siskin, early version of the Armstrong Whitworth Siskin
- May 10 – Avro Baby
- May 26 – Tarrant Tabor

=== June ===
- June 25 – Junkers F.13, the world's first all-metal commercial airplane

=== July ===
- Vought VE-8
- Westland Limousine
- July 3 – Engineering Division USXB-1A

=== August ===
- August 29 – Avro 539

=== September ===
- Curtiss 18-T-2

=== October ===
- Avro 545, prototype of the Avro 548

=== November ===
- November 10 – Blériot-SPAD S.27

=== December ===
- December 2 – Handley-Page W8
- December 27 – Boeing Model 6, Boeing's first commercial design

== Entered service ==
=== May ===
- Avro 538 with Avro

== Retired ==
=== August ===
- Fairey Campania by Royal Air Force

== Births ==
- January 21 – Eric Brown, British test pilot (d. 2016)
- November 19 – Elizabeth Strohfus, American aviator (d. 2016)
