= S29 =

S29 may refer to:

== Aircraft ==
- Blériot-SPAD S.29, a French sport biplane
- Saab 29 Tunnan, a Swedish fighter aircraft
- Short S.29 Stirling, a British heavy bomber
- Sikorsky S-29, an American biplane airliner

== Rail and transit ==
- S29 (Long Island bus), United States
- S29 (ZVV), a regional railway line of the Zurich S-Bahn, Switzerland
- S29, an Aargau S-Bahn line, Switzerland
- Neppu Station, in Kuromatsunai, Suttsu District, Hokkaido, Japan

== Roads ==
- County Route S29 (California)
- County Route S29 (Bergen County, New Jersey)
- Route 179 (Pennsylvania–New Jersey), partially numbered New Jersey Route S29 until 1953

== Other uses ==
- 40S ribosomal protein S29
- British NVC community S29, a swamps and tall-herb fens community in the British National Vegetation Classification system
- HMS Victorious (S29), a submarine of the Royal Navy
- S29: Do not empty into drains, a safety phrase
- Sulfur-29, an isotope of sulfur
- USS S-29 (SS-134), a submarine of the United States Navy
- S29(star), a star orbiting the supermassive black hole Sagittarius A* at the centre of the galaxy
