= Supermarine Sea Lion I =

British racing flying boat

Sea Lion I
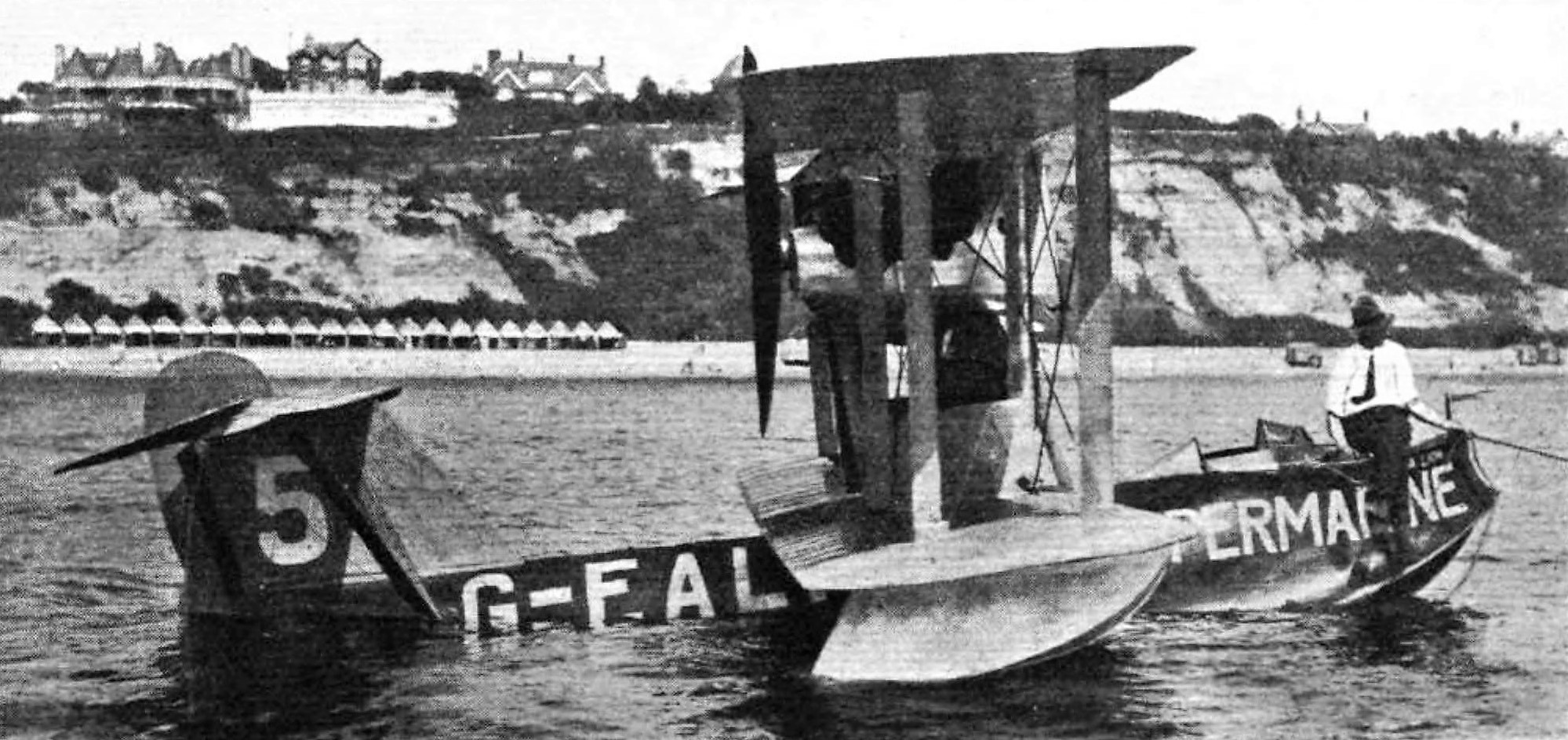
- Sea Lion I moored at the start of the Schneider Trophy race on 10 September 1919

General information
- Type: Racing flying boat
- Manufacturer: Supermarine
- Designer: William Abraham Hargreaves
- Number built: 1

History
- First flight: 1919
- Retired: 1919

The Supermarine Sea Lion I (originally called the Supermarine Sea Lion) was a British racing flying boat designed and built by Supermarine for the Schneider Trophy contest at Bournemouth, England, in September 1919. It was based on a version of the Supermarine Baby, the first single-seat flying boat fighter aircraft to be designed and built in the United Kingdom, that first flew in February 1918.

Registered as G-EALP, the Sea Lion competed successfully against an Avro 539 to win a place as one of the British entrants. On 10 September, the day of the race, thick fog obscured the route and caused the Sea Lion's pilot Basil Hobbs to make an unscheduled landing on the water. Upon taking off, the aircraft's hull was accidentally ripped. Later on during the race, whilst back on the water, the aircraft inverted and sank as a result of the earlier accident. The contest ended in chaos and the results were annulled. The Sea Lion, damaged beyond repair, was scrapped.

== Background and development ==
The Sea Lion I was developed to participate as the British entry in the 1919 Schneider Trophy race, that last taken place in 1914, when Britain had been the victors. The 1919 context was organised by the Royal Aero Club.

The new aircraft was based on a version of the Supermarine Baby, which had been designed to meet Navy Board specification N.1B. The prototype Baby was the first British single-seat flying boat fighter aircraft. Powered by a 200 horsepower (150 kW) Napier Lion engine in pusher configuration, the Baby first flew in February 1918 powered with a 150 horsepower (110 kW) engine.

A second Baby that was built (but never flew) was delivered as spare parts to support testing of the prototype. A third machine (N61) had yet to be assembled when the N.1B programme was abandoned. N61's design was a modified version of the prototype Baby, and Supermarine featured the design in their 1919 brochure. Named the 'A' Single Seater Flying Boat, it was selected to participate in 1919 Schneider contest.

== Design ==
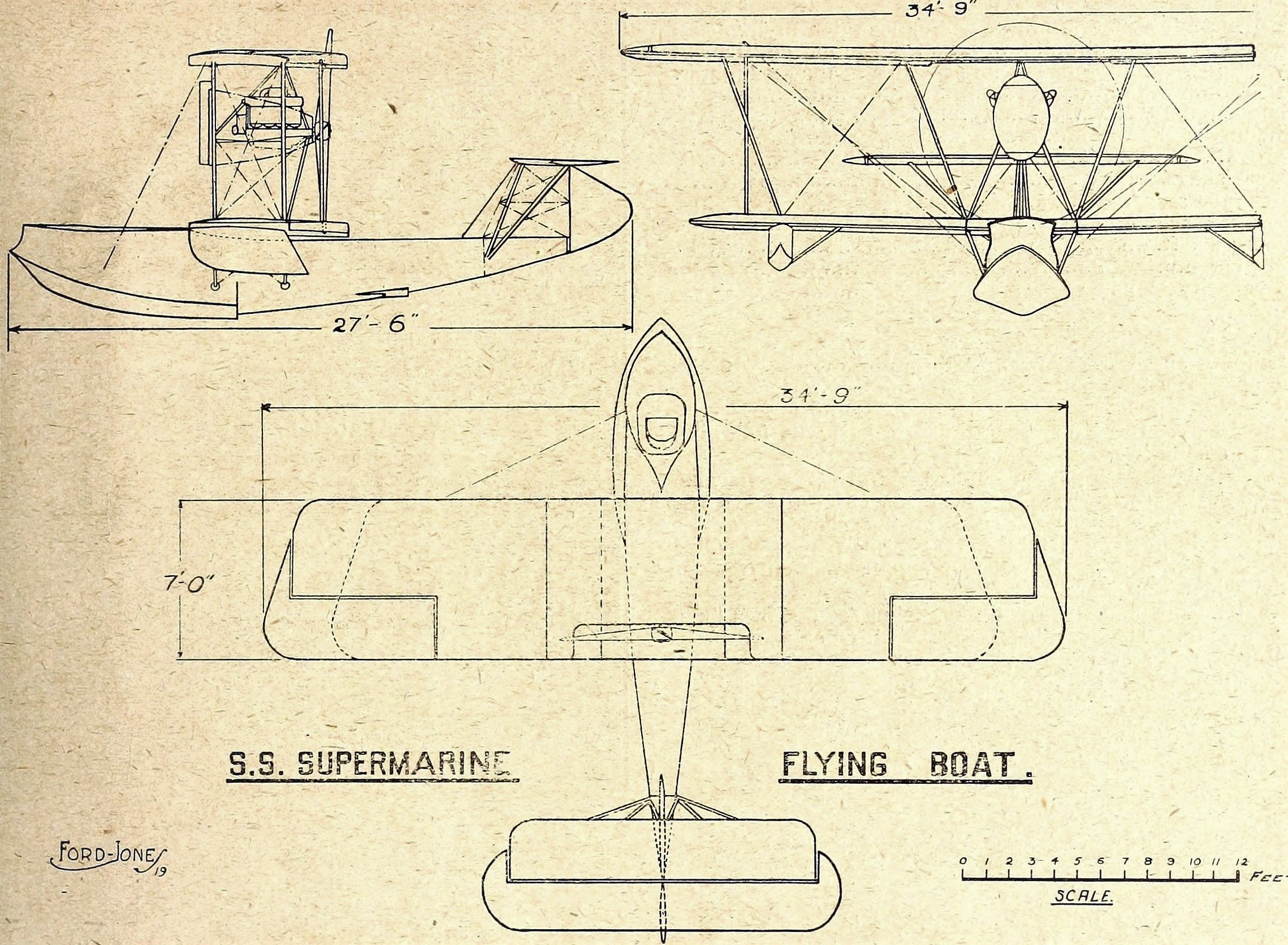
General arrangement drawings for the 'A' Single Seater Flying Boat (The Aeroplane, October 1919)

N61 featured a patented hull design produced by Supermarine's chief designer William Hargreaves in 1918. The hull of the N61, which was in the form originally designed by Linton Hope for the AD Flying Boat, may have been used for the Sea Lion I.

The Sea Lion was designed with a cross section to the aft (rear) that pointed upwards. The nose was designed to deflect spray. The wings were newly-designed with a smaller chord than had been used on the original Baby, modified ailerons on the upper wing, and a rudder and elevators that were both enlarged. The two wings had different span lengths, and the struts connecting them displayed outwards. The Sea Lion was powered with an early example of a Napier Lion engine, loaned by the makers, which had its own mounting. The fin and rudder were larger than that of the Baby.

Reginald Joseph Mitchell, who began working for Supermarine in 1916 and became the company's chief designer after Hargreaves, is likely to have had an involvement in the design of the Sea Lion, and to have helped prepare it for the contest.

== Operational history ==
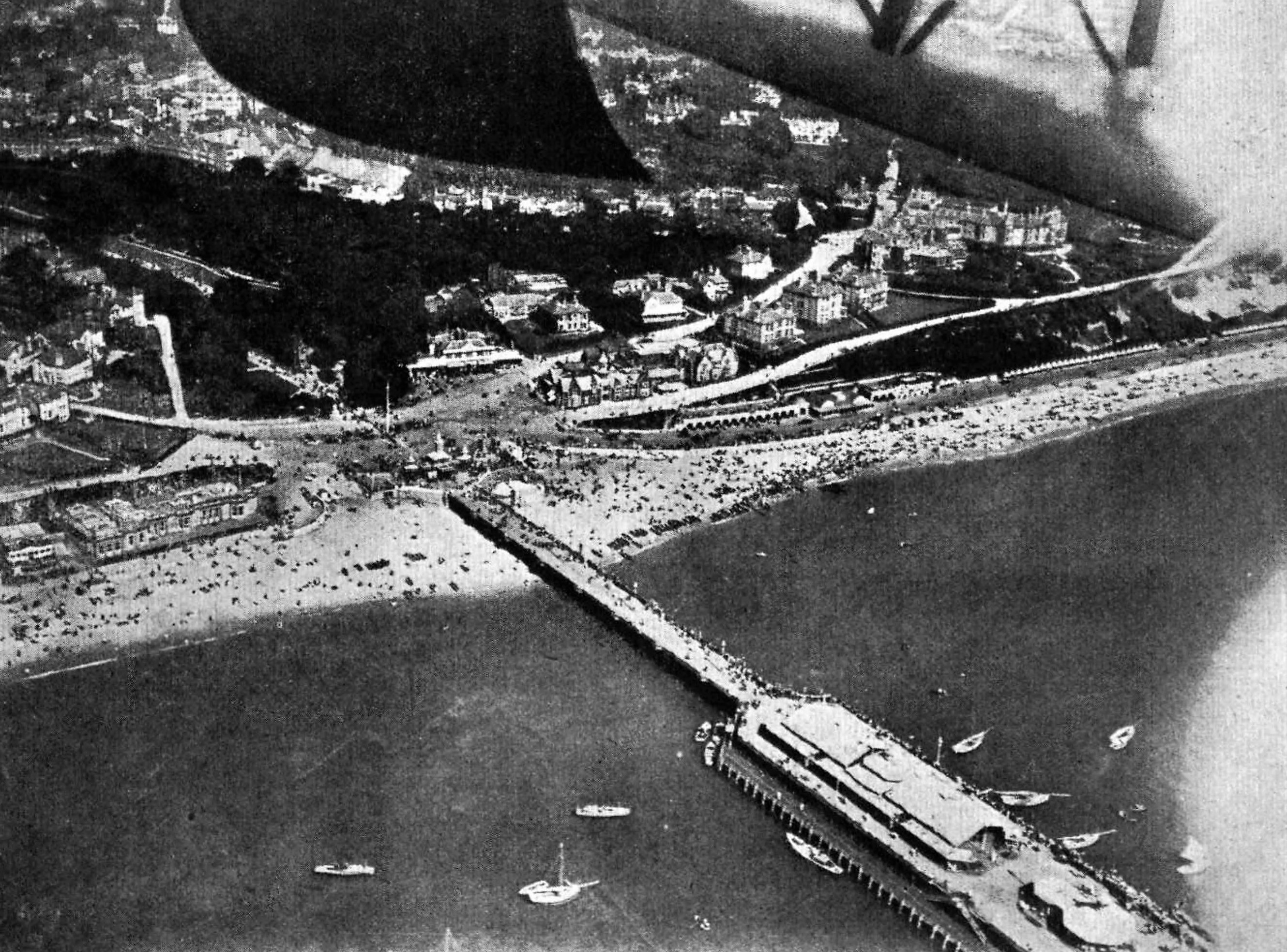
Bournemouth Pier, the starting point for the 1919 Schneider Trophy contest, as viewed on the day of the contest by a Supermarine aeroplane

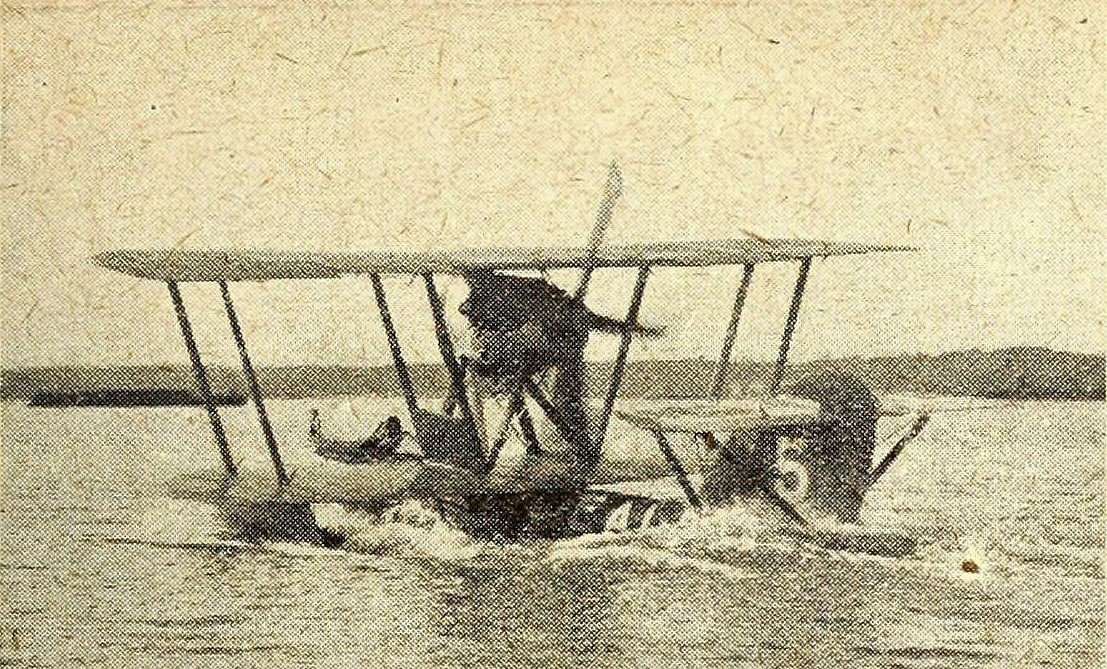
Supermarine Sea Lion I on the water

Registered as racing flying boat G-EALP, the Sea Lion was entered into the 1919 Schneider Trophy race. To decide on which airplanes would take part in the race, a competition had to be held, as each participating country was only allowed to enter three craft, and four British companies had planned to enter. The Sea Lion competed against another biplane, a Avro 539. The Sea Lion took the opportunity to be fitted with a newly-arrived propeller, after the Avro was accidentally damaged before the start of the trials. During the competition, the Sea Lion proved to be slower than the Avro, but was nevertheless selected on the basis of its performance; the Avro was held in reserve.

On 10 September, the day of the contest, Henri Biard of Supermarine took paying passengers around Swanage Bay in the aircraft. The start of the race was delayed until around 5 p.m., because of the foggy conditions.

The Sea Lion arrived at around 1 p.m. and was tied up alongside a Supermarine vessel, Tiddleywinks. Prior to the start of the race, the Sea Lion remained at sea. It thus avoided the damage caused to its rivals after they landed on the beach from Cowes. The undamaged planes set off, but the thick fog obscured the route of the race, and mid-flight the Sea Lion's pilot, Squadron leader Basil D. Hobbs, was forced to land to recalculate his bearings, which he had lost over Swanage Bay. Upon taking off he inadvertently ripped a hole in the Sea Lion's hull after striking flotsam in the water. The damaged aircraft alighted near Bournemouth Pier for the compulsory first lap landing, but inverted with its tail stuck up in the air and sank, and Hobbs was forced to abandon the race. Hobbs was picked up from the site of the wreck, which was towed to Boscombe Pier and returned to Supermarine's works at Woolston, Southampton. The aircraft was found to be beyond repair.

The race ended in chaos due to the fog and the results were annulled. Supermarine's profile was raised from obscurity by the contest, but the loss of the Sea Lion was a blow to the company. The damage to the hull of the aircraft was repaired and in 1921 it was donated to the Science Museum in London, where it was put on display. In 1928, with Supermarine's agreement, the now obsolete hull was broken up.

== Specifications (Sea Lion I) ==
Data from Supermarine Aircraft Since 1914.

General characteristics

- Crew: 1
- Length: 26 ft 4 in (8.03 m)
- Upper wingspan: 35 ft (11 m)
- Lower wingspan: 28 ft 3 in (8.61 m)
- Wing area: 380 sq ft (35 m^{2})
- Empty weight: 2,000 lb (907 kg)
- Gross weight: 2,900 lb (1,315 kg)
- Powerplant: 1 × Napier Lion IA W-12 water-cooled piston engine, 450 hp (340 kW)
- Propellers: 4-bladed wooden fixed-pitch propeller

Performance

- Maximum speed: 147 mph (237 km/h, 128 kn)
- Endurance: 2 hours 30 minutes

== See also ==
Related lists

- List of flying boats and floatplanes

== Sources ==
- Allward, Maurice F. (1988). An Illustrated History of Seaplanes and Flying Boats. New York: Noble & Barnes. ISBN 978-08802-9-286-3.
- Andrews, Charles Ferdinand; Morgan, Eric B. (1981). Supermarine Aircraft since 1914. London: Putnam. ISBN 978-03701-0-018-0.
- Bruce, J. M. (1957). British Aeroplanes 1914–18. London: Putnam. ISBN 978-03700-0-038-1.
- Eves, Edward (2001). Coombs, L. F. E. (ed.). The Schneider Trophy Story. St. Paul, Minnesota: MBI Publishing Company. ISBN 978-07603-1-118-9.
- Lewis, Peter M. H. (1979). The British Fighter since 1912: sixty-seven years of design and development. London: Putnam. ISBN 9780370302508. OCLC 164626682.
- London, Peter (2003). British Flying Boats. Stroud, UK: Sutton Publishing. ISBN 978-0-7509-2695-9.
- Pegram, Ralph (2016). Beyond the Spitfire: The Unseen Designs of R.J. Mitchell. Pegram: The History Press. ISBN 978-0-7509-6515-6.
