= Louis Noël (aviator) =

French aviator and military pilot

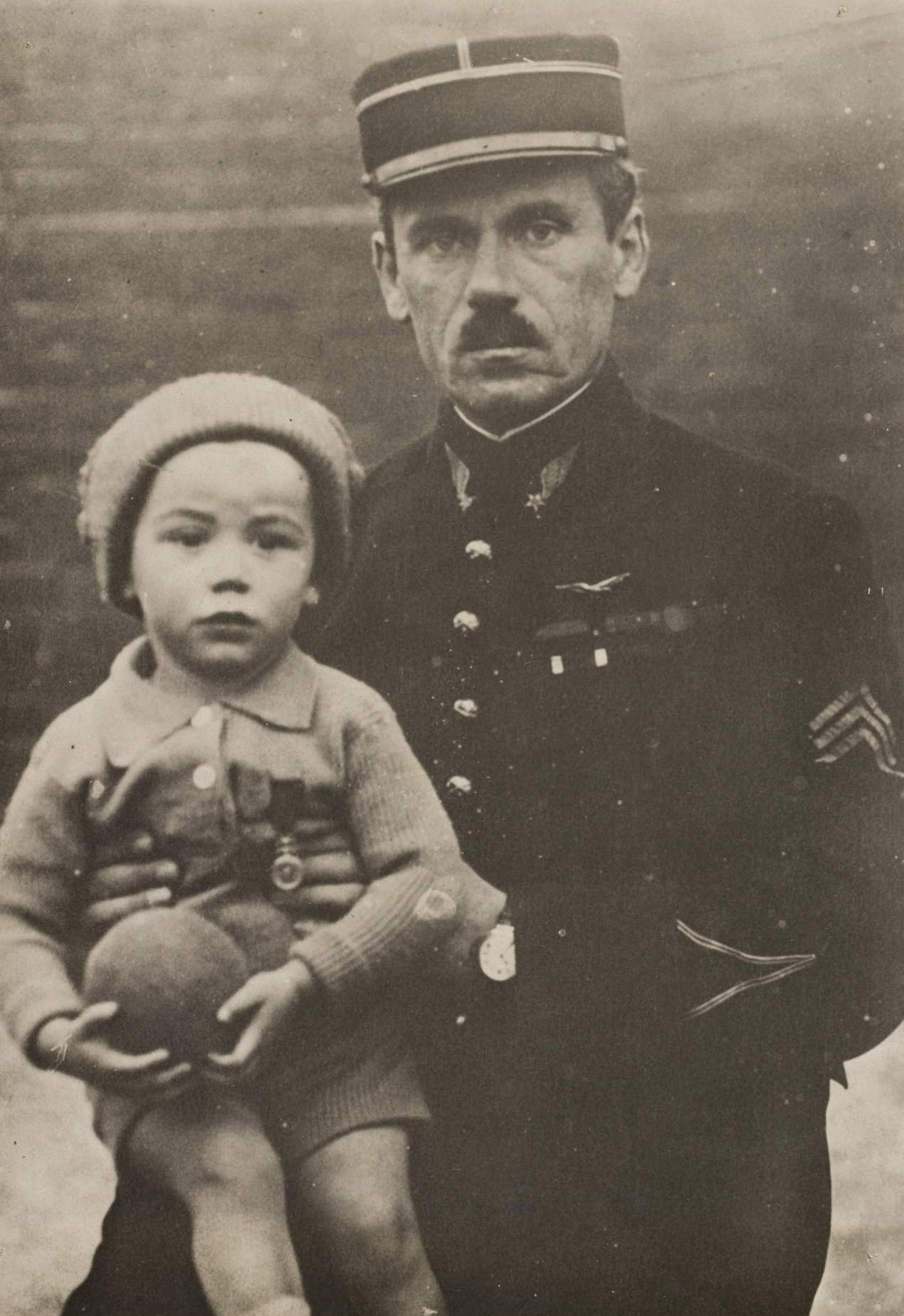
Louis Noël and his son.

Louis Noël was a French aviator and military pilot. He was born in 1872 and died in 1939.

== Aviation career ==
Noël learnt to fly in Great Britain at the Avro school at Brooklands, and was awarded Royal Aero Club pilot's license No. 119 on 17 August 1911. In June 1912 he became an instructor at the Grahame -White flying school at Hendon, where he also gave exhibition flights and took park in flying competitions. He was hired as a reconnaissance pilot in France in 1914, and conducted numerous missions along the Eastern front in World War I, including the Salonica-Bucharest route.

He competed in the 1914 Aerial Derby starting from Hendon Aerodrome with a Morane-Saulnier monoplane equipped with an 80 hp Le Rhone engine. Although he completed the course in the fastest time, he was disqualified for missing one of the control points.

In 1917 he served with Escadrille M.F. 88 at Salonica. He would receive the Croix de Guerre, the Médaille Militaire, the Legion of Honour, and the Gold Medal of the Aero Club of France.

Noël made a speech recalling a "special mission" he flew with Robert de Flers over Romania during the war, at de Flers' funeral at the Père Lachaise Cemetery in 1928.
