= Avro 539 =

General information
- Type: Racing biplane
- National origin: United Kingdom
- Manufacturer: Avro
- Status: Destroyed 13 July 1921
- Number built: 1

History
- First flight: 29 August 1919

The Avro 539 was a British single-seat racing biplane built by Avro for the 1919 Schneider Trophy.

== Development ==
In August 1919, Avro designed and built a floatplane to compete in the 1919 Schneider Trophy race, which was to be held in Bournemouth in September. The Avro 539 was a small, single-seat tractor biplane, with a stubby fuselage and twin wooden floats. Its unstaggered single-bay wings had dihedral on the lower wings and curved wing tips. It was powered by a 240 hp (180 kW) Siddeley Puma engine driving a two-bladed propeller and had a single open cockpit for the pilot aft of the wings. It was first flown at Avro's Hamble works on 29 August 1919. During early test flights, the aircraft's floats were damaged by floating debris, requiring repair, and Avro used this opportunity to modify the aircraft's tail surfaces, fitting a balanced rudder and elongated fin, and displaying the aircraft's registration, G-EALG.

As each country participating in the trophy could only enter three aircraft, and four British aircraft had been proposed, so elimination trials were carried out on 8 September, which resulted in the Sopwith Schneider, Fairey III and Supermarine Sea Lion being selected to take part in the race, with the Avro being nominated as reserve aircraft. The race was held on 10 September 1919, but was ruined by fog and declared void.

The aircraft was modified as a landplane with a smaller fin and a fixed conventional landing gear, and took part in the Aerial Derby at Brooklands on 24 July 1920. A fuel leak caused the pilot, D. G. Westgarth-Heslam, to abandon the race, force-landing the Avro at Abridge, Essex. The race was won by a Martinsyde Semiquaver. The aircraft was again rebuilt for the 1921 Aerial Derby, to be held at Hendon on 16 July that year, as the Avro 539B. The Puma engine was replaced by a 450 hp (340 kW) Napier Lion in a streamlined cowling, with a pair of radiators mounted on the side of the fuselage replacing the original frontal radiator. A stronger undercarriage, with rubber shock absorbers was fitted, and the rear fuselage was of planked plywood. The rebuilt aircraft was allocated the new registration G-EAXM. The 539B made its first flight in that form on 13 July 1921, but Westgarth-Heslam overshot on landing, with the aircraft crashing into a railway cutting, wrecking the aircraft and badly injuring Westgarth-Heslam.

== Variants ==
Avro 539A
Schneider Trophy floatplane with a 240 hp (180 kW) Siddeley Puma engine, later modified as a landplane, rebuilt as the Avro 539A after a forced landing.
Avro 539B
539A rebuilt with a 450 hp (340 kW) Napier Lion engine.

== Specifications (539A floatplane) ==
Data from

General characteristics

- Crew: one
- Length: 21 ft 4 in (6.5 m)
- Wingspan: 25 ft 6 in (7.77 m)
- Height: 9 ft 9 in (2.97 m)
- Wing area: 195 sq ft (18.1 m^{2})
- Empty weight: 1,670 lb (758 kg)
- Gross weight: 2,119 lb (961 kg)
- Powerplant: 1 × Siddeley Puma , 240 hp (179 kW)

== See also ==
- Schneider Trophy

Related lists

- List of flying boats and floatplanes
