= Bristol Bullet =

Type 32 Bullet

General information
- Type: racing biplane
- National origin: United Kingdom
- Manufacturer: Bristol Aeroplane Company
- Number built: 1

History
- Introduction date: 1920
- First flight: 1920
- Retired: 1924

The Bristol Type 32 Bullet was a British biplane racing aircraft. It was designed in 1919 by Frank Barnwell as a high-speed testbed for the Jupiter engine being developed in Bristol by Roy Fedden for the Cosmos Engineering company, and also to publicise the company's name by participating in air races.

The Bullet was a conventional single-seat biplane with single-bay wings of thin low-drag section braced by N struts. The fuselage was a wooden four-longeron structure faired to a circular section.

The finished airframe, fitted with a dummy engine, was exhibited at the Paris Aero Salon in December 1919 but an engine did not become available until June 1920, when the aircraft was first flown, piloted by Cyril Uwins. It was entered in the Aerial Derby in July of that year; its performance in the race was disappointing, and it was substantially modified, with a new cowling, a large hemispherical spinner, and wings of greatly reduced span and gap. By the time the modifications were complete Cosmos had gone bankrupt and the aero-engine business had been bought by Bristol, and the Bullet was used for the task of accumulating the necessary flight hours for the Jupiter to gain Air Ministry type approval, a job it shared with the Bristol Badger.

The modified Bullet's maximum speed was increased to 170 mph (270 km/h), and it finished fourth in the 1921 Aerial Derby at an average speed of 141 mph (227 km/h). A more powerful 380 hp (280 kW) Jupiter II engine was fitted, and, piloted by Rollo A. de Haga Haig, came second in the 1922 Aerial Derby, at an average speed of 145 mph (233 km/h), beaten only by the Gloster Mars (which had also won the 1921 race It was entered for the 1923 Aerial Derby and Kings Cup races, but following the death of Leslie Foot, the intended pilot, flying the Bristol M.1D in the Grosvenor Cup race, Bristol withdrew from racing and the Bullet was retired, and eventually scrapped in 1924.

== Specifications (As first built) ==
Data from

General characteristics

- Crew: one
- Length: 24 ft 1 in (7.34 m)
- Wingspan: 31 ft 2 in (9.51 m)
- Height: 9 ft 8 in (2.95 m)
- Wing area: 295 sq ft (27.41 m^{2})
- Empty weight: 1,800 lb (816 kg)
- Gross weight: 2,200 lb (998 kg)
- Powerplant: 1 × Bristol Jupiter nine-cylinder radial piston engine , 450 hp (336 kW)

Performance

- Maximum speed: 155 mph (249 km/h, 135 kn)
