= Aerial Derby =

Air race in the United Kingdom

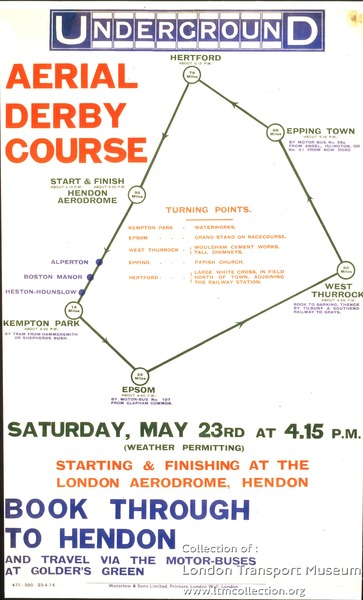
London Underground poster for the 1914 Aerial Derby

The Aerial Derby was an air race in the United Kingdom sponsored by the Daily Mail in which the competitors flew a circuit around London. It was first held in 1912, with subsequent races in 1913 and 1914. Suspended during the First World War, the event was revived in 1919 with a "Victory Aerial Derby". Further races were held in 1920, 1921, 1922 and 1923. Although a race was scheduled for 1924, there were insufficient entries and the event was cancelled.

== 1912 ==
The first race, held on Saturday 8 June, consisted of a single circuit of an 81 mi (130 km) course, starting and finishing at Hendon Aerodrome with control points at Kempton Park, Esher, Purley and Purfleet. At these contestants had to fly low enough for the judges to see the race number of their aircraft. The first prize was £250 and a gold cup.

The first competition was the subject of enormous public interest, with around 45,000 people paying to view the start and finish at Hendon and enormous crowds gathering along the route.

Sopwith was the first contestant to finish; he was then disqualified for having missed the control point at Purley. He appealed against the judgement, and was later pronounced the winner: visibility had been poor, and Sopwith had in fact passed well outside the marker, unseen by the judges.

Fifteen aviators were expected to start the race but due to the bad weather only seven started:

Pilot	Aircraft / Engine	Time	Speed	Notes
S. V. Sippé	Hanriot; 50 hp Gnome			Did not finish owing to engine trouble
Thomas Sopwith	70 hp Blériot XI-2; 70 hp Gnome	1h 23m 8.4s		
Gustav Hamel	70 hp Blériot XI-2; 70 hp Gnome	1h 38m 46s		Carried Miss Eleanor Trehawke Davies as passenger
P. Verrier	Maurice Farman; 70 hp Renault			Carried the Daily Mirror photographer Ivor Castle as passenger. Did not finish owing to losing way in cloud.
William Barnard Rhodes-Moorhouse	Radley-Moorhouse; 50 hp Gnome	2h 0m 22s		Second prize of £100
James Valentine	Bristol Prier monoplane 50 hp Gnome	2h 26m 39s		Third prize of £50
Maurice Guillaux	Caudron monoplane 45 hp Anzani			Ran out of fuel just before finish while leading the race.

== 1913 ==
The second competition was held on Saturday 20 September, and was flown over a slightly longer 94 mi (151 km) course, alterations having been made because the original route crossed areas prohibited under the recently passed Air Navigation Order. As well as the Daily Mail trophy and £200 prize a trophy and three prizes of £100, £70 and £25 were given by Shell for the winner of a handicap competition.

Entrants and results

Pilot	Aircraft	Handicap	Time	Speed	Notes
Gustav Hamel	Morane-Saulnier; 80 hp Gnome	Scratch	1h 15m 49s	76 mph (122 km/h)	Overall winner
Harold Barnwell	Martinsyde; 120 hp Austro-Daimler	6m 39s	1h 18m 44s	72.5 mph (116.7 km/h)	
Harry Hawker	Sopwith; 80 hp Gnome	12m 10s	1h 25m 24s	67 mph (108 km/h)	
F. P. Raynham	Avro 504; 80 hp Gnome	11m 43s	1h 26m 1s	66.5 mph (107.0 km/h)	
R. Slack	Morane-Saulnier; 80 hp Rhône	5m 4s	1h 29m 59s	62.5 mph (100.6 km/h)	
B. C. Hucks	Blériot; 80 hp Gnome	19m 0s	1h 30m 53s	63 mph (101 km/h)	Winner of the Shell trophy for the handicap competition
W. L. Brock	Blériot; 80 hp Gnome	19m 57s	1h 32m 29s	61.5 mph (99.0 km/h)	
P. Marty	Morane-Saulnier; 50 hp Rhône	10m 46s	1h 35m 51s	59.5 mph (95.8 km/h)	
P. Verrier	Henry Farman; 80 hp Gnome	29m 8s	1h 45m 7s	54 mph (87 km/h)	

== 1914 ==
Originally to be held on 23 May, but postponed to 6 June due to poor weather conditions. Weather conditions on the day it was held were little better, with some contestants failing to start because they had been unable to fly to Hendon on the day. Won by Walter Brock.

Entrants and results

Competition No.	Pilot	Aircraft	Handicap	Time	Speed	Notes
1	Filip Bjorklund	Blériot; 50 hp Gnome Omega	40m 51s			Retired, landing at Epsom.
2	W. Birchenough	M. Farman; 70 hp Gnome	48m 21s			Retired, landing in Richmond Park
5	R. H. Carr	H. Farman; 80 hp Gnome	33m 34s	1h 46m 27		
6	P. Verrier	H. Farman; 80 hp Gnome	36m 51s	1h 49m 50s		
8	L. A. Strange	Blériot; 80 hp Gnome	29m 46s			Retired, landing at West Wickham
9	J. Alcock	H. Farman; 100 hp Sunbeam	34m 51s			Retired
12	W. L. Brock	Morane-Saulnier G 80 hp Gnome	20m 24s	1h 18m 54s		Overall winner
13	Louis Noël	Morane-Saulnier G 80 hp Gnome	20m 54s	1h 15m 9s		Disqualified for missing two of the control points owing to poor visibility
14	Lord Carbery	Morane-Saulnier G 80 hp Le Rhône	17m 6s			
18	Howard Pixton	Sopwith Tabloid; 100 hp Gnome	6m 20s			Retired
15	R.H. Barnwell	Sopwith Tabloid; 100 hp Gnome	scratch			Retired

== 1919 ==
Dubbed the "Victory Aerial Derby" in reference to the Allied victory in World War I and held on 21 June over the same course as the 1914 event, but due to the increased speed of aircraft over two circuits rather than one. Won by G. Gathergood flying a D.H.4R with M.C. Hammersley flying an Avro Baby winning the handicap race.

Entrants and results

Competition No.	Pilot	Aircraft	Handicap	Time	Speed	Notes
1	Clifford Prodger	BAT Bantam; 170 hp ABC Wasp	16m 0s			Did not finish
2	P. R. T. Chamberlayne	Grahame-White Bantam; 80 hp Le Rhône				Did not finish
3	C. Draper	B.A.T. Bantam; 200 hp ABC. Wasp	13m 20s	1h 37m 7s	116.78 mph (187.94 km/h)	Modified, with reduced -span lower wings.
4	G. L. P. Henderson	Avro 504; 110 hp Le Rhone	57m 0s	2h 30m 45.2s	75.22 mph (121.05 km/h)	Henderson had originally entered a Martinsyde F.4, but was unable to get permission from the War Office to use this machine.
5	R. H. Carr	Grahame-White Bantam; 80 hp Le Rhône				Did not finish
7	G. Gathergood	D.H.4R; 450 hp Napier Lion)	Scratch	1h 27m 42s	129.34 mph (208.15 km/h)	Gathergood's D.H.4 had been considerably modified, with a reduced-span lower wing.
8	Marcus D. Manson	DH.4; 375 hp Rolls-Royce Eagle)	9m 30s	1h 36m 41s	117.39 mph (188.92 km/h)	
9	Howard Saint	DH.9; 240 hp Siddeley Puma	23m 30s	1h 51m 55s	101.43 mph (163.24 km/h)	
10	Robert Nisbet	Martinsyde F.4; 250 hp Rolls-Royce Falcon	4m 0s	1h 31m 3.4s	124.61 mph (200.54 km/h)	
11	L. R. Tait-Cox	Nieuport L.C.1; 320 hp ABC Dragonfly	4m 0s			Did not finish
12	C. H. C. Smith	Bristol Monoplane; 110 hp Le Rhône	29m 0s			Did not finish
14	H. A. Hammersley	Avro Baby; 35 hp Green	1h 25m 0s	2h 41m 23s	70.3 mph (113.1 km/h)	Winner of handicap competition
15	C. Turner	BAT Commercial; 375 hp Rolls-Royce Eagle				
16	C. R. Vaughan	BAT Bantam; 170 hp ABC Wasp				
17	H. Hawker	Sopwith Snapper; 320 hp ABC Dragonfly				Did not start, as permission to fly the aircraft was not given by the War Office
18	J. Alcock	Vickers				Did not start

== 1920 ==
No longer sponsored by the Daily Mail, for the 1920 event the prizes were given by the Royal Aero Club. These were £500 for the overall winner, with three prizes of £250, £100 and £50 for the first three places in the handicap competition. Held on 24 July over a slightly amended course of 102.5 mi (165.0 km), with Brooklands taking the place of Kempton Park. The overall winner was F. T. Courtney, and the handicap competition was won by H. A. Hammersley.

Entrants and results'

Competition No.	Pilot	Aircraft	Handicap	Time	Speed	Notes
1	Bert Hinkler	Avro Baby; 35 hp Green	1h 41m	2h 45m 46s	72.39 mph (116.50 km/h)	
2	H. A. Hammersley	Avro Baby; 35 hp Green	1hr 35min	2h 32m 6s	78.89 mph (126.96 km/h)	Winner of handicap competition
3	Leth Jensen	Blériot-SPAD S.29; 80 hp Le Rhône	45m			Did not start
4	F. S. Cotton	DH 14A; 450 hp Napier Lion	41.5m			Did not finish
5	W. L. Jordan	Sopwith Snipe; 200 hp Bentley BR.2	28m	47m 6s	111.29 mph (179.10 km/h)	Entered by Francis McClean
6	W. H. Longton	Sopwith Snipe; 200 hp Bentley BR.2	28m			Did not finish
7	J. S. T. Fall	Sopwith Snipe; 200 hp Bentley BR.2	28m			Did not finish
8	D. G. Westgarth-Heslam	Avro "Schneider"; 230 hp Siddeley Puma	19m 30s			Did not finish
10	J.H. James	Nieuport Nieuhawk; 320 hp ABC Dragonfly	12m	46m 6s	130.15 mph (209.46 km/h)	
11	R.H. Nisbet	Martinsyde F.6; 300 hp Hispano-Suiza	11m 30s	46m 43.4s	128.43 mph (206.69 km/h)	
12	T. O'B. Hubbard	Martinsyde F.4; 300 hp Hispano-Suiza	10m 30s min	48m 19.8s	124.13 mph (199.77 km/h)	
13	H. Hawker	Sopwith Rainbow; 320 hp ABC Dragonfly	10m 30s	42m 12s	142.18 mph (228.82 km/h)	Disqualified for not crossing the finish line properly
14	C.F. Uwins	Bristol Bullet; 450 hp Bristol Jupiter	7m 30s	44m 4s	136.15 mph (219.11 km/h)	
15	F. T. Courtney	Martinsyde Semiquaver; 300 hp Hispano-Suiza	1 min	38m 47.2s	154.70 mph (248.97 km/h)	Overall winner. Originally to have been flown by Fred Raynham, prevented from taking part by an injury.
16	L.R. Tait-Cox	Nieuport Goshawk; 320 hp ABC Dragonfly	Scratch			Did not finish owing to engine trouble.

== 1921 ==
Again sponsored by the Royal Aero Club and held on 16 July with a prize of £500 for the overall winner and three prizes of £200, £100, and £50 for the first three places in the handicap competition.

Entrants and results

Competition No.	Pilot	Aircraft	Handicap	Time	Speed	Notes
1	T. Tully	Avro Baby; 35 hp Green	1h 15m 42s			Retired during second lap
2	Bert Hinkler	Avro Baby; 35 hp Green	1h 7m 24s			Did not finish, coming down at Sidcup during his first lap
3	A.H. Curtiss	B.E.2e; 90 hp RAF 1a				Did not start, owing to dissatisfaction with his handicap allowance
4	D.L. Forestier-Walker	Sopwith Pup; 80 hp Le Rhone	37m 6s			Retired, landing at Hendon after first lap because he felt ill.
5	A.S. Butler	Bristol Tourer; 240 hp Siddeley Puma	37m 6s	1h 52m 1.2s	107.12 mph (172.39 km/h)	Third in handicap competition
6	L.R. Tait-Cox	Avro; 180 hp Wolseley Viper	33 min 30 sec	1h 57m 3.2s	35.01 mph (56.34 km/h)	
7	H.S.Broad	Sopwith Camel; 130 hp Clerget	30m 3s	2h 5m 30s	107.12 mph (172.39 km/h)	
8	W.H. Longton	S.E.5a; 220 hp Wolseley Viper	28m 6s	1h 40m 25	119.50 mph (192.32 km/h)	Third overall and second in handicap
9	F.J. Ortweiler	S.E.5a; 220 hp Wolseley Viper	28m 6s	2h 4m 52.8s	123.99 mph (199.54 km/h)	disqualified for not rounding markers at Hendon properly
10	J. Noakes	Nieuport Nighthawk; 300 hp ABC Dragonfly	17m 34s			Did not finish
11	C. Draper	BAT Bantam; 200 hp ABC Wasp				
12	S.H.Long	Martinsyde F.4a; 220 hp Wolseley Viper				
14	H.Hawker	Nieuport Goshawk; 300 hp ABC Dragonfly				Died in crash while practising for race
15	C.F. Uwins	Bristol Bullet; 400 hp Bristol Jupiter	7m 42s	1h 32m 34.6s	141.38 mph (227.53 km/h)	Second overall
16	F.T. Courteney	Alula Monoplane; 300 hp Hispane Suiza				Did not start
17	J.H. James	Gloster Mars; 450 hp Napier Lion	4m 42s	1h 18m 10s	163.34 mph (262.87 km/h)	Won both overall and handicap
18	Bernard de Romanet	De Monge V 300 hp Hispane Suiza				Did not start
19	D.G Westgarth-Heslam	Avro 539; 450 hp Napier Lion				Did not start (aircraft destroyed in crash before race)
20	J. Sadi-Lecointe	Nieuport; 300 hp Hispane Suiza				Did not start

== 1922 ==
For the 1922 competition, held on 7 August, the start and finish point was transferred to Croydon Aerodrome, with the control points at Brooklands, Hertford, Epping and West Thurrock making a circuit of just under 100 mi (160 km). The competition was won by L. R. Tait-Cox flying a Gloucester Mars I and the handicap competition by L. L. Carter flying a Bristol M.1D.

Entrants and results

Competition No.	Pilot	Aircraft and engine	Handicap	Time	Speed	Notes
1	R. H. Stocken	Martinsyde F.4; 300 hp Hispano-Suiza				
2	H. H. Perry	S.E.5a; 200 hp Wolseley Viper				
3	J. H. James	Gloucester Mars I 450 hp Napier Lion				
4	L. R. Tait-Cox	Gloucester Mars III; 200 hp Bentley BR2		1hr 6min 48.4sec	177.85 mph (286.22 km/h)	Overall winner
5	L. L. Carter	Bristol M.1D; 100 hp Bristol Lucifer	47min 9 sec	1hr 50min 0.4sec	107.85 mph (173.57 km/h)	Won handicap competition
6	R. A. deHaig	Bristol Bullet; 400 hp Bristol Jupiter				
7	F. P. Raynham	Martinsyde F.6; 180 hp Wolsley Viper				
8	A. S. Butler	de Havilland DH.37; 275 hp Rolls-Royce Falcon				Withdrew after completing first lap
9	Bert Hinkler	Avro Baby; 35 hp Green Engine Co	1hr 22min 34sec	2hr 35min 4sec	76.6 mph (123.3 km/h)	
10	C. F. Uwins	Bristol Racer; 400 hp Bristol Jupiter				Did not start

== 1923 ==
Held on 6 August, with the course slightly modified by eliminating the Epping control point.

Entrants and results

Competition no.	Pilot	Aircraft and engine	Handicap	Time	Speed	Notes
1	"A. T. Renno" (Dr. W. Reid)	S.E.5a; 70 hp Renault	1h 36m 2s	2h 51m 34s	71 mph (114 km/h)	
2	Bert Hinkler	Avro Baby; 35 hp Green	1h 24m 14s			Did not finish
3	J. R. King	Sopwith Gnu; 110 hp Le Rhone	1h 13m 17s	2h 27m 51s	86 mph (138 km/h)	
4	J. W. Woodhouse	Boulton Paul P.9; 90 hp RAF 1a	1h 10m 59s	2h 11m 1s	91.25 mph (146.85 km/h)	Third place in handicap competition
5	W. M. W. Thomas	Avro 504K; 130 hp Clerget	57m 26s			Did not start
6	H. A. Hammersley	Avro Viper; 200 hp Wolseley Viper	51m 38s	1h 49m 56s	109.5 mph (176.2 km/h)	Winner of handicap competition
7	F. P. Raynham	Martinsyde F.6; 200 hp Wolseley Viper	38m 53s	1h 40m 5s	120 mph (190 km/h)	
8	H. Hemming	De Havilland DH.37; 275 hp Rolls-Royce Falcon	38m 1s			Did not finish
9	H. H. Perry	De Havilland DH.9a; 350 hp Rolls-Royce Eagle	33m 54s	1h 33m 40s	128 mph (206 km/h)	Second in handicap competition
10	F. T. Courteney	De Havilland DH.9a; 450 hp Napier Lion	20m 37s			Did not finish
11	C. D. Barnard	De Havilland DH.9; 450 hp Napier Lion	18m 37s	1h 21m 21s	148 mph (238 km/h)	
12	W. H. Longton	Sopwith Rainbow; 400 hp Bristol Jupiter	7m 4s	1h 39m 9s	164.5 mph (264.7 km/h)	
13	L. L. Carter	Gloster Mars; 450 hp Napier Lion	Scratch	1h 2m 23s	192.4 mph (309.6 km/h)	Overall winner

== 1924 ==
The 1924 competition was to have been held at Lympne aerodrome in Kent, the contestants to fly four laps of a 50 mi (80 km) circuit, but the event was cancelled due to there being too few high speed entrants.
