= Blériot-SPAD S.29 =

S.29
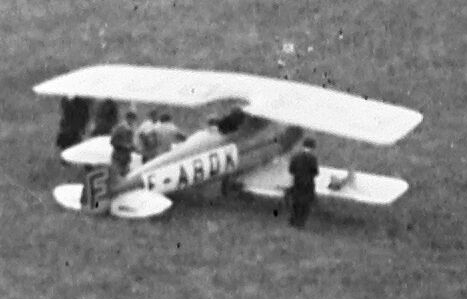
- A Blériot-SPAD S.29 in October 1920.

General information
- Type: Sports aircraft
- National origin: France
- Manufacturer: Blériot-SPAD
- Designer: André Herbemont
- Number built: 5

History
- First flight: January 1920
- Developed from: SPAD XV

The Blériot-SPAD S.29 was a sport aircraft produced in 1919 by Blériot-SPAD.

== Design and development ==
The Blériot-SPAD S.29 was a two-seat single-bay biplane, with a slightly swept upper wing and a straight lower wing, with the wings connected by a single strut on each side. Ailerons were fitted to the lower wing only. The fuselage was a circular section wooden monocoque structure, with pilot and passenger seated in tandem in a single cockpit. It was powered by a 60 kilowatts (80 hp) Le Rhône 9C rotary engine driving a two-bladed propeller fitted with a large hemispherical spinner, mounted on ball-bearings so that it did not rotate with the propeller, possibly a precaution against the spinner disintegrating due to centrifugal force.

== Specifications ==
Data from Flight

General characteristics

- Crew: 1
- Capacity: 1 passenger
- Length: 7.32 m (24 ft 0 in)
- Wingspan: 9.78 m (32 ft 1 in)
- Height: 2.39 m (7 ft 10 in)
- Empty weight: 848 kg (1,870 lb)
- Gross weight: 2,770 kg (6,107 lb)
- Powerplant: 1 × Le Rhône 9C 9-cyl. air-cooled rotary piston engine, 60 kW (80 hp)

Performance

- Maximum speed: 166 km/h (103 mph, 90 kn)
- Endurance: 3 hr
