= Avro Baby =

Baby
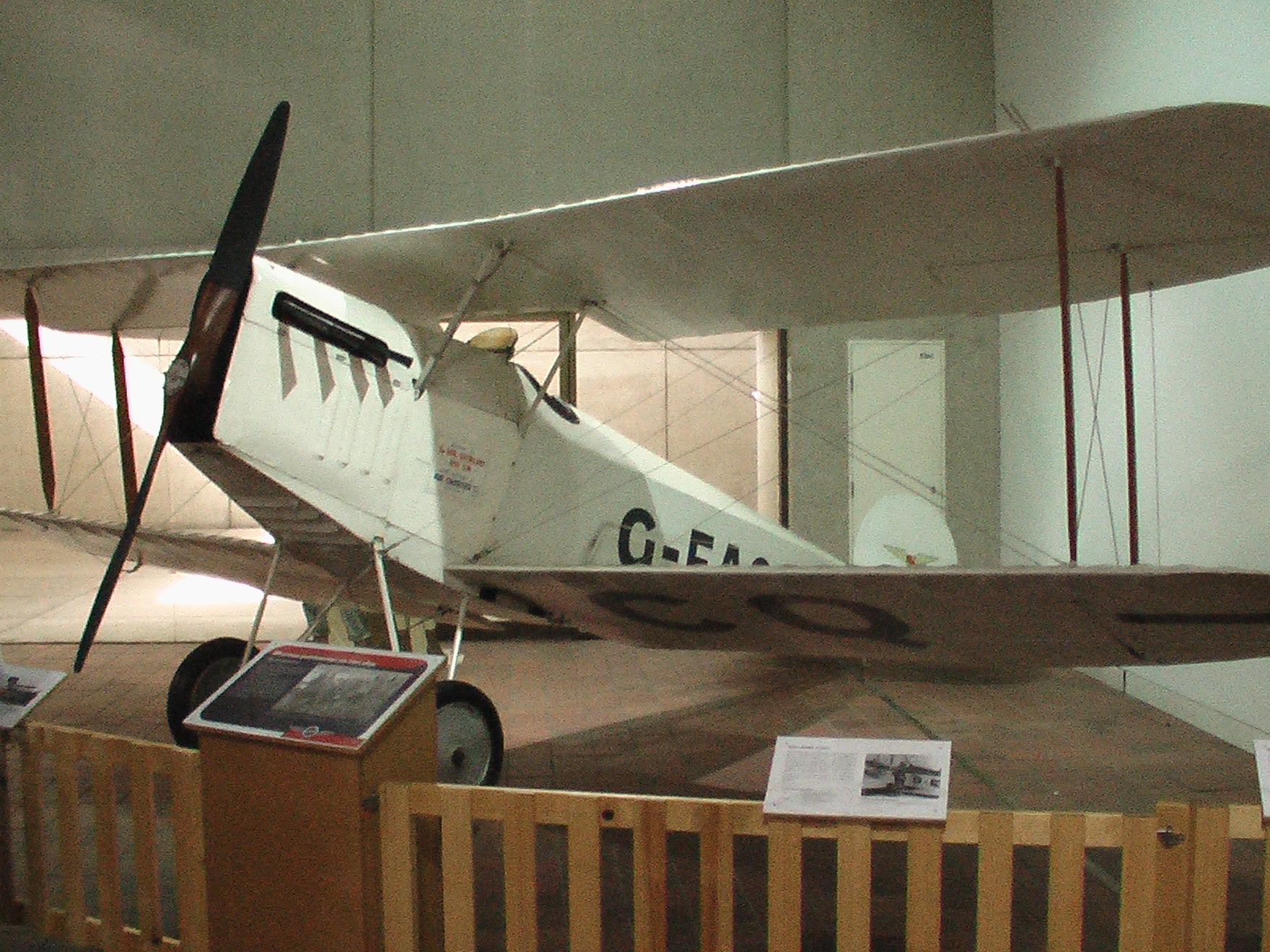
- Bert Hinkler's Avro Baby in the Queensland Museum, Brisbane

General information
- Type: Sports plane
- Manufacturer: Avro
- Designer: Roy Chadwick
- Number built: 9

History
- First flight: 30 April 1919

The Avro 534 Baby (originally named the "Popular") was a British single-seat light sporting biplane built shortly after the First World War.

== Development ==
The Avro Baby was a single-bay biplane of conventional configuration with a wire-braced wooden structure covered in canvas. It had equal-span, unstaggered wings which each carried two pairs of ailerons. Initially, the aircraft was finless and had a rudder of almost circular shape. There were later variations of this. The main undercarriage was a single-axle arrangement and with a tailskid.

The first Babies were powered by a water-cooled inline Green C.4 engine of pre-1914 design that had previously been installed in the Avro Type D, though thoroughly remodelled postwar by the Green Engine Co. It produced 35 hp (26 kW). Most of the later Babies also used this engine design, new-built from original Green drawings by Peter Brotherhood Limited of Peterborough, though some variants used either a 60 hp (45 kW) ADC Cirrus 1 or an 80 hp (60 kW) Le Rhône. These new-build Greens were about 6 lb (3 kg) lighter.

The prototype first flew on 30 April 1919 from Avro's Hamble airfield. It crashed on the nearby foreshore two minutes into the flight due to pilot error. The second prototype flew successfully on 31 May 1919.

The type 534A Water Baby was a floatplane version with an altered rudder and large fin. The fourth (counting the short-lived prototype) Baby was designated Type 534B, distinguished by its plywood-covered fuselage and reduced-span lower wing. The Type 534C had both wings clipped for racing in the 1921 Aerial Derby. The 534D was a Baby modified for hot climates and was used by a businessman in India. All 534s were Green-engined single-seaters.

The Type 543 Baby was a two-seater with a 2 ft 6 in (76 cm) fuselage extension. It too was initially Green-powered, but in 1926, this was replaced by an 80 hp (60 kW) ADC Cirrus 1 air-cooled upright inline engine.

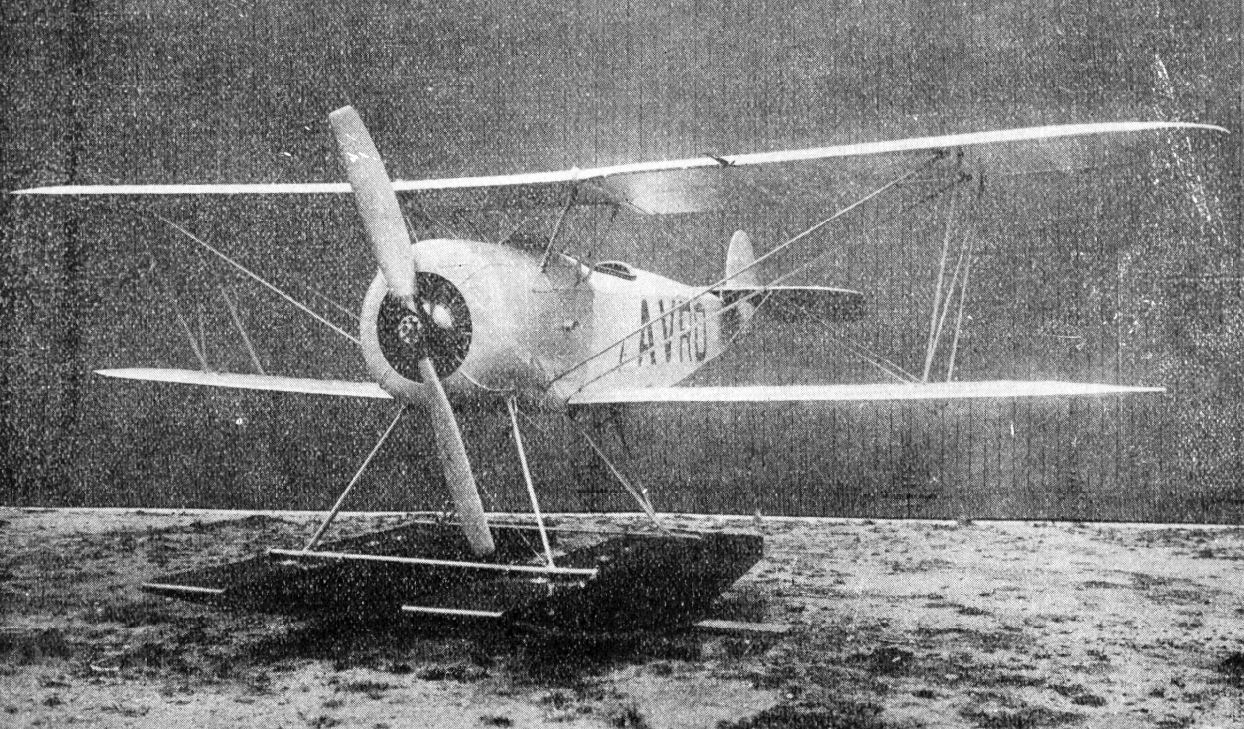
Avro 554 Antarctic Baby photo from L'Aerophile February,1922

The final version of the Baby was the type 554 Antarctic Baby, built as photographic aircraft for the 1921–1922 Shackleton–Rowett Expedition to Antarctica. This had an 80 hp (60 kW) le Rhone engine, raised tailplanes, rounded wingtips and tubular steel struts replacing rigging wires to avoid the problems of tensioning rigging wires with gloved hands. Like the Water Baby, it was a floatplane.

By far the strangest Baby was one modified by H.G. Leigh in 1920. The original wings were removed and instead the aircraft had a short, conventional, shoulder-mounted wing, bearing projecting, full-span ailerons. Above it was a strongly forward-staggered stack of six very narrow-chord wings of about the same span as the lower wing, hence each of very high aspect ratio and therefore with low induced drag. This complicated structure added about 60 lb (30 kg) to the weight. This "Venetian blind" wing design was proposed and previously explored by Horatio Phillips in the last decade of the 19th century.

== Operational history ==
The Babies were raced in the early 1920s by a variety of pilots but are best remembered for the flights of G-EACQ in the hands of Bert Hinkler. On 31 May 1920 he made a non-stop flight from Croydon to Turin in 9 hours 30 minutes – a flight of 655 mi (1,050 km) and celebrated at the time as "the most meritorious flight on record". On 24 July, he won second place in the handicap category of the Aerial Derby at Hendon, and on 11 April 1921 set a new distance record in Australia when he flew the Baby non-stop from Sydney to his home town of Bundaberg 800 mi (1,288 km) away, making the flight in 8 hours 40 minutes. Hinkler's Baby is preserved at the Hinkler Hall of Aviation in Bundaberg.

In June 1922, another Baby made the first flight between London and Moscow when the Russian Gwaiter collected his machine from Hamble and flew it home.

Ernest Shackleton planned to take an Avro Baby 'Antarctic' on his final expedition, but their ship, the Quest, delayed by engine trouble and by-passed Cape Town, to where the Avro had been shipped, after it was found it took up too much space on the Quest.

== Specifications (534 Baby, post-war Green engine) ==
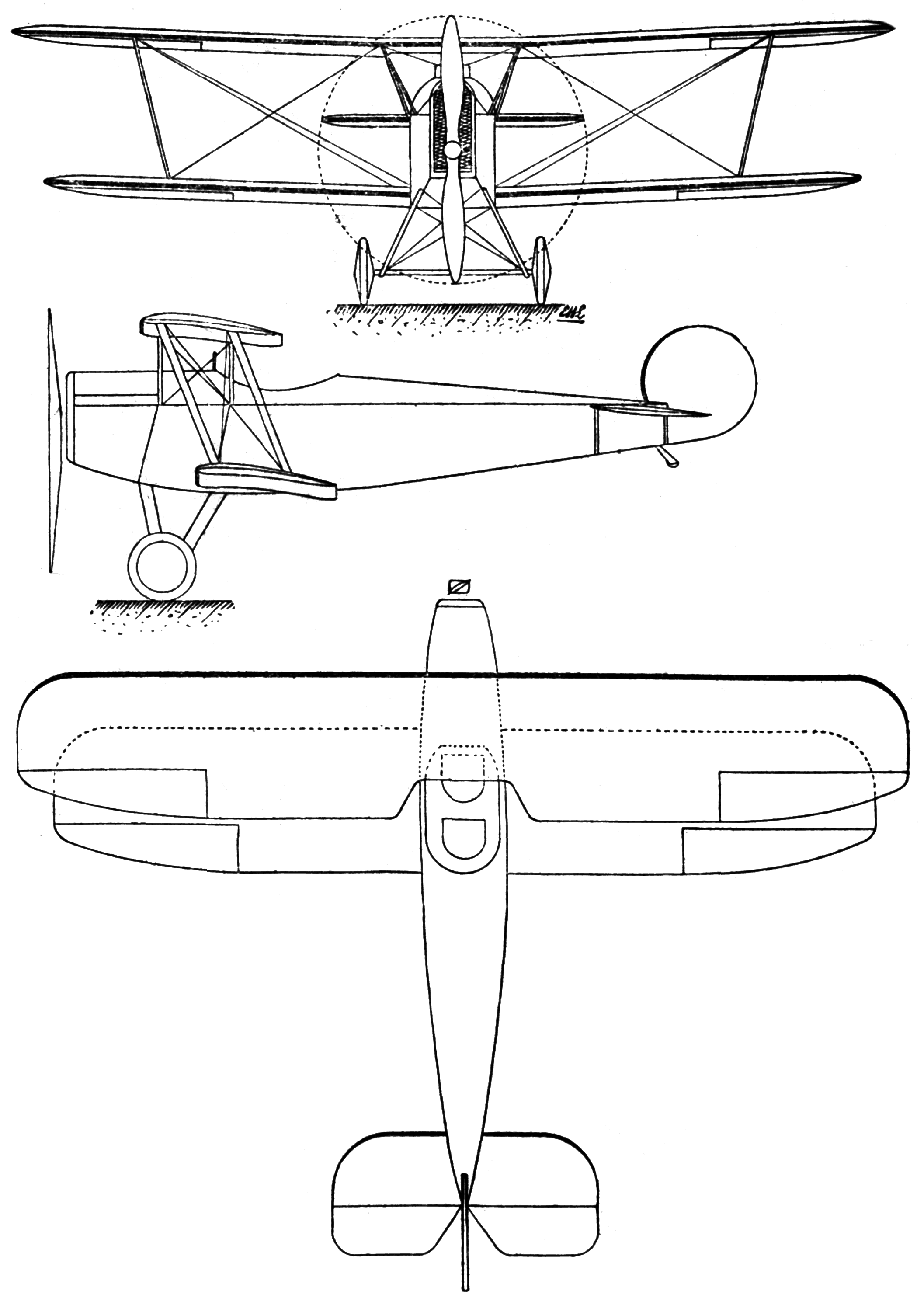
Avro Baby 3-view drawing from Les Ailes 1 September 1921

Data from Avro Aircraft since 1908

General characteristics

- Crew: 1
- Length: 17 ft 6 in (5.33 m)
- Wingspan: 25 ft 0 in (7.62 m)
- Height: 7 ft 7 in (2.31 m)
- Wing area: 180 sq ft (17 m^{2})
- Empty weight: 610 lb (277 kg)
- Gross weight: 825 lb (374 kg)
- Powerplant: 1 × Green C.4 4-cylinder water-cooled in-line piston engine, 35 hp (26 kW)
- Propellers: 2-bladed fixed-pitch propeller

Performance

- Maximum speed: 80 mph (130 km/h, 70 kn)
- Cruise speed: 70 mph (110 km/h, 61 kn)
- Range: 200 mi (320 km, 170 nmi)
- Rate of climb: 500 ft/min (2.5 m/s)
