= Martinsyde Semiquaver =

1920 British single-seat racing biplane

Semiquaver
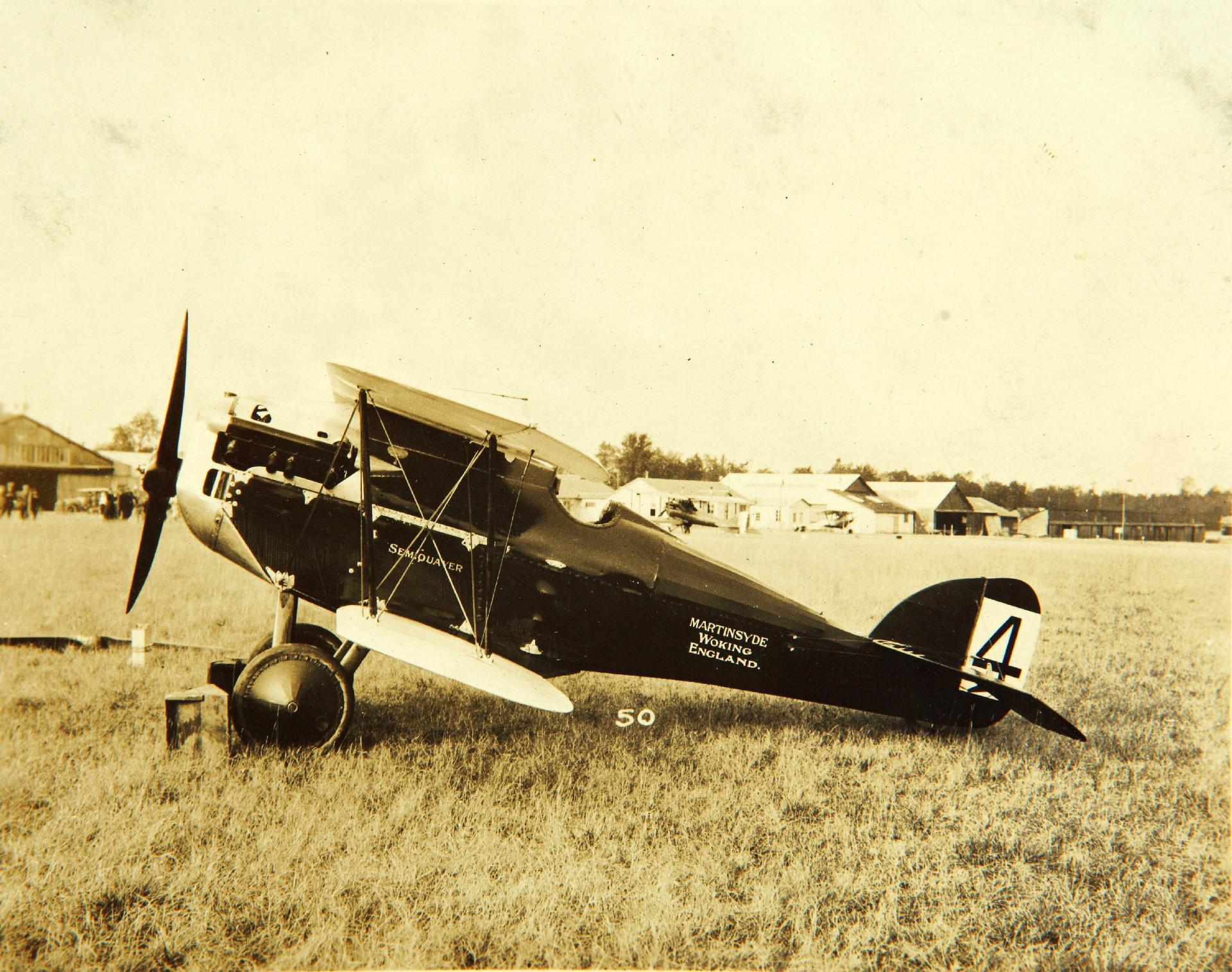

General information
- Type: Racing aircraft
- National origin: United Kingdom
- Manufacturer: Martinsyde
- Number built: 1

History
- First flight: 1920

The Martinsyde Semiquaver was a British single-seat racing biplane built by Martinsyde in 1920. It won the 1920 Aerial Derby and was entered for the 1920 Gordon Bennett Trophy, but did not finish the course. In 1921 the fuselage was used as the basis for the Alula Monoplane, an experimental aircraft intended to investigate the performance of a radical wing design by A. A Holle.

== Design and development ==
The Semiquaver was a single-bay tractor biplane with an upper wing of slightly greater span and chord than the lower. Ailerons were fitted to the top wing only, which was mounted directly on top of the deep rectangular-section fuselage. The pilot sat in an open cockpit behind the upper wing's trailing edge. Construction was of wood, with fabric covering on the wings, tail surfaces and rear part of the fuselage: the front of the fuselage was covered with plywood.

== Service history ==
Painted red and given the civil registration G-EAPX, it was flown by F. P. Raynham to set a new British speed record of 161.434 mph (259.75 km/h) on 21 March 1920 at Martlesham Heath.

Piloted by Frank Courtney, who replaced Raynham as pilot owing to an injury, it won the 1920 Aerial Derby, completing the 200 mi (320 km) course at a speed of 153.45 mph (246.95 km/h). On touching down at the end of the race Courtney hit a bump on the airfield and was thrown back into the air, touched the ground with one wingtip, and turned over. He was unhurt.

It was repaired, with a slight reduction in wingspan, and entered for the 1920 Gordon Bennett Trophy competition, flown by Raynham, who transported the aircraft to France by towing it behind his car. It did not finish the course owing to the failure of the oil pump.

== The Alula wing ==
The Alula Wing was a novel design which resembled a bow, having a straight trailing edge and a curved leading edge coming to a point at the wingtips. It was also unusual in being an unbraced monocoque structure, having no spars, only light spanwise stringers, strength being provided by the wood covering. It was developed by the Dutch engineer A.A. Holle and backed by a company called the Commercial Aeroplane Wing Syndicate, which took over Holle's patents from the Varioplane company, and was associated with Blackburn Aircraft, who carried out the construction and testing work. A test aircraft was built, with the wing mounted high above the fuselage of a D.H.6 re-engined with a 200 hp (150 kW) Bentley BR2 rotary engine. This was first flown in January 1921 by Capt. Clinch.

The characteristics of the wing in wind-tunnel tests carried out at the East London College indicated that it would be of most use for aircraft intended to carry a heavy load at lower speeds (an aircraft capable of carrying four tons, the Pelican Aero-Lorry was planned) but with the intention of demonstrating the wing's capabilities at higher speeds a version of the wing was fitted to the fuselage of the Semiquaver, the wing being mounted on struts above the fuselage.

Called the Alula Monoplane, with a span of 28 ft 6 in and an area of 106.25 sq ft this was entered for the 1921 Aerial Derby with Frank Courtney as pilot, but Courtney was unhappy with its ground handling characteristics, due to the combination of a high centre of gravity and a narrow-track undercarriage, and it was not flown in the competition.

After the original landing gear has been replaced by one having a much wider track it was flown by R. W. Kenworthy at Northolt on 27 August, the takeoff speed being a high 110 mph (180 km/h)

== Specifications ==
Data from

General characteristics

- Crew: one
- Length: 19 ft 3 in (5.87 m)
- Wingspan: 20 ft 2 in (6.15 m)
- Powerplant: 1 × Hispano-Suiza -water-cooled V-8, 300 hp (220 kW)
- Propellers: 2-bladed

Performance

- Maximum speed: 161 mph (259 km/h, 140 kn)
