= Avro 531 Spider =

531 Spider and 538
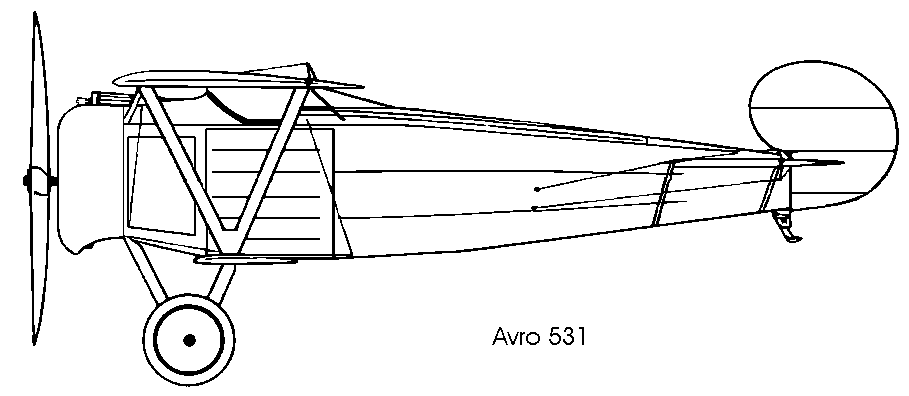

General information
- Type: Fighter
- Manufacturer: Avro
- Designer: Clifton Britt
- Number built: 2

History
- First flight: April 1918

The Avro 531 Spider was a prototype First World War British sesquiplane fighter aircraft built by Avro.

== Design and development ==
The Spider was a sesquiplane with a largely conventional configuration, but it used Warren truss-type interplane struts, hence the appellation "Spider". In tests, the aircraft demonstrated exceptional performance, handling, and pilot visibility however the time it flew, the War Office had already selected the Sopwith Snipe for mass production.

A second, more refined version, the Avro 531A, was apparently never completed, but some of its components seem to have been used to build a derivative, the Avro 538. This had standard interplane struts and was intended as a racing aircraft. It was never used for this purpose, however, because it was discovered that it had a faulty wing spar, so the Avro firm used it as a hack instead from May 1919 to September 1920.

== Specifications (531) ==
Data from Avro Aircraft since 1908

General characteristics

- Crew: one pilot
- Length: 20 ft 6 in (6.25 m)
- Wingspan: 28 ft 6 in (8.69 m)
- Height: 7 ft 10 in (2.39 m)
- Wing area: 189 sq ft (17.6 m^{2})
- Empty weight: 963 lb (437 kg)
- Gross weight: 1,517 lb (688 kg)
- Powerplant: 1 × Clerget 9B air-cooled rotary piston engine , 130 hp (97 kW)

Performance

- Maximum speed: 120 mph (190 km/h, 100 kn)
- Range: 250 mi (400 km, 220 nmi)
- Service ceiling: 19,000 ft (5,800 m)
- Rate of climb: 1,250 ft/min (6.4 m/s)

Armament
1 × fixed, forward-firing .303 in (7.7 mm) Vickers machine gun
