= Harry Hawker =

Australian aviation pioneer (1889–1921)

Harry George Hawker
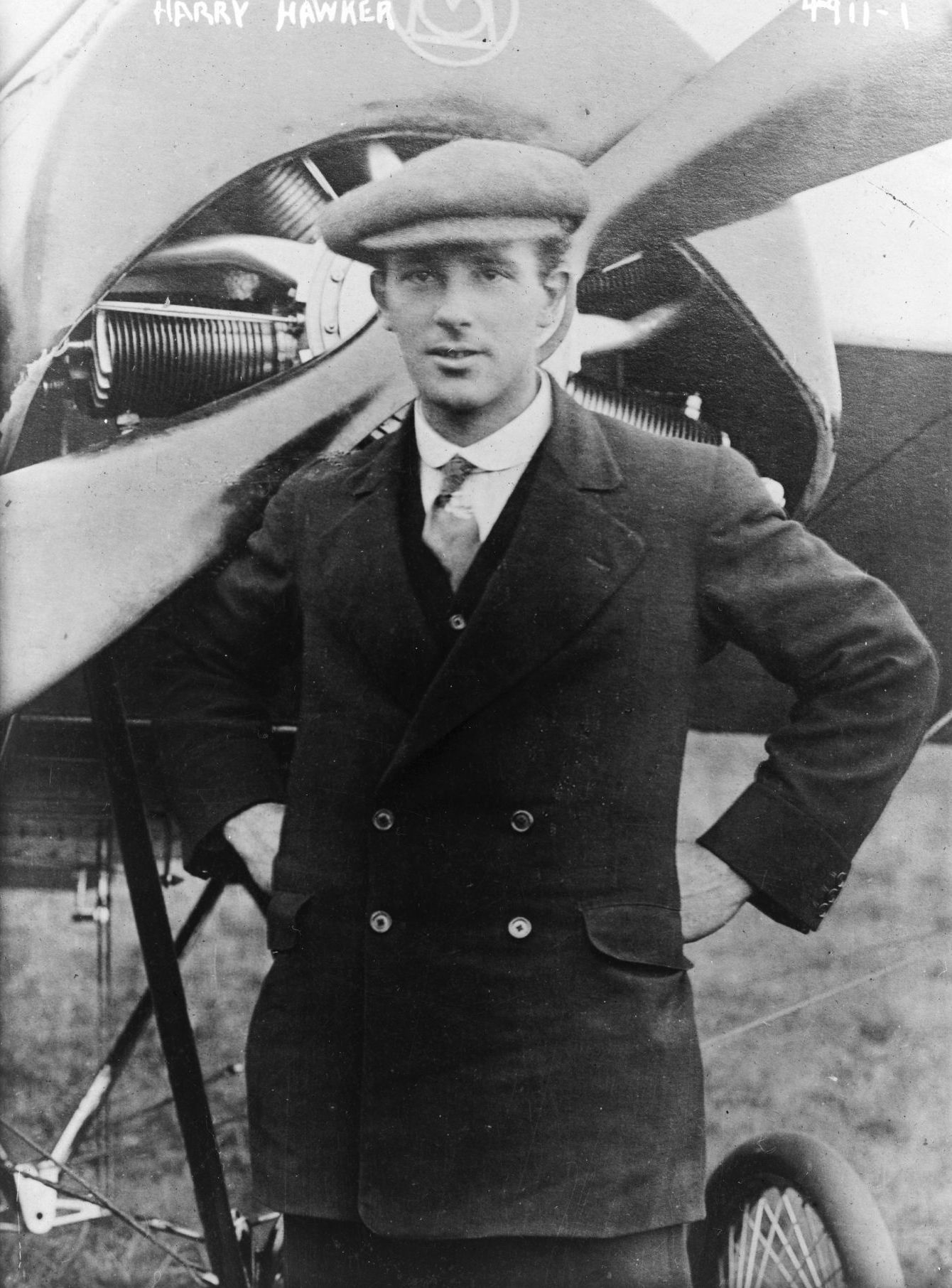
- Hawker in May 1919
- Born: 22 January 1889; Moorabbin, Victoria, Australia
- Died: 12 July 1921 (aged 32); Hendon Aerodrome, North London
- Cause of death: Aircraft crash
- Resting place: St Pauls' Church, Chessington, Surrey
- Occupation: Aviator
- Known for: Test pilot, co-founder of Hawker Aircraft
- Spouse(s): Muriel Peaty, 1917
- Awards: MBE, AFC

Harry George Hawker, MBE, AFC (22 January 1889 – 12 July 1921) was an Australian aviation pioneer. He was the chief test pilot for Sopwith and was also involved in the design of many of their aircraft. After the First World War, he co-founded Hawker Aircraft, the firm that would later be responsible for a long series of successful military aircraft. He died on 12 July 1921 when the aircraft he was to fly in the Aerial Derby crashed in a park at Burnt Oak, Edgware, not far from Hendon Aerodrome.

== Early life ==
Hawker was born on 22 January 1889 at Moorabbin, Victoria in Australia, the second son of George Hawker, a blacksmith, and Mary Ann Gilliard Anderson. He attended Moorabbin Primary School. As an 11-year-old, he worked at the Melbourne garage of Hall & Warden, helping to build engines for five shillings a week, moving on to the Tarrant Motor & Engineering Co, helping make Tarrant cars, where he qualified as a mechanic. In 1907, he moved again to become the chauffeur and mechanic for Ernest De Little in Caramut, Western Victoria. In 1910 he travelled to Diggers Rest, north-west of Melbourne, to see the first public demonstrations of powered flight made in Australia, and decided to go to England to become involved in aviation, arriving in May 1911.

On 14 November 1917, Hawker married Muriel Alice Peaty at St Peter's Church, Ealing.

== Aviation career ==
In England, Hawker obtained a job with the Commer Car Company, moving to the Mercedes company in January 1912 and then to Austro Daimler. During this time he spent much of his spare time at Brooklands, then the hub of British aviation, and in June 1912 he got a job as a mechanic for the Sopwith Aviation Company.

He soon persuaded Sopwith to teach him to fly, and succeeded in making his first solo flight after only three lessons. He was awarded his Royal Aero Club pilot's licence, No. 297, in September 1912 and shortly afterwards, on 24 October, he won the Michelin Cup for flight endurance with a flight lasting 8 hours 23 minutes.

He also appears to have been the first person to perform an intentional spin and recovery, demonstrating in 1914 one method (though generally not the one used today) to return to level flight from this unusual attitude. Because spins had killed several pilots, this was a major advance in aviation safety.

Having established his name as an aviator, he became chief test pilot for Tom Sopwith. At Sopwiths in 1916, Hawker had the personal use of a small aircraft, the Sopwith Bee. He was also a regular competitor in motor car and motorcycle races at Brooklands before and after the First World War. Among his competitive achievements were a number of altitude records set in June 1913 He also won a £1,000 consolation prize in the Daily Mail Circuit of Britain Waterplane Race on 25 August 1913.

=== Brief return to Australia ===
In 1914, Harry Hawker returned to Australia to demonstrate the advanced Sopwith Tabloid, which he had helped design. A wild crowd nearly wrecked the plane on one occasion, and he further damaged it during stunt flying. On his return to England, he continued designing and testing aircraft with Sopwith throughout the First World War.

=== Attempt at first transatlantic flight ===
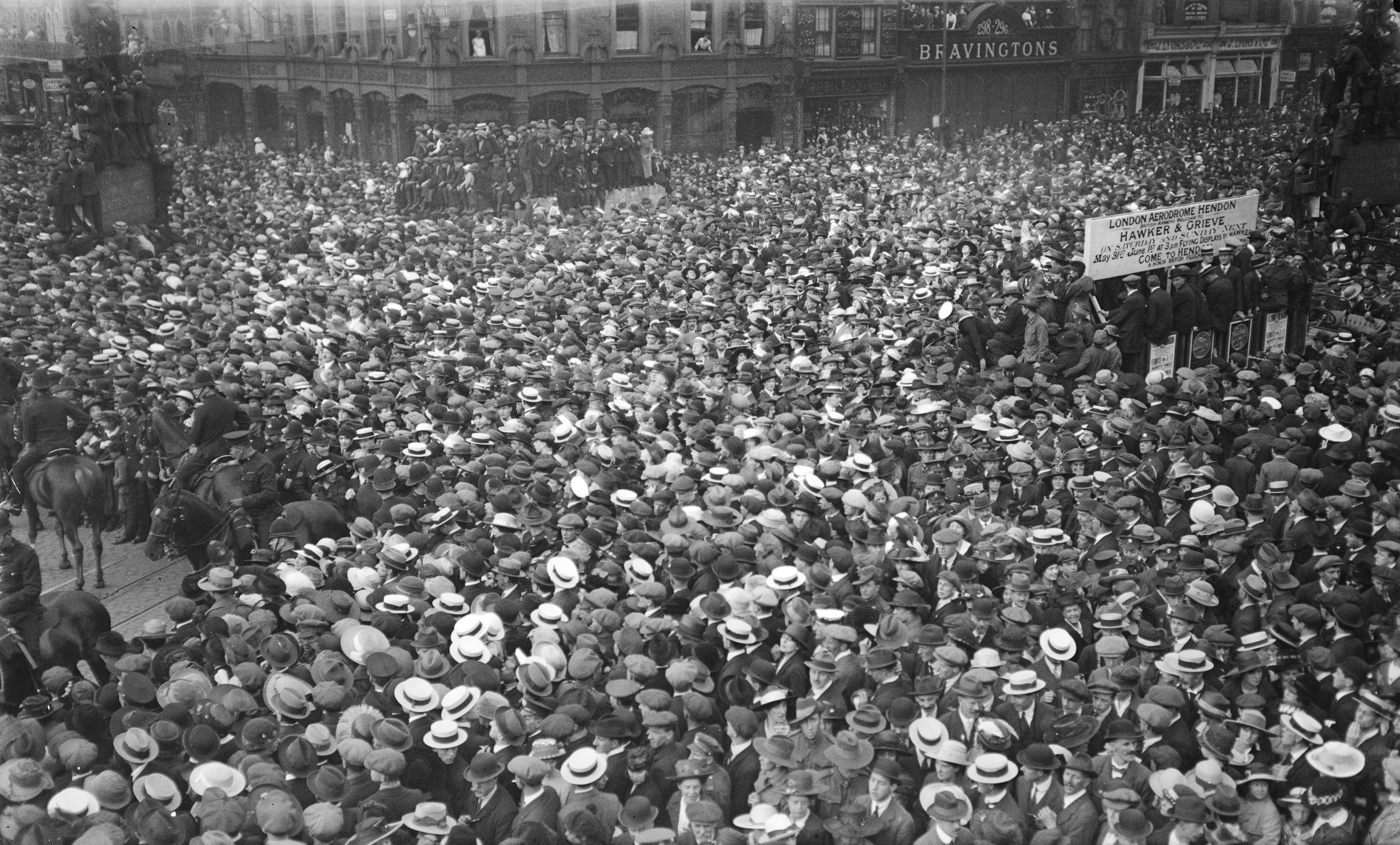
Crowd welcoming Australian Harry George Hawker and Anglo-Canadian Kenneth MacKenzie-Grieve, Kings Cross London, 1919

After the war, together with navigator Kenneth Mackenzie Grieve, he attempted to win the Daily Mail £10,000 prize for the first flight across the Atlantic in "72 consecutive hours". On 18 May 1919, they set off from Mount Pearl, Newfoundland, in the Sopwith Atlantic biplane. After fourteen and a half hours of flight, the engine overheated and they were forced to change course to intercept the shipping lanes, where they were able to locate a passing freighter, the Danish Mary. The Mary did not have a functioning radio, so that it was not until six days later, when the steamer reached Butt of Lewis, Scotland, that word was received that they were safe. Hawker and Grieve were awarded a consolation prize of £5,000 by the Daily Mail. Hawker later named his second daughter Mary after the ship that had rescued him and Grieve.

The Atlantic was found afloat and recovered by the US steamer Lake Charleville. The wheels from the undercarriage, jettisoned soon after takeoff were later recovered by local fishermen and later donated to the Rooms Provincial Museum in St John's. One wheel is currently on display at Admiralty House Communications Museum in Mount Pearl.

=== A new beginning ===
In September 1920, Sopwith Aviation was liquidated because of fears the government would examine the wartime aircraft production contracts of companies like Sopwith and impose a crippling retrospective tax liability on them.

Harry Hawker, Thomas Sopwith, Frederick Sigrist, and Bill Eyre then formed a new company, each contributing £5,000. To avoid any possible claims against the new company for the wartime contracts of the old company, they chose to call it H.G. Hawker Engineering. (It was renamed Hawker Aircraft in 1933.) As Tom Sopwith put it:

to avoid any muddle if we had gone on building aeroplanes and called them Sopwiths—there was bound to be a muddle somewhere—we called the company the Hawker Company. I didn't mind. He was largely responsible for our growth during the war.

== Death ==
Hawker was killed on 12 July 1921 when his Nieuport Goshawk crashed while he was climbing away from Hendon Aerodrome while practising for the Aerial Derby. "Medical examination led physicians to believe that Hawker had suffered a haemorrhage and that he had tried to get back down on the ground." Fire in the air and spinal tuberculosis were considered contributing factors to his death.

"The king sent a message of condolence, asserting 'The nation had lost one of its most distinguished airmen.'"

Hawker is buried in St Pauls' Church, Hook, Chessington, Surrey. He was survived by his wife, Muriel, and two daughters.

== Honours ==
In 1978, he was honoured with a postage stamp depicting his portrait issued by Australia Post. In addition five hundred commemorative First Day Covers were printed, many of which were purchased by the families of children attending the Moorabbin School.

In 1989, Moorabbin Airport at Mentone in Australia was renamed "Moorabbin (Harry Hawker) Airport"

In 2007, Kingston University London named the extension to their Roehampton Vale Campus the "Hawker Wing".

Moorabbin Primary School has named one of the school houses Hawker House in his honour.
