= Runciman =

Runciman can refer to:

== People ==
- Alexander Runciman, Scottish painter
- Bob Runciman, Canadian politician
- David Runciman, British political scientist
- Ewart Runciman, Australian politician
- Hilda Runciman, Viscountess Runciman of Doxford, British Liberal Party politician
- James Runciman, English teacher, author and journalist
- John Runciman, Scottish painter
- Richard Runciman Terry, English organist, choir director and musicologist
- Ruth Runciman, former Chair of the UK Mental Health Act Commission
- Ryan Runciman, New Zealand actor
- Steven Runciman, British medieval historian
- Walter Runciman, 1st Baron Runciman, shipping magnate, Liberal MP, and peer
- Walter Runciman, 1st Viscount Runciman of Doxford, Liberal and later National Liberal MP and government minister
- Walter Leslie Runciman, 2nd Viscount Runciman of Doxford
- (Walter) Garry Runciman, 3rd Viscount Runciman of Doxford, British historical sociologist

== Other ==
- Runciman Award, annual literary award for works dealing with Greece or Hellenism
- Runciman, New Zealand is a rural area in Auckland Region, New Zealand
  - Ngakoroa railway station, situated in the Runciman area and sometimes called Runciman station
  - Runciman railway station, situated on the North Island Main Trunk line in New Zealand, used 1874–1918
- Runciman Report, a series of letters concerning the Munich Agreement of 1938
  - Runciman Mission, the diplomatic mission preceding the report
- Runciman Report, British 2000 police inquiry into the Misuse of Drugs Act 1971
- Runciman Rock, a rock part of the Argentine Islands
- Runciman's Disease, a fictional viral disease in the novel The War in 2020 by Ralph Peters
