= Carrycoats =

Former civil parish in Northumberland, England

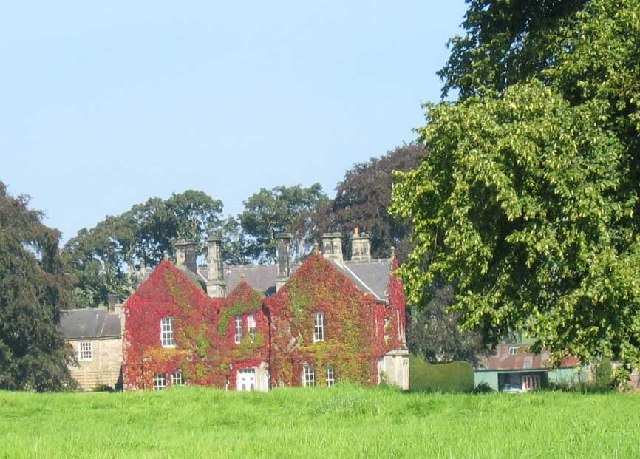
- Carrycoats Hall

- Location within Northumberland
- Civil parish: Birtley
- Unitary authority: Northumberland
- Ceremonial county: Northumberland
- Region: North East
- Country: England
- Sovereign state: United Kingdom

Carrycoats is a former civil parish, now in the parish of Birtley, in the county of Northumberland, England. In 1951 the parish had a population of 34.

== History ==
Carrycoats was formerly a township in the parish of Thockrington. In 1870–72, it was a 1,799-acre (728 ha) township with nine houses and population of 41, according to John Marius Wilson's Imperial Gazetteer of England and Wales. It was noted to be 6.5 miles (10.5 km) ESE of the village of Bellingham. From 1866 Carrycoats was a civil parish in its own right until it was abolished on 1 April 1958 and merged with Birtley.

It was a single estate, Carrycoats Estate, including Carrycoats Hall and several farms. The entire estate was offered for sale at auction on 5 September 1877. The estate then produced €935 per annum, not including €49 for the leasing of a colliery and not including the value of the residence. It was mainly pasture, with four "compact occupations" (farm complexes).The estate was stated to be nearly 1,800 acres, and four miles from Bellingham.

Carrycoats was part of Bellingham Poor Law Union. (See List of poor law unions in England.)

== Carrycoats Hall ==
Carrycoats Hall (55.1140°N 2.1203°W) is a Grade II listed building located on the Carry Burn about 2,000 feet (610 m) to the east of the A68 road. It is believed to be located on the site of Carrycoats Bastle, part of the suppressed monastery of Newminster. The hall has a two-gable front characteristic of the c.1840s or c.1850s, but its central portion is probably a century older. "Carrycoats Hall" is also a tune composed by Northumbrian fiddler and composer Robert Whinham, known also as "Remember Me".

The property was divided into four compact "occupations" known as Waterfalls, Whitehouse, Whiteside and Cragback Farms.

It has been the site of fund-raisers, such as a 2015 fund-raiser for the church at Thockrington.

== Toponymy ==
The name Carrycoats, first recorded as Carricot in 1245, may have a Brittonic origin. The first part of the name may be the element cajr, with a primary sense of "an enclosed, defensible site" (i.e. "a hill-fort"; Welsh caer). This is followed by the definite article ï[r] (Welsh y[r]). The final element might be cę:d, meaning "wild country, forest, woods" (Welsh coed, Old Cornish cuit), replaced by Old English -cote, "a cottage", with the plural -s added later. Carrycoats may have had a meaning of "stronghold in the wood".

It is possible, however, that the township was named from the nearby Carry Burn, a river-name derived from Brittonic *carr, meaning "a stone, rock", though it could also be that the river was a back-formation from Carrycoats.
