= Walter Runciman =

Walter Runciman may refer to:

- Walter Runciman, 1st Baron Runciman (1847–1937), shipping magnate, Liberal MP, and peer
- Walter Runciman, 1st Viscount Runciman of Doxford (1870–1949), son of the above, Liberal and later National Liberal MP and government minister
- Walter Leslie Runciman, 2nd Viscount Runciman of Doxford (1900–1989)
- Walter Garry Runciman, 3rd Viscount Runciman of Doxford, British historical sociologist
