= Royal Northumberland Yacht Club =

- Club logo
- Full name: Royal Northumberland Yacht Club
- Short name: RNYC
- Founded: 1890; 136 years ago
- Location: Blyth, Northumberland, England
- Focus: Yachting, cruising and racing
- Website: RNYC

The Royal Northumberland Yacht Club is based in the Port of Blyth, Northumberland, England.

== History ==
The club was formed at Alnmouth in 1890 when a group of owners sought permission from the Duke of Northumberland to erect temporary sheds on the foreshore for purposes of winter refit. The Duke's Estates would not deal with them individually but only if they formed an 'association'. By 1899 the club had moved to the Port of Blyth. From its earliest days the club's headquarters have been afloat. The first House Yacht was a schooner once owned by Robert Stephenson, the engineer. The second was an Admiralty concrete tug, the Cretehatch which capsized at its moorings in 1949. The present vessel is a former Trinity House light vessel (LV 50), which last saw service at Calshot Spit at the entrance to Southampton Water. Built in 1879, she is the oldest surviving wooden light vessel still afloat in the UK.

== Present ==
The club's boatyard and boat sheds are adjacent to its pontoons and fore and aft trot moorings in the South Harbour at Blyth. It also operates a boat hoist for members. There is a full racing and social programme, and its members cruise extensively. The Club publishes Sailing Directions providing detailed information for those cruising the coast from the river Humber to Rattray Head. The club is affiliated to the RYA and provides RYA training for its members.

The club's Patron is the Duke of Edinburgh, its president is the Duke of Northumberland and for many years it was associated with Viscount Runciman of Doxford, Northumberland, Walter Leslie Runciman, the 2nd Viscount serving as Admiral until his death in 1989.
