= Constance Leathart =

British pilot (1903–1993)

- Born: Constance Ruth Leathart; 7 December 1903; Low Fell, England
- Died: 4 November 1993 (aged 89); Northumberland, England
- Other names: Connie, Con
- Education: Cheltenham Ladies College; Ethelburgas School
- Occupations: Aviator; Farmer
- Employer(s): Cramlington Aircraft; Bristol Airport
- Organization: Air Transport Auxiliary
- Known for: Pioneering female aviator

Constance Ruth Leathart (7 December 1903 – 4 November 1993) was a British female pilot who flew Royal Air Force aircraft on transit flights in World War Two in the Air Transport Auxiliary.

== Early life ==
Constance Ruth Leathart was born on 7 December 1903 in Low Fell, County Durham into a wealthy family. She was the only child of Janet Ruth Grant (née Tennant) and Thomas Headley Leathart. Known as Connie, she was educated at Cheltenham Ladies College, and Queen Ethelburga's Collegiate until 1921. She made a lifelong friend with Susan Slade who she met at the later school, both later becoming pilots.

== Flying career ==
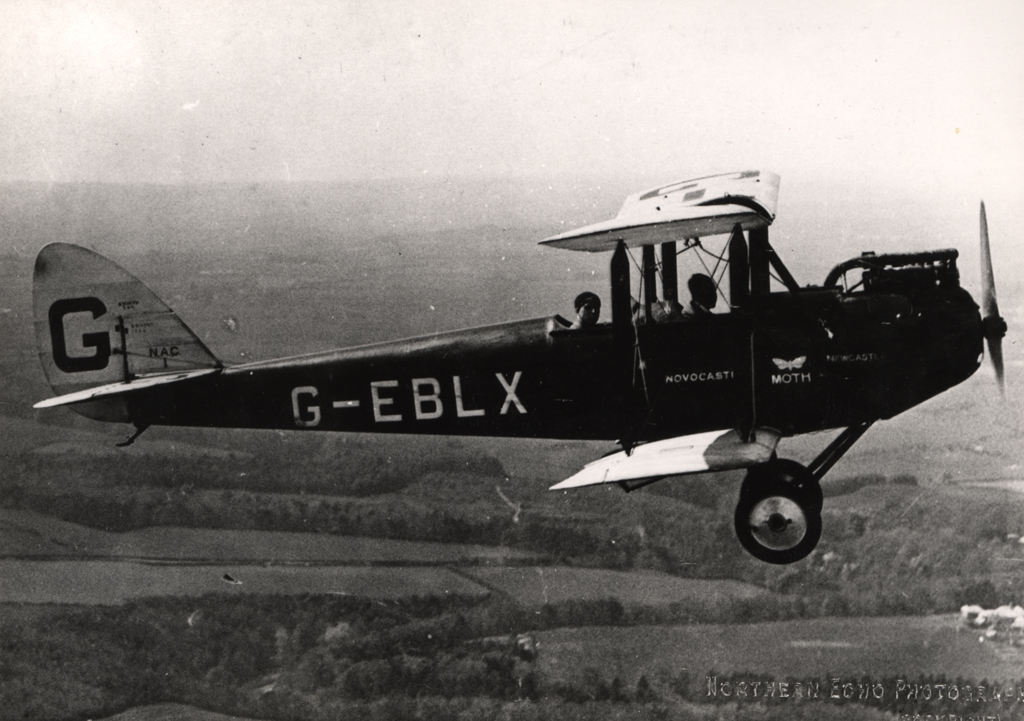
de Havilland Moth G-EBLX 'Novocastria', one of the first aircraft that Leathart flew

Leathart started flying lessons in 1925 at Newcastle Aero Club. She wrote her name as "C. R. Leathart" on the application form, and was accepted before the club realised her gender. Her first flight was in September 1925 in the club de Havilland DH.60 Moth named "Novocastria", which she crashed in her first solo landing in 1926. When she received her flying licence in 1927, Leathart became the first British female pilot outside London, and one of the first 20 overall.

She started an aircraft repair business, Cramlington Aircraft, with Walter Runciman, later Viscount Runciman, participated successfully in air races with him, and was one of a group of flying socialites. She was "one of the first women to fly over the Alps, in a de Havilland Tiger Moth", and was the first in Great Britain to design and fly a glider.

Aircraft owned:

- Sopwith Grasshopper G-EAIN February 1928 to May 1929
- Westland Widgeon IIIa G-AAJF June 1929 to May 1931 (crashed in Germany)
- De Havilland DH.60 Cirrus Moth G-EBRX February 1932 to June 1933
- Comper Swift G-ABUU April 1934 to May 1940

== Air Transport Auxiliary ==
When World War II broke out she was working in the map department at Bristol Airport and volunteered as one of the first members of the Air Transport Auxiliary, female pilots who delivered aircraft from the manufacturers; her instructor in military flying was her cousin John "Jack" Armour. She achieved the ATA rank of Flight Captain, flying heavy bombers as well as fighters to airfields in many countries.

== Later life ==
After the war ended she became a United Nations special representative to the Greek island of Icaria and received an award of merit from the International Union for Child Welfare. She reluctantly gave up flying in 1958 and retired to a farm in Little Bavington, Northumberland, where she cared for rescued donkeys.

Leathart is buried at Thockrington church; she had requested her grave not be marked, but friends placed as a marker the stone she used to step into her unheated swimming pool every day regardless of weather.

Northumberland Archives hold a collection of her papers including a number of photograph albums which record her adventures in aviation from the 1920s to the 1940s.
