= Austin Osprey =

A.F.T.3 Osprey
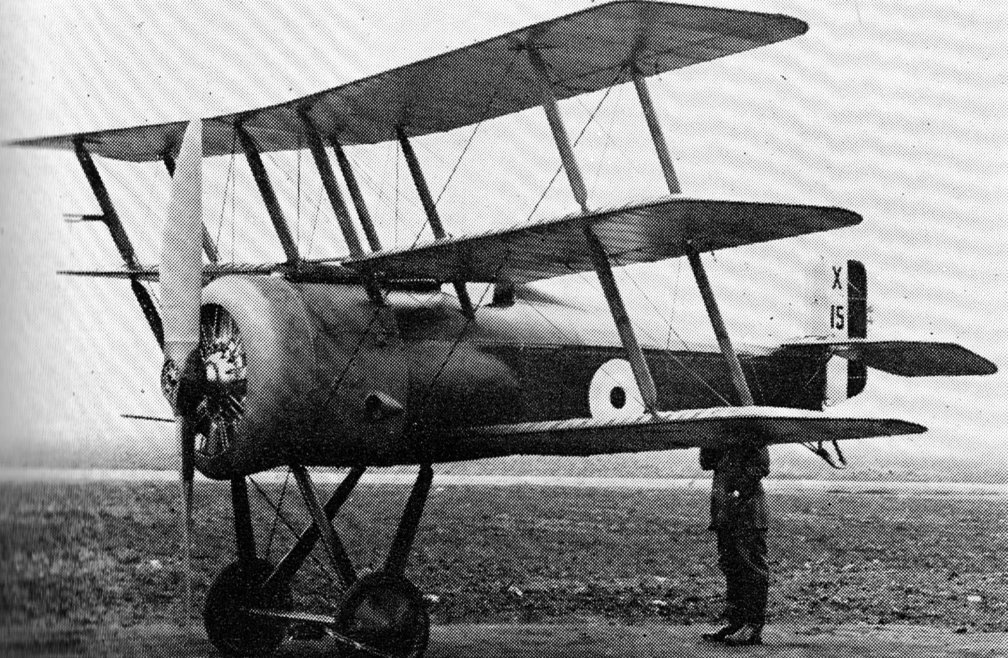

General information
- Type: Fighter aircraft
- National origin: British
- Manufacturer: Austin Motor Company
- Status: Prototype
- Number built: 1

History
- First flight: 1918

The Austin A.F.T.3 Osprey was a prototype British fighter triplane of the First World War. Developed by the motor car manufacturer Austin as a replacement to the Sopwith Camel, only one was built, the Sopwith Snipe being preferred.

== Development and design ==
In 1917, Britain's War Office issued Specification A.1.A for a single-seat fighter to replace the Sopwith Camel. To meet this requirement, the Austin Motor Company, already a large scale manufacturer of aircraft to Royal Aircraft Factory designs, produced its own design for a single-engined triplane, the A.F.T.3 Osprey, receiving a licence to build three prototypes as a private venture.

The Osprey was of conventional wood and fabric construction, with single-bay triplane wings. It was powered by a Bentley BR2 rotary engine, and featured the required armament of two Vickers machine guns and a single Lewis gun. The synchronised Vickers guns were mounted ahead of the pilot, while the Lewis gun was mounted on a movable mounting on the centre section of the middle wing, where it had a very limited field of fire, with the large diameter propeller blocking any forward fire. Like a similar gun mounted on the Snipe it would probably have been deleted had the type gone into production.

The first Osprey flew in February 1918, being tested at Martlesham Heath in March. It was heavier than expected, and its performance was inferior to Sopwith's Snipe. When the Snipe was selected as the winner of the competition for the new fighter, Austin abandoned development of the Osprey, with the second and third prototypes not completed. The first prototype was briefly used for trials at the Royal Aircraft Establishment, Farnborough until at least June 1918.

== Specifications ==
Data from British Aeroplanes 1914-18

General characteristics

- Crew: 1
- Length: 17 ft 7 in (5.36 m)
- Wingspan: 23 ft 0 in (7.01 m)
- Height: 10 ft 8 in (3.25 m)
- Wing area: 233 sq ft (21.6 m^{2})
- Empty weight: 1,106 lb (502 kg)
- Gross weight: 1,888 lb (856 kg)
- Fuel capacity: 40 imp gal (48 US gal; 180 L)
- Powerplant: 1 × Bentley BR2 nine-cylinder rotary engine, 230 hp (170 kW)

Performance

- Maximum speed: 118.5 mph (190.7 km/h, 103.0 kn) at 10,000 ft (3,000 m)
- Endurance: 3 hr at 15,000 ft (4,600 m)
- Service ceiling: 19,000 ft (5,800 m)
- Time to altitude: 10 min 20 s to 10,000 ft (3,000 m)

Armament

- Guns: 2× forward-firing, synchronised .303 in Vickers machine guns and one Lewis gun on semi-free mounting on rear of middle wing

== See also ==
Aircraft of comparable role, configuration, and era

- Armstrong Whitworth Armadillo
- Boulton Paul Bobolink
- Nieuport B.N.1
- Sopwith Snipe
