= Edward Riddle =

English mathematician and astronomer

- Born: 1788
- Died: March 31, 1854
- Occupation: Educator

Edward Riddle FRAS (1788 – 31 March 1854) was an English mathematician and astronomer, known for A Treatise on Navigation and Nautical Astronomy.

== Life ==
Riddle, a son of John Riddell, an agricultural labourer, and his wife Mary, was born at Troughend in Northumberland, where he received his early education. He afterwards attended a school nearby at West Woodburn, kept by Cuthbert Atkinson, father of the mathematician Henry Atkinson. At eighteen he became a schoolmaster, and soon opened his own school in Otterburn.

In 1807 he moved to Whitburn in Durham, and in 1810 began contributing to The Ladies' Diary, winning in 1814 and 1819 the prizes given by the editor, Charles Hutton. It was through the latter that, in September 1814, Riddle was appointed master of Trinity House School, Newcastle-on-Tyne. While here he made an extensive series of observations to ascertain the longitude of the school and the trustworthiness of certain lunar observations.

In September 1821, again through Charles Hutton, he was appointed master of the upper mathematical school, Royal Naval Hospital, Greenwich, where he remained till September 1851. His abilities as a nautical educator were highly appreciated by the admiralty. Riddle was elected a fellow of the Royal Astronomical Society; he contributed several papers to the Transactions of the Society, and from 1825 to 1851 was an active member of the council.

After his retirement his bust in marble, sculpted by William Theed, was publicly presented to him by a large number of friends (Illustrated London News, 29 May 1852). He died from paralysis at Greenwich on 31 March 1854.

== Family ==
He married in 1814 Elizabeth Wallace. He was survived by his wife and two married daughters, Jane and Eliza, and by his son John Riddle (1816–1862), who was headmaster of Greenwich Hospital schools, and examiner in navigation to the Department of Science and Art.

== Publications ==
Riddle's most valuable work was A Treatise on Navigation and Nautical Astronomy (1824; 4th edition 1842; 8th edition 1864), forming a complete course of mathematics for sailors, and combining practice and theory in just proportion, which was not usually done at that time in books of this class; the tables of logarithms were issued separately in 1841 and 1851. He re-edited Hutton's Mathematical Recreations (1840, 1854).

He also published some sixteen papers on astronomical subjects, of which eight are in the Philosophical Magazine, 1818–22, 1826, 1828, five in Memoirs of the Royal Astronomical Society, 1829, 1830, 1833, 1840, 1842, and three in Monthly Notices of the Royal Astronomical Society, 1833–9, 1845–7. The most important are those on chronometers (in which the author shows how to find the rates without the help of a transit instrument) (cf. Philosophical Magazine 1818; Memoirs of the Royal Astronomical Society 1829); "On the Present State of Nautical Astronomy" (Philosophical Magazine 1821, and published separately); "On a Simplification of Ivory's Solution of the Doublealtitude Problem" (Philosophical Magazine 1822); and "On the Longitude of Madras" (Memoirs of the Royal Astronomical Society 1842), a paper containing some formulas and remarks.
