= Cramlington Aerodrome =

Defunct airfield near Newcastle upon Tyne, England

- IATA: none; ICAO: none

Summary
- Serves: Newcastle upon Tyne
- Opened: February 1, 1915
- Elevation AMSL: 77 m (253 ft)
- Coordinates: 55°05′35.8″N 01°37′20″W

Map
- Location in England Cramlington (Northumberland)

Cramlington Aerodrome was a military airfield established in Northumberland during the First World War. It became a civil airfield serving the Tyneside area of north-east England and operated until 1935, when it was replaced by Woolsington Airport, now known as Newcastle International Airport.

== History ==
=== Military ===
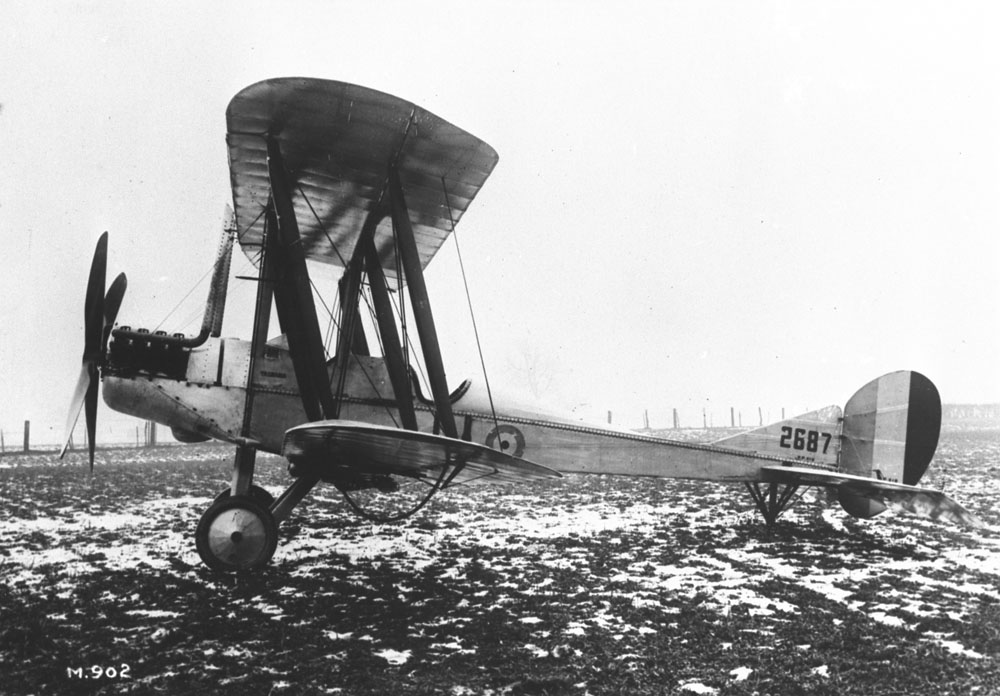
A B.E.2c of the RFC

In response to German Zeppelin airship raids over the industrially important Tyneside area in 1915, a flight of three Royal Flying Corps (RFC) B.E.2c fighters were based at a field near Cramlington in late November to defend against further raids. The aircraft arrived on 1 December 1915 and were housed in canvas hangars. The site was chosen as it was higher and thus less prone to fog than local coastal locations.

The British Army and Royal Navy at first debated who should operate the field, with the army winning, and on 1 February 1916 No. 36 (Home Defence) Squadron was officially formed and three hangars were built. Known as RFC Cramlington, it was the first RFC airfield in the north-east of England. Extensive wooden buildings were constructed for offices, stores and accommodation, mostly on the far side of the road that ran down the east side of the airfield, which was also bordered to the north by a railway line.

The airfield was under the control of Headquarters, Training Division, RFC, and training became a significant function. It was used by Reserve Squadrons 47, 52 and 61, as well as 75 Training Squadron, later renamed to 52 Training Depot Station.

Operations continued throughout the rest of the war, and a 70 ft (21 m) radio transmitter mast was erected to enable information and instructions to be sent to pilots from the ground. When the RFC became the Royal Air Force on 1 April 1918 the airfield became RAF Cramlington.

In April 1918, the first flight of the Armstrong Whitworth F.M.4 Armadillo fighter took place at Cramlington because their normal field, at Town Moor Aerodrome in Newcastle, was surrounded by obstructions and too rough. The aircraft was not a success.

Further land was requisitioned for the construction of a larger hangar, the building of which extended into 1919. However, with the end of the war, the RAF had no further plans for the airfield, and it was reduced to Care and Maintenance status on 22 January 1920, and the RAF left completely in March.

==== Major Units ====
Major units based at Cramlington (in date order)

- No. 36 Sqdn RFC Formed at Cramlington on 1 February 1916, HQ moved to Jesmond, Newcastle, and flights dispersed 12 October 1916
- No. 58 Sqdn RFC Formed Cramlington 8 June 1916, to Dover 17 December 1917
- No. 76 Sqdn RFC Formed Cramlington 15 September 1916, to Ripon 10 October 1916
- No. 63 Sqdn RFC From Stirling 31 October 1916, to Middle East June 1917
- No. 120 Sqdn RFC Formed Cramlington 1 January 1918, to Bracebridge Heath 3 August 1918
- No. 252 Squadron RAF Based Tynemouth, detachment to Cramlington May 1918, to Killingholme 31 January 1919

=== Civil ===
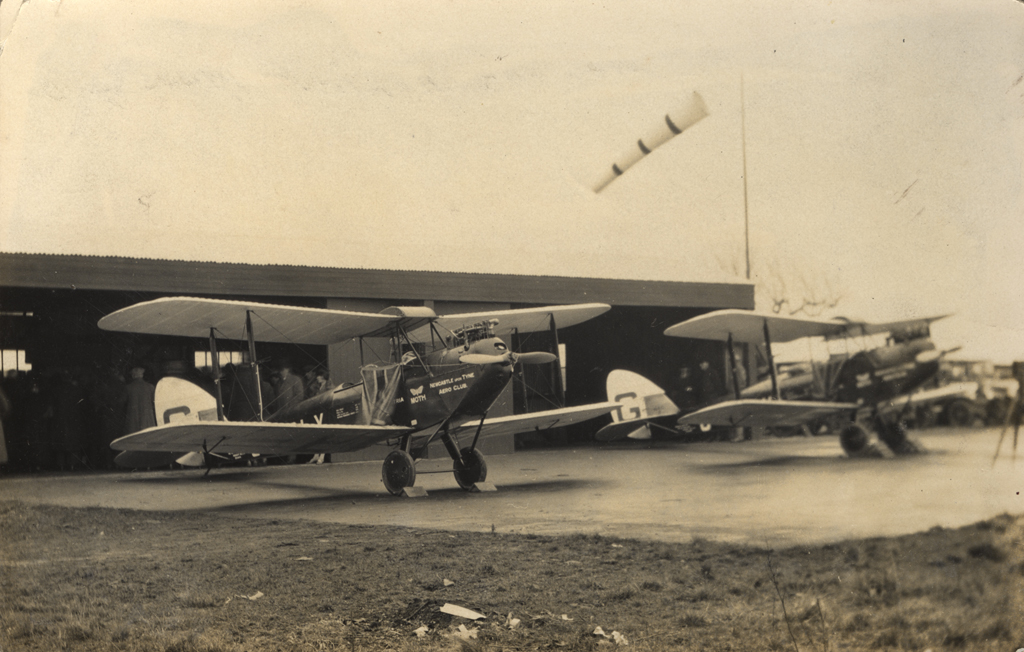
De Havilland DH.60 Cirrus Moths G-EBLX and G-EBLY at Cramlington Aerodrome.

In the early 1920s, the airfield, then known as "Cramlington Aerodrome", or sometimes "Newcastle Airport", saw little use, and the buildings received little maintenance. However in July 1925 The Newcastle upon Tyne Light Aeroplane Club, later renamed the Newcastle on Tyne Aero Club, was formed. It was commonly called the "Newcastle Aero Club". The members funded the building of a new hangar and with a grant from the Air Ministry (Note: Thanks to subsidies organised by the Director of Civil Aviation, Sir Sefton Brancker, five new flying clubs were formed, all receiving two of the earliest production Moths in the summer of 1925. The other clubs were Lancashire Aero Club, London Aeroplane Club, Midland Aero Club and Yorkshire Aeroplane Club.) bought two de Havilland DH.60 Cirrus Moths. The opening ceremony of the club and airfield took place on 21 November that year, along with the naming of the first two aircraft, G-EBLX named 'Novocastria', and G-EBLY, named 'Bernicia'. Officiating was the Lord Mayor of Newcastle, and Sir Sefton Brancker attended. The club remained a loyal Moth operator with at least another six acquired over the following years.

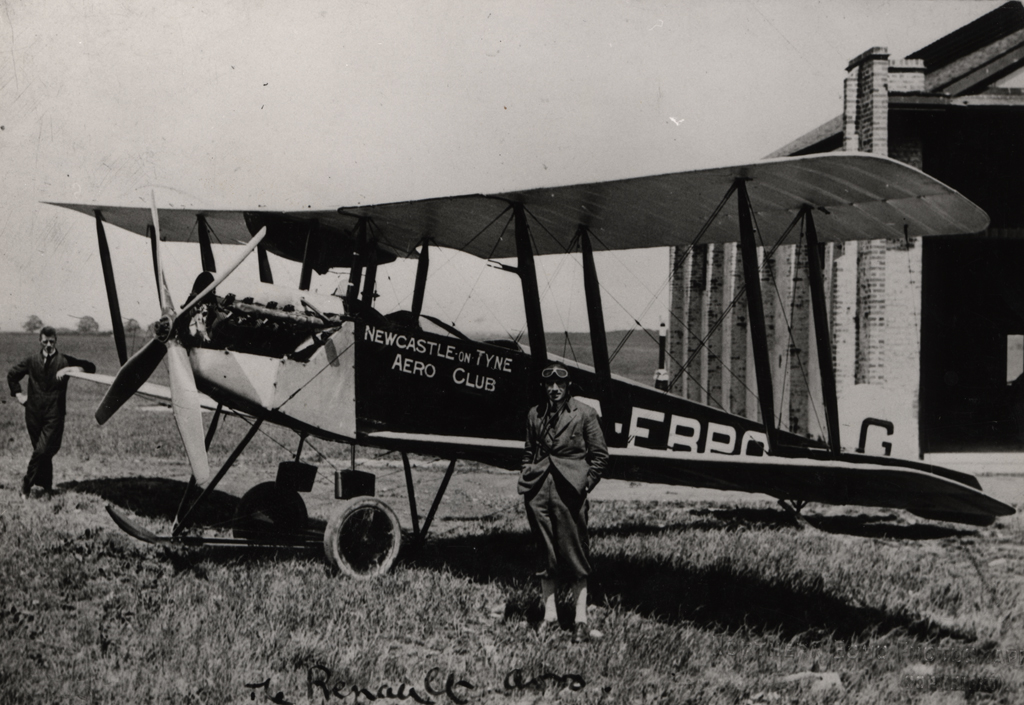
Avro 548 G-EBPO of the Newcastle on Tyne Aero Club at Cramlington Aerodrome c.1928

A small company named Pleasure Flying Services Ltd. operated pleasure flights from early 1929 using Avro 548 G-EBPO, which they acquired from the Aero Club. It was a three-seat conversion of the two-seat Avro 504. (Note: There is film of this aircraft in Pleasure Flying Services markings giving joy rides from the beach at St Andrews, Scotland in 1929.) Later that year they expanded, acquiring Simmonds Spartan two-seater G-AAGV and three-seater G-AAHV. 'GV crashed in September 1930 and was rebuilt as a three-seater re-registered as G-ABXO.

One of the earliest pupils of the Aero Club was Constance "Connie" Leathart, a young socialite who, despite crashing on her first solo flight, 24 February 1926, went on to become an accomplished pilot. With her great friend, Walter Leslie Runciman, 2nd Viscount Runciman of Doxford, they formed Cramlington Aircraft Ltd, and took over the aircraft and business of Pleasure Flying Services on 30 October 1929. The company managed the aerodrome and ran a maintenance and repair operation. It also built gliders from scratch including a Zögling type designed by Mr Alec Bell, and in 1930 designed and built three examples of the Cramlington Cramcraft primary glider.

A president of the Newcastle Aero Club, Sam Smith, was the founder of Ringtons Tea. In 1931 he was a founder member of Newcastle Gliding Club at Cramlington, which mainly used winch-launching for take-offs. The club's president was Walter Leslie Runciman, and they used a Cramlington Cramcraft as a basic trainer.

==== Scheduled services ====
George Nicholson started an experimental service, trading as "Northern Airways", from his base at Cramlington to the Isle of Man (Hall Caine Airport) via Carlisle (Kingstown Municipal Airport) in his De Havilland DH.84 Dragon G-ACFG, running from 1 August 1934 to 30 September. He went on to start Northern & Scottish Airways in Glasgow later that year.

In April 1935, North Eastern Airways started a service to link Edinburgh (Turnhouse) with London (Heston Airport) via Newcastle (Cramlington) and Leeds (Yeadon). The Edinburgh leg was delayed until 27 May. There was little demand, and the service stopped on 27 June.

==== Events ====
The Newcastle Aero Club held its opening ceremony on 26 November 1925, at which its first two Moths were named. It organised its first Annual Flying Meeting on 4 September 1926 in which the Fleet Air Arm took part, with 406 Flight sending a large number of Fairey Flycatchers.

On 7 July 1929, Alan Cobham visited Cramlington on his Municipal Aerodrome Campaign. He judged that the airfield at Newcastle's Town Moor, from which he had operated the previous day, was too rough and dangerous for his de Havilland DH.61 Giant Moth (registered G-AEEV and named Youth of Britain) and had relocated to Cramlington. The engine cut out and he landed, demolishing a tent and running into a wire fence, tearing off a wing, and stopping a few yards from the clubhouse. No one was harmed, and the aircraft was quickly repaired.

On 5 October 1929, three significant air races were held during an Air Pageant; the Air League Challenge Cup, the Grosvenor Challenge Cup, and the SBAC Challenge Cup. They were all won by members of the Newcastle Aero Club in its DH.60 Moth G-EBPT.

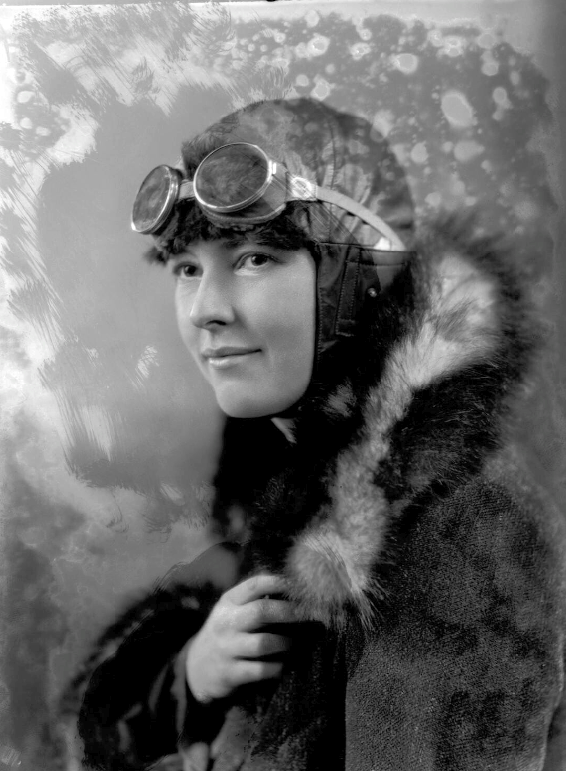
Winifred Brown, winner of the 1930 King's Cup.

The King's Cup Air Race took place on 5 July 1930, and Cramlington was the third of four stops on the circular route which started and finished in Hanworth Air Park in London. With 88 starters, this was to be the largest field in the history of the race, and the 71 aircraft which survived as far as Cramlington all arrived in the space of just over an hour, causing considerable chaos but only two minor accidents.

On 31 August 1930, an Air Fete was held which included a race. The Grosvenor Challenge Cup race was held again on 22 August 1931.

A London to Newcastle Air Race was instituted by the Aero Club, flying from Heston to Cramlington on 30 May 1931. It was repeated, starting from Brooklands in 1932, 1933 and 1934, and the last ones were to Woolsington in 1935 and 36.

Alan Cobham's National Aviation Day "Flying Circus" displays visited Cramlington on the following dates: 2 and 3 July 1932, 1 and 2 July 1933 (No. 2 Tour), 8 September 1934 and 26 and 27 July 1935 (Astra Show). (Note: In 1933 there were two simultaneous tours throughout the season, named Number 1 and Number 2. In 1935 there again were two, but only from 1 July, named Astra and Ferry.)

The British Hospitals Air Pageant visited on 12 August 1933. Among the displays was the unique Miles M.1 Satyr G-ABVG and the De Havilland DH.60M Moth VH-UQA in which C. W. A. Scott made his record-breaking return flights from Australia to Britain.

=== Demise ===
On 26 July 1935, Woolsington Aerodrome opened, about 5 miles (8.0 km) to the south-west, as a great improvement on Cramlington (it would become Newcastle International Airport later). Almost all of Cramlington's users and residents had moved there by May 1936 in which month Cramlington Aircraft ceased trading, and the airfield was left almost deserted. An exception was the Gliding Club, which remained until the outbreak of World War II in September 1939. Cramlington Aircraft Ltd entered voluntary liquidation in January 1939.

During World War II the airfield was unused. After the war, attempts were made to restart some aviation activity, but the airfield was soon abandoned. Little of the old aerodrome remains. The landing ground is now open grassland encroached upon by the Shotton open-cast coal mine. and the buildings area is now the Bassington Industrial Estate.

=== Airship station ===
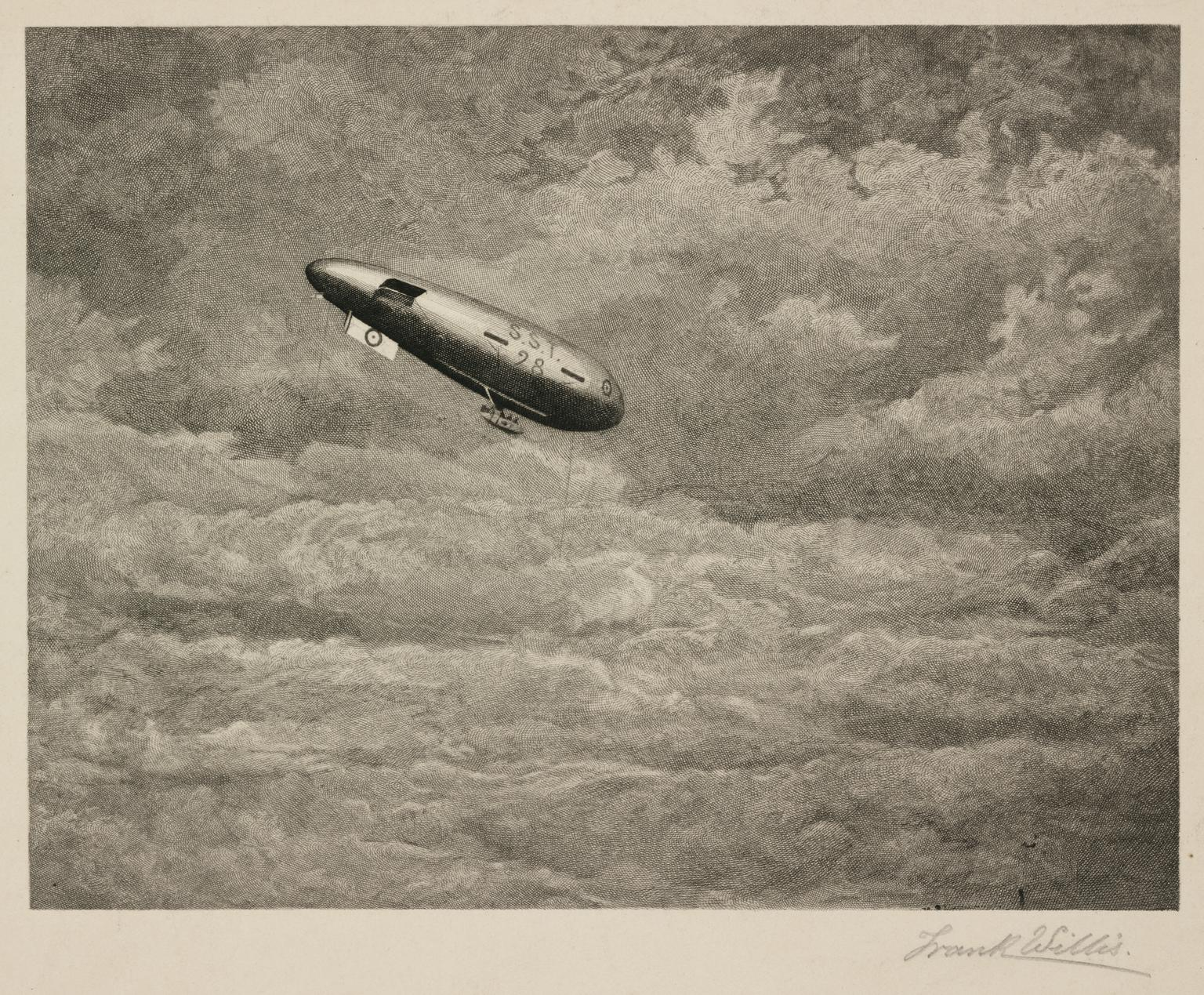
Painting of an RNAS SST on patrol

Construction of a Royal Naval Airship Station, RNAS Cramlington, started in 1918 at Nelson Village, about half a mile (0.8 km) to the east of the existing aerodrome. It was planned that four Submarine Scout Twin (SST) airships would be based here, but construction of the large airship shed to house them was not finished until 1919. However the planned airships did operate from here for a short period, along with a complement of twenty officers and around 280 men.

The site was soon abandoned, but the huge airship shed was taken over by British Airships Ltd which later changed its name to the Airship Development Company. Here they assembled what was claimed to be Britain's first private airship, the AD.1. This had been designed principally by Reginald Foster Dagnall, who had designed previous airships (Note: Dagnall was the designer of Willows airships in the early 1900s.) and founded the RFD company. The airship was built in Guildford, Surrey, but as most airship sheds in Britain had been demolished, it was brought to Cramlington for inflation and testing.

Registered G-FAAX, its first flight was on 18 September 1929 and after several test flights (Note: There is film of an early flight from Cramlington.) was deflated for modifications. Flying again the following May, it performed its intended role in aerial advertising, with large banners attached to its sides. Business was hard to come by, however, and the airship had to travel far to get work. On a commission in Belgium for a cigarette company, it was destroyed in a storm on 5 October 1930. The remains were returned to Britain and auctioned, and the company was liquidated the next year.

The shed was little used until after World War II, but in later years was used for the production of concrete lamp posts, It survived until 1967 when it was demolished. The site is now the South Nelson Industrial Estate.

== Accidents and incidents ==
- On 5 April 1916 RFC BE2c (serial '2739') of 36 (HD) Sqn was sent up to intercept Zeppelin L16. It hit a building on night approach to Cramlington and its bombs exploded, killing the pilot.
- On 2 October 1916 RFC Avro 504A (serial '7970') of 58 Sqn lost speed on a turn and dived in near Cramlington. The pilot was killed.
- On 5 January 1917 RFC Avro 504A (serial 'A555') of 63 Sqn stalled and dived in during the pilot's first solo flight. The pilot was killed.
- On 24 June 1926 (Note: Some sources say the date was 18 June.) Gnosspelius Gull No 2 (unregistered) dived in on landing, killing the pilot, the chief flying instructor at Newcastle Aero Club.
- On 22 February 1927 De Havilland DH.60 Moth (registration G-EBLY) of the Newcastle Aero Club crashed after an engine failure on take-off and was written off. Previously it had crashed on landing on 6 January 1926 and been returned to De Havilland at its base at Stag Lane, London for repair. On 26 November the same year it hit a fence on take-off and was again sent to Stag Lane, returning on 23 January 1927. All incidents happened at Cramlington and none resulted in fatalities.
- On 23 November 1928 a violent storm caused a hangar to collapse, damaging the Aero Club's Moths G-EBLX, G-EBPT and G-EBQV. They were all repaired and returned to service.
- On 1 December 1929 De Havilland DH.60 Moth (registration G-EBPT) of the Newcastle Aero Club was written off when it spun into a quarry during a landing at Cramlington, injuring the two occupants. Just a few weeks earlier it had won three prestigious air races in one day (see Events above). It had previously been damaged in the hangar collapse on 23 November 1928 and been repaired.
- On 20 May 1931 DH.60 Moth (registration G-EBLX) of the Newcastle Aero Club crashed at Blyth, Northumberland on a flight from Cramlington. Water in the fuel caused the engine to fail, and the aircraft stalled and crashed. It was written off, but the two occupants survived.

== In media ==
The Aerodrome is mentioned in The Black Peril, a Biggles novel by W.E. Johns published in 1935.
