= Schuster baronets =

Title in the Baronetage of the UK

Escutcheon of the Schuster baronets of Collingham Road

The Schuster baronetcy, of Collingham Road in the Royal Borough of Kensington, was a title in the Baronetage of the United Kingdom. It was created on 24 July 1906 for the banker Felix Schuster. He was a senior partner in the family firm of Schuster, Son & Co, and was also a finance member of the Council of India from 1906 to 1916.

The 3rd Baronet was a colonel in the Rifle Brigade. The baronetcy became extinct on his death in 1996 leaving no male issue.

== Schuster baronets, of Collingham Road (1906) ==
- Sir Felix Schuster, 1st Baronet (1854–1936)
- Sir (Felix) Victor Schuster, 2nd Baronet (1885–1962)
- Sir (Felix) James Moncrieff Schuster, 3rd Baronet (1913–1996)

== Extended family ==
The physicist Arthur Schuster was an elder brother of the 1st Baronet.

Baronetage of the United Kingdom
Preceded by Runciman baronets	Schuster baronets of Collingham Road; 24 July 1906	Succeeded by Speyer baronets
