= Felix Schuster =

British banker, financier and politician (1854–1936)

Felix Schuster

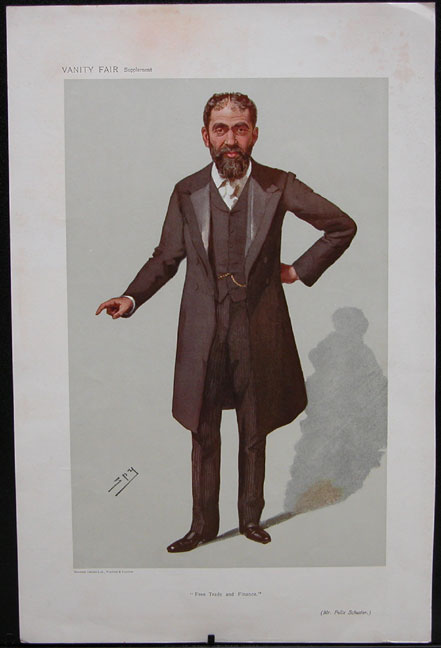
Free Trade and Finance Vanity Fair 28 June 1906

Sir Felix Otto Schuster, 1st Baronet (21 April 1854 — 13 May 1936) was a British banker, financier and Liberal politician.

== Biography ==
Schuster was born in the Free City of Frankfurt in 1854. His father was a merchant banker who converted from Judaism to Christianity. His mother died when he was around four years old. He was educated in Frankfurt, Geneva, and after his family moved to England in 1869, at Owens College, Manchester. He then went into business in London. He was on the Royal Commission on London Traffic 1903–5, Board of Trade Commission for the Amendment of Company Law 1905, India Office Committee on Indian Railway Finance and Administration 1907-8 and Treasury Committee on Irish Land Purchase Finance 1907–8. He was chairman of the Council of the Institute of Bankers, 1908-9, and of the Central Association of Bankers, 1913––5.

In 1906, as a staunch supporter of free trade at the time, he stood as a Liberal candidate at the general election for the constituency of the City of London. He was subject to antisemitic attacks from right-wing forces due to his political views and personal background.

In 1879, Schuster married Meta Weber, and they had five children. His grandchildren include the philosopher Mary Warnock and the diplomat Duncan Wilson.

On 13 May 1936, Schuster died at Ruthin Castle in Wales, from complications of anaemia and hypertension; he was 82.

== Works ==
His works include:

- Foreign Trade and the Money Market
- Our Gold Reserves

== See also ==
- Schuster Baronets
- Arthur Schuster (older brother)

== Notes ==
Baronetage of the United Kingdom
New creation	Baronet (of Collingham Road); 1906–1936	Succeeded by Victor Schuster
