= Oscar Gnosspelius =

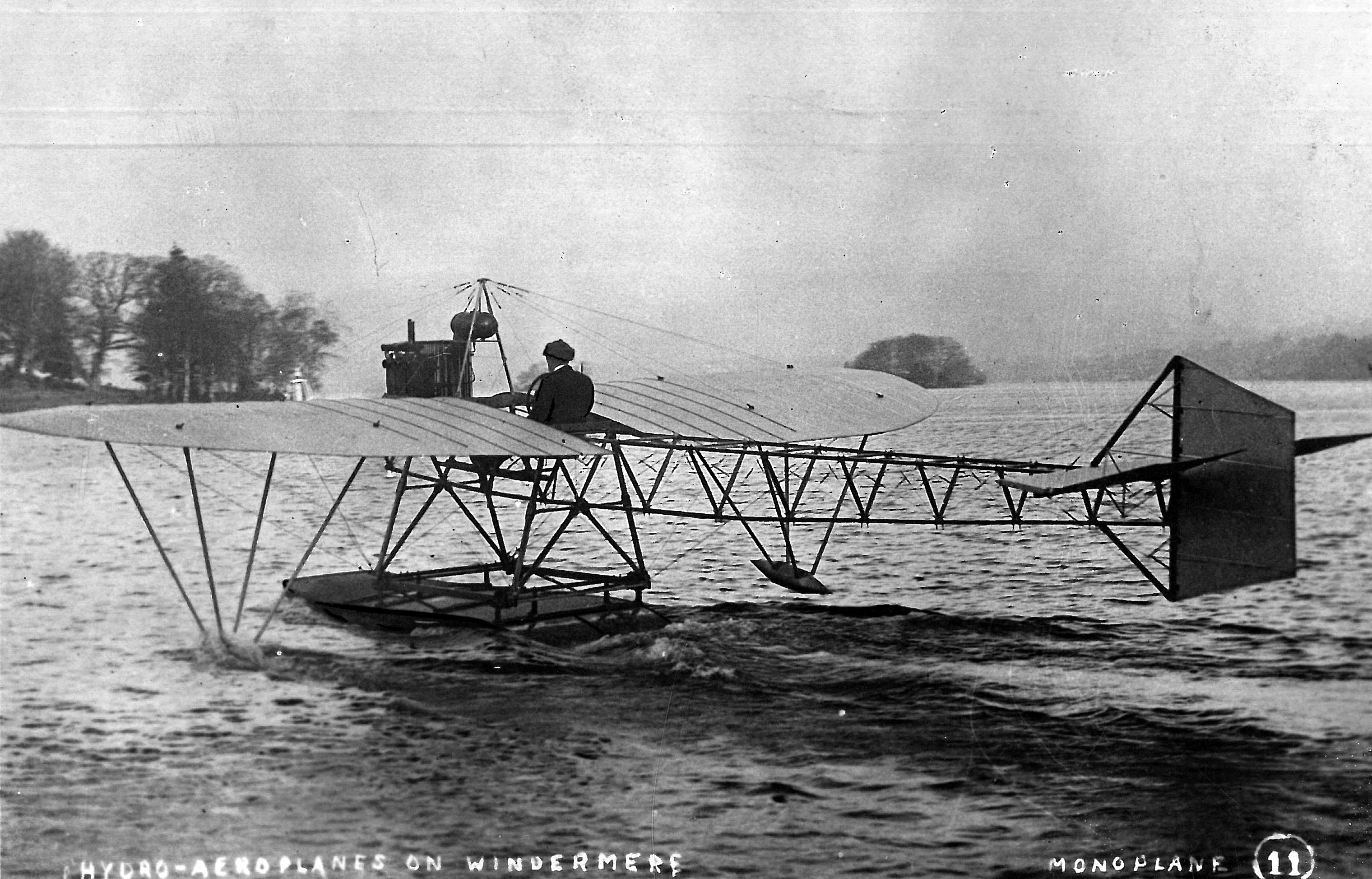
Gnosspelius No. 2 (1912)

Major Oscar Theodor Gnosspelius (10 March 1878 – 17 February 1953) was an English civil engineer and pioneer seaplane builder.

Gnosspelius was born at Brookfield House, Lydiate on 18 March 1878 the only son of Adolf Jonathan Gnosspelius. He was educated in Bedford and later was to study civil engineering at the City and Guilds Central Technical College in South Kensington. Between 1899 and 1902 he was an apprentice to civil engineer Sir Douglas Fox. After working at a quarry in Sweden he spent time in Transvaal and Brazil carrying out land surveys, by 1908 was in Angola working on a railway survey.

In 1910 he had a monoplane floatplane similar to the Bleriot XI and powered by a 20 hp (15 kW) Alveston engine built by Borwick and Sons of Bowness-on-Windemere. This failed to fly, but a second floatplane built in 1911 was successfully flown on 13 February 1912. In 1911 he designed the Lakes Waterhen for the Lakes Flying School.

During the first world war, he was commissioned in the Royal Naval Air Service, later Royal Air Force and was employed on the inspection staff. Between 1918 and 1925 he worked in the test department at Rochester for Short Brothers the seaplane builders. During his time at Shorts he designed an ultralight monoplane the Gnosspelius Gull.

In 1925 he married the artist and sculptor Barbara Collingwood. She was the daughter of the author W. G. Collingwood and her family's friend Arthur Ransome, author of the Swallows and Amazons books, had proposed to her earlier.

Following his marriage, Gnosspelius was involved in prospecting in the Lake District for copper and other minerals. Ransome used the mining and prospecting knowledge of Oscar Gnosspelius featuring him in the 1936 book Pigeon Post as "Squashy Hat" and dedicated the book to him. His daughter modelled for a drawing of Nancy Blackett in the same book.

Gnosspelius died on 17 February 1953 at Coniston, Cumbria.
