= Royal Commission on Criminal Justice =

UK Royal Commission

The Royal Commission on Criminal Justice, also known as the Runciman Commission, was established in London on 14 March 1991 by the Home Secretary for the purpose of examining the English system of criminal justice and making recommendations as to changes that should be made in order increase the efficiency of the system and the effective justice inherent in the process. It took effect in 1993. The Commission was the continuation of Sir John May's inquiry into the false convictions of the Maguire Seven and extension to other miscarriages of justice. Viscount Runciman was the original chairman.

In particular, it was to examine:

1. The behaviour of the police and supervising officers.
2. Proper process of prosecutors
3. Forensic science and the role of professional witnesses.
4. The rights of the accused to a proper defence.
5. The range of powers of the courts in the process, and if the balance is proper.
6. The global efficacy of the process, including process in the right to appeal.

The Royal Commission reported to Parliament in July 1993 and recommended the establishment of an independent body to:

- consider suspected miscarriages of justice
- refer appropriate cases to the Court of Appeal

As a result the Criminal Appeal Act 1995 established the Criminal Cases Review Commission as an executive non-departmental public body. The total expenditure of the Royal Commission was £2 600 000.

== See also ==
- Criminal Cases Review Commission
- Royal Commissions in the United Kingdom
