= Nieuport B.N.1 =

B.N.1

General information
- Type: Fighter
- National origin: United Kingdom
- Manufacturer: Nieuport & General Aircraft
- Designer: Henry Folland
- Status: abandoned prototype
- Number built: 1

History
- First flight: February 1918

The Nieuport B.N.1 was a prototype British single-engined fighter aircraft of the First World War. It was a single-engined biplane intended to replace the Sopwith Camel, but only one was built, being destroyed in a crash. The Sopwith Snipe was built instead to replace the Camel.

== Development and design ==
In 1917, as a result of an official Inquiry (the Burbidge Report) into the activities of the Royal Aircraft Factory, design and construction of aircraft at Farnborough ceased, and the Factory's design teams were broken up. This allowed the Nieuport & General Aircraft Co Ltd, which was formed at Cricklewood, London in 1916 to license produce French Nieuport aircraft, to acquire the services of Henry Folland, previously responsible for the design of the S.E.5 fighter, as chief designer. His first design for Nieuport & General was another fighter, intended to meet Air Board Specification A.1.A for a replacement for the Sopwith Camel, in competition with designs submitted by Sopwith (the Sopwith Snipe), Austin Motors (the Austin Osprey) and Boulton & Paul (the Bobolink).

This aircraft, designated Nieuport B.N.1 (for "British Nieuport"), was a single-engined, single seat tractor biplane of wooden construction. It had equal-span, unstaggered two bay wings, a slab-sided fuselage and was powered by a 230 hp (172 kW) Bentley BR2 rotary engine. A distinctive feature was a ventral fin, as used on the S.E.5 (which was to become a distinguishing mark of many of Folland's designs). Armament was the normal pair of synchronised Vickers machine guns together with a Lewis gun mounted on the upper wing, firing over the propeller.

Three B.N.1s were ordered, the first one flying in February 1918. When it was evaluated, it demonstrated performance that was generally superior to the Snipe, with a much better ceiling. It was destroyed, however, on 10 March 1918 when its engine (only the sixth BR2 built) caught fire in the air. This caused the B.N.1 to be abandoned, with the Snipe being purchased to replace the Camel, and Folland concentrating on the design of the more advanced Nieuport Nighthawk.

== Specifications ==
Data from The British Fighter since 1912.

General characteristics

- Crew: One
- Length: 18 ft 6 in (5.64 m)
- Wingspan: 28 ft 0 in (8.53 m)
- Height: 9 ft 0 in (2.74 m)
- Wing area: 260 sq ft (24 m^{2})
- Gross weight: 2,030 lb (921 kg)
- Fuel capacity: 36 imp gal (43 US gal; 160 L)
- Powerplant: 1 × Bentley BR2 9-cylinder rotary engine, 230 hp (170 kW)
- Propellers: 2-bladed wood fixed pitch propeller

Performance

- Maximum speed: 127 mph (204 km/h, 110 kn) at 15,000 ft (4,600 m)
- Endurance: 3 hr
- Service ceiling: 26,000 ft (7,900 m) (absolute ceiling)
- Time to altitude: 16 min to 15,000 ft (4,600 m)

Armament

- Guns: 2 x forward firing, synchronised .303 in (7.7 mm) Vickers machine guns and one .303 in (7.7 mm) Lewis gun above upper wing

== See also ==
Related development

- Nieuport Nighthawk

Aircraft of comparable role, configuration, and era

- Sopwith Snipe
- Boulton Paul Bobolink
- Austin Osprey
- Armstrong Whitworth Armadillo
