= Sopwith Snipe =

British WW1 biplane fighter aircraft

7F.1 Snipe
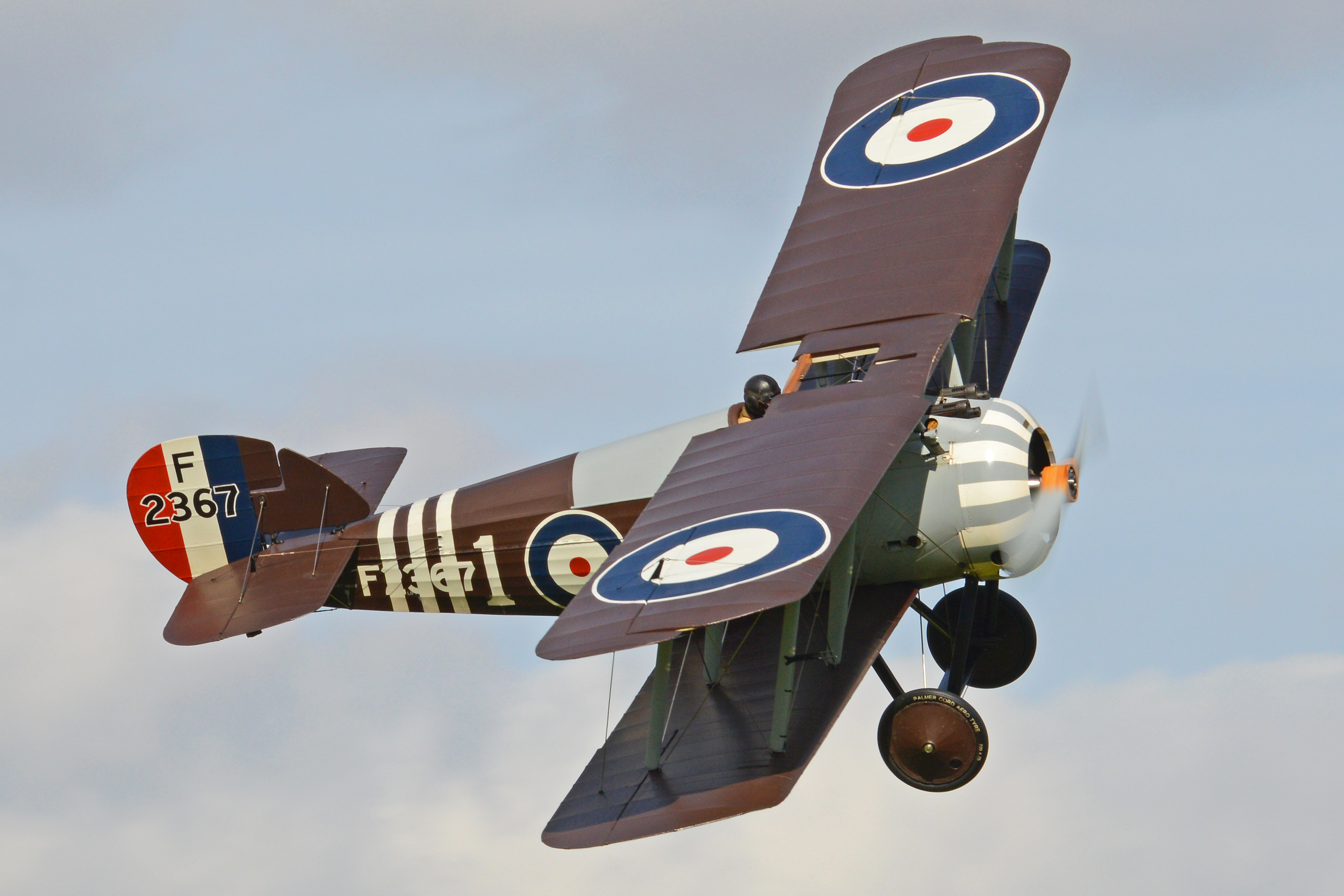
- A Sopwith 7F.1 Snipe replica

General information
- Type: Fighter
- Manufacturer: Sopwith Aviation Company
- Designer: Herbert Smith
- Primary users: Royal Air Force Australian Flying Corps; Canadian Air Force
- Number built: 497

History
- Introduction date: 1918
- First flight: October 1917
- Variants: Sopwith Salamander; Sopwith Dragon

The Sopwith 7F.1 Snipe is a British single-seat biplane fighter of the Royal Air Force (RAF). It was designed and built by the Sopwith Aviation Company during the First World War, and came into squadron service a few weeks before the end of the conflict, in late 1918. The Snipe was not a fast aircraft by the standards of its time, but its excellent climb performance and manoeuvrability made it a good match for contemporary German fighters. It was selected as the standard postwar single-seat RAF fighter and the last examples were not retired until 1926.

== Design and development ==
In April 1917, Herbert Smith, the chief designer of the Sopwith Company, began to design a fighter intended to be the replacement for Sopwith's most famous aeroplane, the Camel. The design, the Snipe, was in its initial form a single-bay biplane, slightly smaller than the Camel and intended to be powered by similar engines. (Note: Alternative engines proposed included the 150 hp (110 kW) Bentley AR.1 (later known as the Bentley BR.1), the 150 hp (110 kW) Gnome Monosoupape, the 130 hp (97 kW) Clerget 9B or 110 hp (82 kW) Le Rhône 9J.) The pilot sat higher than in the Camel while the centre-section of the upper wing was uncovered, giving a better view from the cockpit. Armament was to be two Vickers machine guns. In the absence of an official order, Sopwith began construction of two prototypes as a private venture in September 1917. This took advantage of a licence that had been granted to allow construction of four Sopwith Rhino bomber prototypes, only two of which were built. The first prototype Snipe, powered by a Bentley AR.1 rotary engine was completed in October 1917.

The second prototype was completed with the new, more powerful Bentley BR.2, engine, which gave 230 hp (170 kW) in November 1917. This promised better performance and prompted an official contract for six prototypes to be placed, including the two aircraft built as private ventures. The third prototype to fly, serial number B9965, had modified wings, with a wider centre-section and a smaller cut-out for the pilot, while the fuselage had a fully circular section, rather than the slab-sided one of the first two aircraft and the tail was smaller. It was officially tested in December 1917, reaching a speed of 119 mph (192 km/h) and was then rebuilt with longer-span [30 ft (9.1 m)] two-bay wings (compared with the 25 ft (7.6 m) single bay wings). This allowed the Snipe to compete for Air Board Specification A.1(a) for a high-altitude single-seat fighter. This specification required a speed of at least 135 mph (217 km/h) at 15,000 ft (4,600 m) and a ceiling of at least 25,000 ft (7,600 m) while carrying an armament of two fixed and one swivelling machine gun. An oxygen supply and heated clothing were to be provided for the pilot to aid operation at high altitude. The Snipe was tested against three other fighter prototypes, all powered by the Bentley BR.2 engine: the Austin Osprey triplane, the Boulton & Paul Bobolink and the Nieuport B.N.1. While there was little difference in performance between the aircraft, the Sopwith was selected for production, with orders for 1,700 Snipes placed in March 1918.

The Snipe's structure was heavier but much stronger than earlier Sopwith fighters. Although not a fast aircraft for 1918, it was very manoeuvrable and much easier to handle than the Camel, with a superior view from the cockpit - especially forwards and upwards. The Snipe had a superior rate of climb and much better high-altitude performance compared with its predecessor, allowing it to fight Germany's newer fighters on more equal terms. Further modifications were made to the Snipe during the war and afterwards. The Snipe was built around the Bentley BR2 engine - the last rotary to be used by the RAF. It had a maximum speed of 121 mph (195 km/h) at 10,000 ft (3,000 m) compared with the Camel's 115 mph (185 km/h) at the same altitude and an endurance of three hours. Its fixed armament consisted of two 0.303 in (7.7 mm) Vickers machine guns on the cowling and it was also able to carry up to four 25 lb (11 kg) bombs for ground attack, identical to the Camel's armament. The design allowed for a Lewis gun to be mounted on the centre section in a similar manner to those carried by the Dolphin but this was not fitted to production aircraft.

Production began in 1918, with more than 4,500 being ordered but ended in 1919, with just under 500 being built, the rest being cancelled due to the end of the war. There was only one variant, the Snipe I, with production by several companies including Sopwith, Boulton & Paul Ltd, Coventry Ordnance Works, D. Napier & Son, Nieuport and Ruston, Proctor and Company. Two aircraft were re-engined with a 320 hp (240 kW) ABC Dragonfly radial engine and these entered production as the Sopwith Dragon. An armoured version entered production as the Sopwith Salamander.

== Operational history ==
=== First World War ===
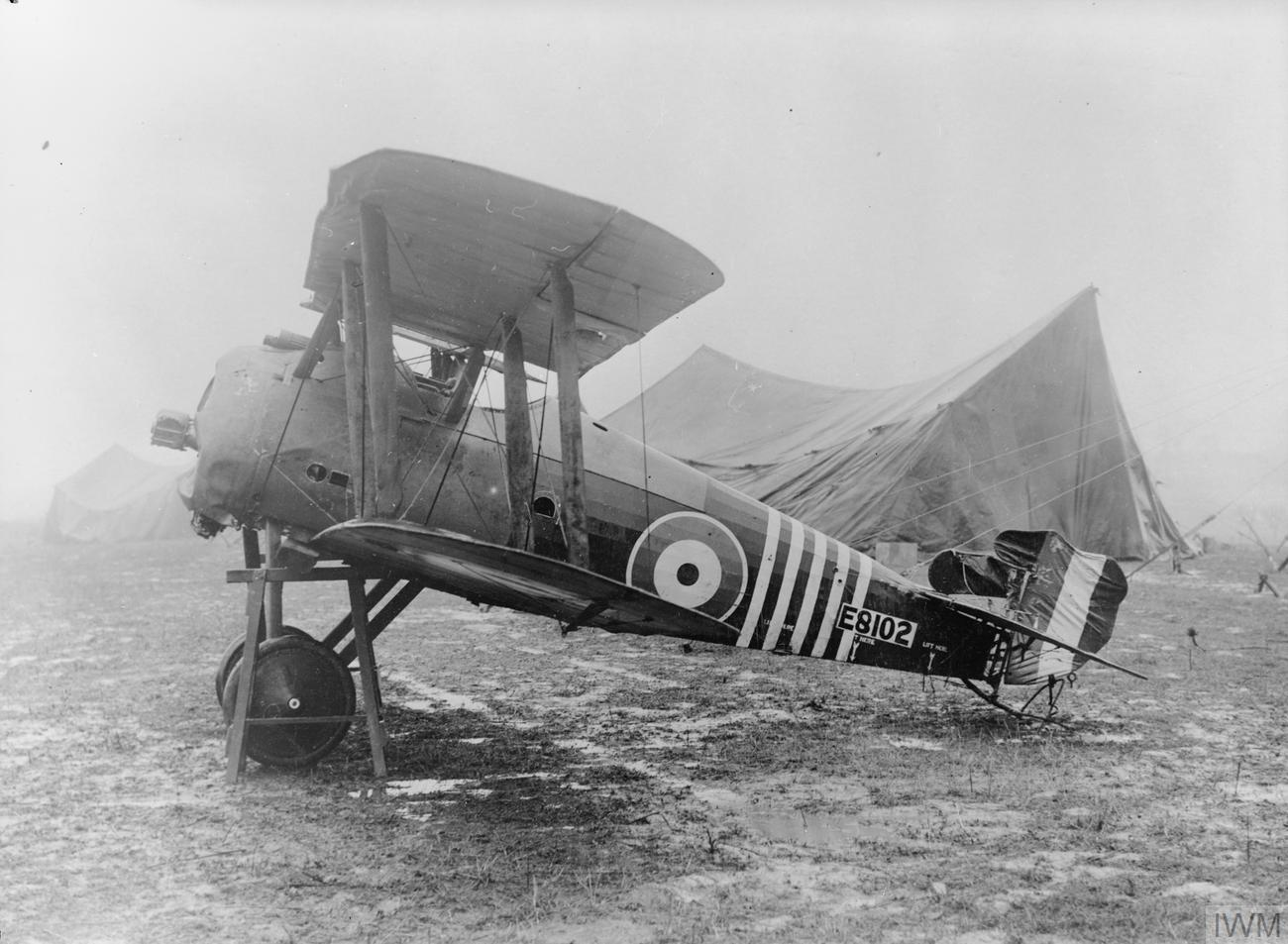
William George Barker's Snipe

In March 1918, an example was evaluated by No.1 Aeroplane Supply Depot (No.1 ASD) at St-Omer in France. Lieutenant Leslie Hollinghurst (later an ace in Dolphins and an air chief marshal) flew to 24,000 ft (7,300 m) in 45 minutes. He stated that the aircraft was tail heavy and had "a very poor rudder", but that otherwise manoeuvrability was good.

The first squadron to equip with the new fighter was 43 Squadron, based at Fienvillers in France, which replaced its Camels with 15 Snipes on 30 August 1918. After spending much of September training, it flew its first operational patrols equipped with the Snipe on 24 September. The Snipe also saw service with 4 Squadron Australian Flying Corps (AFC) from October 1918. While 43 Squadron's Snipes saw relatively little combat, the Australians had more success, claiming five victories on 26 October and six on 28 October, while on 29 October, 4 Squadron claimed eight Fokker D.VIIs destroyed and two more driven down out of control for the loss of one of 15 Snipes. 208 Squadron converted from Camels in November, too late for the Snipes to see action.

One of the most famous incidents in which the Snipe was involved occurred on 27 October 1918 when Canadian Major William Barker attached to 201 Squadron flew over the Forêt de Mormal in France. Barker's Snipe (No. E8102) had been brought with him for personal evaluation purposes in connection with his UK-based training duties and was therefore operationally a "one-off". The engagement with enemy aircraft occurred at the end of a two-week posting to renew his combat experience as Barker was returning to Britain. While on his last operation over the battlefields of France, he attacked a German two-seater aircraft and swiftly shot it down. He was soon attacked by a formation of at least 15 Fokker D.VIIs, an aircraft widely considered to be the best German fighter of the First World War. The ensuing melee was observed by many Allied troops. In the engagement, he was wounded three times, twice losing consciousness momentarily, but managing to shoot down at least three D.VIIs before making a forced landing on the Allied front lines. Barker was awarded the Victoria Cross for this action. The fuselage of this Snipe is preserved at the Canadian War Museum in Ottawa, Ontario, Canada.

=== Postwar operations ===
Following the Armistice with Germany that ended the First World War, Snipes formed part of the British Army of the Rhine, returning to the United Kingdom in August and September 1919, while Snipes replaced Camels in four home defence squadrons based in the United Kingdom. This force was quickly run down and by the end of 1919, only 80 Squadron was equipped with the Snipe.

In 1919, the Snipe took part in the Allied intervention on the side of the White Russians during the Russian Civil War between the Bolsheviks and the counterrevolutionaries, twelve Snipes being used by the RAF mission in north Russia. At least one of the RAF Snipes was captured by the Bolsheviks and pressed into service. The Snipe of 25 Squadron and 56 Squadron were sent to Turkey during the Chanak Crisis in September 1922, flying demonstration flights over Constantinople to deter Turkish forces from attacking British forces in the Dardanelles. 1 Squadron was moved to Iraq in 1922, flying ground attack missions against Kurdish forces led by Sheikh Mahmud Barzanji until the squadron was disbanded in November 1926.

Although the performance demonstrated by the Snipe was unimpressive (tests at Martlesham Heath in October 1918 had shown that the Snipe was inferior to the Martinsyde F.3 and Fokker D.VII), it was selected as the standard postwar single-seat fighter of the RAF. The Martinsyde Buzzard development of the F.3 being 25 per cent more expensive than the Snipe and relying on a French engine that was in short supply (the 300 hp (220 kW) Hispano-Suiza 8), while the range of fighters powered by the ABC Dragonfly radial engine did not come to fruition owing to failure of that engine. Snipes remained in squadron service as a fighter with the RAF until 1926 and was used as a trainer by the RAF until 1927. It was declared obsolete in 1928. The Canadian Air Force operated the Snipe after the war, but it was phased out in 1923, a year before the Royal Canadian Air Force (RCAF) was formed.

== Operators ==
Australia

- Australian Flying Corps
  - No. 4 Squadron AFC in France.
  - No. 5 (Training) Squadron AFC in the United Kingdom.
  - No. 8 (Training) Squadron AFC in the United Kingdom.

Brazil

- Brazilian Naval Aviation operated 12 Snipes.

Canada

- Canadian Air Force
  - No. 1 Squadron RCAF

Soviet Union

- Soviet Air Force - Postwar.

United Kingdom

- Royal Flying Corps / Royal Air Force

  - No. 1 Squadron RAF
  - No. 3 Squadron RAF
  - No. 17 Squadron RAF
  - No. 19 Squadron RAF
  - No. 23 Squadron RAF
  - No. 25 Squadron RAF
  - No. 29 Squadron RAF
  - No. 32 Squadron RAF
  - No. 37 Squadron RAF
  - No. 41 Squadron RAF
  - No. 43 Squadron RAF
  - No. 45 Squadron RAF
  - No. 56 Squadron RAF
  - No. 70 Squadron RAF
  - No. 78 Squadron RAF
  - No. 80 Squadron RAF
  - No. 81 Squadron RAF
  - No. 111 Squadron RAF
  - No. 112 Squadron RAF
  - No. 143 Squadron RAF
  - No. 201 Squadron RAF
  - No. 208 Squadron RAF

== Surviving aircraft and reproductions ==
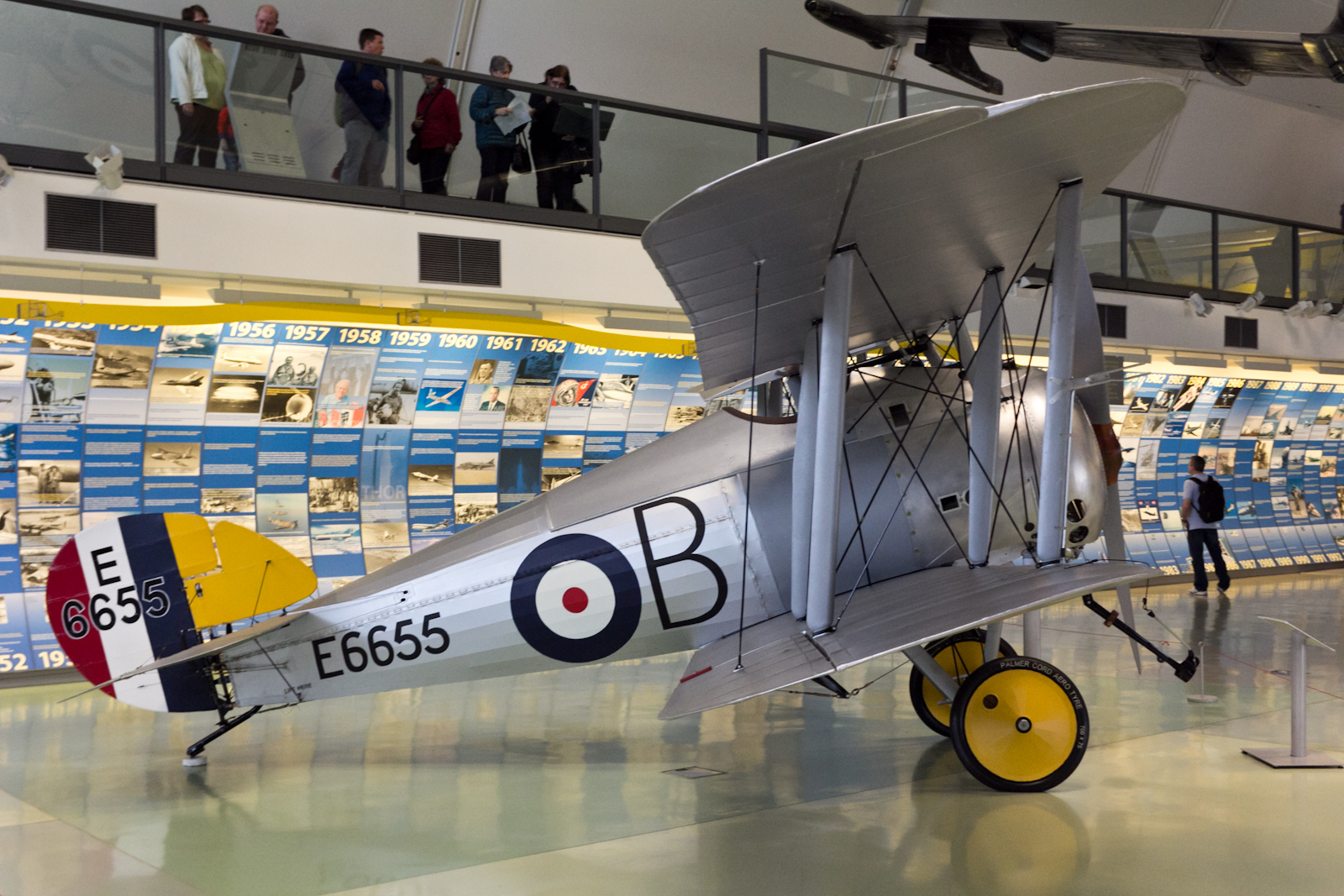
E6655 at the Royal Air Force Museum London

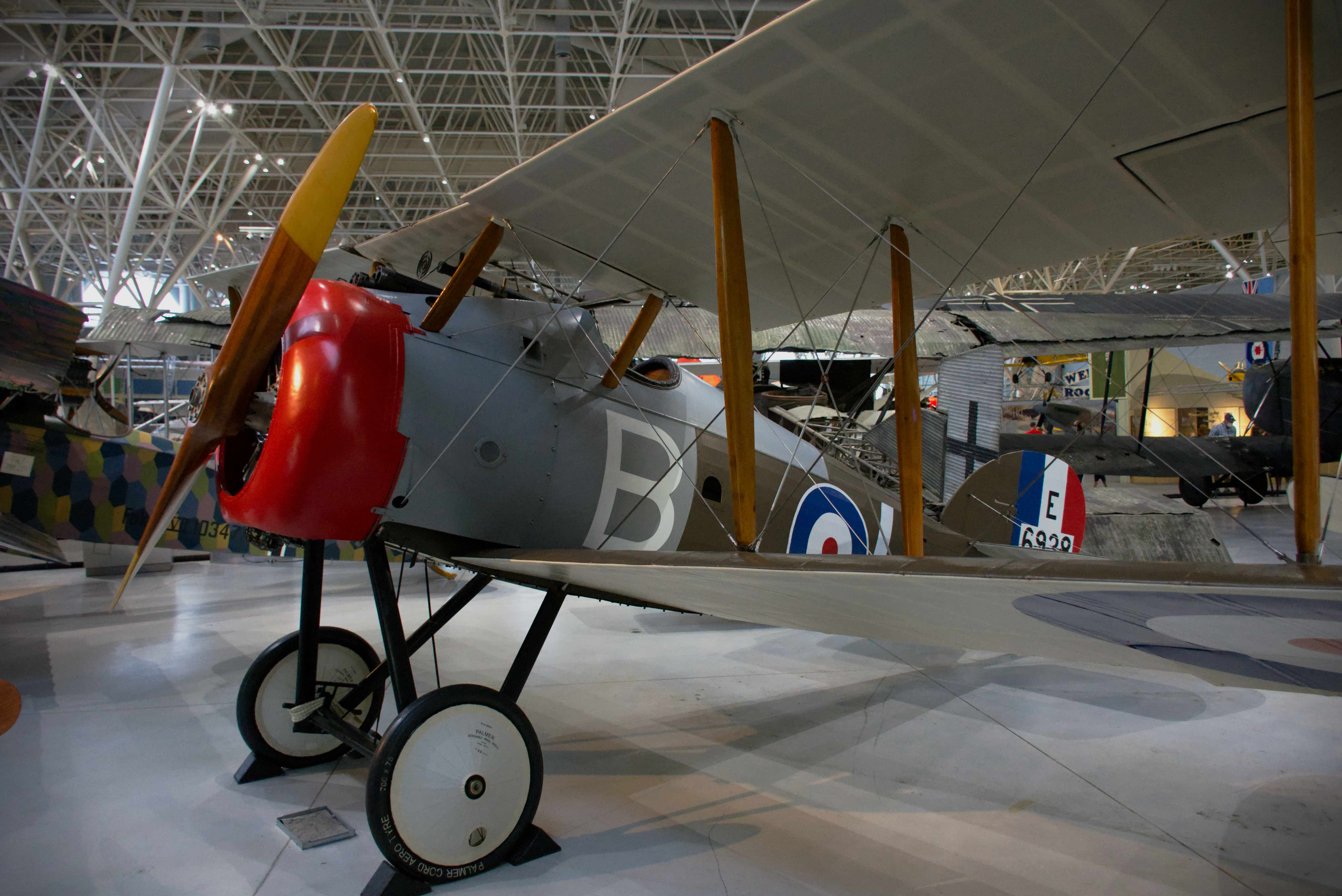
E6938 at the Canada Aviation and Space Museum, Ottawa

Two complete, original, Sopwith Snipes survive. E6938 is displayed in the Canada Aviation and Space Museum in Ottawa. Formerly owned by film star Reginald Denny, it was restored in the 1960s.

E8105 is exhibited at the National Air and Space Museum in Washington, D.C. Previously, it had been at the Old Rhinebeck Aerodrome, in Rhinebeck, New York. It passed to the NASM after Cole Palen's death in December 1993. The fuselage (minus landing gear, engine and cowl) of Major William G. Barker's Snipe, E8102 is on display at the Canadian War Museum, Ottawa.

=== Reproductions ===
Antique Aero in California has completed construction of an airworthy, very detailed reproduction Sopwith Snipe. It awaits a new-build 230-horsepower (170 kW) Bentley B.R.2 engine.

Another Snipe reproduction marked as E8102 was built in New Zealand by The Vintage Aviator Ltd., and was subsequently purchased by Kermit Weeks for his Fantasy of Flight aviation museum in Polk City, Florida. This is airworthy and uses an original Bentley rotary engine.

The RAF Museum in August 2012 took delivery of a static display reproduction of the Snipe. Marked E6655, it was constructed in the Wellington workshops of The Vintage Aviator Ltd. in New Zealand. The inclusion of original, non-airworthy parts precludes this aircraft from flight status.

The first reproduction was built by Richard Lincoln Day of Colonia, NJ. This Snipe, marked as E6837, flew for one summer at the Old Rhinebeck Aerodrome, in Rhinebeck, NY before being purchased by Doug Champlin for his collection in Mesa, Arizona. This collection was later donated to the Museum of Flight in Seattle, Washington.

Tyabb Airport in Victoria, Australia, hosts a reproduction snipe VH-SNP E8050. The aircraft first flew on 17 October 2014, and is powered by a W670 Radial. This snipe has since been relocated to the RAAF Museum in Point Cook, Victoria

== Specifications (Snipe) ==
Data from British Aeroplanes 1914–18.

General characteristics

- Crew: 1
- Length: 19 ft 10 in (6.05 m)
- Upper wingspan: 31 ft 1 in (9.47 m)
- Lower wingspan: 30 ft 0 in (9.14 m)
- Height: 9 ft 6 in (2.90 m)
- Wing area: 271 sq ft (25.2 m^{2})
- Empty weight: 1,312 lb (595 kg)
- Gross weight: 2,020 lb (916 kg)
- Fuel capacity: 38.5 imp gal (46.2 US gal; 175 L)
- Powerplant: 1 × Bentley BR2 nine-cylinder rotary engine, 230 hp (170 kW)
- Propellers: 2-bladed fixed-pitch propeller

Performance

- Maximum speed: 121 mph (195 km/h, 105 kn) at 10,000 ft (3,000 m)
- Endurance: 3 hr
- Service ceiling: 19,500 ft (5,900 m)
- Time to altitude:
  - 5 min 10 s to 6,500 ft (2,000 m)
  - 18 min 50 s to 15,000 ft (4,600 m)
- Wing loading: 7.4 lb/sq ft (36 kg/m^{2})

Armament

- Guns: 2 × 0.303 in (7.7 mm) Vickers machine guns
- Bombs: 4 × 25 lb (11 kg) bombs

== See also ==
Related development

- Sopwith Salamander
- Sopwith Dragon

Aircraft of comparable role, configuration, and era

- Boulton Paul Bobolink
- Nieuport B.N.1
- Austin Osprey
- Armstrong Whitworth Armadillo

Related lists

- List of aircraft of the Royal Air Force
