= Boulton Paul Bobolink =

P.3 Bobolink
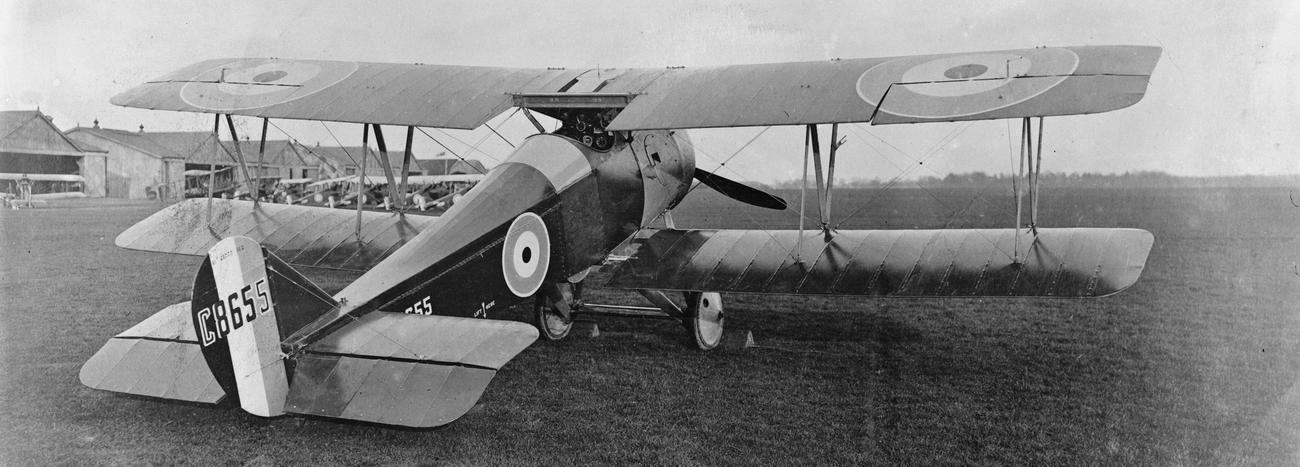

General information
- Type: Single-seat Fighter
- Manufacturer: Boulton & Paul Ltd
- Status: Prototype
- Number built: 1

History
- First flight: 1918

The Boulton & Paul P.3 Bobolink was a World War I British single-engined single-seat fighter aircraft. It was built by Boulton & Paul Ltd.

== Development and design ==
The Bobolink was the first aeroplane designed by Boulton & Paul Limited of Norwich. The company was a manufacturer of wooden buildings but during World War I it, like many other companies, built aircraft under Ministry contracts. Aircraft built included the Sopwith 1½ Strutter and Sopwith Camel.

The British Air Ministry requested proposals to replace the Sopwith Camel. Boulton & Paul designed and constructed the Bobolink and entered it in that competition. The prototype first flew in early 1918, undergoing official trials in March of that year.

The Bobolink had two-bay biplane wings and was powered by the same Bentley BR2 rotary engine as used by the competing Sopwith Snipe. An unusual feature of the aircraft was the use of jettisonable fuel tanks. These were fitted behind the pilot and separated by a sheet of armour, allowing an individual tank to be jettisoned in the event of a fire. While the Bobolink and Snipe had similar performance, the Snipe was easier to build, while the Bobolink was claimed to have poor ground handling, with the Snipe winning the Camel replacement competition. Only a single prototype was produced.

== Specifications ==
Data from War Planes of The First World War, Volume 1

General characteristics

- Crew: 1
- Length: 20 ft 0 in (6.10 m)
- Wingspan: 29 ft 0 in (8.84 m)
- Height: 8 ft 4 in (2.54 m)
- Wing area: 266 sq ft (24.7 m^{2})
- Empty weight: 1,226 lb (556 kg)
- Gross weight: 1,992 lb (904 kg)
- Fuel capacity: 40 imp gal (48 US gal; 180 L)
- Powerplant: 1 × Bentley BR2 nine-cylinder rotary engine, 230 hp (170 kW)

Performance

- Maximum speed: 125 mph (201 km/h, 109 kn) at 10,000 ft (3,000 m)
- Endurance: 3 hr 15 min
- Service ceiling: 19,500 ft (5,900 m)
- Time to altitude: 9 min 20 s to 10,000 ft (3,000 m)

Armament

- Guns:
  - 2 × fixed forward firing 0.303 in (7.7 mm) Vickers machine guns
  - Provision for 1× Lewis gun mounted over the centre-section of the upper wing

== See also ==
Aircraft of comparable role, configuration, and era

- Armstrong Whitworth Armadillo
- Austin Osprey
- Nieuport B.N.1
- Sopwith Snipe
