= Gnosspelius Gull =

Gull
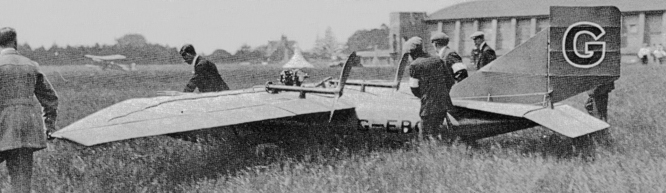
- Gnosspelius Gull (G-EBGN), Lympne, 1923

General information
- Type: Ultra-light monoplane
- National origin: United Kingdom
- Manufacturer: Short Brothers
- Designer: Oscar Gnosspelius
- Number built: 2

History
- First flight: 26 May 1923

The Gnosspelius Gull was a 1920s British experimental ultra-light monoplane designed by Major O.T. Gnosspelius and built by Short Brothers at Rochester for the 1923 Lympne light aircraft trials.

== Development ==
Gnosspelius was head of the research department of Short Brothers, for whom he had devised an ingenious mechanism for testing aerofoil sections, the Gnosspelius Aerodynamic Pendulum. Tests using this had indicated that incorporating a small step into the upper surface of the wing at the point of its greatest thickness would reduce drag, and Gnosspelius had started work on the design of a small glider using this discovery when, in early 1923, two prizes intended to promote the development of light aircraft were announced.

He accordingly revised his design to use a 679 cc Blackburne Tomtit V-twin motorcycle engine, driving a pair of chain-driven 4 ft (1.2 m) diameter pusher propellers running at two-thirds of the engine speed. The resulting aircraft was a single-seat high-wing monoplane with a circular section monocoque fuselage made of spruce planking built up over elm hoops, with spruce frames for local reinforcement. The wing used the RAF 19 section, modified by the inclusion of a 3/8 in (10 mm) step in the upper surface. The thin wing section dictated the use of four spars, these being box sections with spruce flanges and 3-ply webs, and was built in three sections, the sections outboard of the propeller shafts being removable for ease of transportation. The wing had a parallel-chord centre section and outer sections with the leading edge swept-back to meet the fourth wing spar at the tip. The engine was mounted on duralumin bearers between the two centre spars. Wide-span ailerons were hinged to the rearmost wing spar, operated by torque-tubes with dog clutches at the junction between the centre section and the removable outer panels. The fixed undercarriage consisted of a pair of wheels on a short axle carried inside the fuselage, the lower part of the wheels projecting through slots.

Two aircraft were built by Shorts and the first one, registered G-EBGN, first flew on 26 May 1923 piloted by Short test pilot John Lankester Parker. The second aircraft was unregistered and was flown at Lympne as No. 19; it crashed at Cramlington on 18 June 1926 killing the pilot.

== Specifications ==
Data from

General characteristics

- Crew: 1
- Length: 19 ft 6 in (5.94 m)
- Wingspan: 36 ft 4 in (11.07 m)
- Airfoil: RAF 19
- Empty weight: 360 lb (163 kg)
- Gross weight: 570 lb (259 kg)
- Powerplant: 1 × Blackburne Tomtit V-twin, 26 hp (19 kW)

Performance

- Maximum speed: 70 mph (110 km/h, 61 kn)
- Cruise speed: 45 mph (72 km/h, 39 kn)
