= Cambridge Centre for the Future of Democracy =

Research centre

The Cambridge Centre for the Future of Democracy is a research institute at the University of Cambridge founded by David Runciman and Roberto Stefan Foa in January 2020. Centre reports rely upon data synchronization to merge and combine public opinion data from across the world and over time in order to reveal generalizable trends in global attitudes.

The work of the centre is cited in books by authors such as Martin Wolf, Yascha Mounk, Alastair Campbell, Gideon Rachman, and Moises Naim. In addition to media coverage, the centre is notable for engagement with global policy and decision makers, including the Biden administration Summit for Democracy, the 2022, 2023 and 2024 Council of Europe World Forum for Democracy, the Carnegie Endowment for International Peace, and the 2024 Report of the Barcelona Centre for International Affairs.

== Public reports ==
At its launch, the Centre released a report examining worldwide trends in satisfaction with democracy since the late twentieth century. The finding that democratic legitimacy had reached a fifty-year low led to coverage in the BBC, The Atlantic, and Politico. A second event was held two weeks later with Canadian politician Michael Ignatieff.

With the onset of the COVID-19 pandemic, the Centre switched from live events to press releases, podcasts, videos and data feeds to publications including the Financial Times and The Economist. The centre's second annual report, on the topic of youth and democracy, revealed declining satisfaction across generations. On its release, it reached coverage in The Guardian, Financial Times, The Times, the Daily Telegraph, Reuters, CNN, and the BBC.

A third report was released in January 2022 in partnership with the Luminate Group and YouGov examining how the global COVID-19 pandemic had affected support for democracy, political trust, and populism, and was widely covered across UK and global media. In the wake of the war in Ukraine, the Centre released its fourth report a year later, examining trends in global attitudes towards the United States, Russia and China, finding a growing divide between western democracies and the Global South.

Since 2023, the centre's work has focused on the war in Ukraine, including published and non-published reports for the UK government and international partners, as well as academic publications in partnership with the Pew Research Center.
