= Sopwith Grasshopper =

Grasshopper

General information
- Type: Two-seat touring biplane
- National origin: United Kingdom
- Manufacturer: Sopwith Aviation Company
- Number built: 1

History
- First flight: 1920

The Sopwith Grasshopper was a British two-seat touring biplane built by the Sopwith Aviation and Engineering Company at Kingston upon Thames in 1919.

== Development ==
The Grasshopper was a conventional two-seat open-cockpit biplane, with a nose-mounted 100 hp (75 kW) Anzani engine. Only one aircraft was built, registered G-EAIN, which obtained its Certificate of Airworthiness in March 1920. It passed through a number of private operators until 1929 when the Certificate was not renewed. The last owner had been Constance Leathart.

== Specifications ==
Data from

General characteristics

- Crew: 1
- Capacity: 1
- Length: 23 ft 1 in (7.04 m)
- Wingspan: 33 ft 1 in (10.09 m)
- Height: 9 ft 0 in (2.74 m)
- Wing area: 312 sq ft (30.0 m^{2})
- Gross weight: 1,670 lb (758 kg)
- Powerplant: 1 × Anzani 10 , 100 hp (75 kW)

Performance

- Maximum speed: 90 mph (144 km/h, 78 kn)
