= Thockrington =

Village in Northumberland, England

Coordinates: 55.110°N 2.072°W

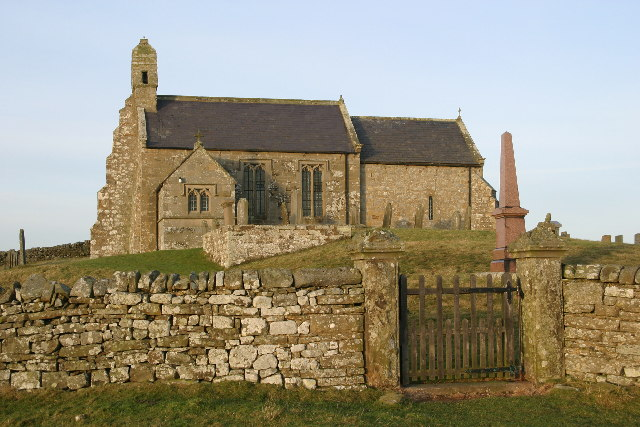
- St. Aidan's Church

- Location within Northumberland
- OS grid reference: NY955795
- Civil parish: Bavington
- Unitary authority: Northumberland
- Ceremonial county: Northumberland
- Region: North East
- Country: England
- Sovereign state: United Kingdom
- Post town: HEXHAM
- Postcode district: NE48
- Police: Northumbria
- Fire: Northumberland
- Ambulance: North East
- UK Parliament: Hexham

Thockrington is a village and former civil parish, now in the parish of Bavington, in Northumberland, England. The village lies about 10 miles (16 km) north of Hexham. In 1951 the parish had a population of 18.

== Governance ==
Thockrington is in the parliamentary constituency of Hexham. The parish was abolished on 1 April 1955 to form Bavington.

== Religious sites ==
Thockrington church, which stands so prominently on a spur of the Great Whin Sill, is one of the oldest churches in the county. The church is dedicated to St Aidan.

Here are buried several members of the ancient family of Shafto, the earliest mention of whom is in 1240. The Shaftos lived at nearby Bavington until the eighteenth century when, as a result of their support of the Jacobite cause in 1715, their estates were confiscated by the Crown, and ultimately sold to a Delaval. The Shaftos had connections with the county of Durham and lived on their Durham estates until 1953, when Mr R. D. Shafto returned to Bavington Hall.

== Landmarks ==
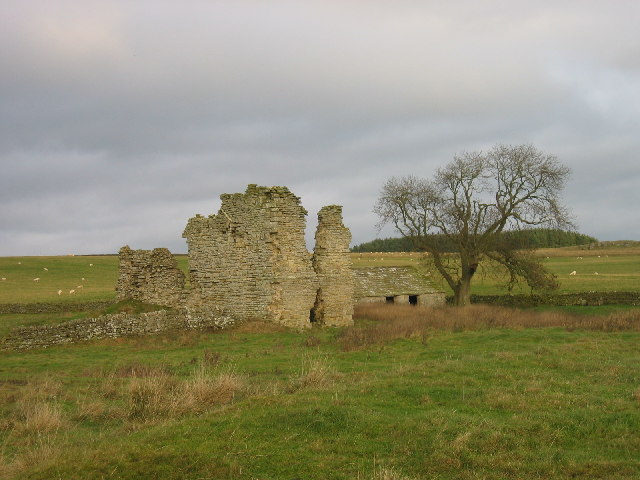
Little Swinburne Tower

A little over a mile south-west of the village are the ruins of Little Swinburne Tower, a fifteenth-century pele tower.

== Notable people ==
- Lord Beveridge, founder of the modern welfare state, is buried in the churchyard.
- The author Tom Sharpe's ashes were buried in the churchyard in 2014 by his Spanish partner, witnessed by a Spanish TV crew. Sharpe's father was once vicar of Thockrington.
- The aviator, Connie Leathart (1903–1993), is buried here; her remains are marked by a simple stone bearing the initials "CL".

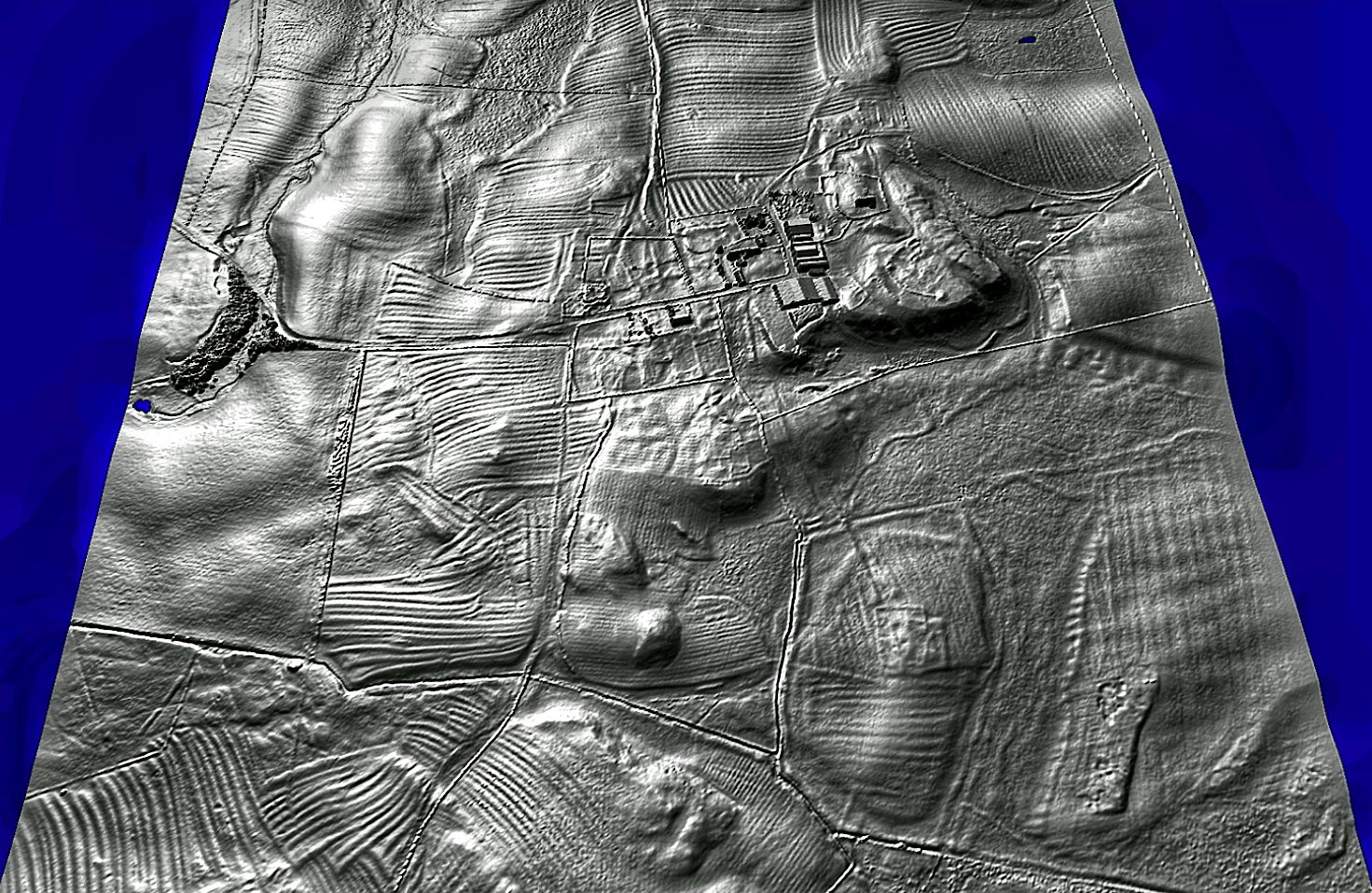
A lidar view of the village.
