= Viscount Runciman of Doxford =

Viscountcy in the Peerage of the United Kingdom

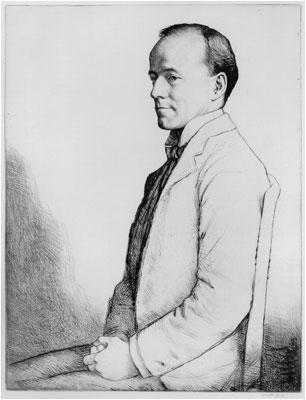
Walter Runciman, 1st Viscount, etching by William Strang, 1913

Viscount Runciman of Doxford, of Doxford in the County of Northumberland, is a title in the Peerage of the United Kingdom. It was created in 1937 for the Honourable Walter Runciman, a politician whose career included service as a Member of Parliament, President of the Board of Trade and Lord President of the Council. He was the son and heir apparent of the shipping magnate and Liberal politician Walter Runciman, who had been created a Baronet in the Baronetage of the United Kingdom in 1906 and Baron Runciman, of Shoreston in the County of Northumberland, in 1933, also in the Peerage of the United Kingdom. As his father was still alive at the time of the creation of the viscountcy the title of this peerage was Runciman of Doxford rather than simply Runciman. As of 2020 the titles are held by the first Viscount's great-grandson David, the fourth Viscount, who succeeded his father in 2020. He is a well-known political scientist at the University of Cambridge.

Hilda Runciman, Viscountess Runciman of Doxford, wife of the first Viscount, represented St Ives, Cornwall, in the House of Commons from 1928 to 1929. Also, the Honourable Sir Steven Runciman, younger son of the first Viscount and Hilda, Viscountess Runciman of Doxford, was a noted historian.

== Barons Runciman (1933) ==
- Walter Runciman, 1st Baron Runciman (1847–1937)
- Walter Runciman, 2nd Baron Runciman (1870–1949) (had been created Viscount Runciman of Doxford in 1937)

== Viscounts Runciman of Doxford (1937) ==
- Walter Runciman, 1st Viscount Runciman of Doxford (1870–1949)
- Walter Leslie Runciman, 2nd Viscount Runciman of Doxford (1900–1989)
- Walter Garrison Runciman, 3rd Viscount Runciman of Doxford (1934–2020)
- David Walter Runciman, 4th Viscount Runciman of Doxford (b. 1967)

== Arms ==
Coat of arms of Viscounts Runciman of Doxford
Crest A seahorse erect gules, holding in the fore fins a thistle as in the arms. Escutcheon Per fess or and azure a lymphad oars in action, the sail charged with a thistle leaved and slipped proper, flags flying to the dexter gules. Supporters On either side a seahorse or gorged with a chain pendent therefrom a grappling iron azure. Motto "By sea"

Baronetage of the United Kingdom
Preceded by Huntington baronets	Runciman baronets of Doxford; 23 July 1906	Succeeded by Schuster baronets
