= Leslie Runciman, 2nd Viscount Runciman of Doxford =

British businessperson (1900–1989)

The Right Honourable The Viscount Runciman of Doxford OBE AFC
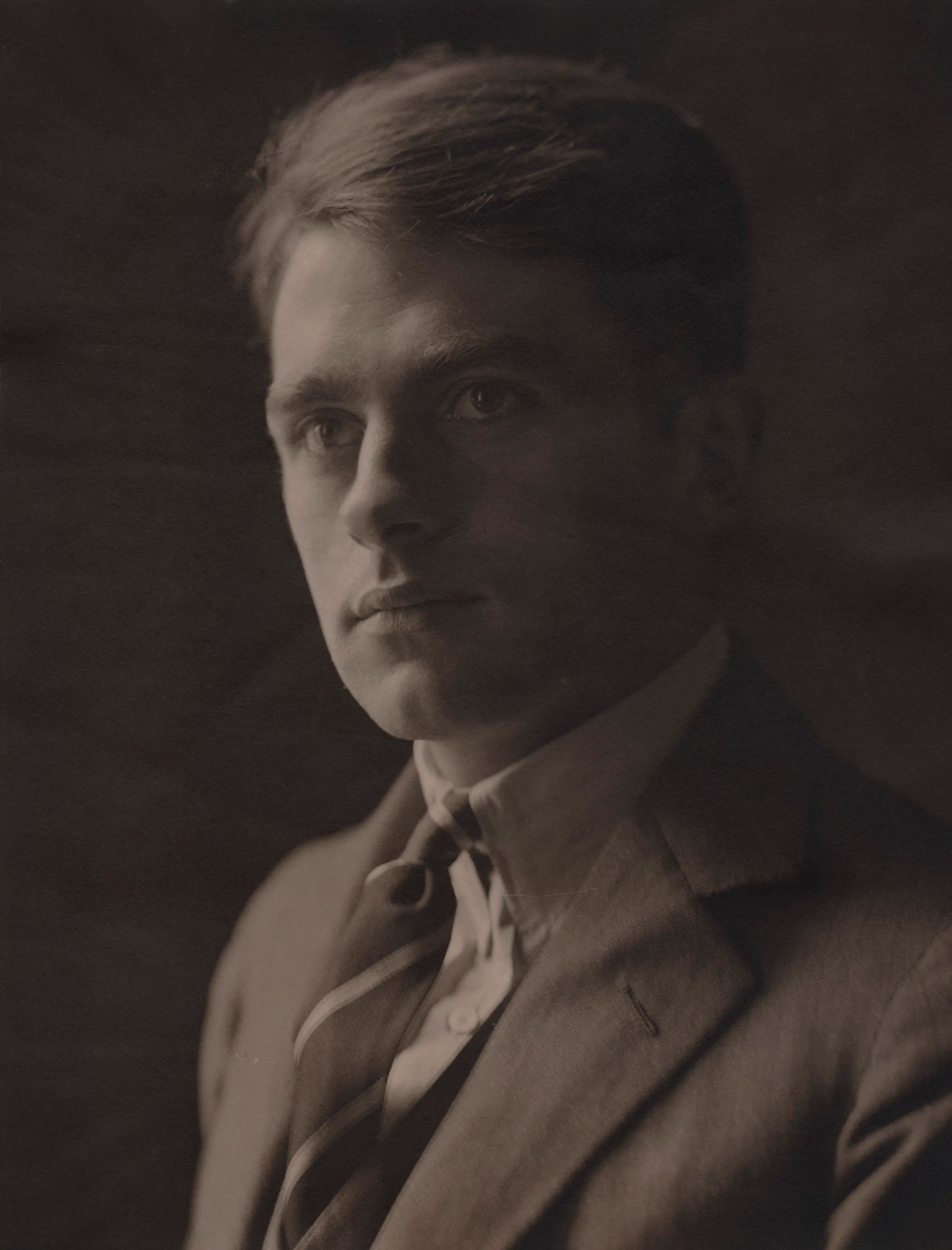
- Portrait by Olive Edis, c. 1925

Member of the House of Lords
- Lord Temporal
- In office 28 November 1949 – 1 September 1989
- Preceded by: The 1st Viscount Runciman
- Succeeded by: The 3rd Viscount Runciman

Personal details
- Born: Walter Leslie Runciman; 26 August 1900
- Died: 1 November 1989 (aged 89)
- Party: Conservative
- Spouses: Rosamond Nina Lehmann (m. 1923; div. 1928) Katherine Schuyler Garrison (m. 1932)
- Children: Walter Garrison Runciman
- Parent(s): Walter Runciman, 1st Viscount Runciman of Doxford; Hilda Stevenson
- Education: Trinity College, Cambridge
- Military career
- Allegiance: United Kingdom
- Service: Royal Air Force
- Service years: 1930–1939; 1943–1946
- Rank: Squadron Leader
- Commands: No. 607 (County of Durham) Squadron
- Conflicts: Second World War
- Awards: Officer of the Order of the British Empire; Air Force Cross

Walter Leslie Runciman, 2nd Viscount Runciman of Doxford (26 August 1900 – 1 September 1989), was a prominent member of the Runcimans, a well-known Newcastle ship-owning and political family.

== Background ==
Runciman was the eldest son of the politician Walter Runciman (later 1st Viscount Runciman of Doxford) and Hilda Stevenson. He was born in Newcastle upon Tyne and grew up at Doxford Hall. He was educated at Summer Fields School, Eton College and Trinity College, Cambridge. In 1937 he was awarded the Air Force Cross. He was awarded the OBE in 1946 for war service. On his father's death in 1949 he succeeded to the title Viscount Runciman of Doxford (created in 1937). The distinguished historian the Hon. Sir Steven Runciman was his younger brother.

== Career ==
After graduating from Cambridge, Runciman joined the family shipping business, later becoming chairman of the company. He trained as a pilot and was Commanding Officer of No. 607 (County of Durham) Squadron of the Auxiliary Air Force from 1930 to 1939. He also partnered with Constance Leathart in forming Cramlington Aircraft Ltd, which ran Cramlington Aerodrome as well as producing a primary glider in the early 1930s. From 1940 to 1943, he was the first Director-General of the British Overseas Airways Corporation (BOAC). From then until 1946, he was Air Attaché in Tehran. Post-war, Runciman served on many business and public organisations mainly related to shipping and air transport. He was a Trustee of the National Maritime Museum at Greenwich from 1955, acting as chairman from 1962 to 1972. A lifelong yachtsman, he was Commodore of the Royal Yacht Squadron from 1968 to 1974 and of Royal Northumberland Yacht Club from 1946 to 1976 when he was promoted Admiral for life.

== Family ==
Runciman married novelist Rosamond Nina Lehmann in 1923. They were divorced in 1928 and he remarried Katherine Schuyler Garrison in 1932. Their only child, the Hon. Walter Garrison Runciman, later 3rd Viscount Runciman of Doxford, was born in 1934.

== Honours ==
- 1937: Air Force Cross
- 1946: Officer of the Order of the British Empire
- 1949: Baronet, 3rd baronet, of Doxford (cr. 1906)

=== Honorary military appointments ===
- 1939–1957: Honorary Air Commodore, 607 (County of Durham) Squadron, RAuxAF

== Arms ==
Coat of arms of Leslie Runciman, 2nd Viscount Runciman of Doxford
Crest A seahorse erect gules, holding in the fore fins a thistle as in the arms. Escutcheon Per fess or and azure a lymphad oars in action, the sail charged with a thistle leaved and slipped proper, flags flying to the dexter gules. Supporters On either side a seahorse or gorged with a chain pendent therefrom a grappling iron azure. Motto By sea

Peerage of the United Kingdom
Preceded by Walter Runciman	Viscount Runciman of Doxford; 1949–1989; Member of the House of Lords (1949–1989)	Succeeded by Garry Runciman
