= Ruth Runciman =

Ruth Runciman, Viscountess Runciman of Doxford DBE (née Hellman; born 9 January 1936), known as Dame Ruth Runciman, is a former Chair of the British Mental Health Act Commission.

== Early life ==
Ruth Hellman was born to a Jewish family and educated at Roedean School in Johannesburg, and the Witwatersrand University, also in Johannesburg, where she gained a baccalaureate degree. She then matriculated at Girton College, Cambridge, in England.

== Career ==
Runciman became active in public life after marriages and children. In 1981, she was one of the founders of the Prison Reform Trust and was responsible for setting up a full-time Citizens' Advice Bureau in Wormwood Scrubs, the first full-time independent advice agency in any prison. She also became a Trustee of the Pilgrim Trust and the National AIDS Trust (now known as NAT), and chaired it from 2000 to 2006.

For more than three decades, Runciman worked with the Citizens Advice Bureau and made significant contributions to work on drug misuse.

She was Chair of Central and North West London NHS Foundation Trust for more than ten years, retiring at the end of 2013.

== Personal life ==
Between 1959 and 1962 she was married to Denis Mack Smith, a Cambridge historian of the Italian "Risorgimento".

In 1963, she married the British sociologist Walter Garrison Runciman, becoming Viscountess Runciman of Doxford, a title she does not use. Runciman died on 10 December 2020. Their son David, who then inherited the peerage, was until 2024 a professor of politics at the University of Cambridge.

== Honours ==
- Officer of the Order of the British Empire, 1991.
- Dame Commander of the Order of the British Empire, 1998, for services to mental health.
- Honorary Fellow of the University of Central Lancashire, 2000.
