= Bavington =

Village and civil parish in Northumberland, England

Coordinates: 55.100°N 2.009°W

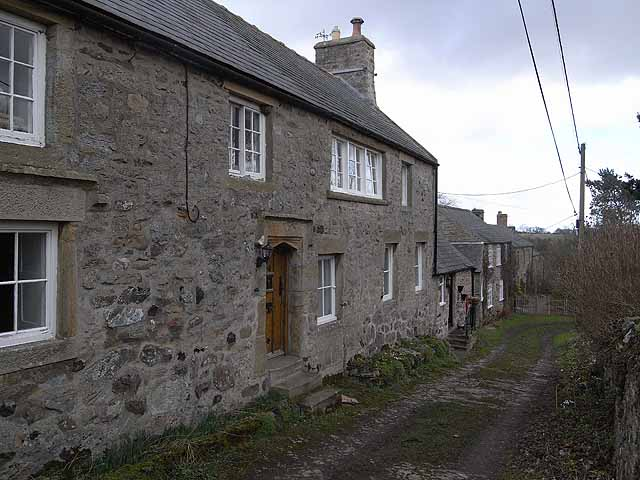
- Great Bavington village centre

- Location within Northumberland
- Population: 99 (2001 census)
- OS grid reference: NY995785
- Unitary authority: Northumberland
- Ceremonial county: Northumberland
- Region: North East
- Country: England
- Sovereign state: United Kingdom
- Post town: NEWCASTLE UPON TYNE
- Postcode district: NE19
- Dialling code: 01830
- Police: Northumbria
- Fire: Northumberland
- Ambulance: North East
- UK Parliament: Hexham

Bavington is a civil parish in Northumberland, England. The parish includes the villages of Great Bavington, Little Bavington and Thockrington. According to the 2001 census it had a population of 99 people. The population taken at the 2011 census remained less than 100. Information is therefore included in the parish of Kirkwhelpington. It is 16 miles (26 km) north of Hexham, and about the same west from Morpeth.

== Governance ==
Bavington is in the parliamentary constituency of Hexham. The parish was formed on 1 April 1958 from Great Bavington, Hawick, Little Bavington, Sweethope and Thockrington parishes.

== Notable people ==
Bavington (anciently "Babington") was the original seat of the prominent Babington family, originally de Babington. Sir John de Babington, Lord of Babington Parva (now Bavington), in the county of Northumberland was alive in 1178 and 1220 and the family remained there for at least five generations before migrating south to Derbyshire, Yorkshire, Nottingham, Cambridge and Devon.

In 1794, the Northumberland mathematician and astronomer Henry Atkinson began running Bavington school when he was only thirteen. According to John Stokoe in his "Songs and Ballads of Northern England" (1893), the song Bobby Shaftoe is connected by tradition with one of the Shaftoes of Bavington, who ran away to sea to escape the attentions of a lady of beauty and fortune. The poet Kathleen Raine spent her younger days living in the manse in Great Bavington.

== See also ==
- Bavington Hall
