= Birtley, Northumberland =

Village in Northumberland, England

Coordinates: 55.0953°N 2.1951°W

Birtley
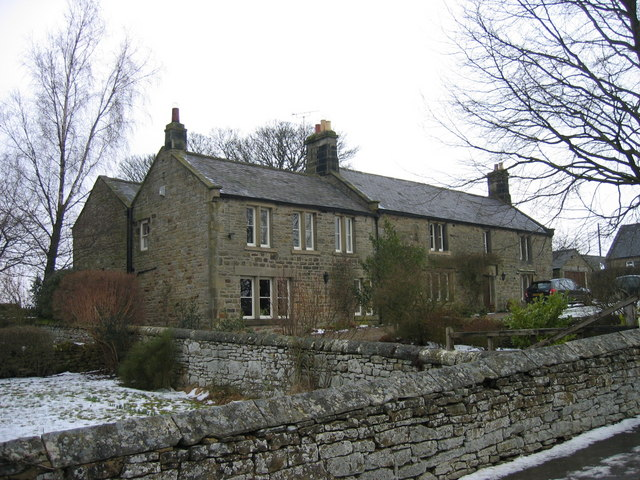
- Manor House, Birtley

- Location within Northumberland
- Population: 172 (2011)
- OS grid reference: NY876778
- Civil parish: Birtley
- Unitary authority: Northumberland
- Ceremonial county: Northumberland
- Region: North East
- Country: England
- Sovereign state: United Kingdom
- Post town: HEXHAM
- Postcode district: NE48
- Dialling code: 01434
- Police: Northumbria
- Fire: Northumberland
- Ambulance: North East
- UK Parliament: Hexham

Birtley is a village and civil parish in Northumberland, England southeast of Bellingham. It is about 10 miles (16 km) north of Hexham.

== Religious sites ==
The Church of St Giles in Birtley features an inscribed stone on the north wall of the chancel with a cross and letters ORPE, dated to about 700AD, the cross bars at the end of the arms resembling the Lindisfarne Gospels. It is a Grade II* listed building. The north wall of the chancel and nave masonry is 12th century and it was restored in 1884. One side of the church is without windows.

== Sources ==
- Rowland, TH (1994). Anglo Saxon Northumbria. Warkworth: Sandhill Press Ltd. ISBN 0 946098 34 4.
