= Cramlington Cramcraft =

British single-seat glider, 1930

Cramcraft

General information
- Type: Basic training glider
- National origin: United Kingdom
- Manufacturer: Cramlington Aircraft Ltd., Northumberland
- Number built: c.3

History
- First flight: c.5 October 1930

The Cramlington Cramcraft was a simple, single-seat, primary training glider, designed and built in the United Kingdom by Cramlington Aircraft Ltd. at Cramlington Aerodrome in 1930. About three were built.

== Design and development ==
The Cramcraft was a single-seat primary glider trainer, aimed at newcomers to the sport and designed with simplicity, robustness and low cost in mind rather than aerodynamic performance. It was a wooden aircraft with wings of rectangular planform built around two box spars which, like the ribs, were made from spruce and plywood. Ailerons reached to the wing tips but no airbrakes were fitted. The tail surfaces were carried on a narrow, flat boom formed by two parallel beams from the wing leading edge, braced together and fabric covered. Both the boom-mounted tailplane and elevators it carried were rectangular in plan, though the latter had a cutout for rudder movement and extended beyond the tailplane. The rudder was mounted on a very narrow fin and initially extended further below the boom than above but was later modified so that little projected below and the upper profile became more rounded.

Initially the pilot's seat was mounted well below the wing leading edge on the narrow edge of a board or plank. The under edge of this board was shaped to curve up forwards and served as a skid. The board was fixed to the wing spars by two pairs of parallel V-form lift struts, the angle between them being unusually small. This arrangement left the pilot completely exposed and a later version placed him in a short nacelle. Both wings and tail were further wire braced, with lift wires from the fuselage and above from a pair of inverted V-struts mounted on the two boom beams.

== Operational history ==
The first serious testing was on 5 October 1930. Several pilots flew the Cramcraft, though no flights of more than 30 seconds were achieved that day. It is probable that three Cramcrafts were built, at least one of them flying with the Newcastle Gliding Club and another with the Sunderland club, both near to Cramlington.

== Specifications (early version) ==
Data from Ellison

General characteristics

- Crew: 1
- Length: 17 ft 0 in (5.18 m)
- Wingspan: 33 ft 6 in (10.21 m)
- Wing area: 151 sq ft (14.0 m^{2})
- Aspect ratio: 7.6
- Empty weight: 140 lb (64 kg)
