= David Runciman =

English academic and podcaster

The Right Honourable The Viscount Runciman of Doxford FBA FRSL
- Born: David Walter Runciman; 1 March 1967 (age 59); St John's Wood, London, England
- Occupations: Academic, author, podcaster
- Spouse(s): Bee Wilson (m. 1997; div. 2021) Helen Lyon-Dalberg-Acton (m. 2021)
- Children: 3
- Parent(s): Garry Runciman; Ruth Runciman

Academic background
- Education: Eton College
- Alma mater: Trinity College, Cambridge

Academic work
- Institutions: Trinity Hall, Cambridge

David Walter Runciman, 4th Viscount Runciman of Doxford (born 1 March 1967), is an English academic and podcaster who until 2024 taught politics and history at the University of Cambridge, where he was Professor of Politics. From October 2014 to October 2018 he was also head of the Department of Politics and International Studies.

In April 2024 he decided to resign his position at the university to focus on his podcast full-time. He was subsequently made Honorary Professor of Politics.

== Family and early life ==
Runciman was born in St John's Wood, North London, England, and grew up there. His father, Garry Runciman, 3rd Viscount Runciman, was a political sociologist and academic and his mother, Ruth Runciman, is former chair of the UK Mental Health Commission, a founder of the Prison Reform Trust, and former chair of the National Aids Trust.

He was educated at Eton College, an all-boys public school in Berkshire, where he won the Newcastle Scholarship. He went on to study at Trinity College, Cambridge.

== Career ==
=== Academic ===
In October 2014, he was appointed head of the Department of Politics and International Studies at the University of Cambridge. Runciman gave his inaugural lecture on 24 February 2015 on Political Theory and Real Politics in the Age of the Internet. He was preceded in this position by Andrew Gamble and Geoffrey Hawthorn.

In 2018, Runciman was elected Fellow of the British Academy (FBA). In 2021, he was elected Fellow of the Royal Society of Literature (FRSL).

In 2020, Runciman co-founded the Cambridge Centre for the Future of Democracy, a research institute dedicated to the exploration of innovative approaches to the study of democratic governance worldwide.

=== Writing ===
Runciman began writing for the London Review of Books in 1996 and has written dozens of book reviews and articles on contemporary politics since, for the LRB and other publications.

Runciman has published eight books. An adaptation of his PhD thesis was published in 1997 as Pluralism and the Personality of the State. The Politics of Good Intentions: History, Fear and Hypocrisy in the New World Order (2006) evaluates contemporary and historical crisis in international politics after 9/11 while Political Hypocrisy (2008) explores the political uses of hypocrisy from a historical perspective. The Confidence Trap: A History of Democracy in Crisis from World War I to the Present (2013) lays out his theory of the threat of democratic overconfidence. Profile Books published his books Politics: Ideas in Profile and How Democracy Ends in 2014 and 2018, respectively. In 2021 he published Confronting Leviathan: A History of Ideas, looking at thinkers and ideas in modern politics.

Runciman's book Politics: Ideas in Profile explores what politics is, why do we need it and where is it heading.

After a negative book review in The Guardian of Antifragility by Nassim Nicholas Taleb, Taleb referred to Runciman as the "second most stupid reviewer" of his works, arguing that Runciman had missed the concept of convexity, the theme of his book. "There are 607 references to convexity", Taleb wrote.

Published by Profile Books in 2018, How Democracy Ends looks at the political landscape of the West and whether democracy is at risk. Andrew Rawnsley in The Guardian wrote that the book left him "feeling more positive than I thought I would be"

=== Podcasting ===
From 2016 to 2022, Runciman hosted a podcast called Talking Politics with professor Helen Thompson. The podcast convened a panel of academics from the University of Cambridge and elsewhere to speak about current affairs and politics. It ended in March 2022 after over 300 episodes and 26 million downloads. Tim Abrams, writing in The Guardian, called it "terrific". Oliver Eagleton, writing in the New Statesman, said of it "There [Runciman] reflected on current affairs in his reassuring Eton baritone: parsing the headlines, never taking too strident a position, throwing softball questions to his guests ... and recycling conventional north London wisdom".

On 27 April 2023, Runciman launched "Past Present Future: The History of Ideas Podcast".

== Personal life ==
Runciman is the great-nephew of the historian Sir Steven Runciman. He inherited his family's viscountcy on the death of his father in 2020. From 1997 to 2021 he was married to the food writer Bee Wilson with whom he has three children. Since 2021 he has been married to psychotherapist Helen Lyon-Dalberg-Acton, daughter of academic Edward Acton.

== Arms ==
Coat of arms of David Runciman, 4th Viscount Runciman of Doxford
Crest A seahorse erect gules, holding in the fore fins a thistle as in the arms. Escutcheon Per fess or and azure a lymphad oars in action, the sail charged with a thistle leaved and slipped proper, flags flying to the dexter gules. Supporters On either side a seahorse or gorged with a chain pendent therefrom a grappling iron azure. Motto By sea

== Selected works ==
- Runciman, David (1997). Pluralism and the Personality of the State. Cambridge University Press. ISBN 9780521551915.
- Runciman, David (2000). "Is the State a Corporation?". Government and Opposition. 35 (1): 90–104. doi:10.1111/1477-7053.00014. S2CID 143599471.
- Maitland, Frederic William (2003). David Runciman; Magnus Ryan (eds.). Maitland: State, Trust and Corporation; Cambridge Texts in the History of Political Thought. Cambridge University Press. ISBN 9780521526302.
- Runciman, David (2009). The Politics of Good Intentions: History, Fear and Hypocrisy in the New World Order. Princeton University Press. ISBN 9781400827121.
- Runciman, David (2010). Political Hypocrisy: The Mask of Power, from Hobbes to Orwell and Beyond. Princeton University Press. ISBN 9780691148151.
- Brito Vieira, Monica; Runciman, David (2013). Representation. John Wiley & Sons. ISBN 9780745658292.
- Runciman, David (2014). Politics: Ideas in Profile. Profile Books. ISBN 9781782831358.
- Runciman, David (2015). The Confidence Trap: A History of Democracy in Crisis from World War I to the Present. Princeton University Press. ISBN 9781400866076.
- Runciman, David (2018). How Democracy Ends. Profile Books. ISBN 9781541616783.
- Runciman, David (2019). Where Power Stops. Profile Books. ISBN 9781788163330.
- Runciman, David (2020). "Don't be a Kerensky!". London Review of Books. Vol. 42, no. 23. pp. 13–16, 18.
- Runciman, David (2021). Confronting Leviathan : a history of ideas. London. ISBN 978-1-78816-782-6. OCLC 1228314920.
- Runciman, David (2023). The Handover: How We Gave Control of Our Lives to Corporations, States and AIs. Profile Books. ISBN 978-1788163675.

Peerage of the United Kingdom
Preceded by Garry Runciman	Viscount Runciman of Doxford; 2020–present	Incumbent
Baronetage of the United Kingdom
Preceded by Garry Runciman	Baronet of Doxford; 2020–present	Incumbent
