= Garry Runciman, 3rd Viscount Runciman of Doxford =

British historical sociologist (1934–2020)

The Right Honourable The Viscount Runciman of Doxford CBE FBA

Member of the House of Lords
- Lord Temporal
- In office 1 September 1989 – 11 November 1999 as a hereditary peer
- Preceded by: The 2nd Viscount Runciman of Doxford
- Succeeded by: Seat abolished (Note: Pursuant to the House of Lords Act 1999.)

Personal details
- Born: 10 November 1934
- Died: 10 December 2020 (aged 86)
- Party: Crossbench
- Spouse: Dame Ruth Runciman
- Children: 3
- Parents: Leslie Runciman, 2nd Viscount Runciman of Doxford; Katherine Schuyler Garrison
- Occupation: Historical sociologist

Academic background
- Education: Trinity College, Cambridge

Academic work
- Discipline: Historical sociology
- Institutions: Trinity College, Cambridge

Walter Garrison Runciman, 3rd Viscount Runciman of Doxford (10 November 1934 – 10 December 2020), usually known informally as Garry Runciman, was a British historical sociologist and hereditary peer. A senior research fellow at Trinity College, Cambridge, Runciman wrote several publications in his field. He also sat on the Securities and Investments Board and chaired the British Government's Royal Commission on Criminal Justice (1991–1993).

== Background ==
Runciman was the son of Leslie Runciman, 2nd Viscount Runciman of Doxford, by his second wife, Katherine Schuyler Garrison. The British historian Sir Steven Runciman was his uncle.

Runciman was educated at Eton College, where he was an Oppidan Scholar, and Trinity College, Cambridge. He inherited the viscountcy on the death of his father in 1989.

== Career ==
Runciman joined the faculty of Trinity College, Cambridge, in the 1950s as a historical sociologist and became a junior research fellow after submitting a thesis entitled Plato's Later Epistemology. In the 1960s he became primarily a sociologist. He became a senior research fellow in 1971, researching in the field of comparative and historical sociology. Runciman's principal research interest was the application of neo-Darwinian evolutionary theory to cultural and social selection.

In 1958, Runciman received a Commonwealth Fund Fellowship (Harkness Fellowship) to study philosophy and sociology at Harvard University, Columbia University, and University of California, Berkeley. He held honorary degrees from King's College London and the Universities of Edinburgh, Oxford, and York. He was also an Honorary Foreign Member of the American Academy of Arts and Sciences and an Honorary Bencher of Inner Temple. He was elected to the British Academy in 1975 and served as its president from 2001 to 2005. Runciman was also an honorary fellow of Nuffield College, Oxford.

== Official and parliamentary work ==
Runciman was invited by the Governor of the Bank of England to serve on the Securities and Investment Board (later to become the Financial Services Authority), from which he retired in 1998.

Runciman chaired the British Government's Royal Commission on Criminal Justice, established in 1991 and which continued Sir John May's inquiry into the convictions of the Maguire Seven and encompassed further miscarriages of justice. It reported to parliament in 1993. As a result, the Criminal Appeal Act 1995 established the Criminal Cases Review Commission as an executive Non-Departmental Public Body.

Runciman was a member of the House of Lords as a hereditary peer from the time he inherited the viscountcy on 1 September 1989. He spoke 26 times in the chamber until 11 November 1999 when he lost his right to sit there when the bulk of the hereditary peers were removed by the House of Lords Act 1999. Runciman sat for a subsequent by-election to the Lords in 2010 to fill the Crossbench hereditary seat vacancy following the death of Lord Colville of Culross; the House seat went to the Earl of Clancarty.

== Publications ==
Runciman's first major publication was Relative Deprivation and Social Justice: a Study of Attitudes to Social Inequality in Twentieth-Century Britain. Since then, he has published A Critique of Max Weber's Philosophy of Social Science, A Treatise on Social Theory, and The Social Animal. In 2004, he edited and contributed to a British Academy occasional paper Hutton and Butler: Lifting the Lid on the Workings of Power, which deals with the events surrounding Britain's participation in the invasion of Iraq and the way in which it was presented to the British public.

== Marriage and children ==
Runciman married Ruth Hellman on 17 April 1963. She was made a Dame Commander of the Most Excellent Order of the British Empire (DBE) in 1998. They had three children:

- Hon. Lisa Runciman (born 18 August 1965)
- David Walter Runciman, 4th Viscount Runciman of Doxford (born 1 March 1967)
- Hon. Catherine Runciman (born 18 July 1969)

Runciman died on 10 December 2020. His heir, the 4th Viscount, is a political scientist and writer who teaches at Cambridge University as a Professor of Politics.

== Arms ==
Coat of arms of Garry Runciman, 3rd Viscount Runciman of Doxford
Crest A seahorse erect gules, holding in the fore fins a thistle as in the arms. Escutcheon Per fess or and azure a lymphad oars in action, the sail charged with a thistle leaved and slipped proper, flags flying to the dexter gules. Supporters On either side a seahorse or gorged with a chain pendent therefrom a grappling iron azure. Motto By sea

== Notes ==
Peerage of the United Kingdom
Preceded by Leslie Runciman	Viscount Runciman of Doxford; 1989–2020; Member of the House of Lords (1989–1999)	Succeeded by David Runciman
