= Armstrong Whitworth Armadillo =

Armadillo

General information
- Type: Fighter
- National origin: British
- Manufacturer: Armstrong Whitworth Aircraft
- Designer: F. Murphy
- Status: Prototype
- Number built: 1

History
- First flight: 1918

The Armstrong Whitworth Armadillo was a British single-seat biplane fighter aircraft built by Armstrong Whitworth.

== Development and design ==
The Armadillo was designed in 1917 by Armstrong Whitworth's new chief designer, Fred Murphy, as a private venture single-seat fighter powered by a Bentley BR2 rotary engine. While the design met the requirements of Air Board Specification A1(a) for a replacement for the Sopwith Camel, it was principally produced to test the abilities of Armstrong Whitworth's new design team, and was not considered a serious competitor for the requirement. Despite this, Armstrong Whitworth was granted a licence in January 1918 to allow the construction of two prototypes.

The aircraft was a two-bay biplane with a square section fuselage. The engine in the nose was enclosed by a circular cowl with a deep hump above the cowl housing two .303 in (7.7 mm) Vickers machine guns that fired through the propeller arc using synchronisation gear.

The first prototype made its maiden flight in April 1918. The type was not subject to formal evaluation by the Air Ministry, with the poor view from the cockpit being criticised. By the time the Armadillo appeared the Sopwith Snipe, powered by the same engine and faster was already in large scale production and Murphy had started work on the more advanced Ara fighter, so the Armadillo was abandoned, the second prototype not being completed.

== Specifications ==
Data from War Planes of the First World War:Volume One: Fighters

General characteristics

- Crew: 1
- Length: 18 ft 10 in (5.74 m)
- Wingspan: 27 ft 9 in (8.46 m)
- Height: 7 ft 10 in (2.39 m)
- Wing area: 232 sq ft (21.6 m^{2})
- Empty weight: 1,250 lb (567 kg)
- Gross weight: 1,860 lb (844 kg)
- Fuel capacity: 40 imp gal (48 US gal; 180 L)
- Powerplant: 1 × Bentley BR2 nine-cylinder rotary engine, 230 hp (170 kW)

Performance

- Maximum speed: 125 mph (201 km/h, 109 kn) at ground level
- Endurance: 2 hr 45 min
- Service ceiling: 24,000 ft (7,300 m)
- Time to altitude: 6 min 30s to 10,000 ft (3,000 m)

Armament

- Guns: 2 × .303 in (7.7 mm) Vickers machine guns

== See also ==
Aircraft of comparable role, configuration, and era

- Boulton Paul Bobolink
- Nieuport B.N.1
- Sopwith Snipe
