= BAT Baboon =

F.K.24 Baboon
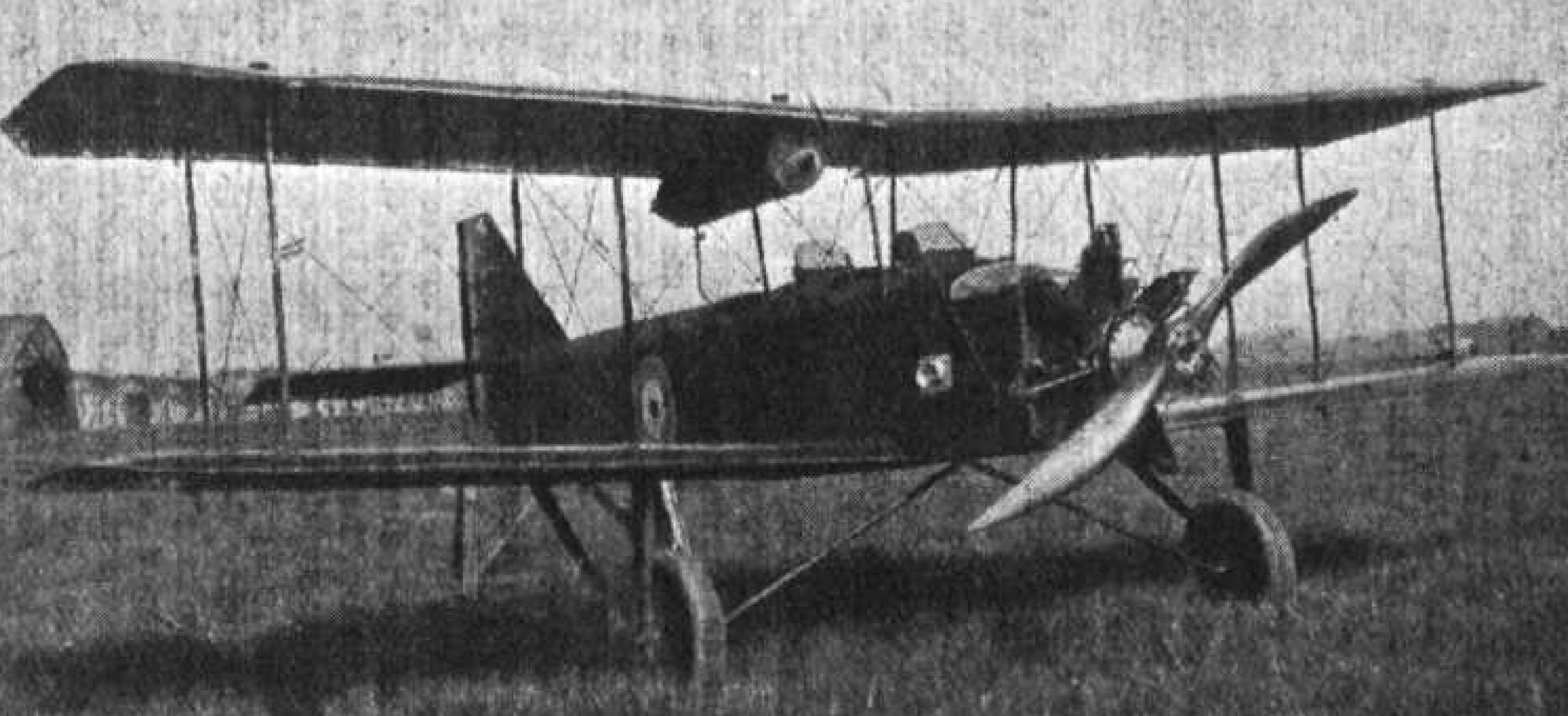

General information
- Type: Two-seat Trainer
- Manufacturer: British Aerial Transport Company Limited
- Designer: Frederick Koolhoven and Robert Noorduyn
- Number built: 1

History
- First flight: 1918

The BAT F.K.24 Baboon was a British two-seat training biplane produced by British Aerial Transport Company Limited of London during World War I.

== Design and development ==
Using experience gained designing the Bantam, aircraft designer Frederick Koolhoven (assisted by Robert Noorduyn) designed an elementary trainer, a two-bay biplane known as the F.K.24 Baboon.

The aircraft had a flat-sided fuselage and an uncowled 170 hp (127 kW) ABC Wasp engine. Six aircraft were planned but only one was built in July 1918.

The only notable act was when it won the Hendon Trophy Race over a 20-mile (32-km) circuit in July 1919 flown by Christopher Draper. The Baboon was scrapped in 1920.

== Specifications (F.K.24 Baboon) ==
Data from British Aeroplanes 1914-18

General characteristics

- Crew: 2
- Capacity: 400 lb (181.44 kg) disposable load
- Length: 22 ft 8 in (6.91 m)
- Wingspan: 25 ft (7.6 m)
- Height: 8 ft 10 in (2.69 m)
- Wing area: 259 sq ft (24.1 m^{2})
- Empty weight: 950 lb (431 kg)
- Gross weight: 1,350 lb (612 kg)
- Fuel capacity: 12 imp gal (54.55 L; 14.41 US gal)
- Powerplant: 1 × ABC Wasp I 7-cyl. air-cooled radial piston engine, 170 hp (130 kW)
- Propellers: 2-bladed BAT tractor, 5 ft (1.52 m), 7 ft 10 in (2.39 m) diameter

Performance

- Maximum speed: 90 mph (140 km/h, 78 kn)
- Landing speed: 40 mph (64 km/h; 35 kn)
- Endurance: 2 hours
- Rate of climb: 833.33 ft/min (4.2333 m/s)
- Time to altitude: 10,000 ft (3,048.0 m) in 12 minutes
- Wing loading: 5.2 lb/sq ft (25 kg/m^{2})
- Power/mass: 0.126 hp/lb (0.206 kW/kg)

== See also ==
Aircraft of comparable role, configuration, and era

- Airco DH.6
