= Sopwith Snapper =

British WW1 biplane fighter aircraft

Snapper

General information
- Type: Fighter
- National origin: United Kingdom
- Manufacturer: Sopwith
- Status: Prototype
- Number built: 3

History
- First flight: 1919

The Sopwith Snapper was a prototype British fighter aircraft of the First World War. A single-engined biplane designed by the Sopwith Aviation Company to replace the Sopwith Snipe fighter, it first flew after the end of the war, but did not enter service owing to the failure of its engine, only three aircraft being built.

== Development and design ==
In 1918, the British Air Ministry developed a requirement for a single-seat fighter to replace the Royal Air Force's Sopwith Snipes, even though the Snipe had yet to enter service. This requirement, RAF Type 1, specified the new ABC Dragonfly air-cooled radial engine, which had been ordered into production in large numbers on the basis of excellent promised performance and ease of production despite the fact that it had yet to complete testing.

To meet this requirement, Sopwith produced two new and completely different designs, a triplane (the Sopwith Snark) and a more conventional biplane, which was named the Snapper. The Air Ministry ordered three prototype Snappers, along with three Snarks. (In addition Sopwith received orders for 300 Dragonfly powered Snipes as the Sopwith Dragon).

The Snapper was a small single-bay biplane with heavily staggered wings. It was originally intended to have a wooden monocoque fuselage (as did the Sopwith Snail lightweight fighter and the Snark), but this was abandoned to ease production, with a more conventional wire-braced fabric covered fuselage substituted. The cockpit was positioned aft of the wings, providing good visibility to the pilot, while two forward firing synchronised Vickers machine guns were mounted on the fuselage top decking.

The change in fuselage design delayed production of the fuselage, with further delays being caused by the engine which was overweight, and suffered from catastrophic reliability and vibration problems. The first Snapper flew at Brooklands in May 1919, soon followed by the other two aircraft. Although performance was good when the Dragonfly was working correctly, the engines problems were unsolvable, with the engine eventually being cancelled in September 1919. Although Sopwith attempted to enter one of the Snappers (with the civil registration K149) into the 1919 Aerial Derby where it was to be flown by Harry Hawker, this was forbidden by the Air Ministry (officially as its engine was still classified as Secret) and the three Snappers were used for test flying by the Royal Aircraft Establishment.

== Specifications ==
Data from British Aeroplanes 1914-18

General characteristics

- Crew: 1
- Length: 20 ft 7 in (6.27 m)
- Wingspan: 28 ft 0 in (8.53 m)
- Height: 10 ft 0 in (3.05 m)
- Wing area: 292 sq ft (27.1 m^{2})
- Empty weight: 1,462 lb (663 kg)
- Gross weight: 2,190 lb (993 kg)
- Powerplant: 1 × ABC Dragonfly 9-cylinder air-cooled radial piston engine, 360 hp (270 kW)
- Propellers: 2-bladed fixed-pitch propeller

Performance

- Maximum speed: 140 mph (230 km/h, 120 kn) at 10,000 ft (3,000 m)
- Service ceiling: 23,000 ft (7,000 m)
- Time to altitude: 10,000 ft (3,000 m) in 7 minutes 50 seconds
- Wing loading: 7.5 lb/sq ft (37 kg/m^{2})
- Power/mass: 0.16 hp/lb (0.26 kW/kg)

Armament

- Guns: 2 × forward firing, synchronised .303 in Vickers machine guns

== See also ==
Aircraft of comparable role, configuration, and era

- Armstrong Whitworth Ara
- BAT Basilisk
- Nieuport Nighthawk
- Sopwith Dragon
- Sopwith Snark
- Westland Wagtail
