= Sopwith Snark =

British WW1 triplane fighter aircraft

Snark

General information
- Type: Fighter aircraft
- National origin: United Kingdom
- Manufacturer: Sopwith Aviation Company
- Number built: 3

History
- First flight: 1919

The Sopwith Snark was a British prototype fighter aircraft designed and built towards the end of the First World War to replace the RAF's Sopwith Snipes. A single engined triplane, the Snark did not fly until after the end of the war, only three being built.

== Development and design ==
In spring 1918, although the Sopwith Snipe had not yet entered service with the Royal Air Force, the British Air Ministry drew up a specification (RAF Type I) for its replacement. The specification asked for a fighter capable of operations at high altitude and powered by the ABC Dragonfly engine, which was an air-cooled radial engine which had been ordered in large numbers based on promises of high performance and ease of production.

Sopwith produced two designs to meet this requirement, a biplane, the Snapper, and a triplane, the Snark. Sopwith received orders for three prototypes each of the Snapper and Snark, as well as orders for 300 of a Dragonfly powered version of the Snipe, the Sopwith Dragon. The Snark had a wooden monocoque fuselage like that of the Sopwith Snail lightweight fighter, and had equal span single-bay wings with ailerons on each wing. The wings had unequal spacing and stagger, with the gap between the mid and upper wings less than that between the lower and mid wings to minimise the height of the aircraft.

The Snark was fitted with what was, for the time, a very heavy armament for a single-seat fighter. In addition to the normal two synchronised Vickers guns inside the fuselage, it had four Lewis guns mounted under the lower wings, firing outside the propeller disc. These guns were inaccessible to the pilot, and so could not be reloaded or unjammed in flight.^{[a]}

The first prototype was complete by October 1918, but flight-ready engines were not available until March 1919, and the Snark did not make its first flight until July 1919. While it demonstrated reasonable performance and good maneuverability, (although not as good as the earlier Sopwith Triplane), by this time, it had been realised that the Dragonfly engine had serious problems, being prone to overheating and severe vibration, and plans for production of the Snark had been abandoned. The three Snarks continued in use for trials purposes until 1921.

== Specifications ==
Data from War Planes of the First World War: Fighters Volume Three

General characteristics

- Crew: One
- Length: 20 ft 6 in (6.25 m)
- Wingspan: 26 ft 6 in (8.08 m)
- Height: 10 ft 10 in (3.30 m)
- Wing area: 322 sq ft (29.9 m^{2})
- Gross weight: 2,283 lb (1,036 kg)
- Powerplant: 1 × ABC Dragonfly IA 9-cylinder air-cooled radial engine, 360 hp (270 kW)

Performance

- Maximum speed: 130 mph (210 km/h, 110 kn) at 3,000 ft (910 m)

Armament

- Guns:
  - 2 × synchronised, forward firing .303 in (7.7 mm) Vickers guns
  - 4 × .303 in Lewis guns under wings

== See also ==
Aircraft of comparable role, configuration, and era

- Armstrong Whitworth Ara
- BAT Basilisk
- Nieuport Nighthawk
- Siddeley Siskin
- Sopwith Dragon
- Sopwith Snapper
