= BAT F.K.27 =

F.K.27
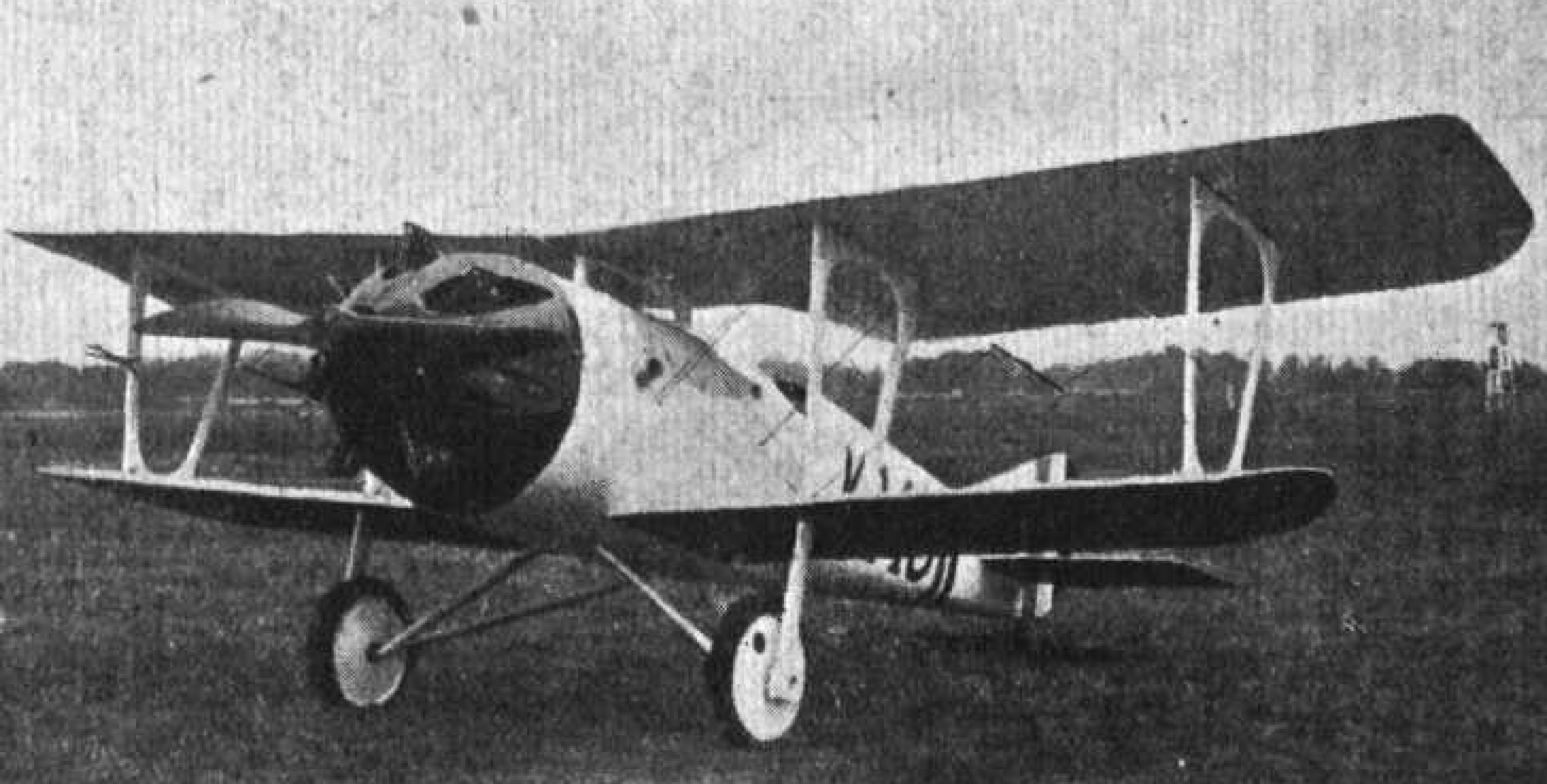

General information
- Type: Two-seater sport aircraft
- National origin: United Kingdom
- Manufacturer: BAT
- Designer: Frederick Koolhoven
- Number built: 1

History
- First flight: 1918

The BAT F.K.27 was a two-seater sporting biplane designed by Frederick Koolhoven and built by the British Aerial Transport Company Limited (BAT) in 1918.

== Design and development ==
The F.K.27 was a sesquiplane two-seater with side-by-side seating staggered en echelon to starboard. The two bay sesquiplane wings were arranged conventionally, with the lower mainplane attached to the bottom of the fuselage and the upper mainplane supported on cabane struts above the fuselage and solid built up inter-plane struts. The fixed under-carriage consisted of strut supported main-wheels and a sprung tailskid at the rear extremity of the fuselage. Powered by a 200 hp (149.14 kW) ABC Wasp II, the F.K.27 was also aerobatic.

== Specifications (F.K. 27) ==
Data from Jane's All the World's Aircraft 1919

General characteristics

- Crew: 2
- Capacity: 400 lb (180 kg) disposable load
- Length: 20 ft 7 in (6.27 m)
- Upper wingspan: 26 ft (7.9 m)
- Lower wingspan: 22 ft 10 in (6.96 m)
- Height: 7 ft 10 in (2.39 m)
- Wing area: 200 sq ft (19 m^{2})
- Empty weight: 800 lb (363 kg)
- Gross weight: 1,400 lb (635 kg)
- Fuel capacity: 30 imp gal (136.4 L; 36.0 US gal)
- Powerplant: 1 × ABC Wasp II 7-cylinder air-cooled radial piston engine, 200 hp (150 kW) at 1,850 rpm
- Propellers: 2-bladed BAT tractor 5 ft 4 in (1.63 m) pitch, 7 ft 10 in (2.39 m) diameter

Performance

- Maximum speed: 142 mph (229 km/h, 123 kn)
- Landing speed: 50 mph (43 kn; 80 km/h)
- Endurance: 4 hours at ¾ throttle
- Rate of climb: 2,500 ft/min (13 m/s)
- Time to altitude: 5,000 ft (1,500 m) in 2 minutes
- Wing loading: 7 lb/sq ft (34 kg/m^{2})
- Power/mass: 0.143 hp/lb
