= Armstrong Whitworth Ara =

1919 British biplane fighter aircraft

Ara

General information
- Type: Fighter
- National origin: United Kingdom
- Manufacturer: Armstrong-Whitworth
- Designer: Fred Murphy
- Status: Prototype
- Number built: 2

History
- First flight: 1919

The Armstrong Whitworth Ara was an unsuccessful British single-seat biplane fighter aircraft of the First World War built by Armstrong Whitworth.

== Design and development ==
In early 1918, the British Air Ministry wrote RAF Specification Type 1 for a single-seat fighter to replace the Sopwith Snipe. The specified engine was the ABC Dragonfly, a new radial engine which had been ordered into production based on promised performance before any testing had been carried out. To meet this specification, Armstrong Whitworth's chief designer, Fred Murphy, produced the Armstrong Whitworth Ara, three prototypes being ordered.

The Ara was a two-bay biplane. It had a square fuselage, the engine was covered in a pointed cowling, but with the cylinder heads exposed. The upper wing was low to give the pilot a better upwards view.

As with the other fighters built to meet the Type 1 specification, the Dragonfly engine proved to be the Ara's undoing, demonstrating hopeless reliability. Two of the three prototypes were completed, the first flying in mid-1919. The Ara was abandoned towards the end of the year when Armstrong Whitworth closed down its aircraft department.

== Specifications ==
Data from War Planes of the First World War:Volume One: Fighters

General characteristics

- Crew: 1
- Length: 20 ft 3 in (6.17 m)
- Wingspan: 27 ft 5 in (8.36 m)
- Height: 7 ft 10 in (2.39 m)
- Wing area: 257 sq ft (23.9 m^{2})
- Empty weight: 1,320 lb (599 kg)
- Gross weight: 1,930 lb (875 kg)
- Powerplant: 1 × ABC Dragonfly I nine-cylinder radial engine, 320 hp (240 kW)

Performance

- Maximum speed: 150 mph (240 km/h, 130 kn) at sea level
- Endurance: 3 hr 15 min
- Service ceiling: 28,000 ft (8,500 m)
- Time to altitude: 4 min 30 s to 10,000 ft (3,000 m)

Armament

- Guns: 2 × .303 in (7.7 mm) Vickers machine guns

== See also ==
Aircraft of comparable role, configuration, and era

- Sopwith Dragon
- BAT Basilisk
- Sopwith Snark
- Sopwith Snapper
