= Villela Alagoas =

Brazilian aircraft

General information
- Type: Experimental aircraft
- National origin: Brazil
- Manufacturer: Brazilian Army
- Designer: Marcos Villela
- Number built: 1

History
- First flight: 11 November 1918

The Villela Alagoas was a Brazilian single-engine, biplane, tandem-seat experimental aircraft.

== Design and development ==
It had a metal and wooden frame, wooden wings of painted outer cover.

== Specifications ==
Data from Pereira 1997, p. 283

General characteristics

- Crew: 2
- Length: 7.71 m (25 ft 4 in)
- Upper wingspan: 10 m (32 ft 10 in)
- Height: 2.81 m (9 ft 3 in)
- Powerplant: 1 × Luck , 60 kW (80 hp)
- Propellers: 2-bladed

Performance

- Service ceiling: 800 m (2,600 ft)
