= Christopher Draper =

British WWI flying ace (1892–1979)

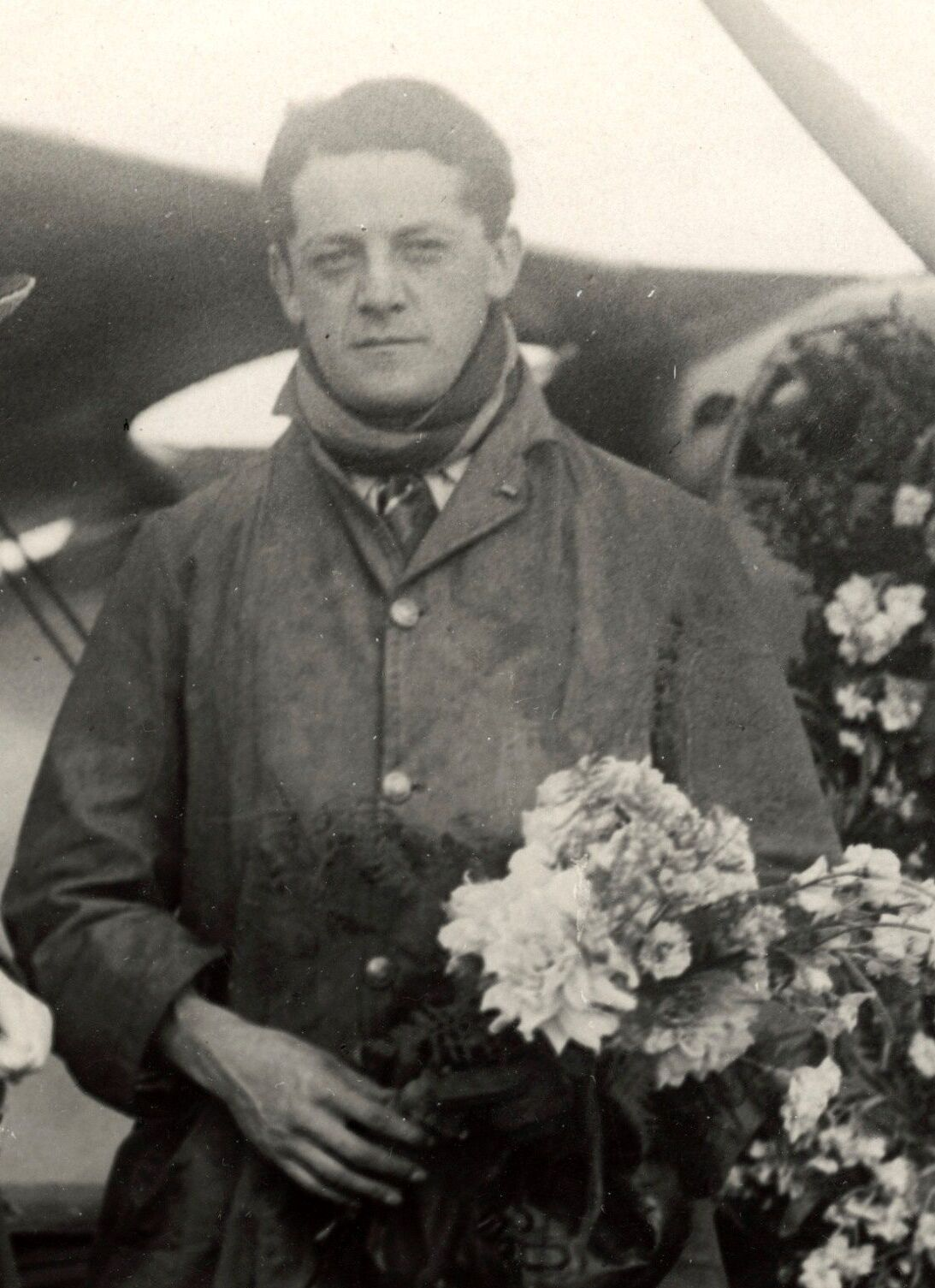
- Christopher Draper in 1919
- Born: 15 April 1892; Bebington, Cheshire, England, UK
- Died: 16 January 1979 (aged 86)
- Military career
- Allegiance: United Kingdom
- Branch: Royal Naval Air Service; Royal Air Force
- Service years: 1914–1918, 1939-1945
- Rank: Major
- Nickname: The Mad Major
- Units: 3 Naval Wing; 6 Naval Squadron
- Commands: 8 Naval Squadron (later redesignated No. 208 Squadron RAF)
- Awards: Distinguished Service Cross; Croix de Guerre (France)
- Other work: Actor, veterans' rights activist

Squadron Commander Christopher Draper DSC (15 April 1892 – 16 January 1979), was an English flying ace of World War I. His penchant for flying under bridges earned him the nickname "the Mad Major". After the war he became a film star through his work both as a stunt pilot and as an actor. During the 1930s he worked for a time as a British secret agent, serving as a double agent to Nazi Germany. He returned to the Navy in World War II. During his flying career he logged over 17,000 flying hours on 73 types of aircraft.

== Early life ==
Christopher Draper was born at Bebington on the Wirral in Cheshire, England, into a family of five sons and two daughters. He became interested in flying in July 1909 when Louis Blériot flew across the English Channel. Unable to afford the £75 fee for pilot training, Draper wrote to his local MP, Joseph Hoult, who was an acquaintance of his father. Hoult provided Draper with £210 after making him promise not to tell anyone about the gift. On 9 October 1913, with a total of 3 hours 15 minutes of flying experience, he obtained Royal Aero Club Aviator's Certificate No. 646 after flying a Grahame-White biplane at the Grahame-White Flying School at Hendon Aerodrome.

While trying to find a job flying, he learned from a cousin in the service that the Royal Navy was offering short service commissions to pilots with an Aviator's Certificate. After passing the medical Draper joined the Royal Naval Air Service on 27 January 1914 and was commissioned as a probationary sub-lieutenant, RNR.

From January to April 1914 he attended the fifth course at the Central Flying School. Also on the course were Hugh Dowding and Wilfrid Freeman while the instructors included John Tremayne Babington and John Salmond – all of whom were later air marshals. After passing his course, Draper was assigned to the Royal Naval Air Station at Eastchurch under the command of Commander Charles Rumney Samson. He was promoted to flight lieutenant in June, and on 20 July he was one of nine pilots who flew in the Naval Review at Spithead, the first review to include aircraft.

Spending the initial war years on Home Defence in Newcastle and Scotland, Draper initiated his liking for dare-devil exploits by flying a seaplane under one of the spans of the Firth of Tay bridge near Dundee. While based at Dundee, Draper was ordered to land an aeroplane on the green at St. Andrew's golf course. He stopped right in front of the clubhouse.

On 28 June 1915 he was promoted to flight commander.

== World War I ==
=== Royal Naval Air Service ===
In mid-1916 he was posted to 3 Naval Wing, who were preparing to go to France. While collecting his new Sopwith 1½ Strutter, Draper flew the aircraft under the foot-bridge which ran around the racing track behind the Sopwith hangars at Brooklands. While flying the Sopwith 1½ Strutter with 3 Naval Wing he scored his first four victories while carrying out some of the first strategic bombing missions against German industrial targets. In 1917 he flew with 6 Naval Squadron on Nieuports, claiming two victories.

On 6 June 1917 his aircraft was shot up whilst in action against Jasta 5, before Draper slightly wounded prominent German ace Lt. Werner Voss (with 34 victories at the time), and forced him to land his Albatros D.III. After a heated argument with his commanding officer, Draper was transferred back to England soon after.

In the autumn of 1917 he returned to combat with 8 Naval Squadron, with which he scored three more victories. In October 1917 Draper became commanding officer of 8 Naval Squadron. Like most RNAS and RFC squadrons by now, it was a multi-national unit, manned by British, Australians (including the leading Australian ace Robert A. Little), Canadians, and at least one American. By the time the war ended, this squadron would boast 25 aces.

On 31 December 1917 he was promoted to squadron commander. In March 1918 the squadron was posted to RAF Walmer and then on 30 March departed for France one day before the RNAS and RFC were amalgamated to form the RAF. Draper later commented "What a change, I don't think the Squadron was ever the same again".

During the Ludendorff Offensive of spring 1918 the German Army's initial breakthrough and rate of advance was such that Draper was forced to order the burning of 16 of Naval 8's aircraft to prevent them being captured on the ground.

=== Royal Air Force ===
On 1 April 1918, 8 Naval Squadron became No. 208 Squadron RAF when the RNAS and the Royal Flying Corps merged to become the Royal Air Force. Draper refused to wear the new blue RAF uniform, and continued to wear the old naval blacks.

On 13 October 1918, he was wounded by anti-aircraft fire.

One morning while flying towards the front lines Draper accidentally flew under a bridge while in full view of a large body of troops. The troops cheered so heartily that Draper repeated the stunt wherever possible. This earned him his nickname "The Mad Major". (In its early days the RAF used Army ranks.)

For his service in the war he was awarded the Distinguished Service Cross in April 1918 and the French Croix de Guerre in August 1919.

== Interwar years ==
=== Stunt and film flying ===
After the war Draper became a secondhand car salesman. When this venture failed he returned to flying, and in April 1919 he was the chief test pilot for the British Aerial Transport Company, piloting the first flight of their F.K.26. This was the first aircraft specifically designed to carry passengers.

Draper was lucky to survive a crash on 23 March 1920 test flying the BAT Bantam at Hendon. When the company folded Draper sought an interview with Air Marshal Hugh Trenchard and was granted a short service commission as a squadron leader on 27 September 1920. Posted to the Central Flying School he led the RAF aerobatic team in the 1921 Air Pageant in July, and then resigned on 6 October. After leaving the RAF, he continued to fly as a stunt pilot at air shows and in films.

In 1930, out of work and penniless, he decided to raise his public profile and protest over the government's treatment of war veterans by staging an aerial publicity stunt. Borrowing a Puss Moth, he set out to fly under all 14 of London's bridges over the River Thames. Due to bad weather on the day he only managed to fly under two. This was captured on film and brought "The Mad Major" the desired degree of fame.

Draper's work as a stunt pilot in films eventually led him into acting. Standing six feet two inches tall, with a robust frame and a classic profile, he was photogenic. He starred in many theatrical productions and several films as "George Mannering". He played a pilot in 1935's King of the Damned.

=== Espionage work ===
In 1932 Draper was invited to participate in an "Aces of the Air Tour" of Germany. Aces from many nations participated. In addition to meeting various German aces (he became firm friends with the German ace Major Eduard Ritter von Schleich). He was also introduced to Adolf Hitler.

As a result of this meeting and of Draper's longstanding criticism of the British government's treatment of veterans, he was listed by the Nazi Party as a potential sympathiser. After his return to England he was contacted and asked to spy for the Germans. He agreed and then immediately contacted MI6. They decided to use him as a double agent to feed false information to the Nazis. This situation continued for about four years until the Germans stopped answering Draper's communications.

== World War II and post-war years ==
In 1939, Draper joined the Royal Naval Reserve and was posted to Ford as assistant armament officer before going to Trinidad. In World War II, although 47 years of age, he became a lieutenant commander with postings in Scotland and the Gold Coast in 1943, before commanding No. 777 Squadron at Freetown, flying anti-submarine duties in Supermarine Walrus, Boulton Paul Defiant and Fairey Swordfish aircraft.

After the war Draper once more drifted into a variety of activities including acting and store-keeping. By the 1950s he was once again upset at the government's treatment of veterans. On 5 May 1953, he again repeated his earlier protest by flying under the Thames bridges. This time he flew a rented, 100 h.p. Auster monoplane under 15 of the 18 bridges. It was a spectacular stunt; the bridge arches were only 40 to 50 feet high; Draper was flying 90 mph and dodged around a ship. According to news accounts, he pulled off his stunt as a means of seeking attention and soliciting job offers. He was arrested, charged with flying too low in an urban area, and assessed a nominal ten guineas court costs.

"I did it for the publicity", Draper told the press; "For 14 months I have been out of a job, and I'm broke. I wanted to prove that I am still fit, useful and worth employing. ... They tell me I can be jailed, possibly for six months. ... It was my last-ever flight- I meant it as a spectacular swansong."

However, he retained his pilot's licence for another eleven years; it was revoked in 1964.

His memoir, The Mad Major, was published by Aero Publishers in 1962.

Draper died in Camden, London in 1979.

== Bibliography ==
- Draper, Christopher (1962). The Mad Major. Aero Publishers.
