= BAT Basilisk =

British prototype fighter biplane of WWI

F.K.25 Basilisk
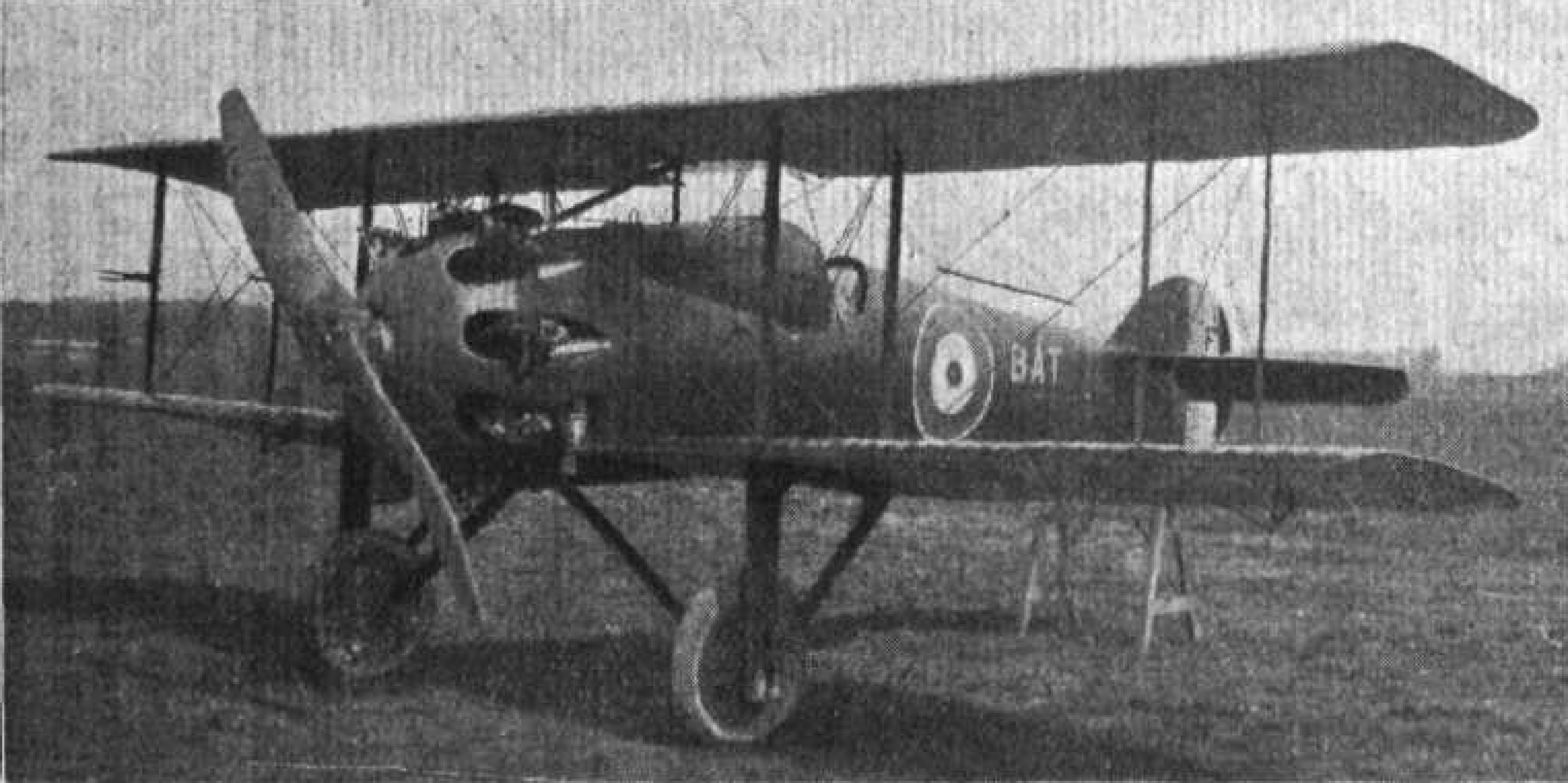

General information
- Type: Fighter aircraft
- National origin: United Kingdom
- Manufacturer: British Aerial Transport
- Designer: Frederick Koolhoven
- Status: Prototype
- Number built: 3

History
- First flight: September 1918

The BAT F.K.25 Basilisk was a prototype British fighter aircraft of the First World War. A single engined biplane intended to meet a requirement to replace the Sopwith Snipe, the Basilisk was unsuccessful, only three being built.

== Development and design ==
In 1918, the British Air Ministry issued the RAF Type 1 specification for a single-seat fighter, powered by the new (and untried) ABC Dragonfly air cooled radial engine to replace the Sopwith Snipe. To meet this requirement, Frederick Koolhoven, (formerly of Armstrong Whitworth Aircraft and before that Deperdussin) chief designer of the British Aerial Transport Company of London, designed the F.K. 25 Basilisk.

Like Koolhovens earlier F.K.23 Bantam, the Basilisk was a two-bay biplane with a wooden monocoque fuselage, but was larger and heavier to accommodate the larger engine and the equipment required by the Specification. Armament was two Vickers machine guns mounted ahead of the pilot, and enclosed in a large fairing that formed the upper coaming of the pilot's cockpit.

Three prototypes were ordered in early 1918, and the first one flew in September 1918. It was destroyed on 3 May 1919 when attempting to break the World altitude record, its engine catching fire and BAT's test pilot, Peter Legh, being killed after he jumped clear. The second and third prototype were fitted with modified, horn balanced ailerons, with the second prototype tested at Martlesham Heath in October 1919. While its performance was good (although not as good as claimed by BAT), the Dragonfly engine was hopelessly unreliable, with further development or production abandoned earlier in the year, and the Basilisk was abandoned when Koolhoven left BAT at the end of 1919.

== Specifications (Second prototype) ==
Data from Jane's All the World's Aircraft 1919 War Planes of the First World War: Fighters Volume One

General characteristics

- Crew: 1
- Capacity: 448 lb (203.21 kg) disposable load
- Length: 20 ft 5 in (6.22 m)
- Wingspan: 25 ft 4 in (7.72 m)
- Height: 8 ft 2 in (2.49 m)
- Wing area: 212 sq ft (19.7 m^{2})
- Empty weight: 1,350 lb (612 kg)
- Gross weight: 2,085 lb (946 kg)
- Fuel capacity: 40 imp gal (181.84 L; 48.04 US gal)
- Powerplant: 1 × ABC Dragonfly 9-cyl. air-cooled radial piston engine, 320 hp (240 kW)
- Propellers: 2-bladed BAT tractor 8 ft (2.44 m) pitch, 8 ft 8 in (2.64 m) diameter

Performance

- Maximum speed: 162 mph (261 km/h, 141 kn) at sea level

- 154 mph (248 km/h; 134 kn) at 10,000 ft (3,048.00 m)
- 141 mph (227 km/h; 123 kn) at 15,000 ft (4,572.00 m)
- 132 mph (212 km/h; 115 kn) at 20,000 ft (6,096.00 m)

- Landingspeed: 52 mph (84 km/h; 45 kn)
- Service ceiling: 22,500 ft (6,900 m)
- Rate of climb: 2,500 ft/min (13 m/s)
- Time to altitude: 5,000 ft (1,524.00 m) in 2 minutes

- 10,000 ft (3,048.00 m) in 5 minutes
- 20,000 ft (6,096.00 m) in 16 minutes 24 seconds

- Wing loading: 9.25 lb/sq ft (45.2 kg/m^{2})
- Power/mass: 0.173 hp/lb (0.285 kW/kg)

Armament

- Guns: 2× forward firing, synchronised 0.303 in (7.7 mm) Vickers machine guns

== See also ==
Related development

- BAT Bantam

Aircraft of comparable role, configuration, and era

- Armstrong Whitworth Ara
- Nieuport Nighthawk
- Siddeley Siskin
- Sopwith Snapper
- Sopwith Snark
