= Christopher Draper (disambiguation) =

Christopher Draper was an English flying ace.

Christopher Draper may also refer to:

- Christopher Draper (mayor), Lord Mayor of London
- Chris Draper, sailor
- Kris Draper, ice hockey player
