= ABC Dragonfly =

Dragonfly
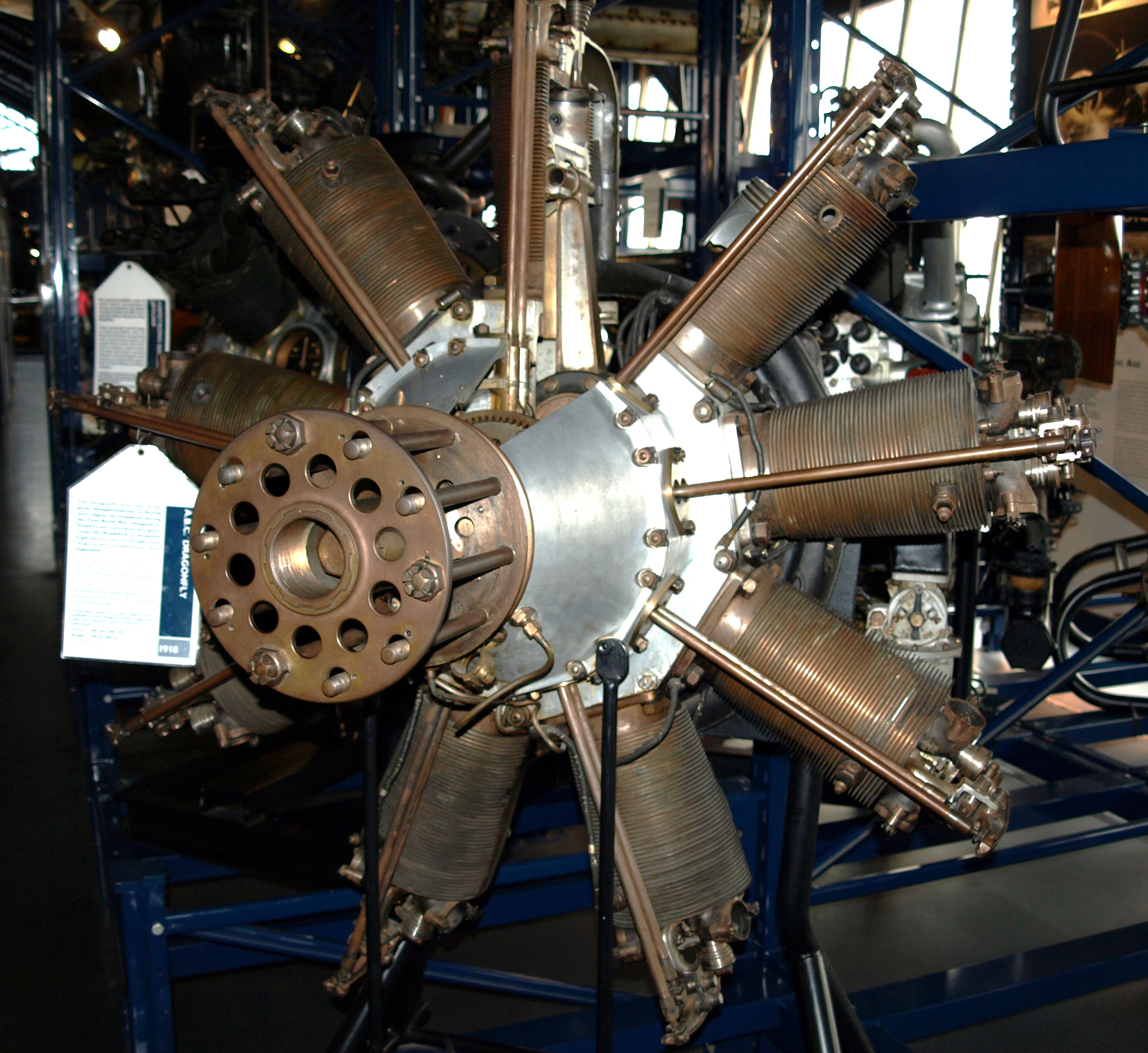
- ABC Dragonfly at the Science Museum (London)
- Type: Radial aero engine
- National origin: United Kingdom
- Manufacturer: ABC Motors
- Designer: Granville Bradshaw
- First run: 1918
- Number built: 1,147

The ABC Dragonfly was a British radial engine developed towards the end of the First World War. It was expected to deliver excellent performance for the time and was ordered in very large numbers. It proved, however, to be extremely unreliable and was abandoned when its faults were unable to be corrected.

== Design and development ==
ABC Motors was founded in 1911 by Granville Bradshaw, who was also the company's chief designer. In 1917, after initial promising tests of the ABC Wasp air-cooled radial, Bradshaw produced a design for a larger and more powerful engine, the nine-cylinder Dragonfly. The engine was simple and easy to produce, and was predicted to give 340 hp (254 kW) for a weight of 600 lb (273 kg). One distinctive feature was the use of copper-plated cooling fins, which were claimed by Bradshaw to be so effective that water would not boil on the surface of the radiators.

On the basis of the promised performance, Sir William Weir, the Director of Aeronautical Supplies, made the decision to place large orders for the Dragonfly. He briefed the British War Cabinet in March 1918 on what he considered to be the merits of the design (high power on low weight), and indicated it was the first engine on which 'it might be advisable to standardise', even though it had not been fully tested. With Weir's backing, orders for 11,500 engines were placed from 13 suppliers by June 1918, but in the same month the Royal Air Force (RAF)'s Technical Department admitted that complete drawings were unavailable as the design was still not finalised. It was planned that the bulk of the RAF's aircraft would be powered by the Dragonfly in 1919. Types designed to be powered by the big nine cylinder included the Sopwith Dragon (a derivative of the existing Snipe), the Nieuport Nighthawk, and the Siddeley Siskin. Of this order 1,147 engines were built, but only nine or ten actually flew.

The engine was described in brief by aviation journalist Bill Gunston in his book, 'Plane Speaking' in the chapter headed, 'Cancel the Others...' In this he suggested that Bradshaw had proved to be a better salesman than a designer, and had proved non-committal when asked about initial testing which was ultimately to reveal severe problems with the much-vaunted engine.

Already 30 kg over its designed weight as built, Dragonfly was subject to severe overheating. Gunston referred to it as the worst cooled aero engine ever made. The copper-plated cooling fins proved useless; the cylinder heads tended to glow a dull red at operational speeds, and in extreme cases caused heat damage and even charring to the propeller. Developed power fell far short of estimates even when the engine was run at 15 per cent over-speed (producing only 315 hp ) and it showed much poorer fuel consumption than expected. Attempts to improve cooling with cylinder redesign were marginally successful, but the death blow fell when it was realized that the engine was designed to run at the torsional resonance frequency of its own crankshaft, causing severe vibration, a little known condition at the time. These problems proved unsolvable, resulting in an absurdly low service life (around 30 to 35 hours per engine), and the Dragonfly was eventually abandoned.

Gunston's observations suggested that it had been as well that the Armistice had been signed in 1918, as the only other aero engine still in production at that time was the Rolls-Royce Eagle; all other types having been cancelled in favour of the untested Dragonfly.

== Variants ==
Dragonfly I
1918, 320 hp (239 kW)
Dragonfly IA
360 hp (268 kW), revised pistons and cylinder heads, revised oil system.

== Applications ==
- Armstrong Whitworth Ara
- Austin Greyhound
- Avro 533 Manchester
- BAT Basilisk
- Boulton Paul Bourges
- Bristol Badger
- de Havilland DH.11 Oxford
- Nieuport Nighthawk
- Nieuport London
- Siddeley Siskin
- Sopwith Bulldog
- Sopwith Cobham
- Sopwith Rainbow
- Sopwith Dragon
- Sopwith Snark
- Sopwith Snapper
- Westland Weasel

== Specifications (Dragonfly IA) ==
Data from Jane's Fighting Aircraft of World War I

=== General characteristics ===
- Type: nine-cylinder air-cooled radial engine
- Bore: 5½ in (139.7 mm)
- Stroke: 6½ in, (165.1 mm)
- Displacement: 1,389.86 in³ (22.78 L)
- Dry weight: 600 lb (273 kg)

=== Components ===
- Valvetrain: 3 overhead valves, 2 inlet and 1 outlet per cylinder
- Fuel system: Twin carburettors
- Oil system: 2 oil pumps
- Cooling system: Air-cooled

=== Performance ===
- Power output: 340 hp (254 kW) at 1,650 rpm
- Specific power: 0.24 hp/in³ (11 kW/L)
- Specific fuel consumption: 0.56 pints per bhp/hour(0.32 L/kW)
- Oil consumption: 7 pints per hour (3.97 L/hr)
- Power-to-weight ratio: 0.56 hp/lb (0.93 kW/kg)

== See also ==
- Lawrance J-1, contemporary American nine-cylinder radial (1921), direct ancestor of the Wright Whirlwind series of "golden age" American aviation radials.
