= 1918 in aviation =

This is a list of aviation-related events from 1918:

== Events ==
- The Imperial Japanese Navy establishes its first lighter-than-air aviation unit.
- The naval aviation branch of the Chilean Army's air corps receives its first aircraft.
- The Eberhart Steel Products Company is founded in Buffalo, New York. It specializes in manufacturing airplane parts and aeronautical equipment and will begin to produce airplanes in 1920.
- Kawasaki Heavy Industries Company Ltd. organizes an aircraft division.
- Spring 1918 – Three Imperial Japanese Navy Farman-type seaplanes fly nonstop from Yokosuka to Sakai, Japan, stretching the navy's aviation distance capabilities. The cities are 391 km (243 mi) apart.
- The French Army's Service Aeronautique employs four Breguet 14S air ambulances for casualty evacuation along the Aisne Front. Each aircraft can accommodate two stretcher cases.

=== January ===
- Gunner-observer Captain John H. Hedley is thrown from the cockpit of his Bristol F2B Fighter without a parachute during a dogfight when his pilot, Captain Reginald "Jimmy" Makepeace, puts the plane into a steep dive. After he falls several hundred feet, Hedley and the aircraft come back together and he manages to grab the fighter's after fuselage and crawl back into his cockpit unharmed.
- The British Army convenes an inquiry to look into the failure of the British offensive in the Battle of Cambrai in November–December 1917. The inquiry finds that the German use of massed aircraft for close air support of German ground troops subjected British ground troops to so much machine-gun fire that they felt helpless and became demoralized, allowing a successful German counterattack.
- January 3 – With its owner, Alfred Harmsworth, 1st Viscount Northcliffe, concerned about declining support for the war effort by the British public and believing that news about the successes of living British pilots by name would create popular heroes and improve public morale, the British newspaper the Daily Mail publishes an editorial strongly criticizing the British Army's policy of not disclosing the names of successful Royal Flying Corps pilots unless they are killed, a policy instituted because of a belief by the British Army's leadership that such publicity would harm the esprit de corps of their fellow aviators. Other British newspapers quickly take up the cause, prompting the British Army to begin identifying pilots by name. France and Germany had identified their pilots to the press since early in World War I.
- January 5 – A rapid series of explosions and quickly spreading fires at the Imperial German Navy airship base at Tondern destroys four hangars and five airships in five minutes, killing four civilian workers and 10 naval personnel and injuring 134 naval personnel.
- January 7 – After the British Army drops its policy of not disclosing the names of successful Royal Flying Corps pilots unless they are killed, the Daily Mail publishes "Our Wonderful Airmen – Their Names At Last," the first article in the British press identifying living RFC pilots by name. The article discusses the exploits of Captains Philip Fuller and James McCudden.
- January 9 – In a dogfight over Moorslede, Belgium, with three Royal Flying Corps aircraft including a No. 21 Squadron R.E.8 and two No. 60 Squadron S.E.5as, Max Ritter von Müller's Albatros D.Va is set on fire and he jumps to his death. Von Müller's 36 victories make him the highest-scoring Bavarian ace of World War I.
- January 12 – A decree issued by the Council of Peoples' Commissars of the Republic puts all Russian aircraft manufacturing companies under state control.
- January 28–29 (overnight) – The first German bombing raid against the United Kingdom of the new year is carried out by 13 Gotha Grossflugzeug and two Riesenflugzeuge bombers. Six Gothas turn back due to poor visibility, but the other bombers attack targets in England, resulting in the deaths of 67 people and injuries to 166, including 14 killed and 14 injured in stampedes when "maroons" warning rockets are fired to warn of an imminent attack. Another 11 are injured by shrapnel from British antiaircraft shells. Most of the casualties are from a single 300 kg (661 lb) bomb that hits Odhams Press in Long Acre, London, where people are sheltering. British aircraft fly over a hundred defensive sorties, and two Sopwith Camels of the Royal Flying Corps's No. 40 Squadron shoot down a Gotha, the first victory over a heavier-than-air bomber over the United Kingdom for British night fighters. Both pilots, Second Lieutenants Charles C. Banks and George Hackwill will receive the Distinguished Flying Cross.
- January 29–30 (overnight) – For the first time, German Riesenflugzeug bombers attack the United Kingdom without Gotha bombers accompanying them; the four bombers are from Riesenflugzeug Abteilung ("Giant Airplane Detachment") 501 (Rfa 501). One bomber turns back. The other three bomb England, inflicting only light damage and casualties. British aircraft fly 80 defensive sorties; five of them bring one of the German bombers under attack but succeed only in disabling one of its engines, and it returns safely to base. Unfamiliar with the great size of the bombers, many of the British pilots underestimate their size and fire at them from too great a range.
- January 30 – Second Lieutenant Carl Mather is killed in an aircraft collision at Ellington Field, Texas. The future Mather Air Force Base, later Sacramento Mather Airport, at Rancho Cordova, California, will be named for him.

=== February ===
- February 2 – The Imperial German Army's air service, the Luftstreitkräfte, forms its second and third Jagdgeschwader (fighter wings), bringing together four Jagdstaffeln (fighter squadrons) – Jagstaffeln ("Jastas") 12, 13, 15, and 19 – to form Jagdgeschwader II, with Adolf Ritter von Tutschek as its first commanding officer, and four other Jagdstaffeln – Jasta 2 "Boelcke" and Jastas 26, 27, and 36 – to form Jagdgeschwader III, with Bruno Loerzer as its first commanding officer.
- February 5 – Second Lieutenant Stephen W. Thompson achieves the first aerial victory by the U.S. military.
- February 8 – The United States replaces the national insignia for its military aircraft adopted in 1917 with a roundel with an outer red ring, then a blue ring, and a white center. The roundel will remain in use until the United States reverts to its former markings in August 1919.
- February 16–17 (overnight) – Four Riesenflugzeug bombers of the German Luftstreitkräfte's Riesenflugzeug Abteilung ("Giant Airplane Detachment") 501 (Rfa 501) raid England. One of them carries a single 1,000 kg (2,205 lb) bomb which aims at London Victoria station, but it lands .5 mi (0.8 km) away on the Royal Hospital, Chelsea.
- February 17–18 (overnight) – A single German Riesenflugzeug bomber attacks England, hitting St Pancras station in London, killing 21 people and injuring 32.
- February 18 – The Lafayette Escadrille, the American volunteer squadron serving in the French Army, is transferred to the United States Army and redesignated the 103rd Aero Squadron.
- February 20 – The German high command issues a memorandum governing the employment of German ground-attack squadrons in the upcoming spring offensive on the Western Front, Operation Michael. It lays out the role of the squadrons as "flying ahead of and carrying the infantry along with them, keeping down the fire of the enemy's infantry and barrage batteries," adding that the appearance of ground-attack aircraft over the battlefield "affords visible proof to heavily engaged troops that the Higher Command is in close touch with the front, and is employing every means to support the fighting troops." It also directs the squadrons to "dislocate traffic and inflict appreciable loss on reinforcements hastening up to the battlefield."

=== March ===
- March 6
  - The Finnish Air Force is founded.
  - The first successful flight of a powered unmanned heavier-than-air craft, the Curtiss-Sperry Flying Bomb, takes place. It is the precursor to modern unmanned aerial vehicles (UAVs).
- March 10 – German ace Hans-Joachim Buddecke is shot down and killed over Lens, France, in combat with Sopwith Camels of the Royal Naval Air Service's No. 3 Naval Squadron. He has 13 victories at the time of his death.
- March 11 – The first regular international airmail service begins, with Hansa-Brandenburg C.I aircraft linking Vienna, Lviv, Proskurov, and Kiev.
- March 7–8 (overnight) – Five German Riesenflugzeug giant bombers raid England. One of them drops a 1,000 kg (2,205 lb) bomb on Warrington Crescent near London's Paddington station; Lena Ford, who in 1914 had composed the popular wartime song Keep the Home Fires Burning and her 30-year-old son Walter are killed in their house by this bomb, becoming the first United States citizens to be killed in a German bombing raid.
- March 15
  - South African 10-kill ace Lieutenant H. B. Redler of the Royal Flying Corps's No. 24 Squadron shoots down and kills the commanding officer of Jagdgeschwader II, Adolf Ritter von Tutschek, who is flying a green Fokker Dr.I. Tutschek's 27 victories would amount to a quarter of his parent Jagdstaffel 12's 104 victories.
  - After an extensive conversion, HMS Furious re-enters service with the Royal Navy as the world's first aircraft carrier with aircraft lifts (elevators).
- March 18 – The first Norwegian airline, Det Norske Luftfartrederi, is founded.
- March 21 – Germany launches Operation Michael, marking the beginning of the Spring Offensive. In the initial attack against the British front west of St Quentin, the German Army Air Service has 1,680 aircraft to the Royal Flying Corps' 579. Thirty-eight German close air support squadrons take part in the offensive; massed at key points of the attack, the German ground-attack aircraft operate in great numbers, both attacking the enemy front line and disrupting the flow of enemy supplies, replacements, and reinforcements behind the line.
- March 24 – Captain John Lightfoot Trollope of the Royal Flying Corps' No. 43 Squadron shoots down six German aircraft in a day.
- March 25 – Ensign John McNamara makes the first United States Navy attack on a submarine.
- March 27
  - Under attack by several German Fokker Dr.I triplanes over Albert, France, 18-year-old Canadian Second Lieutenant Alan Arnett McLeod, the pilot of an Armstrong Whitworth F.K.8 of the Royal Flying Corps's No. 2 Squadron, and his observer, Lieutenant Arthur Hammond, shoot down four of the German fighters before themselves being shot down in flames and crash-landing in no man's land. The seriously injured McLeod carries the badly wounded Hammond to the British lines, and, although McLeod is wounded again in the process, both men survive. McLeod will receive the Victoria Cross for his actions in a ceremony on September 4 at the age of 19, the youngest airman to be awarded the Victoria Cross in World War I.
  - The Germans redesignate their Shutzstafffeln (escort squadrons) as Schlachtstaffeln (attack squadrons) in recognition of their close air support achievements during Operation Michael.
  - The first aircraft manufactured by the United States Navy′s Naval Aircraft Factory, a Curtiss H-16, makes its first flight, only 228 days after ground was broken for the construction of the factory at League Island Navy Yard in Philadelphia, Pennsylvania.
- March 30 – Alan Jerrard VC, a British ace with seven victories, is shot down by Benno Fiala von Fernbrugg and taken captive.
- Late March – The Balkenkreuz replaces the Cross Pattée insignia as the national marking on German military aircraft.

=== April ===
- April 1
  - The Royal Flying Corps and Royal Naval Air Service combine to form the Royal Air Force, the world's first independent air force, with Sir Hugh Trenchard as the first Chief of the Air Staff. The Women's Royal Air Force is formed at the same time.
  - A Vizefeldwebel Weimar becomes the first person to use a parachute in combat when he successfully bails out of a German Albatros D.Va fighter.
- April 4 – A two-seater aircraft takes off from a flying-off platform on a ship for the first time, when a Royal Air Force Sopwith 1½ Strutter launches from a platform mounted on a 12-inch (305-mm) gun turret of the Australian battlecruiser HMAS Australia. By November 1918, ships of the British Grand Fleet will carry over 100 aircraft on flying-off platforms, by which time 22 light cruisers will have a flying-off platform and every battleship and battlecruiser will carry a two-seat aircraft on a platform mounted on a forward turret and a single-seat fighter on a platform mounted on an after turret.
- April 7 – The German submarine UB-53 sees an airship accidentally catch fire and crash into the sea near the Strait of Otranto with the loss of all hands. It is the German Navy Zeppelin L 59 which had been modified for long-range flights, while on the outbound leg of a flight from Yambol, Bulgaria, in an attempt to bomb the Royal Navy base at Malta.
- April 8 – A flight of Airco DH.4s makes the first independent raid of World War I by aircraft of the United States Army's Aviation Section, U.S. Signal Corps, the forerunner of the United States Army Air Service.
- April 12
  - While attacking the German Navy Zeppelin L 62 while piloting an F.E.2b over England, Royal Air Force Lieutenant C. H. Noble-Campbell of No. 38 Squadron is wounded in the head by machine-gun fire from L 62 but returns safely to base. This is the only occasion on which an attacking airman is wounded in combat with an airship.
  - The final Zeppelin raid over England takes place.
  - Captain H. W. Woollett of the Royal Air Force's No. 43 Squadron scores six victories in two sorties, including five Albatros D.Vs.
- April 21 – German ace Manfred von Richthofen, the "Red Baron", is shot down and killed. By the time of his death, he had claimed 80 victories.
- April 23 – Lieutenant Paul Baer shoots down his fifth aircraft, becoming the first ace of the American Expeditionary Force.
- April 25 – Belgium's top-scoring ace, Willy Coppens, claims his first victory.
- April 27 – The United States Department of War creates a Division of Military Aeronautics responsible for the training of United States Army aviation personnel and units.
- April 29 – Flying a Nieuport 28 fighter, the top-scoring American ace of World War I, Eddie Rickenbacker, scores his first victory, shooting down a German Pfalz D.III fighter near Baussant, France.

=== May ===
- May 9
  - French ace René Fonck shoots down six German aircraft in a day.
  - United States Army Major Harold M. Clark, Jr., and Sergeant Robert P. Gay make the first interisland flight in Hawaii, flying from Fort Kamehameha on Oahu to Maui. They continue on to the island of Hawaii the same day, where they crash on the slopes of Mauna Kea in dense fog. Uninjured, they walk away from the crash and reach safety on foot two days later.
- May 9–10 (overnight) – The German Riesenflugzeug Abteilung ("Giant Airplane Detachment) 501 (Rfa 501) attempts the first heavier-than-air raid on England since March, sending four Riesenfluzeuge bombers to bomb Dover. They encounter high winds over the North Sea and are recalled; when they return home, they find their bases shrouded in fog. One lands safely, but the other three are destroyed in crashes, with only one entire crew surviving and only crew member surviving from each of the other two bombers.
- May 10 – The German Navy Zeppelin L 62 explodes, breaks in half, and crashes in flames over the North Sea with the loss of all hands under mysterious circumstances. The German Naval Airship Service blames her loss on an accident, while the Royal Air Force claims that one of its Felixstowe F.2a flying boats shot her down.
- May 13 – The United States issues its first air mail stamps to the public. They bear a picture depicting a Curtiss JN-4H "Jenny". One sheet comprises the "Inverted Jenny" error.
- May 15
  - Postmaster General of the United States Albert S. Burleson assigns Second Assistant Postmaster General Otto Praeger additional duty as the first chief of the U.S. Airmail Service, telling Praeger, "The airmail once started must not stop, but must be constantly improved and expanded until it would become, like the steamship and the railroad, a permanent transportation feature of the postal service."
  - The first regular United States air mail service commences, between Washington, D.C., Philadelphia and New York City. The first flight is made by Lieutenant Geoffrey Boyle in a modified Curtiss JN-4H "Jenny".
- May 16 – The Imperial German Navy recommissions the light cruiser Stuttgart after her conversion into a seaplane carrier. She is the only German seagoing aviation ship capable of working with the fleet commissioned during either World War I or World War II.
- May 19 – Raoul Lufbery, commander of the 94th (Hat in the Ring) Aero Squadron takes off in a Nieuport 28 to attack a German Albatros C.III near his airfield. After the German gunner hits his aircraft over Maron, France, he falls to his death from an altitude of between 200 and 600 feet (61 and 183 m). A story that he jumped from the plane to avoid burning to death in the air will be contradicted by 1962 research which concludes that he was thrown from his plane, which was not burning, when it flipped over after he unfastened his seat belt to clear a jammed machine gun. World War I will end with him as the second-highest-scoring American ace with 17 victories.
- May 19–20 (overnight) – Germany launches the largest heavier-than-air raid against the United Kingdom of World War I, with 38 Gotha and three Riesenfkugzeug bombers participating. Bombs fall on London for the last time in World War I during the raid. The bombers drop 1,236 kg (2,725 lb) of bombs according to British estimates or 1,500 kg (3,307 lb) according to the Germans, killing 49 people, injuring 177, and inflicting £117,317 in damage. British fighters and antiaircraft guns shoot down six Gothas, and after a protracted engagement a Bristol F.2B Fighter of the Royal Air Force's No. 141 Squadron forces a seventh Gotha to land substantially intact in England; the Bristol Fighter's two-man crew, Lieutenants Edward Eric Turner and Henry Balfour Barwise, each will receive the Distinguished Flying Cross for their achievement. The Germans launch no further heavier-than-air bomber attacks against the United Kingdom during World War I; in the 27 heavier-than-air raids, German bombers have dropped 111,935 kg (246,774 lb) of bombs, killing 835 people, injuring 1,972, and inflicting £1,418,272 of damage in exchange for the loss of 62 bombers either shot down over England or destroyed in crashes while attempting to return to base.
- May 21 - President Woodrow Wilson creates a Bureau of Aircraft Production responsible for aeronautical equipment.
- May 23 – The United States Government approves the temporary assignment of United States Army Air Service cadets undergoing training by the Royal Italian Army's Military Aviation Corps to complete their tactical training with assignments to Italian bomber squadrons during combat operations, but reserves the right to transfer them to U.S. Army Air Service units at any time.
- May 24
  - József Kiss, Austria-Hungary's fifth-highest-scoring ace, is shot down in combat. He had scored 19 victories.
  - In Russia, Order No. 385 of the Bolshevik People's Commissariat on Military and Naval Affairs creates the Main Directorate of the Workers' and Peasants' Red Air Fleet, the predecessor of the Soviet Air Forces.
  - The United States Department of War recognizes the Bureau of Aircraft Production and the Division of Military Aeronautics as constituting the United States Army Air Service.
- May 31 - Douglas Campbell scores his fifth victory, becoming the first American pilot to become an ace while flying for an American-trained unit.

=== June ===
- From the basis of VIII Brigade, the Royal Air Force forms the Independent Force, tasked to mount a strategic bombing campaign against Germany "independently" of the ground and sea campaigns the Allies have been waging since 1914.
- The United States Marine Corps consolidates its aviation forces at the Marine Flying Field at Miami, to form the First Marine Aviation Force. Composed of four squadrons, the force will deploy to France for combat.
- On the Western Front in France, Australian Army Lieutenant General John Monash tasks Captain Lawrence Wackett of No. 3 Squadron, Australian Flying Corps, with inventing a system for air-dropping ammunition to soldiers at the front who are cut off from supply. Adapting bomb racks on Royal Aircraft Factory R.E.8 aircraft, Wackett in nine days develops a system capable of dropping two boxes per aircraft with a total of 2,304 rounds of .303 ammunition. Over the course of ten days, No. 3 Squadron adapts bomb racks and makes more than 100 parachutes for the system in one of its hangars.
- Early June – The Royal Navy destroyer HMS Vectis conducts towing trials with the NS-class blimp N.S.3 to see if an airship which runs out of fuel or suffers a mechanical breakdown can be towed at speed by a ship at sea. Vectis reaches nearly 20 knots with N.S.3 in tow during successful initial trials, but N.S.3 touches down on the sea on the final run.
- June 1
  - The Australian ace Lieutenant Colonel Roderic Dallas, flying an SE.5a, is shot down and killed over Liévin, France, by the German ace Leutnant Johannes Werner in a Fokker Dr.I as Werner's sixth victory. Dallas's victory total of 51 will make him the highest-scoring Australian ace of World War I.
  - During the evening, the first of only two giant German Zeppelin-Staaken R.VI bombers lost to enemy action in World War I is shot down by anti-aircraft guns over the French lines. It becomes the first R.VI to be examined by the Allies.
- June 4 – The first flight of the first all-metal stressed-skin fighter, the Dornier-Zeppelin D.I, takes place.
- June 5 – Douglas Campbell, the first American to become an ace while flying for an American-trained unit, scores his sixth and final victory. Badly wounded during the flight, he sees no further combat.
- June 12 – Flying a Royal Aircraft Factory SE.5, Captain Roy Phillipps of Australian Flying Corps No. 2 Squadron raises his victory total to 11 by shooting down four German fighters – two Fokker Dr.I triplanes, an LVG, and a Fokker D.VII – in a single patrol over Ribécourt-la-Tour, France. The Fokker D.VII is the aircraft of Jagdstaffel 26 commanding officer Fritz Loerzer, an 11-victory ace, who is captured. Phillipps will receive the Distinguished Flying Cross for the patrol.
- June 19 – Italy's highest-scoring ace, Maggiore (Major) Francesco Baracca, is killed by Austro-Hungarian ground fire. He had claimed 34 victories.
- June 20 – Led by Captain Fiorello LaGuardia, 18 United States Army Air Service cadets undergoing training by the Royal Italian Army's Military Aviation Corps become the first American aviators to arrive on the Italian Front for bombing operations against Austria-Hungary. Assigned to various squadrons of the Italian Royal Army Military Aviation Corps' 4th and 14th Bombardment Groups, the take part in an Italian bombing raid against the Austro-Hungarian railway center at Falze de Piave the same day. Shot down and taken prisoner by Austria-Hungary, Lieutenant Clarence Young becomes the first of three American aircrew casualties suffered while flying with the Italians during World War I.
- June 24
  - The first scheduled Canadian airmail flight is made, between Montreal and Toronto.
  - The Royal Air Force employs its new 1,650 lb (748 kg) bomb in combat for the first time when a Handley Page O/400 of No. 216 Squadron drops one on Middelkerke, Belgium.
- June 26 – Attached to the Royal Air Force's No. 65 Squadron, United States Army Air Service ace First Lieutenant Field Eugene Kindley scores the first of his 12 victories, shooting down the Pfalz D.III of Jagdstaffel 5 commanding officer Leutnant Wilhelm Lehmann over Albert, France.

=== July ===
- During the month, the American writer William Faulkner arrives in Canada for flight training with the Royal Air Force. He still is in training there when the World War I ends, after which he returns to the United States.
- July 4 – During the Battle of Hamel, fought in and around Le Hamel, France, thirteen Royal Aircraft Factory F.E.8 aircraft of No. 9 Squadron, Royal Air Force, use a system invented in June 1918 by Australian Flying Corps Captain Lawrence Wackett to air-drop boxes of .303 ammunition by parachute to troops cut off from supply. The aircraft fly 51 sorties and drop 90,000 rounds of ammunition. The squadron loses two aircraft, one shot down by German aircraft and one which crashes — killing its two-man crew — after a parachute used in the ammunition-dropping system snags on and damages one of its wings. Although some ammunition boxes fail to deploy or drift into trees or German positions, the air-dropped ammunition successfully supplements ammunition resupply that arrives by conventional means. It is the first time that aircraft are used to resupply ground troops via air-drops on a significant scale.
- July 6 – Five Imperial German Navy Marinefliegerkommando (Naval Aviation Command) seaplanes returning from a raid on Lowestoft — one of them flown by the ace Friedrich Christiansen — surprise the British Royal Navy HMS C25 while she is on the surface in the Thames Estuary 15 nautical miles (17 mi; 28 km) east of Orford Ness. They attack her with machine guns, killing her commanding officer and four other members of her crew and damaging her so badly that she has to be towed back to port.
- July 9 – British ace James McCudden is killed when his aircraft crashes on take-off at Auxi-le-Château, France. He has 57 victories at the time of his death, enough to make him the seventh-highest-scoring ace of World War I.
- July 14 – Flying a Nieuport 28, the youngest son of former U.S. President Theodore Roosevelt, Second Lieutenant Quentin Roosevelt – serving as a fighter pilot in the United States Army Air Service's 95th Aero Squadron – is shot down and killed by a German fighter over Chamery, France.
- July 19 – Seven Royal Air Force Sopwith 2F.1 Camel fighters from the Royal Navy aircraft carrier HMS Furious attack the Imperial German Navy airship base at Tondern, destroying the Zeppelins L 54 and L 60. It is history's first air attack by conventional land planes launching from an aircraft carrier's flight deck and the most successful attack by shipboard aircraft of World War I. All seven Camels are lost: one crashes into the sea in bad weather, killing its pilot; two ditch in the sea, and their pilots are rescued by the British naval force escorting Furious; and four land in neutral Denmark, where they and their pilots are interned. One of the pilots recovered from the sea – Captain William F. Dickson, rescued by the destroyer HMS Violent – is a future Marshal of the Royal Air Force, Chief of the Air Staff, and Chief of the Defence Staff.
- July 21 – Two United States Navy seaplanes from Naval Air Station Chatham, Chatham, Massachusetts, attack a surfaced German submarine that is firing at a tug and three barges off Cape Cod, Massachusetts. One bomb strikes the submarine, but is a dud.
- July 26 – Major Edward "Mick" Mannock, the United Kingdom's highest-scoring ace of the war, is shot down by German ground fire and killed. He traditionally is credited with 73 victories as the highest-scoring British ace of World War I, but he never claimed that many and his actual score may have been 61.
- July 30
  - Lieutenant Frank Linke-Crawford, the fourth-highest-scoring Austro-Hungarian ace, is shot down and killed in aerial combat. He had scored 27 victories.
  - The United States Marine Corps's 1st Marine Aviation Force, minus one of its four squadrons, arrives at Brest, France, to become the first U.S. Marine Corps aviation force to serve in combat. Delays in transportation and the arrival of equipment will prevent it from operating until mid-October.
- July 31
  - An aircraft takes off from a platform installed on a towed lighter for the first time, when Royal Air Force Lieutenant Stewart Culley takes off in a Sopwith Camel from a lighter towed behind a British warship.
  - A Royal Air Force bombing raid over Germany by 12 Airco DH.9s suffers the loss of 10 aircraft shot down.

=== August ===
- A large petroleum barge on the Volga River in Russia is equipped with a flight deck and elevators (lifts) to carry up to nine Grigorovich M.9 flying boats and three Nieuport fighters. Named Kommuna and towed by a sidewheel paddle tug, she and her aircraft actively support operations of the Bolshevik Volga River Flotilla during the Russian Civil War.
- August 1
  - In the North Russia Campaign during the Russian Civil War, probably the first fully combined air, sea, and land military operation in history takes place, as Fairey Campania seaplanes from the Royal Navy seaplane carrier HMS Nairana join Allied ground forces and ships in driving Bolsheviks out of their fortifications on Modyugski Island at the mouth of the Northern Dvina in Russia, then scout ahead of the Allied force as it proceeds up the channel to Arkhangelsk. The appearance of one of the Campanias over Arkhangelsk induces the Bolshevik leaders there to panic and flee.
  - French ace Lieutenant Gabriel Guérin is killed in action. His 23 victories will tie him with Lieutenant René Dorme for ninth-highest-scoring French ace of World War I.
- August 5–6 (overnight) – Five Imperial German Navy Zeppelins attempt to bomb the United Kingdom in the fourth and final such raid of 1918. All of their bombs fall through clouds into the North Sea, and the commander of the Naval Airship Division, Fregattenkapitän Peter Strasser, is killed in action when a Royal Air Force Airco DH.4 piloted by Major Egbert Cadbury and crewed by Captain Robert Leckie shoots down in flames the Zeppelin in which he is flying as an observer, L70, over the coast of England. After Strasser's death, Germany attempts no more airship raids against the United Kingdom. During their 1915-1918 bombing campaign, German airships have made 208 raids against England, dropped 5,907 bombs, killed 528 people, and injured 1,156.
- August 9 – Eight Italian Ansaldo SVA biplanes of the 87 Squadriglia "Serenimissa", led by Gabriele d'Annunzio, fly over Vienna for 30 minutes without interference from Austro-Hungarian forces, taking photographs and dropping leaflets before returning to base without loss.
- August 10
  - During a dogfight, the Fokker D.VII fighter of the German fighter ace Oberleutnant Erich Löwenhardt collides with another D.VII flown by Leutnant Alfred Wenz near Chaulnes, France. Both men bail out; Wenz survives, but Löwenhardt's parachute fails and he falls to his death from 12,000 feet (3,700 meters). Löwenhardt's score of 53 kills will make him the third-highest-scoring German ace of World War I.
  - After shooting down two enemy aircraft earlier in the day, the German ace Rudolf Berthold collides with an enemy plane during a dogfight with Sopwith Camels. His Fokker D.VII crashes into a house, injuring him; although he survives, he never flies another combat mission. His total of 44 kills will make him the sixth-highest-scoring German ace of World War I.
- August 11
  - After taking off in a Sopwith Camel from a barge towed behind the destroyer HMS Redoubt, Royal Air Force Flight Sub-Lieutenant Stuart Culley shoots down the Imperial German Navy Zeppelin L 53, which had been flying a scouting mission over the North Sea. It is the first successful interception of an enemy aircraft by a shipborne fighter. German airships never conduct another scouting mission. L 53's sole survivor is a crewman who parachutes from the Zeppelin at an altitude of 19,000 feet (5,800 m), almost certainly a record at the time. L 53 is the last German airship destroyed during World War I.
  - The first use of a parachute from an airplane in combat occurs when a German pilot escapes his burning Pfalz D.III after being attacked by a pilot from the Royal Air Force's No. 19 Squadron.
- August 13 – North of Roye, France, United States Army Air Service First Lieutenant Field Eugene Kindley shoots down the Fokker D.VII of Lothar von Richthofen, the brother the late Manfred von Richthofen. Lothar von Richthofen, an ace with 40 confirmed air-to-air victories, suffers serious wounds and never flies in combat again. It is the fourth of Kindley's 12 kills.
- August 14
  - The French ace René Fonck shoots down three German aircraft in ten seconds in a head-on attack. All three crash within 100 meters (330 feet) of one another near Roye, France.
  - The only casualty from the use of a kite balloon by the United States occurs during an unsuccessful attempt to lower a balloon onto the deck of a destroyer escorting an eastbound convoy through the Irish Sea on a stormy evening. The kite balloon alternately plunges to port and starboard as the tether is shortened, dipping the balloon's basket into the water on each dive, and the man in the basket is lost before the balloon can be fully lowered.
- August 19 – A U.S. Navy Curtiss 18-T-1 triplane sets a new world speed record of 163 mph (262 km/h).
- August 21 – A flight of five United States Navy Macchi M.5 flying-boat fighters based at Porto Corsini, Italy, escorting a lone bomber across the Adriatic Sea to attack the Austro-Hungarian Navy base at Pola, Austria-Hungary, encounters four Austro-Hungarian Phönix D.I fighters. In the ensuing dogfight, the M.5s become separated, and Ensign George Ludlow is forced to land his damaged fighter on the sea 9 km (5.6 mi) from Pola. Charles Hammann lands his own M.5 and rescues Ludlow, who straddles the fuselage of Hammann's plane for the 111 km (69 mi; 60 nmi) flight back to Porto Corsini. Hammann will die in a crash in June 1919, but will receive the Medal of Honor posthumously in 1920, retroactively becoming the first U.S. aviator ever to receive the award.
- August 22 – Lieutenant Frigyes Hefty of the Austro-Hungarian Air Corps successfully parachutes from his burning fighter after a dogfight with Italian aircraft. He is the first person to survive a combat parachute jump.
- August 24 – American ace Louis Bennett Jr., flying an SE.5a with the Royal Air Force's No. 40 Squadron, is shot down by German antiaircraft fire while attacking a German observation balloon. He dies in a German field hospital in Wavrin, France, shortly after he is pulled from the wreckage. Including two balloons downed on his final flight, he has scored 11½ kills in a career spanning only 25 sorties. Nine of his victories have been balloons, and at the end of the war he will stand as the second-most-successful U.S. balloon buster, behind only Frank Luke′s score of 14 balloons.
- August 25 – Flying a Sopwith Dolphin, Jerry Pentland of the Royal Air Force's No. 87 Squadron downs two German aircraft – a DFW two-seater and a Fokker D.VII fighter – before being shot down himself and wounded in the foot. They are his last victories, but he emerges from World War I as Australia′s fifth-highest-scoring ace with 23 kills.
- August 27 – The first Director of the U.S. Army Air Service is appointed.

=== September ===
- Known to the Allies as "Black September:" During the month the Allies lose 560 aircraft on the Western Front, of which 87 are American.
- The Royal Air Force begins to issue parachutes to its squadrons for the first time.
- September 2 – The Imperial German Navy's air service brings together five of its Marine Feld Jagstaffeln ("Navy Field Fighter Squadrons") – Jagdstaffeln I, II, III, IV, and V – to form its first Jagdgeschwader (fighter wing), the Royal Prussian Marine Jagdgeschwader ("Navy Fighter Wing"), with Gotthard Sachsenberg as its first commanding officer. It is Germany's fourth Jagdgeschwader.
- September 7 – The U.S. Marine Corps's 1st Marine Aviation Force, building up in the Calais-Dunkirk area of France to operate as an element of the U.S. Navy's Northern Bombing Group, takes delivery of its first bomber.
- September 12 – 627 French and 611 American fighters are brought together for the Battle of Saint-Mihiel. At the time, it is the largest force of aircraft assembled for a single operation.
- September 14 – The British aircraft carrier Argus is completed. She is the world's first aircraft carrier with an unobstructed flight deck from stem to stern.
- September 15–16 (overnight) – Flying a Sopwith Camel, Frank Broome of the Royal Air Force's No. 151 Squadron shoots down a giant German Zeppelin-Staaken R.VI bomber over Beugny, France, one of the only two R.VI bombers lost to enemy action in World War I and the only one shot down by an Allied aircraft. He will be awarded the Distinguished Flying Cross for the achievement.
- September 18
  - The German ace Georg von Hantelmann shoots down and kills the French ace Lieutenant Maurice Boyau while Boyau is attacking German observation balloons. Boyau's 35 kills will make him the fifth-highest-scoring French ace of World War I.
  - When United States Army Air Service pilot Frank Luke attacks German observation balloons near Serrouville, France, while his wingman Joseph "Fritz" Wehner flies top cover for him, a dogfight with German Fokker D.VIIs develops in which Hantelmann shoots down and kills Wehner. Luke shoots down two of the D.VIIs as well as two balloons and a Halberstadt C.V, giving him five kills on one mission and 13 overall. Wehner dies after scoring six victories — five balloons and one Fokker D.VII — in only three days of aerial combat.
  - A U.S. Navy Curtiss 18-T-1 triplane piloted by Roland Rholfs sets a world altitude record of 34,910 feet (10,640 m).
- September 24
  - Royal Air Force Lieutenant Colonel Richard Bell Davies makes the first true aircraft carrier landing in history, landing a Sopwith 1½ Strutter on the bare steel flight deck of HMS Argus in the Firth of Forth.
  - Lieutenant David Ingalls claims his fifth victory, to become the first U.S. Navy ace in history and the only one of World War I.
- September 26 – For the second time French ace René Fonck shoots down six German aircraft in one day.
- September 27 – During a dogfight with SE.5as of No. 32 Squadron, Royal Air Force, the Fokker D.VII fighter of the German ace Leutnant Fritz Rumey either collides with the SE.5a of Captain George Lawson or is shot down by Lieutenant Frank Hale. Rumey parachutes from his D.VII at 1,000 feet (300 meters) but falls to his death when his parachute fails. His 45 kills will make him the fifth-highest-scoring German ace of World War I.
- September 28 – Flying an Airco DH.9 with the Royal Air Force's No. 218 Squadron, U.S. Marine Corps First Lieutenant Everett R. Brewer (pilot) and Gunnery Sergeant Harry B. Wershiner (observer) become the first U.S. Marine Corps personnel to shoot down an enemy plane in aerial combat. They both are badly wounded during the engagement.
- September 29
  - United States Army Air Service Second Lieutenant Frank Luke flies his final mission, shooting down three German observation balloons near Dun-sur-Meuse, France. Severely wounded by a machine-gun bullet, he lands his plane and tries to reach cover in underbrush near a stream, fires a few rounds from his Colt Model 1911 pistol, then collapses and dies about 200 metres (220 yd) from his plane. Subsequently, a legend arises — based on mistranslations of statements by French eyewitnesses — that he strafed German troops before landing and was found dead with his pistol emptied and seven dead German soldiers around him. When World War I ends, he will be the second-highest-scoring American Expeditionary Force ace of World War I, with 18 victories. He had achieved the victories — 14 observation balloons and four airplanes — during just 10 sorties in eight flying days between September 12 and 29, 1918.
  - Second Lieutenant Chapin Barr becomes the first U.S. Marine Corps pilot to die in aerial combat.
  - German ground-attack aircraft of Schlachtstaffel 3 intervene to support German troops in danger of being overrun by United States Army forces in the Argonne Forest in France. A German officer on the ground reports that the German air attack causes the American troops to break off their attack and scatter "in wild flight."

=== October ===
- The Royal Air Force establishes the Marine Aircraft Experimental Station at Isle of Grain, Kent, to design, test, and evaluate seaplanes, flying boats, and other aircraft connected with naval operations. In March 1924 it will become the Marine Aircraft Experimental Establishment.
- October 3
  - In an attempt to lure Belgian "balloon-busting" ace Baron Willy Coppens to his own destruction, German troops load the basket of an observation balloon in his operating area with explosives and have their artillery open fire on Allied positions in order to attract him to the balloon. When he arrives and attacks the balloon, the Germans detonate the explosives. Although Coppens' blue Hanriot HD.1 flies through the explosion, he emerges uninjured.
  - The Kingdom of Bavaria brings together four Jagdstaffeln ("fighter squadrons") – Jagdstaffeln 23, 32, 34, and 35 – to form its first Jagdgeschwader (fighter wing), the Royal Bavarian Jagdgeschwader IV, with Eduard Ritter von Schleich as its first commanding officer. It is the fifth Jagdeschwader in the German armed forces, and the last to be formed during World War I.
- October 5 – The famed French pilot Lieutenant Roland Garros, who in 1915 had become the first man to shoot down another aircraft by firing a machine gun through a tractor propeller, is shot down and killed in combat near Vouziers, France. He has four victories at the time of his death.
- October 11 – The Imperial German Navy's air command proposes that merchant ships be converted into Germany's first aircraft carriers with flight decks.
- October 12 – The Imperial German Navy's Naval Airship Division flies its last combat mission.
- October 14
  - Baron Willy Coppens, the highest-scoring Belgian ace, shoots down a German observation balloon near Praatbos, Belgium. It is the last of his 37 victories, 34 of them observation balloons. Attacking another German balloon later in the same flight, he is badly wounded near Torhout, Belgium, forcing him to crash-land. World War I ends four weeks later with him as its top-scoring "balloon buster."
  - The first all-U.S. Marine Corps air combat action in history takes place, when five Airco DH.4s and three Airco DH.9s bomb Pitthem, Belgium. On the return flight, German Fokker D.VII and Pfalz D.III fighters attack the bombers. Second Lieutenant Ralph Talbot (pilot) and Gunnery Sergeant Robert Guy Robinson (gunner) become separated from the formation after their DH.4 loses power, then encounter 12 German fighters. Although Robinson is terribly wounded during the resulting dogfight, they hold off the Germans and Talbot lands at a Belgian hospital, where Robinson is treated. For this action, they will become the first U.S. Marine Corps aviators to receive the Medal of Honor during a ceremony on November 11, 1920.
- October 24 – The Battle of Vittorio Veneto begins. During the 11-day battle, the Italian Corpo Aeronautico Militare ("Military Aviation Corps") fields 400 aircraft with which to oppose at least 470 enemy aircraft.
- October 25 – U.S. Marine Corps Second Lieutenant Ralph Talbot dies in a crash during a test flight 11 days after the action for which he will receive a posthumous Medal of Honor in 1920.
- October 27 – Italian ace Pier Ruggero Piccio is shot down by enemy ground fire and captured by Austro-Hungarian troops. He finishes the war with 24 victories, the third-highest-scoring Italian ace of World War I.
- October 28
  - French ace Lieutenant Michel Coiffard is gravely wounded during a dogfight with German Fokker D.VII fighters. He flies back to base, where he dies of his wounds. His 34 kills will make him the sixth-highest scoring French ace of World War I.
  - United States Army Air Service First Lieutenant Field Eugene Kindley and First Lieutenant Jesse Creech share the kill of a German Fokker D.VII near Villers-Pol, France. It is the last of Kindley's 12 aerial victories.
- October 29 – The Danish airline Det Danske Luftfartselskab, trading in the English-speaking world as Danish Air Lines – the oldest airline that still exists – is founded. It will begin flight operations in August 1920.
- October 30 – Flying a SPAD XIII fighter, Eddie Rickenbacker shoots down a German observation balloon near Remonville, France, for his 26th and final aerial victory. His 26 victories (22 airplanes and four balloons) will make him the top-scoring American ace of World War I.

=== November ===
- November 1
  - The French fighter pilot René Fonck scores his 75th and final aerial victory. He ends the war as the highest-scoring Allied ace and second-highest scoring ace overall of World War I.
  - The French Navy, which when World War I began in August 1914 had an aviation force of only eight seaplanes, has expanded its air arm to 37 airships, 1,264 airplanes, and over 11,000 men.
- November 4
  - Austria and Hungary conclude separate ceasefires with the Allies, ending Austria-Hungary′s participation in World War I. The ceasefires bring the more-or-less continuous bombing campaigns of Italy and Austria-Hungary against one another to an end. Since Italy's entry into the war in May 1915, Austria-Hungary has conducted 343 bombing raids against various Italian cities – particularly Mestre, Padua, Treviso, Venice, Verona, and Vicenza – killing 984 people and injuring 1,193, while Italy's bombing targets have included Fiume, Pola, and Trieste.
  - Forty German Fokker D.VIIs attack nine Sopwith Camels of the Royal Air Force's No. 65 Squadron southeast of Ghent, Belgium. Camels of No. 204 Squadron join the action, and in the whirling dogfight which follows the British pilots claim 22 German aircraft either shot down or last seen headed earthward out of control.
- November 9 – French Navy aviation pioneer Paul Teste attempts to take off from a 15-metre (49-foot) platform mounted on the battleship Paris off Corfu — an activity pioneered by the British Royal Navy but not previously attempted in France — but his plane plunges into the sea. Unharmed, he later successfully makes takeoffs from a 15-metre (49-foot) platform mounted on the aviso Bapaume.
- November 11
  - The Armistice with Germany brings World War I to an end. After the signing of the Armistice, all Allied aircraft flying over withdrawing German forces fly streamers attached to their wings to indicate that they have no hostile intent.
  - The Royal Flying Corps, Royal Naval Air Service, and Royal Air Force have suffered 16,623 casualties and the French Aéronautique Militaire approximately 8,500 casualties during World War I, while the German Air Service has suffered in excess of 15,000.
  - Italy′s Corpo Aeronautico Militare ("Military Aviation Corps") finishes the war with a strength of 2,725 aircraft. During the war, 105 Italian factories have manufactured airframes, aero engines, and aviation propellers, producing 11,986 airplanes, almost half under license and only 2,208 made entirely of Italian components.
  - Since the entry of the United States into World War I on April 6, 1917, the United States Marine Corps' aviation force has grown from seven officers and 43 enlisted men to 282 officers and 2,180 enlisted men.
  - The Felixstowe Fury (Porte Super-Baby), largest seaplane in the world and first to incorporate servo-assisted controls, makes its first flight from the Seaplane Experimental Station in England.
- November 15 – Surviving United States Army Air Service pilots serving with bomber squadrons of the Royal Italian Army's Military Aviation Corps on the Italian Front assemble at San Pelagio Airfield outside Padua, Italy, to receive the Italian War Merit Cross. A month later, all will have departed Italy for the United States. During World War I, about 100 U.S. Army Air Service aviators have served with the Italians, accumulating more than 500 combat hours – mostly in Caproni Ca.3 bombers – while taking part in 65 bombing missions.
- November 21 – The Estonian Army begins to organize an aviation service. It is considered the beginning of the history of the Estonian Air Force.

=== December ===
- December 12
  - Captain R. M. Smith, Brigadier General A. E. Borton, and Major General W. Salmond set out in a Handley Page O/400 from Heliopolis to Karachi, to survey a route for airmail to India.
  - An airplane is launched from an airship for the first time, when the U.S. Navy blimp C.1 drops a Curtiss JN-4 into flight over Fort Tilden, New York.
- December 13 – Major A. S. C. MacLaren and Captain Robert Halley set out on the first England-India flight, in a Handley Page V/1500

== First flights ==
- Letord Let.9
- SEA IV
- Siemens-Schuckert D.IV
- Siemens-Schuckert D.V
- Siemens-Schuckert L.I
- Early 1918
  - Orenco B
  - Nieuport-Delage NiD.29
- Summer 1918
  - Breguet 17
  - Farman F.31
- Late 1918 – Victor Scout

=== January ===
- BAT F.K.22

=== February ===
- Nieuport B.N.1
- Vought VE-7

=== March ===
- Airco DH.9A
- March 4 – Airco DH.10 Amiens
- March 6 – Curtiss-Sperry Flying Bomb
- March 10 – Junkers D.I
- March 13 – Marinens Flyvebaatfabrikk M.F.4
- March 21 – Curtiss HA Dunkirk Fighter

=== April ===
- Avro 531 Spider
- Westland Wagtail C4291
- April 5 – Curtiss USAO-1

=== May ===
- BAT F.K.23 Bantam I
- Curtiss CB Battleplane
- Martin K-3
- May 15 – Packard-Le Peré LUSAC-11
- May 22 – Handley Page V/1500

=== June ===
- June 4, 1918 – Zeppelin-Lindau D.I
- June 6 – Fairey III

=== July ===
- July 4 – Engineering Division USB-1
- July 5 – Curtiss 18-T-1 Wasp
- July 15 – Felixstowe F5L
- July 27 – Naval Aircraft Factory N-1

=== August ===
- Loening M-8
- August 7 – Blériot-SPAD S.XX
- August 17 – Martin MB-1
- August 21 – Nieuport-Delage Ni-D 29

=== September ===
- September 5 – Orenco C
- September 19 – Sopwith Buffalo
- September 30 – U.S. Navy C-class blimp

=== October ===
- October 2 – Kettering Bug

=== November ===
- Caudron R.12
- Thomas-Morse MB-2
- Westland Weasel
- November 11 – Felixstowe Fury, also known as the Porte Super-Baby
- November 19 – Marinens Flyvebaatfabrikk M.F.5

=== December ===
- Avro 533 Manchester

== Entered service ==
=== January ===
- Siemens-Schuckert D.III with the German Luftstreitkräfte

=== February ===
- Caudron R.11 with Escadrille R46 of the French Army's Service Aeronautique
- Sopwith Dolphin with No. 19 Squadron and No. 79 Squadron of the British Royal Flying Corps

=== March ===
- Nieuport 28

=== April ===
- Airco DH.9

=== June ===
- Airco DH.9A with the Royal Air Force′s No. 110 Squadron

=== August ===
- Fokker D.VIII with the German Luftstreitkräfte

=== October ===
- Siemens-Schuckert D.IV with German Luftstreitkräfte operational units

=== November ===
- Airco DH.10 Amiens with the Royal Air Force′s No. 104 Squadron
