= Sopwith Snail =

British WW1 biplane fighter aircraft

Snail

General information
- Type: Fighter
- National origin: United Kingdom
- Manufacturer: Sopwith
- Status: Prototype
- Number built: 2

History
- First flight: April 1918

The Sopwith 8F.1 Snail was a prototype British Fighter aircraft of the First World War. It was unsuccessful, being abandoned due to an unreliable engine.

== Development and design ==
The Sopwith 8F.1 Snail was designed by Herbert Smith of Sopwith Aviation Company to meet the Air Board Specification A.1A for a light fighter with superior performance to the Sopwith Camel. Herbert Smith designed a small single-bay biplane, powered by the 170 hp (127 kW) ABC Wasp radial engine. An initial order was placed on 31 October 1917 for six prototypes with a conventional wood and fabric framework structure, but this was revised in November to fit two aircraft with a plywood monocoque fuselage.

The first prototype, serial number C4284, with the conventional fuselage (which resulted in the designation Snail Mk.II) flew in April 1918. Its wings had slight (5 inches (127 mm)) back-stagger, with the pilot sitting under a large cut-out on the upper wing, so that his head would protrude through the cut-out. Armament was two synchronised Vickers machine guns mounted within the fuselage, and a Lewis gun mounted above the upper wing. A second prototype (serial number C4288), with the monocoque fuselage (and thus designated Snail Mk. I) followed in May. As well as the fuselage, the Snail Mk.I differed as the wings, although using identical surfaces were rigged with 22 inches of conventional stagger, with the pilot's cockpit being behind the upper wings trailing edge.

Both prototypes were sent to Martlesham Heath for official testing in May. Although performance was reasonable, being slightly faster than the Camel and climbing faster, handling was poor, particularly at low speed, and as with the other Wasp engined fighters built to meet Specification A.1A, the Wasp engine proved unreliable, with the competition being abandoned in October 1918. The two complete prototypes were broken up for firewood in November 1919.

== Specifications (Second prototype) ==
Data from

General characteristics

- Crew: 1
- Length: 19 ft 0 in (5.79 m)
- Wingspan: 25 ft 4 in (7.72 m)
- Height: 8 ft 3 in (2.51 m)
- Wing area: 250 sq ft (23 m^{2})
- Empty weight: 1,390 lb (630 kg)
- Gross weight: 1,920 lb (871 kg)
- Powerplant: 1 × ABC Wasp seven-cylinder air-cooled radial engine, 170 hp (130 kW)

Performance

- Maximum speed: 124.5 mph (200.4 km/h, 108.2 kn) at 10,000 ft (3,000 m)
- Time to altitude:
  - 9 min 55 sec to 10,000 ft (3,000 m)
  - 19 min 55 sec to 15,000 ft (4,600 m)

Armament

- Guns: 2 × forward firing, synchronised .303 in Vickers machine guns and one Lewis gun above upper wing

== See also ==
Aircraft of comparable role, configuration, and era

- BAT Bantam
- Westland Wagtail
