= Westland Wagtail =

Prototype military aircraft

Wagtail

General information
- Type: Fighter
- National origin: United Kingdom
- Manufacturer: Westland Aircraft
- Status: Prototype
- Number built: 5

History
- First flight: April 1918

The Westland Wagtail was a prototype British fighter aircraft of the First World War. A single-engined tractor biplane, the Wagtail was a failure owing to the unreliability of its engine, only five being built.

== Development and design ==
The Westland Wagtail was designed by Westland Aircraft of Yeovil in 1917 to meet the Royal Air Force Specification IA for a light fighter with superior performance to the Sopwith Camel. Westland's design team, led by Robert Bruce, the Company's manager and Arthur Davenport, Chief Draughtsman, came up with a design for a small single bay biplane, powered (like the other competitors for the Specification, the BAT Bantam and the Sopwith Snail) by the 170 hp (127 kW) ABC Wasp radial engine. The Wagtail was of conventional wood and fabric construction, with the upper wing centre-section having a large cut-out to improve the pilot's view, and carrying an armament of two Vickers machine guns mounted over the nose.

An order for six prototypes was placed in February 1918, (although the last two were later cancelled) with the first airframe being used for structural tests and not flown. Delays in delivery of engines delayed flight testing of the Wagtail, with the first to fly, serial number C4291, flying in April 1918, two months after the airframe was complete. Testing showed that handling of the Wagtail was good, but also quickly showed that the Wasp was unreliable. Although the Wagtail proved the best of the three Wasp-engined fighters tested, the Wasp was officially abandoned in October 1918, which together with the end of the war on 11 November, resulted in it not being adopted as a fighter.

Despite this, two further Wagtails were ordered in 1920, as testbeds for the new 150 hp (112 kW) Armstrong Siddeley Lynx radial. These two aircraft, which had a shorter nose to compensate for the heavier engine, were delivered in 1921 and remained in use until August 1922.

== Specifications ==
Data from Westland Aircraft since 1915, Janes

General characteristics

- Crew: 1
- Length: 18 ft 11 in (5.77 m)
- Wingspan: 23 ft 2 in (7.06 m)
- Height: 8 ft (2.4 m)
- Wing area: 190 sq ft (18 m^{2})
- Airfoil: RAF 15
- Empty weight: 746 lb (338 kg)
- Gross weight: 1,330 lb (603 kg)
- Fuel capacity: 20 imp gal (24 US gal; 91 L)
- Oil capacity: 3 imp gal (3.6 US gal; 14 L)
- Powerplant: 1 × ABC Wasp 7-cylinder air-cooled radial engine, 170 hp (130 kW) at 1,900 rpm
- Propellers: 2-bladed wooden, 8 ft 6 in (2.59 m) diameter with 6 ft 9 in (2.07 m) pitch

Performance

- Maximum speed: 125 mph (201 km/h, 109 kn) at 10,000 ft (3,000 m)
- Endurance: 2hours 30 minutes at 15,000 ft (4,600 m)
- Service ceiling: 20,000 ft (6,100 m)
- Rate of climb: 1,429 ft/min (7.26 m/s)
- Time to altitude: 5,000 ft (1,500 m) in 3 minutes 30 seconds; 10,000 ft (3,000 m) in 7 minutes 30 seconds; 17,000 ft (5,200 m) in 17 minutes
- Wing loading: 7 lb/sq ft (34 kg/m^{2})
- Power/mass: 0.13 hp/lb (0.213 kW/kg)

Armament

- Guns: 2x forward firing, synchronised 0.303 in (7.7 mm) Vickers machine guns

== See also ==
Aircraft of comparable role, configuration, and era

- BAT Bantam
- Sopwith Snail
