= ABC Wasp =

R-7 piston aircraft engine

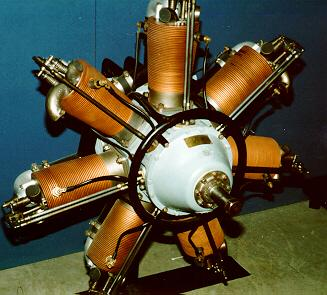
- The WASP engine
- Type: Radial engine
- National origin: United Kingdom
- Manufacturer: ABC Motors
- Designer: Granville Bradshaw
- First run: 1916
- Number built: 56

The ABC Wasp was an experimental 170 hp (127 kW) seven-cylinder radial engine designed by the noted British engineer Granville Bradshaw, and primarily built by ABC Motors Limited. An order for twelve experimental ABC Wasp engines was placed with Guy Motors on 19 April 1918. Eight ABC Wasp engines were made by Crossley Motors Ltd of Manchester, England.

== Design and development ==
The ABC Wasp was one of the first large non-rotary air-cooled radials. At a weight of 290 pounds (131 kg), it had a reasonable power-to-weight ratio at 0.6 horsepower per pound. This World War I–era engine is noteworthy because it was one of the first in which the cylinders were coated with copper in an attempt to dissipate heat. The ABC Wasp never evolved beyond the experimental stage, but it was the predecessor of the unsuccessful Dragonfly engine.

== Variants ==
Wasp I
1918, 160 hp (119 kW) 4.5 in × 5.9 in (110 mm × 150 mm)
Wasp II
1919, 200 hp (149 kW) 4.75 in × 6.25 in (121 mm × 159 mm)

== Applications ==
Wasp I

- Avro 504K
- BAT Bantam
- BAT Baboon
- Sopwith Snail
- Westland Wagtail

Wasp II

- Avro 504K
- BAT Bantam
- Saunders Kittiwake
- Sopwith Snail
- Westland Wagtail

== Specifications (Wasp I) ==
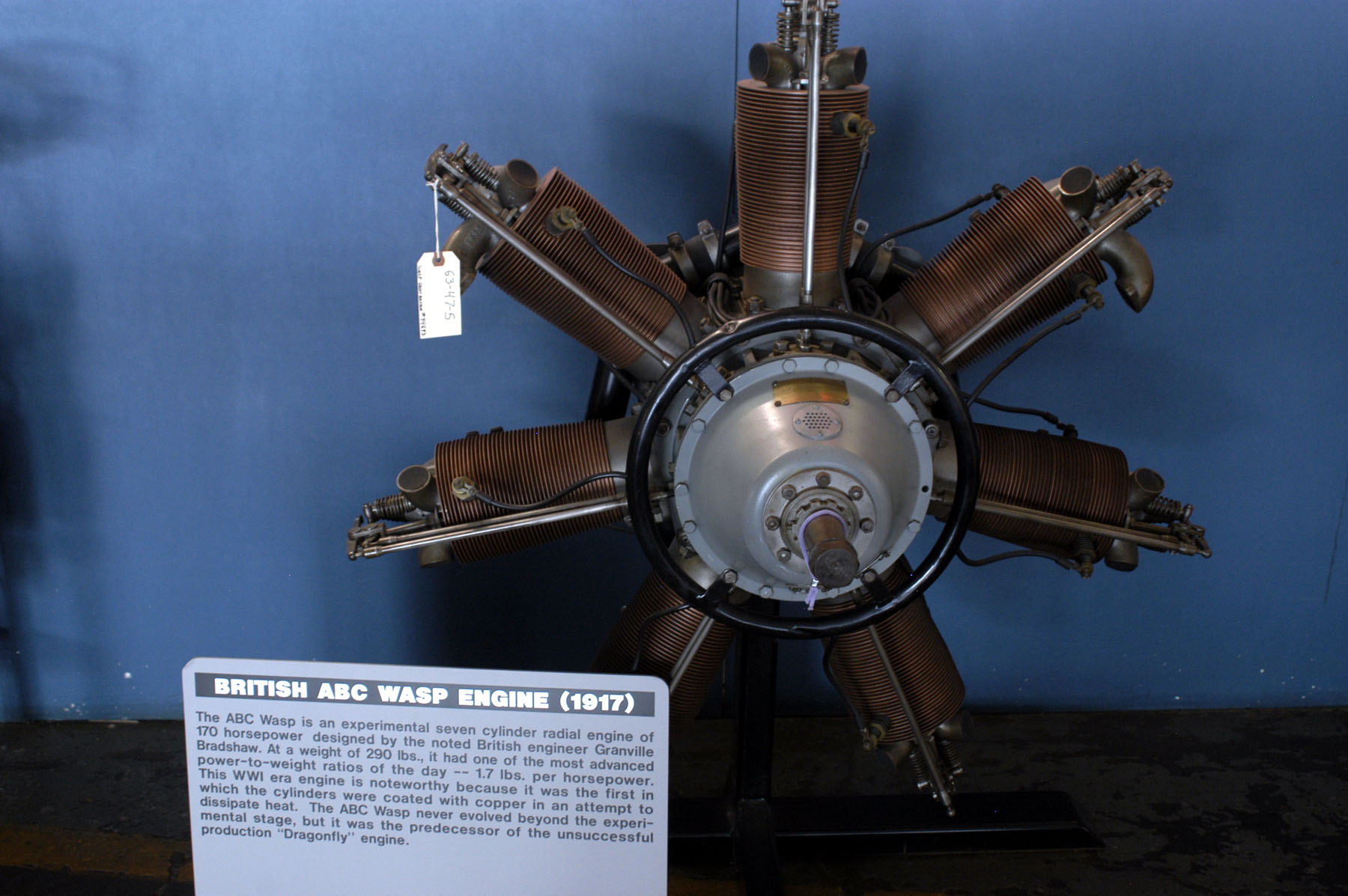
The ABC Wasp on display.

Data from Lumsden.

=== General characteristics ===
- Type: 7-cylinder air-cooled radial
- Bore: 4.53 in (115 mm)
- Stroke: 5.9 in (150 mm)
- Displacement: 667.1 cu in (10.78 L)
- Diameter: 42 in (1,067 mm)
- Dry weight: 290 lb (131 kg)

=== Components ===
- Fuel system: 2 Claudel-Hobson Carburettors
- Fuel type: 40–50 octane petrol
- Cooling system: Air-cooled

=== Performance ===
- Power output: 185 hp (138 kW) at 1,750 rpm
- Compression ratio: 4.05:1
- Power-to-weight ratio: 0.63 hp/lb (1.05 kW/kg)

== See also ==
Related development

- ABC Dragonfly

Related lists

- List of aircraft engines
