= BAT F.K.26 =

F.K.26
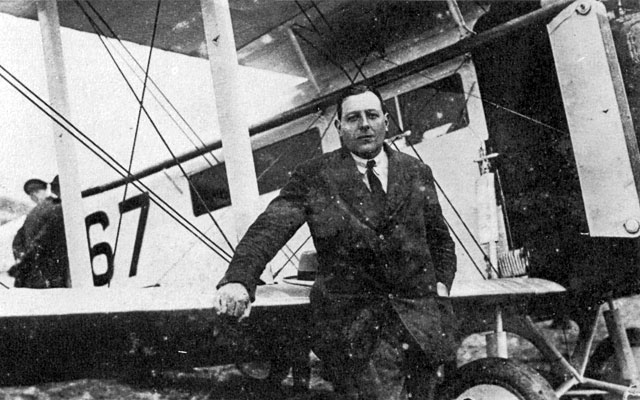
- Frederick Koolhoven with BAT F.K.26

General information
- Type: Biplane Transport
- Manufacturer: British Aerial Transport Company Limited
- Designer: Frederick Koolhoven
- Primary user: Instone Air Line
- Number built: 4

History
- First flight: 1919

The BAT F.K.26 was a British single-engined four-passenger biplane transport aircraft produced by British Aerial Transport Company Limited of London at the end of World War I.

== Design and development ==
As the First World War drew to a close the aircraft designer Frederick Koolhoven designed a civil four-passenger wooden and fabric civil transport, the F.K.26. The four passengers had an enclosed cabin and the pilot sat above and behind the cabin in an open cockpit. The prototype (Registered K-102) first flew in April 1919. The second aircraft was displayed at the First Air Traffic Exhibition in Amsterdam in July 1919. The third machine (also known as the BAT Commercial Mk 1) was displayed at the Olympia Aero Show in July 1920. The fourth aircraft (Registered G-EAPK), built in November 1919, was the last aircraft produced by the British Aerial Transport Company (BAT). G-EAPK was sold to Instone Air Line and was based at Croydon Airport for charter work and scheduled services to Paris.

When the company closed, Koolhoven returned to Netherlands. He later bought G-EEAI (the prototype) and exhibited it at the 1937 Netherlands Aero Show.

== Operators ==
United Kingdom

- Instone Air Line operated 1 aircraft.

== Specifications (F.K.26) ==
Data from Jane's All the World's Aircraft 1919 British Civil Aircraft since 1919: Volume 1

General characteristics

- Crew: 1
- Capacity: 4 passengers or 1,000 lb (453.59 kg)
- Length: 34 ft 8 in (10.57 m)
- Wingspan: 46 ft (14 m)
- Height: 11 ft 3 in (3.43 m)
- Wing area: 580 sq ft (54 m^{2})
- Empty weight: 2,700 lb (1,225 kg)
- Max takeoff weight: 4,500 lb (2,041 kg)
- Fuel capacity: 100 imp gal (454.61 L; 120.09 US gal)
- Powerplant: 1 × Rolls-Royce Eagle VII V-12 water-cooled piston engine, 350 hp (260 kW) at 1,450 rpm
- Propellers: 4-bladed B.A.T. tractor 8 ft 6 in (2.59 m) pitch, 11 ft (3.4 m) diameter

Performance

- Maximum speed: 122 mph (196 km/h, 106 kn)
- Landing speed: 50 mph (43 kn; 80 km/h)
- Range: 600 mi (970 km, 520 nmi)
- Endurance: 6 hours at ¾ throttle
- Service ceiling: 18,000 ft (5,500 m)
- Rate of climb: 1,250 ft/min (6.4 m/s)
- Time to altitude:
  - 5,000 ft (1,524.00 m) in 4 minutes
  - 10,000 ft (3,048.00 m) in 10 minutes
- Wing loading: 7.7 lb/sq ft (38 kg/m^{2})
- Power/mass: 0.77 hp/lb (0.127 kW/kg)

== See also ==
Aircraft of comparable role, configuration, and era

- DH.4A
- Ryan Standard
