= British Aerial Transport =

British aircraft manufacturer

British Aerial Transport Company Limited (BAT) was a British aircraft manufacturer from its formation in 1917 to its closure in 1919. The company was based at Willesden, London.

== History ==
The company was formed in 1917 by Samuel Waring around the combined knowledge of Frederick Koolhoven, as Chief Designer, and Robert Noorduyn as Chief Draughtsman. Koolhoven's first design for the company was the F.K.22 fighter. In 1919 Lord Waring reduced his aviation interests and this forced the closure of the company. The fourth F.K.26 was the last aircraft built by the company.

== Aircraft designs ==
- BAT F.K.20 (1917) shipboard biplane fighter (project)
- BAT F.K.21 (1917) biplane trainer (project)
- BAT F.K.22 (1918) Single-engine single-seat fighter aircraft
- BAT F.K.23 Bantam (1918) Single-engine single-seat fighter
- BAT F.K.24 Baboon (1918) Single-engine biplane training aircraft
- BAT Basilisk (F.K.25) (1918) Single-engined single-seat fighter aircraft
- BAT F.K.26 (1919) Single-engine four-passenger biplane transport aircraft
- BAT F.K.27 (1919) Two-seat single engine sporting biplane
- BAT F.K.28 Crow (1920) Single-engine single-seat ultralight aircraft
