= Sopwith Dragon =

British WW1 biplane fighter aircraft

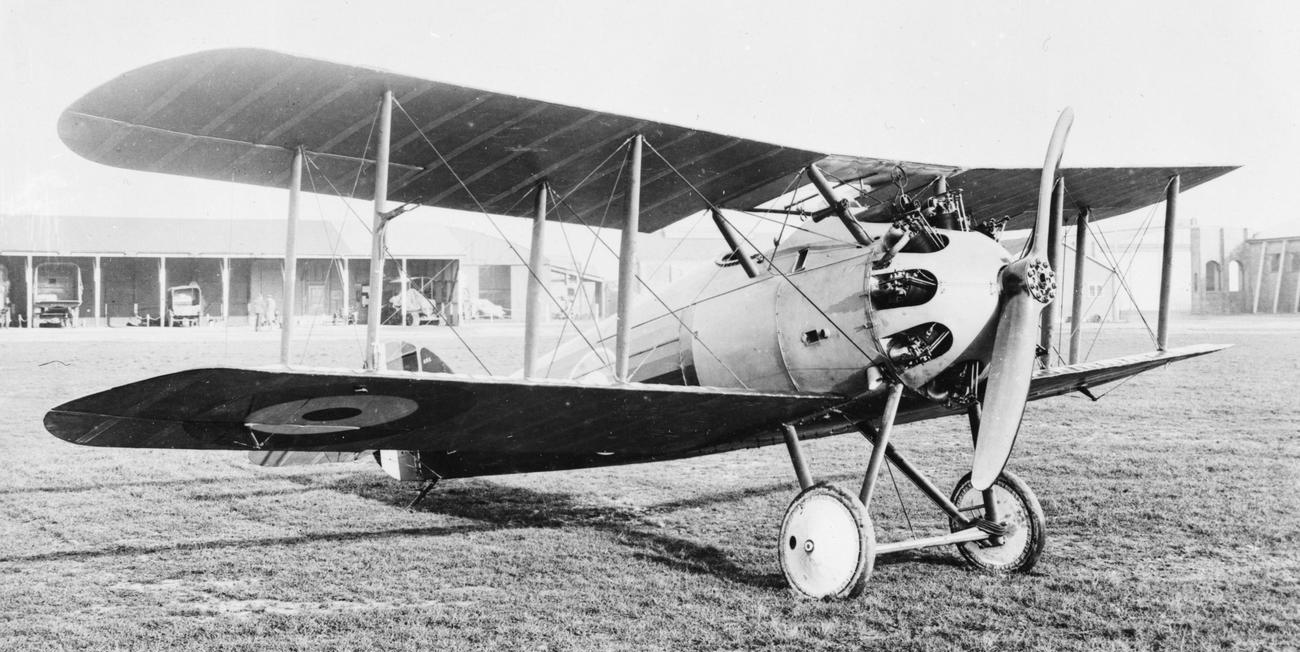
- Prototype E7990 at Brooklands Airfield

General information
- Type: Fighter
- Manufacturer: Sopwith Aviation Company
- Primary user: Royal Air Force
- Number built: 200

History
- First flight: 1918
- Developed from: Sopwith Snipe

The Sopwith Dragon was a British single-seat fighter biplane developed from the Sopwith Snipe.

== Design and development ==
In April 1918, the sixth Snipe prototype was fitted with a 320 hp (239 kW) ABC Dragonfly I radial engine. To compensate for the greater weight of the Dragonfly, the fuselage was lengthened by 22 in (56 cm).

The prototype suffered persistent ignition system defects, but performance was encouraging when the Dragonfly engine operated properly. In June 1918, the Royal Air Force issued a contract for 30 Dragonfly-engined Snipes, which were subsequently named Dragons. In late November 1918, the RAF cancelled a production order for 300 Snipes and reordered the aircraft as Dragons.

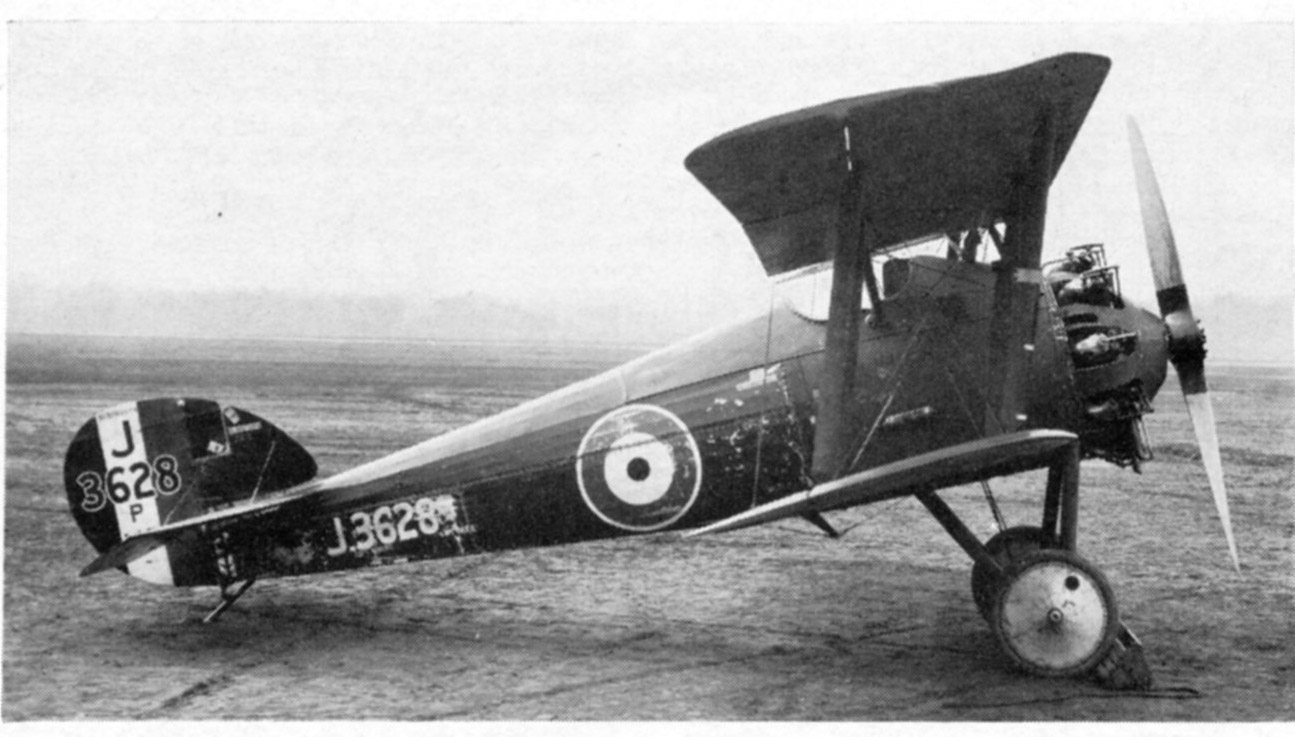
Sopwith Dragon undergoing testing at McCook Field

A second prototype was equipped with the larger 360 hp (268 kW) ABC Dragonfly IA engine. This aircraft did not begin official trials at Martlesham Heath until February 1919. It attained a top speed of 150 mph (240 km/h) at sea level and achieved a service ceiling of 25,000 ft.

Sopwith built approximately 200 Dragon airframes, which were placed in storage pending delivery of their engines. Difficulties with the Dragonfly ultimately proved impossible to resolve. Only a few aircraft were completed with Dragonfly engines, and none were issued to squadrons. The Dragon was finally declared obsolete in April 1923.

== Operators ==
United Kingdom

- Royal Air Force

== Specifications ==
Data from War Planes of the First World War: Volume Three Fighters

General characteristics

- Crew: 1
- Length: 21 ft 9 in (6.63 m)
- Wingspan: 31 ft 1 in (9.47 m)
- Height: 9 ft 6 in (2.9 m)
- Wing area: 271 sq ft (25.2 m^{2})
- Gross weight: 2,132 lb (967 kg)
- Powerplant: 1 × ABC Dragonfly IA radial engine , 360 hp (268 kW)

Performance

- Maximum speed: 150 mph (240 km/h, 130 kn)
- Service ceiling: 25,000 ft (7,600 m)

Armament

- 2 × forward firing Vickers machine-guns

== See also ==
Related development

- Sopwith Snipe
- Sopwith Salamander

Related lists

- List of aircraft of the Royal Air Force
