= BAT Bantam =

British fighter biplane of WWI

F.K.23 Bantam
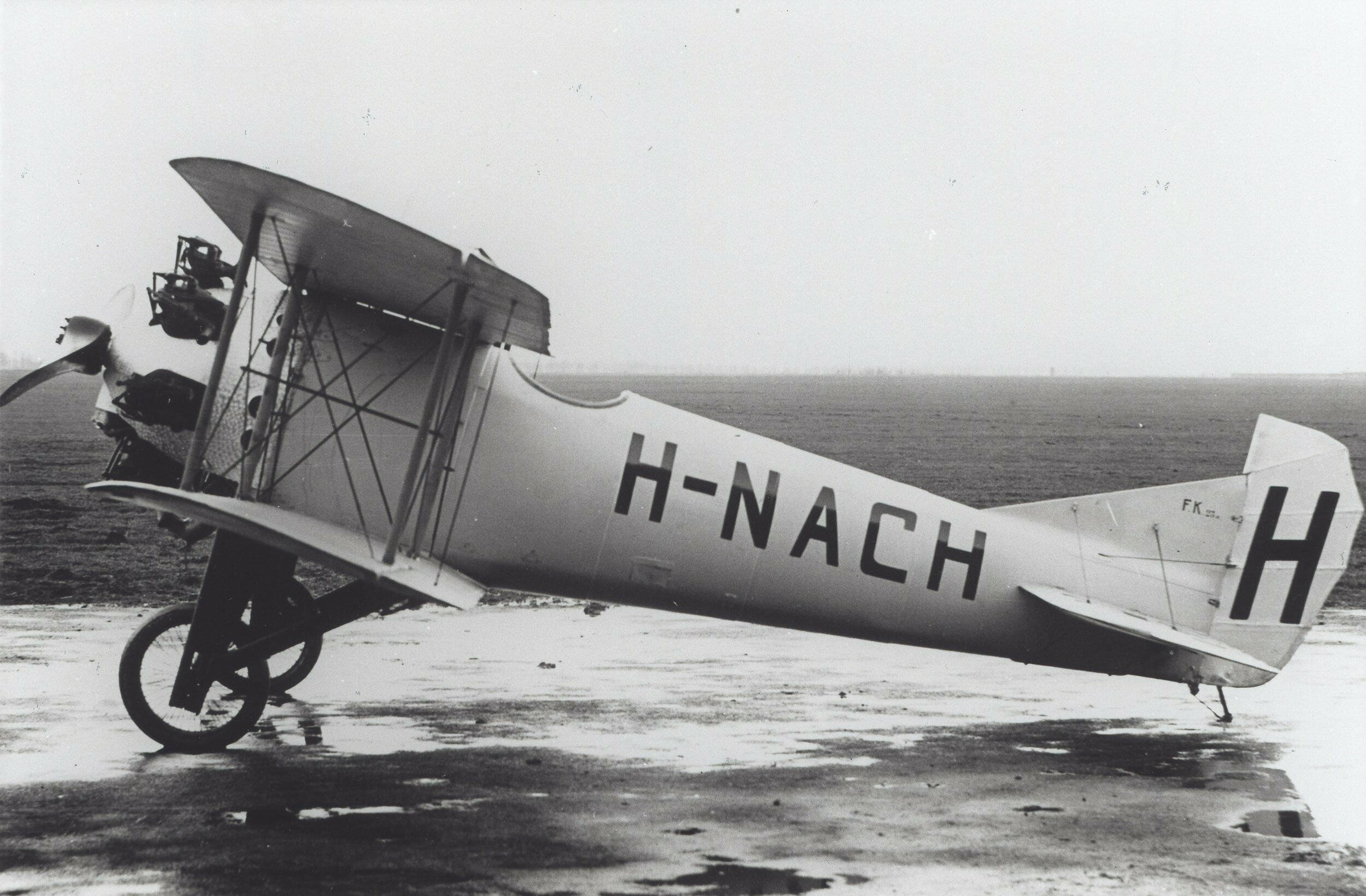
- Koolhoven/BAT F.K.23 Bantam in Rotterdam

General information
- Type: Single-seat fighter
- Manufacturer: British Aerial Transport Company Limited
- Designer: Frederick Koolhoven
- Primary user: Royal Air Force
- Number built: 15

History
- Introduction date: 1921
- First flight: 1918

The BAT F.K.23 Bantam was a British single-seat fighter biplane produced by British Aerial Transport Company Limited of London during World War I.

== Design and development ==
Frederick Koolhoven's first design for the British Aerial Transport Company (BAT) was the F.K.22 single-seat fighter. It was a two-bay biplane of wooden construction. It was planned to have a 120 hp (90 kW) A.B.C Mosquito radial engine but the failure of this engine led to the installation of the 170 hp (127 kW) A.B.C.Wasp I in the first and third aircraft. The second machine was fitted with a 100 hp (75 kW) Gnome Monosoupape rotary engine and was the first to fly at Martlesham Heath in January 1918. The original contract called for six development aircraft but three aircraft were built as the F.K.23 Bantam I, the second prototype then being renamed the Bantam II. The Bantam I was the same wooden structure but was slightly smaller. Two further prototypes of the larger design were also built followed by at least 9 development aircraft. One aircraft was delivered to the Royal Aircraft Establishment on 26 July 1918, one was delivered to the French at Villacoublay and a further aircraft to the United States Army Air Corps at Wright Field in 1922.

The production Bantam had to be modified due to unsatisfactory spin characteristics of the prototypes. Continuous engine problems and downsizing of the Royal Air Force were factors in no more orders for the Bantam. Koolhoven returned to Netherlands with one aircraft where it was re-engined with a 200 hp (149 kW) Armstrong Siddeley Lynx radial engine. Several examples were operated as civil racing aircraft.

== Variants ==
F.K.22 Bantam I
Prototypes and evaluation version, 2 built.
F.K.23 Bantam II
Production aircraft, 3 prototypes + 9 aircraft were built.

== Operators ==
France

- French Air Force received 1 aircraft for evaluation.

Netherlands

- Koolhoven factory operated 1 aircraft.

United Kingdom

- Royal Air Force operated 1 aircraft.

United States

- United States Army Air Corps received 1 aircraft for evaluation.

== Survivors ==
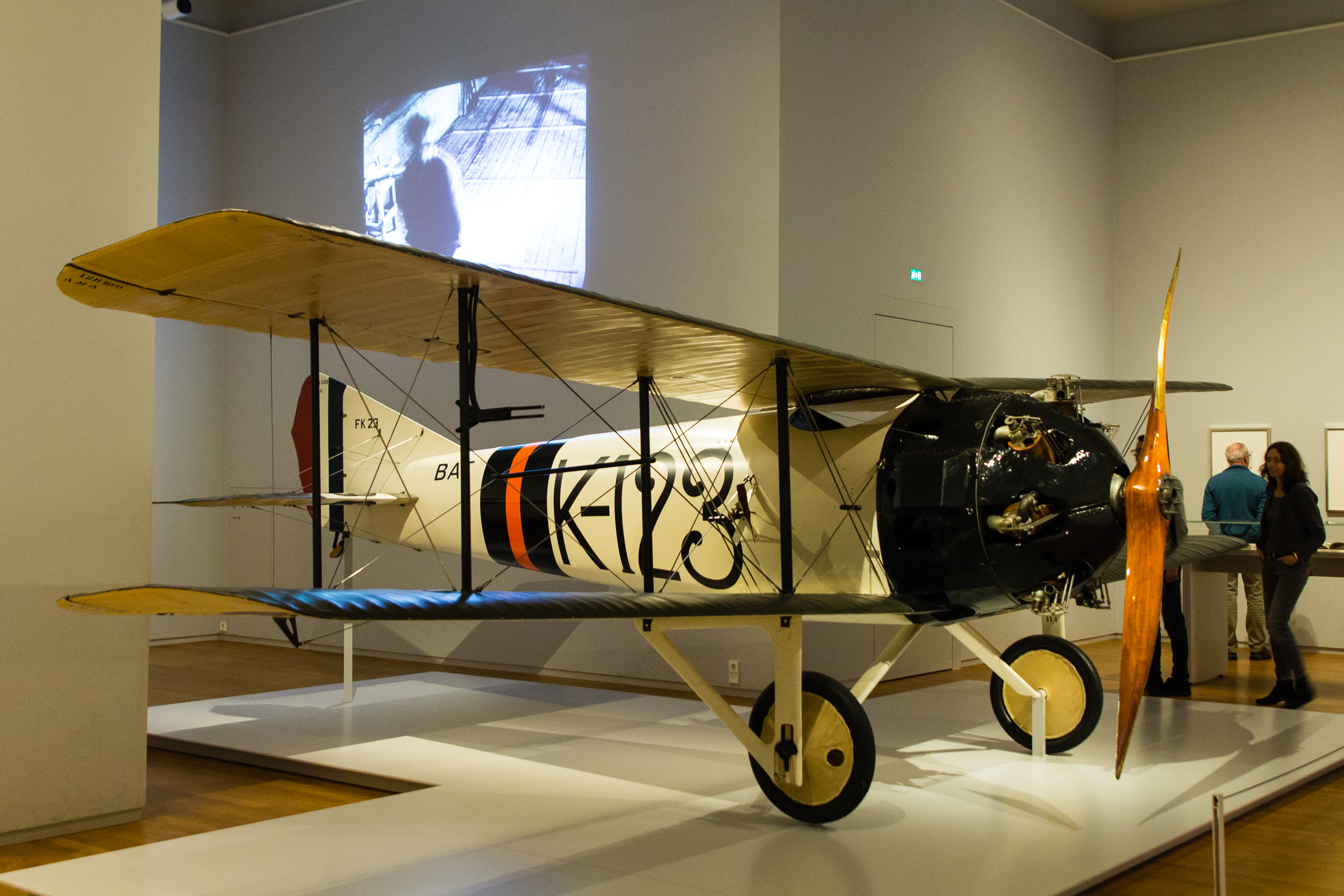
K-123 on display at the Rijksmuseum

- One aircraft, registered K-123, originally on display at the Aviodome, Netherlands. The airplane was acquired by the Rijksmuseum in Amsterdam.
- The remains of a second FK 23 are used to build a flying example. It is a project from the "vroege vogels" from Lelystad in the Netherlands.

== Specifications (F.K.23 Bantam) ==
Data from Jane's All the World's Aircraft 1919 War Planes of the First World War: Fighters Volume One

General characteristics

- Crew: 1
- Capacity: 378 lb (171.46 kg) disposable load
- Length: 18 ft 5 in (5.61 m)
- Wingspan: 25 ft (7.6 m)
- Height: 8 ft 2 in (2.49 m)
- Wing area: 185 sq ft (17.2 m^{2})
- Empty weight: 830 lb (376 kg)
- Gross weight: 1,333 lb (605 kg)
- Fuel capacity: 22 imp gal (100.01 L; 26.42 US gal)
- Powerplant: 1 × ABC Wasp II 7-cyl. air-cooled radial piston engine, 200 hp (150 kW)
- Propellers: 2-bladed BAT tractor 5 ft 4 in (1.63 m) pitch, 7 ft 10.5 in (2.400 m) diameter

Performance

- Maximum speed: 138 mph (222 km/h, 120 kn) at sea level

- 134 mph (216 km/h; 116 kn) at 10,000 ft (3,048.00 m)
- 127 mph (204 km/h; 110 kn) at 15,000 ft (4,572.00 m)
- 121 mph (195 km/h; 105 kn) at 20,000 ft (6,096.00 m)

- Landingspeed: 50 mph (80 km/h; 43 kn)
- Endurance: 3 hours 30 minutes
- Service ceiling: 20,000 ft (6,100 m)
- Rate of climb: 1,579 ft/min (8.02 m/s)
- Time to altitude: 5,000 ft (1,524.00 m) in 3 minutes 10 seconds

- 10,000 ft (3,048.00 m) in 7 minutes 12 seconds
- 15,000 ft (4,572.00 m) in 21 minutes 29 seconds

- Wing loading: 7.2 lb/sq ft (35 kg/m^{2})
- Power/mass: 0.1274 hp/lb (0.21 kW/kg)

Armament

- Guns: 2× forward firing, synchronised 0.303 in (7.7 mm) Vickers machine guns
