= List of aircraft of Canada's air forces =

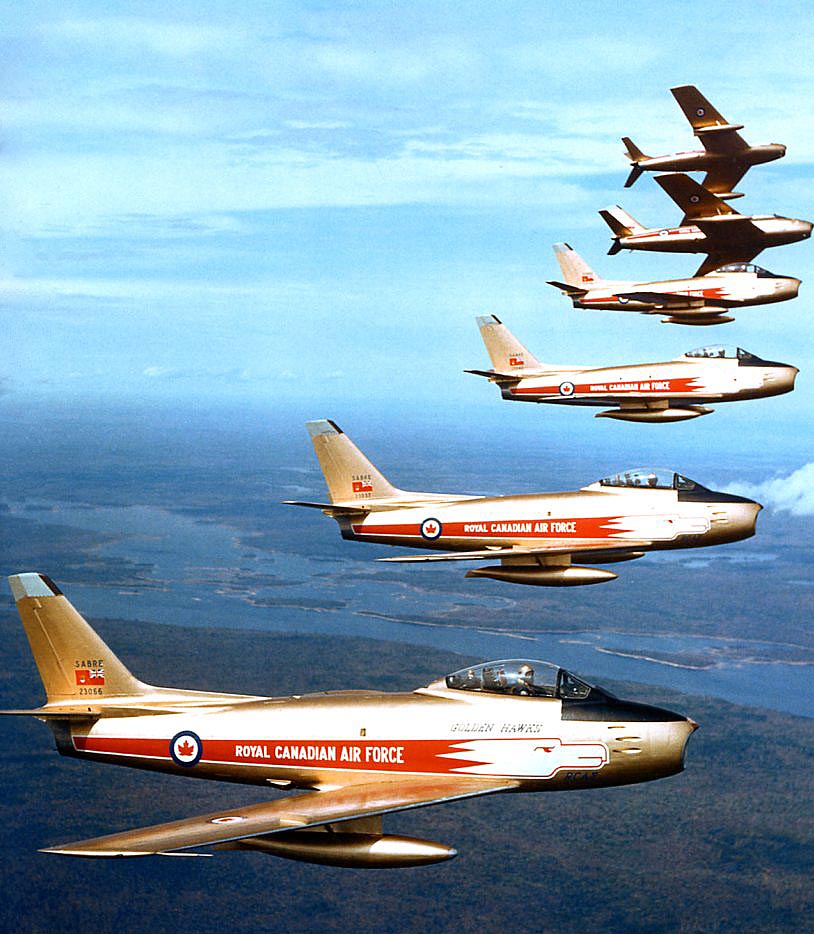
RCAF Golden Hawks Canadair Sabres

This is a list of aircraft of Canada's air forces.
Aircraft are listed for the following organizations:

- Canadian Aviation Corps (1914–1915) which operated a single Burgess-Dunne tailless floatplane
- Canadian Air Force (CAF) (1920–1924) while under the control of the Air Board.
- Royal Canadian Air Force (RCAF) (1924–1968) until amalgamated with the Royal Canadian Navy and Canadian Army to form a unified Canadian Forces.
- Canadian Forces (CAF/CF) (1968–2011) until Canadian Forces Air Command renamed Royal Canadian Air Force again
- Royal Canadian Air Force (2011–current)

This list only includes aircraft owned by the Canadian government, and excludes aircraft flown by Canadian pilots serving with the Royal Flying Corps, Royal Flying Corps Canada or Royal Air Force, including the Article XV squadrons.

From 1917 to November 1918 the British government funded and operated the Royal Flying Corps Canada (later Royal Air Force Canada) which trained aviators on the approximately 1,210 Curtiss Canucks built in Canada, 120 Curtiss JN-4s built in the US, as well as two Avro 504s and one Airco DH.6 built in Canada.

In 1918 the Canadian government formed the Canadian Air Force in Europe which consisted of two wings integrated into the normal Royal Air Force command structure, equipped with Sopwith Dolphins, Royal Aircraft Factory SE.5as and Airco DH.9As supplied and owned by the RAF. It was disbanded in 1920. When the war ended some of these same types were offered to Canada as a part of the Imperial Gift, along with a batch of Fokker D.VIIs captured from Germany, which aside from some illicit flights were relegated primarily to storage and use as instructional airframes.

Independently of the RCAF, the Royal Canadian Navy (RCN) also operated aircraft; upon unification, CAF/CF assumed operational responsibility for all remaining RCN Canadair CT-133 Silver Star, Grumman CS2F Tracker, Sikorsky HO4S-3, and Sikorsky CHSS-2 Sea King aircraft.

== Designations ==
During the First World War no official standards existed for the naming of aircraft and so all designations at this time were assigned by the original manufacturer and both numbers and names were used. From 1918, aircraft were given names based on a set of rules, and individual variants designated numerically as mark I, mark II, etc. as per RAF practice, including aircraft purchased from American sources. For more information on specifics of the system, see British military aircraft designation systems. Aircraft purchased from local sources often retained their original commercial names such as with the Barkley-Grow T8P-1 or the Waco AQC-6, particularly if purchased in small numbers, impressed or not purchased from the original manufacturer. CF-100 and CF-105 were Avro Canada company designations that preceded similar RCAF designations that became the basis for the Canadian Forces designations instituted in February 1968. Unlike the US designation system, there is only a single sequence rather than separate sequences for each role, and numbering started at 100, prefixed with C (for Canada) and a role letter or letters. According to R. W. Walker. 102 and 103 were not used in the CF system to avoid confusion with Avro's use of those numbers for the cancelled Avro Canada C-102 Jetliner and the Avro Canada CF-103 interceptor project.

== Aircraft listing ==
Type	1968 CF designator	Origin	Primary role(s)	Introduced	Status	No.	Notes
Advanced Ceramics Research Silver Fox	CU-167	UK	UAV	2004	?	4+	
AeroVironment RQ-11 Raven	n/a	US	UAV	n/a	n/a	n/a	
AeroVironment RQ-20 Puma	n/a	US	UAV	2018	n/a	n/a	
AgustaWestland CH-149 Cormorant	CH-149	UK/Italy	SAR helicopter	2001	14 in service (+2 on order)	17	
Airbus CC-150 Polaris	CC-150	France	transport/tanker	1992	5 In service	5	(Note: Airbus A310-304/304F)
Airbus CC-295 Kingfisher	CC-295	Spain	SAR	2019	1 In service	16	
Airbus CC-330 Husky	CC-330	France	tanker/transport/VIP transport	2023	5 in service	9	
Airbus H135 Juno	CT-153	France	training helicopter	2026	1 in service	19	
Airco DH.4	n/a	UK	bomber, utility	1920	Retired 1928	12	
Airco DH.9A	n/a	UK	bomber, utility	1920	Retired 1929	12	
Airspeed Horsa	n/a	UK	transport glider	1948	Retired 1959	3	
Airspeed Oxford	n/a	UK	trainer	1939	Retired 1947	819	
Armstrong Whitworth Atlas	n/a	UK	army co-operation, reconnaissance	1927	Retired 1942	16	
Armstrong Whitworth Siskin	n/a	UK	fighter, air demonstration	1926	Retired 1942	12	
Auster AOP.6 & T.7	n/a	UK	army co-operation, reconnaissance	1948	Retired 1958	42	
Avro 504	n/a	UK	trainer, general utility	1920	Retired 1934	97	(Note: 2 examples built in Canada during World War I)
Avro 552 Viper	n/a	Canada	forestry fire patrol, trainer	1924	Retired 1928	14	
Avro Avian Mk.IVM	n/a	UK	transport, trainer	1929	Retired 1945	29	
Avro 621 Tutor	n/a	UK	trainer	1931	Retired 1945	6	
Avro 626 Prefect	n/a	UK	trainer	1937	Retired 1945	12	
Avro Anson	n/a	UK/Canada	bomber, trainer	1940	Retired 1954	4,413	
Avro Lancaster	n/a	UK	bomber, maritime patrol, photographic reconnaissance	1944	Retired 1965	229	
Avro Lincoln	n/a	UK/Canada	bomber	1946	Retired 1948	3	
Avro Wright	n/a	Canada	forestry patrol	1925	Retired 1930	1	
Avro Canada CF-105 Arrow	CF-105	Canada	interceptor fighter	1958	Retired 1959	5	
Avro Canada CF-100 Canuck	CF-100	Canada	fighter, EW trainer	1951	Retired 1981	692	
BAE Systems Hawk	CT-155	UK	advanced jet trainer	2000	Retired 2024	22	
BAE Systems Silver Fox	n/a	UK	UAV	2004	4+ in service	4+	
Barkley-Grow T8P-1	n/a	US	transport	1939	Retired 1941	1	(Note: Impressed)
Beechcraft Expeditor	CT-128	US	transport/trainer	1941	Retired 1972	398	
Beechcraft Harvard II	CT-156	US	trainer	2000	24 in service	26	
Beechcraft King Air	CT-145	US	transport/trainer	1992	7 in service	8	
Beechcraft Mentor	n/a	US	trainer	1954	Retired 1956	25	
Beechcraft Musketeer	CT-134	US	trainer	1970	Retired 1992	48	
Bell 47D & G	n/a	US	transport helicopter	1948	Retired 1965	9	
Bell Griffon	CH-146	Canada	transport helicopter	1994	85 in service	100	
Bell Iroquois	CH-118	US/Canada	transport helicopter	1968	Surviving 9 retired 1997	10	
Bell Jet Ranger	CH-139	US	transport helicopter	1981	Retired 1993	14	
Bell Kiowa	CH-136	US	transport helicopter	1971	Retired 1997	74	
Bell Twin Huey	CH-135	US	transport helicopter	1971	Retired 1999	50	
Bellanca CH-300 Pacemaker	n/a	US	transport	1929	Retired 1944	13	
Blackburn Shark Mk.II & III	n/a	UK	bomber	1936	Retired 1944	26	
Boeing 247D	n/a	US	transport	1940	Retired 1942	8	
Boeing Bomarc	CIM-108	US	surface-to-air guided missile	1961	Retired 1972	56	-->
Boeing CC-137	CC-137	US	transport/tanker	1970	Retired 1997	5	(Note: Boeing 707-347C)
Boeing Fortress Mk.II	n/a	US	patrol/transport	1943	Retired 1946	6	
Boeing Globemaster III	CC-177	US	transport	2007	5 in service	5	
Boeing Insitu ScanEagle	CU-169	US	UAV	2008	in service	?	
Boeing Stratojet	n/a	US	engine testbed	1956	Retired 1959	1	(Note: loaned from USAF for Arrow engine development)
Boeing CH-47C Chinook	CH-147	US	transport helicopter	1974	Retired 1991	8	
Boeing CH-47D Chinook	CH-147D	US	transport helicopter	2008	Retired 2011	6+1 Leased	
Boeing CH-47F Chinook	CH-147F	US	transport helicopter	2013	15 in service	15	
Boeing P-8A Poseidon	CP-8A	US	Multi-mission/maritime patrol	2027	0 in service	14 on order plus 2 options	
Brewster Bermuda	n/a	US	bomber	1943	Retired 1946	3	
Bristol Beaufort	n/a	UK	bomber	1941	Retired 1944	15	
Bristol Blenheim Mk.IV	n/a	UK	bomber/trainer	1941	Retired 1945	1	
Bristol F.2B Fighter	n/a	UK	fighter	1920	Retired 1922	2	
Bristol Fairchild Bolingbroke	n/a	Canada	bomber/trainer	1939	Retired 1947	626	(Note: Canadian variant of Bristol Blenheim)
Bristol Freighter	n/a	UK	transport	1952	Retired 1967	6	
Burgess-Dunne	n/a	US	reconnaissance	1914	Retired 1914	1	(Note: Canada's first military aircraft)
Canadair Argus	CP-107	Canada	patrol	1957	Retired 1988	33	
Canadair C-5 North Star	n/a	Canada	transport	1950	Retired 1967	1	
Canadair CF-5 Freedom Fighter	CF-116	Canada	fighter/ground attack	1968	Retired 1995	133	(Note: Northrop F-5 built under licence)
Canadair Challenger	CC-144	Canada	transport/trainer/patrol	1983	4 in service	18	
Canadair Cosmopolitan	CC-109	Canada	transport	1960	Retired 1994	13	(Note: modified Convair CV-240.)
Canadair CL-84 Dynavert	CX-131	Canada	experimental VTOL	1969	Retired 1975	3	
Canadair North Star	n/a	Canada	transport	1947	Retired 1966	24	(Note: Douglas C-54 re-engined with Merlins)
Canadair Sabre	n/a	Canada	fighter	1950	Retired 1977	1,184	(Note: improved F-86)
Canadair Silver Star	CT-133	Canada	trainer/EW	1953	Retired 2005	656	(Note: improved T-33 trainer, retired from flying 2002.)
Canadair Starfighter	CF-104	Canada	fighter	1961	Retired 1988	200	(Note: modified F-104G)
Canadair Tutor	CT-114	Canada	trainer	1963	Retired 2026	190	(Note: in active service with 431 squadron as of 2014)
Canadair Yukon	CC-106	Canada	transport	1959	Retired 1971	12	
Canadian Vickers Vancouver	n/a	Canada	patrol	1929	Retired 1940	6	
Canadian Vickers Vanessa	n/a	Canada	transport	1927	Retired 1927	1	(Note: trials/evaluation only)
Canadian Vickers Varuna	n/a	Canada	patrol	1926	Retired 1930	8	
Canadian Vickers Vedette	n/a	Canada	forestry patrol	1925	Retired 1941	44	(Note: first aircraft designed for Canadian conditions)
Canadian Vickers Velos	n/a	Canada	patrol	1927	Retired 1928	1	
Canadian Vickers Vigil	n/a	Canada	trainer/transport	1928	Retired 1930	1	
Canadian Vickers Vista	n/a	Canada	patrol	1927	Retired 1931	1	
Cessna L-182	CO-119	US	transport	1961	Retired 1973	10	
Cessna L-19 Bird Dog	CO-119	US	transport	1954	Retired 1983	25	
Cessna Crane	n/a	US	trainer	1941	Retired 1949	826	
Consolidated Catalina/Canso	n/a	US/Canada	patrol	1941	Retired 1962	254	
Consolidated Courier	n/a	US	transport	1928	Retired 1941	3	
Consolidated Liberator	n/a	US	patrol	1943	Retired 1948	148	
Consolidated Privateer	n/a	US	patrol	1946	Retired 1949	1	
Curtiss Canuck	n/a	Canada	trainer	1920	Retired 1923	10	
Curtiss H-16	n/a	US	patrol	1922	Retired 1924	2	
Curtiss HS-2L	n/a	US	patrol	1920	Retired 1928	30	
Curtiss Kittyhawk	n/a	US	fighter	1941	Retired 1946	134	
Curtiss Seamew	n/a	US	transport	1943	Retired 1944	82	
Curtiss Tomahawk	n/a	US	fighter	1943	Retired 1946	4	
Curtiss Warhawk	n/a	US	fighter	1942	Retired 1943	9	
Curtiss-Reid Rambler	n/a	Canada	trainer/transport	1929	Retired 1954	9	(Note: last example used as an instructional airframe until 1954)
Dassault Falcon	CC-117	France	transport	1967	Retired 1989	8	
de Havilland Comet	n/a	UK	transport	1953	Retired 1965	2	(Note: RCAF was first military to operate jet transports)
de Havilland Dragonfly	n/a	UK	transport	1940	Retired 1945	6	
de Havilland Fox Moth	n/a	Canada	transport	1941	Retired 1945	1	
de Havilland Genet Moth	n/a	UK	trainer	1928	Retired 1932	2	
de Havilland Hawk Moth	n/a	UK	transport	1929	Retired 1935	3	
de Havilland Menasco Moth	n/a	Canada	trainer	1941	Retired 1947	136	
de Havilland Mosquito	n/a	UK	bomber/fighter-bomber	1943	Retired 1951	444	
De Havilland Moth	n/a	UK	trainer	1928	Retired 1948	89	
de Havilland Puss Moth	n/a	UK	transport	1931	Retired 1944	19	
de Havilland Sea Hornet	n/a	UK	fighter	1948	Retired 1948	1	
de Havilland DH.82C Tiger Moth	n/a	Canada	trainer	1938	Retired 1948	1,410	
de Havilland Vampire	n/a	UK	fighter	1946	Retired 1958	86	
de Havilland Canada Buffalo	CC-115	Canada	transport	1967	Retired 2022	15	
de Havilland Canada Caribou	CC-108	Canada	transport	1960	Retired 1971	9	
de Havilland Canada Chipmunk	CT-120	Canada	trainer	1948	Retired 1972	100	
de Havilland Canada Dash 7	CC-132	Canada	transport	1979	Retired 1987	2	
De Havilland Canada Dash-8	CT-142	Canada	transport/trainer	1989	4 in service	6	
de Havilland Canada Otter	CSR-123	Canada	transport	1953	Retired 1984	69	
de Havilland Canada Twin Otter	CC-138	Canada	transport	1971	4 in service	9	
Douglas Boston	n/a	US	bomber	1941	Retired 1945	3	
Douglas Dakota	CC-129	US	transport	1943	Retired 1988	169	
Douglas Digby	n/a	US	bomber	1939	Retired 1946	20	
Douglas MO-2B	n/a	US	transport/patrol	1927	Retired 1930	1	
EADS Eagle 1	CU-160	Netherlands	UAV	2003	Retired 2003	1	
Elbit Skylark	CU-168	Israel	UAV	2006	5 in service	5	
Fairchild 51 & 51A	n/a	US/Canada	transport	1930	Retired 1946	9	(Note: some converted from FC-2)
Fairchild 71, 71B & 71C	n/a	US/Canada	transport	1929	Retired 1942	23	
Fairchild Argus	n/a	US	transport	1940	Retired 1945	2	
Fairchild Cornell	n/a	US	trainer	1942	Retired 1948	1,555	
Fairchild FC-2, 2L & 2W	n/a	US/Canada	transport	1927	Retired 1938	27	
Fairchild KR-34	n/a	US	transport	1930	Retired 1936	1	
Fairchild Super 71	n/a	Canada	transport	1936	Retired 1940	2	
Fairchild Flying Boxcar	n/a	US	transport	1952	Retired 1967	35	
Fairey III.C & III.F	n/a	UK	bomber	1920	Retired 1930	2	
Fairey Albacore	n/a	UK	bomber	1943	Retired 1949	6	
Fairey Battle	n/a	UK	bomber/trainer	1939	Retired 1946	740	
Fairey Swordfish Mk.II & III	n/a	UK	bomber	1943	Retired 1947	105	
Felixstowe F.3	n/a	UK	patrol	1921	Retired 1923	11	
Fleet Fawn	n/a	Canada	trainer	1931	Retired 1947	51	
Fleet Finch	n/a	Canada	trainer	1939	Retired 1947	431	
Fleet Fort	n/a	Canada	trainer	1941	Retired 1945	101	
Fleet Freighter	n/a	Canada	transport	1942	Retired 1944	2	
Fokker Super Universal	n/a	US	transport	1929	Retired 1929	1	
Ford 6-AT Trimotor	n/a	US	transport	1929	Retired 1937	1	
General Aircraft Hotspur Mk.II	n/a	UK	trainer glider	1942	Retired 1945	22	
General Atomics Altair	CU-163	US	UAV	2004	Retired 2004	1?	
Gloster Meteor	n/a	UK	fighter	1945	Retired 1955	4	
Grob G-120A	CT-102	Germany	Trainer	2013	13 in service	14	(Note: CT-102 designation has been used by DND but has not been announced as being official)
Grumman Albatross	CSR-110	US	SAR	1960	Retired 1971	10	
Grumman Goblin	n/a	US/Canada	fighter	1940	Retired 1942	15	(Note: Canadian-built Grumman G-23.)
Grumman Goose	n/a	US	transport	1938	Retired 1956	31	
Grumman CS2F Tracker	CP-121	US/Canada	patrol	1968	Retired 1994	73	(Note: All operational Trackers built under licence by de Havilland Canada for RCN; 1 US-built S2F-1 obtained as pattern aircraft and subsequently used as stationary instructional airframe until 1972)
Handley Page Hampden	n/a	UK	bomber	1941	Retired 1944	96	
Handley Page Harrow	n/a	UK	bomber/transport	1940	Retired 1941	2	
Handley Page Halifax	n/a	UK	bomber	1944	Retired 1947	5	
Hawker Audax	n/a	UK	reconnaissance	1933	Retired 1943	6	
Hawker Hart	n/a	UK	bomber	1937	Retired 1943	3	
Hawker Hind	n/a	UK	instructional airframe	1942	Retired 1943	4	
Hawker Hurricane	n/a	UK	fighter	1939	Retired 1948	502	(Note: 451 built in Canada)
Hawker Sea Hurricane	n/a	UK	fighter	1942	Retired 1943	1	
Hawker Tempest Mk.VI	n/a	UK	fighter	1946	Retired 1947	1	
Hawker Tomtit	n/a	UK	trainer	1930	Retired 1943	2	
Hiller Nomad	CH-112	US	transport helicopter	1961	Retired 1973	27	
IAI Heron	CU-170	Israel	UAV	2008	2 in service	3	
Keystone Puffer	n/a	US	crop duster/transport	1927	Retired 1934	2	
Lockheed Arcturus	CP-140A	US	trainer/patrol	1992	Retired 2011	3	
Lockheed Aurora	CP-140	US	patrol	1980	14 in service	18	
Lockheed Electra	n/a	US	transport	1939	Retired 1946	15	
Lockheed Electra Junior	n/a	US	transport	1940	Retired 1945	10	
Lockheed Hercules	CC-130	US	transport	1960	12 in service	44	
Lockheed Martin CC-130J Hercules	CC-130J	US	transport	2010	17 in service	17	
Lockheed Hudson	n/a	US	bomber	1939	Retired 1948	247	
Lockheed Lodestar	n/a	US	transport	1943	Retired 1948	18	
Lockheed Model 212	n/a	US	transport	1940	Retired 1946	1	
Lockheed Neptune	CP-122	US	patrol	1955	Retired 1970	25	
Lockheed Shooting Star	n/a	US	trainer	1951	Retired 1955	31	(Note: Built in Canada as the Canadair Silver Star.)
Lockheed Starfighter	CF-104	US	fighter	1962	Retired 1986	39	
Lockheed Starlifter	CC-141	US	transport	n/a	n/a	0	Cancelled
Lockheed Ventura	n/a	US	patrol/trainer	1942	Retired 1947	286	
Martin Baltimore	n/a	US	bomber	1942	Retired 1942	1	
Martinsyde F6	n/a	UK	fighter	1922	Retired 1925	1	
MBB/Kawasaki BK 117	CH-143	Germany	transport helicopter	1989	Retired 1990	1	(Note: Used for testing the Helicopter Integrated Navigation System (HINS) intended for the cancelled New Shipborne Aircraft program (NSA) that was initially intended to replace the Sea King.)
McDonnell Douglas CF-18 Hornet	CF-188	US	fighter	1982	80 in service	138	
McDonnell Voodoo	CF-101	US	fighter	1963	Retired 1987	132	
Mil Mi-8	CH-8	Russia	transport helicopter	2008	Retired 2011	6	
Mil Mi-17-V5	CH-178	Russia	transport helicopter	2008	Retired 2011	4	
Meggitt Vindicator II	CU-162	Canada	UAV (Target)	?	2000s?	1	
Noorduyn Norseman	n/a	Canada	transport	1940	Retired 1957	100	
North American AT-6D Texan	n/a	US	trainer	1951	Retired 1954	100	
North American Harvard	n/a	US/Canada	trainer	1939	Retired 1968	2,156	
North American Mitchell	n/a	US	bomber	1942	Retired 1963	164	
North American Mustang Mk.IV	n/a	US	fighter	1947	Retired 1961	130	
North American NA-26	n/a	US	trainer	1940	Retired 1942	1	
North American NA-44	n/a	US	fighter/trainer	1940	Retired 1944	1	(Note: two seat attack variant of Harvard with larger engine.)
North American Sabre	n/a	US	fighter	1951	Retired 1953	1	(Note: Pattern aircraft for Canadair Sabre production.)
North American Yale	n/a	US	trainer	1940	Retired 1946	119	
Northrop Delta	n/a	Canada	transport/patrol	1936	Retired 1945	20	(Note: first all metal aircraft built in Canada.)
Northrop Nomad	n/a	US	bomber, trainer	1940	Retired 1945	32	
Percival Prentice	n/a	UK	trainer, testing	1948	Retired 1948	1	
Piasecki H-21A	CH-125	US	transport/SAR helicopter	1954	Retired 1973	15	
Piasecki Model 44A	CH-127	US	transport/SAR helicopter	1960	Retired 1972	5	
Pilatus PC-21 Siskin II	CT-157	Switzerland	trainer	2026	0	19	
Pitcairn Mailwing	n/a	US	transport	1928	Retired 1932	1	
Prioria Robotics Maveric	n/a	US	UAV	n/a	Retired 20??	5	
Radioplane OQ-19	n/a	US	UAV, gunnery target drone	n/a	Retired	10	
Royal Aircraft Factory S.E.5a	n/a	UK	fighter, advanced pilot trainer	1920	Retired 1929	12	
Ryan Firebee	n/a	USA	UAV, target drone	1957	Retired	30	
SAGEM Sperwer	CU-161	France	target acquisition and surveillance UAV	2003	Retired 2010	31	
Schweizer 2-12	n/a	US	trainer glider	1946	Retired 1949	2	
Sikorsky Cyclone	CH-148	US	ASW, utility helicopter	2015	17 in service	28	
Sikorsky H-5 Dragonfly	n/a	US	utility transport, SAR helicopter	1947	Retired 1965	7	
Sikorsky H-19	n/a	US	utility transport helicopter	1954	Retired 1966	15+5	(Note: Includes 15 R-1340 powered H-19 aircraft built for RCAF and 5 operational R-1300 powered HO4S-3 aircraft built for RCN; 8 other RCN HO4S-2/3 aircraft lost in accidents or placed in storage prior to unification)
Sikorsky H-34A	CH-126	US	utility transport helicopter	1955	Retired 1971	6	
Sikorsky Sea King	CH-124	US	ASW helicopter	1968	Retired 2018	41	(Note: ex-Royal Canadian Navy CHSS-2.)
Slingsby Firefly	CT-111	UK	trainer	1995	Retired 2006	12	(Note: Leased aircraft, designation may not be official.)
Sopwith Camel	n/a	UK	fighter, trainer	1924	Retired 1929	10	
Sopwith Snipe	n/a	UK	fighter	1919	Retired 1923	3	
Stearman 75 Kaydet	n/a	US	trainer	1942	Retired 1943	301	
Stinson 105 Voyager	n/a	US	utility transport	1940	Retired 1946	25	
Supermarine Spitfire	n/a	UK	fighter	1940	Retired 1950	8	
Supermarine Stranraer	n/a	UK	patrol seaplane	1938	Retired 1946	40	(Note: built in Canada under licence.)
Supermarine Walrus	n/a	UK	reconnaissance, transport amphibian	1943	Retired 1947	8	
UMS CU-176 Gargoyle	CU-176	Canada	surveillance	2020	n/a	n/a	
Vertol Labrador & Voyageur	CH-113	US	SAR, transport helicopter	1963	Retired 2001	18	
Vickers Viking Mk.IV	n/a	UK	aerial surveying, transport, patrol amphibian	1923	Retired 1931	8	
Waco AQC-6 Custom	n/a	US	passenger transport	1942	Retired 1942	1	
Waco CG-15A	n/a	US	transport glider	1946	Retired 1950	1	
Waco Hadrian Mk.II	n/a	US	transport glider	1944	Retired 1955	32	
Waco PG-2A	n/a	US	powered glider, transport	1946	Retired 1947	1	(Note: powered Waco Hadrian glider.)
Westland Lysander	n/a	UK/Canada	reconnaissance, utility transport, trainer	1939	Retired 1946	329	
Westland Wapiti	n/a	UK	utility, reconnaissance	1930	Retired 1944	25	

== See also ==
- List of active Canadian military aircraft
- List of aircraft of the Royal Canadian Navy
