= List of active Canadian military aircraft =

This list identifies the military aircraft which are currently being operated by the Royal Canadian Air Force. List of aircraft of Canada's air forces includes all aircraft operated by the RCAF and its predecessors, current and past, while List of aircraft of the Royal Canadian Navy covers all RCN aircraft.

== Current aircraft ==
An internal National Defence military readiness report noted that about 40 percent of aircraft in the current inventory could be considered "serviceable" as of early 2025. A 2025 report by the Auditor General of Canada found that one of the RCAF's biggest obstacles was a shortage of both trained fighter pilots and aircraft maintenance technicians.

Aircraft	Origin	Type	Variant	In service	Notes
Combat aircraft
CF-18 Hornet (CF-188)	United States	Multirole	CF-18A/B Hornet HEP II	85	98 CF-18A and 40 CF-18B have been delivered for a total of 138. 72 CF-18As and 31 CF-18Bs in inventory, 85 in operational use.
F/A-18A/B Hornet	United States	Multirole	FA-18A/B Hornet HUG 3.2	10	12 F/A-18A and 6 F/A-18B have been delivered from Australia
F-35 Lightning II	United States	Multirole	CF-35A	2/88	88 on order. First flight 23 September 2026. Two delivered.
Maritime patrol
CP-140 Aurora	United States	ASW/Patrol	Lockheed CP-140M	14	Will be replaced by up to 16 Boeing P-8A
CP-8A Poseidon	United States	ASW/Patrol	CP-8A Poseidon	0	14 on order, plus 2 options
Reconnaissance
CE-145C Vigilance	United States	surveillance/reconnaissance	Beechcraft King Air 350ER	3	
Transport aircraft
CC-130J Super Hercules	United States	Tactical airlifter/SAR	Lockheed Martin C-130J-30	17	
CC-138 Twin Otter	Canada	Search and Rescue (SAR)	DHC-6 Series 300	4	
CC-144 Challenger	Canada	Transport	Bombardier Challenger 604, Bombardier Challenger 650	4	2 Challenger 604, 2 Challenger 650
CC-150 Polaris	Multinational	Transport/Tanker	Airbus CC-150, Airbus CC-150T	3	2 tanker and 1 VIP
CC-330 Husky	Multinational	Transport/Tanker	A330-200	3	9 new and used aircraft to be converted to MRTT role. First aircraft arrived in Canada on 31 August 2023.
CC-295 Kingfisher	Spain	Search and Rescue (SAR)	Airbus CC-295	8	Sixteen aircraft ordered to replace CC-115 Buffalo and CC-130 Hercules in the SAR role.
CC-177 Globemaster III	United States	Strategic airlifter	Boeing C-17A ER	5	
Helicopters
CH-139 JetRanger	United States	Trainer	Bell 206B-3	13	13 Airbus Helicopters H135 ordered as replacement.
CH-146 Griffon	United States / Canada	Trainer/Transport/SAR	CH-146C Mk II Griffon	81	85 tactical helicopters and 15 SAR. Eight armed in 2009 to escort CH-147 Chinooks in Afghanistan.
CH-147F Chinook	United States	Transport	Boeing CH-47F	14	
CH-148 Cyclone	United States	ASW		27	28 helicopters delivered, 1 crashed into the Ionian Sea off the coast of Greece on April 29, 2020 while operating from the frigate HMCS Fredericton.
CH-149 Cormorant	United Kingdom / Italy	SAR		13	13 aircraft to be upgraded plus additional 3 new-build helicopters ordered
Trainer aircraft
CT-142 Dash-8	Canada	Trainer	DHC-8-102	4	3 Dash 8-400 Ordered
CT-145/C-90B King Air	United States	Trainer	C90B	7	7 Beechcraft King Air 260 ordered as replacement.
CT-156 Harvard II	United States	Trainer		22	24 leased in 2000, 2 added in 2002. Two lost in crashes.
Dassault/Dornier Alpha Jet	France / Germany	Jet Trainer	Dassault/Dornier Alpha Jet Type A	16	Based in Montreal and operated by Canadian Air Combat and Electronic Warfare Support Services as well as 414 Squadron.
Grob G 120	Germany	Trainer	G120A	14	23 G120 TP Ordered
UAV
IAI Heron	Israel	ISR		2	2 in service, formerly operated 3.
UMS Skeldar V-200	Sweden	ISR	CU-176 Gargoyle	6	Known as CU-176 Gargoyle in Canadian Service.
RQ-21 Blackjack	United States	ISR		10	

Airbus CC-150 Polaris

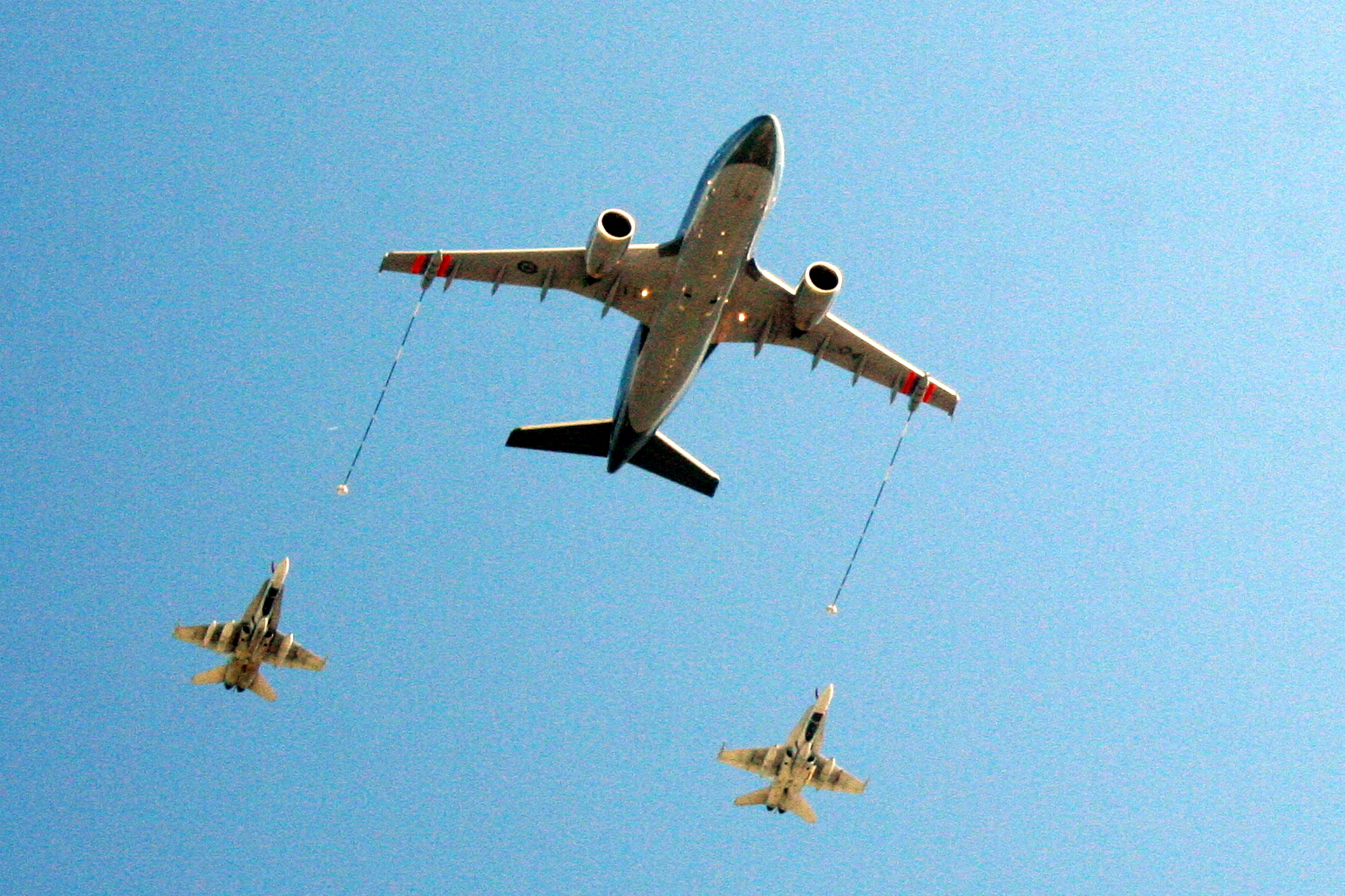
An RCAF CC-150 Polaris refuelling two CF-18 Hornets near CFB Borden

Airbus A310 transports purchased in 1992 for use as strategic transports and air-to-air tankers to replace the Boeing CC-137. Two have been converted to tankers and are designated the CC-150T. One is permanently configured for VIP transport; all four aircraft are operated by 437 Squadron based at 8 Wing Trenton, Ontario.
Airbus CC-295 Kingfisher
Twin-turboprop tactical search and rescue aircraft as replacement for the CC-115 Buffalo and older-model C-130H Hercules search and rescue aircraft
BAE Systems CT-155 Hawk
17 single-engined lead-in fighter trainer leased in 2000. Taken out of service as flight trainers in April 2024, finding new life at the Canadian Forces School of Aerospace Technology and Engineering, where 15 aircraft serve as new maintenance trainers for aircraft technicians-in-training.
Beechcraft CT-156 Harvard II
Single-engined trainer leased from CAE Inc. to replace the Canadair CT-114 Tutor. 24 aircraft based at 15 Wing Moose Jaw, Saskatchewan
Beechcraft King Air C-90B
Multi-engine training aircraft. Leased to RCAF by Allied Wings, 7 aircraft are based at Portage la Prairie, Manitoba.
Boeing CC-177 Globemaster III

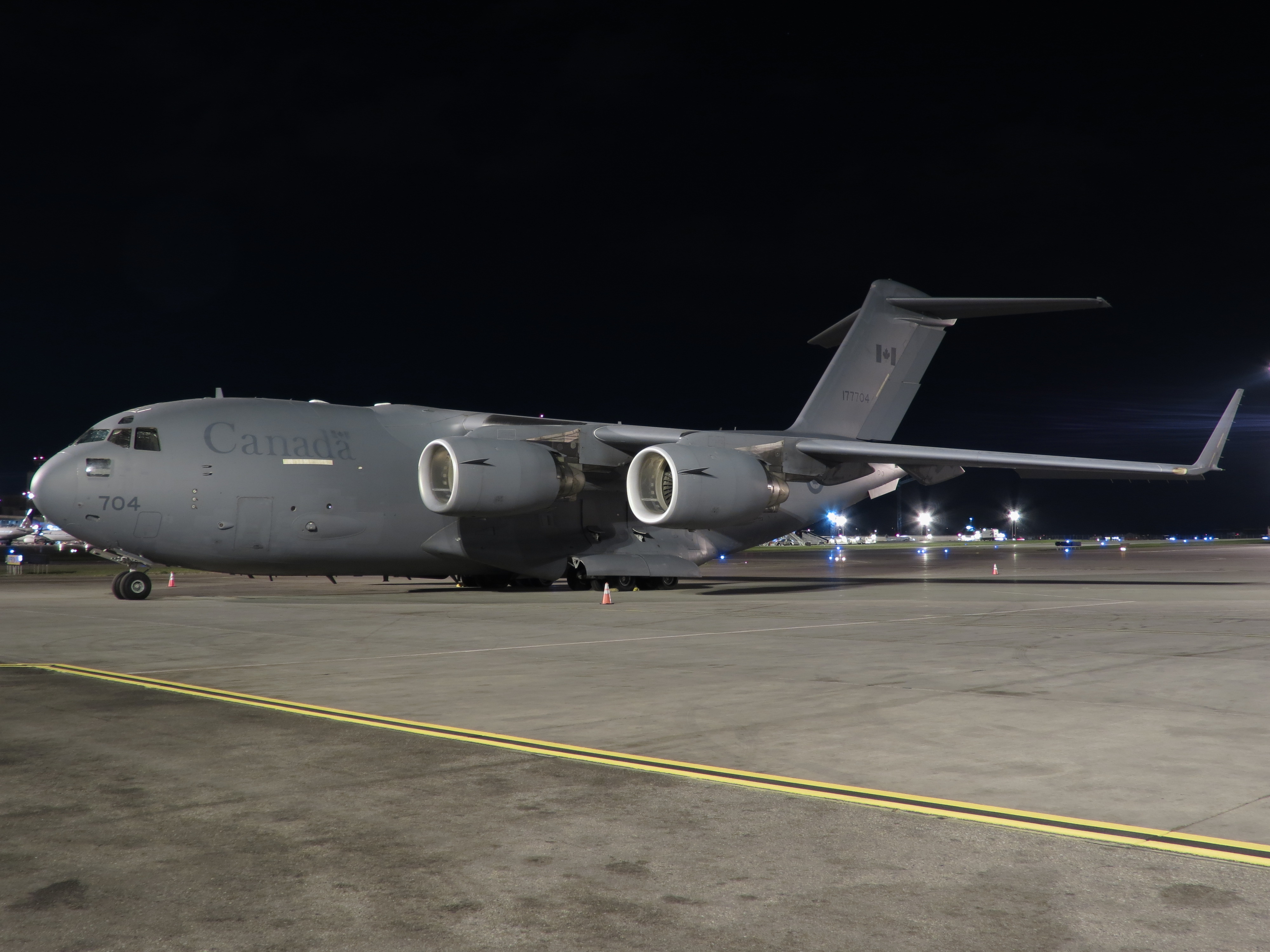
An RCAF C-17 Globemaster III at Calgary International Airport

Five strategic airlifters operated by 429 (T) Squadron based at 8 Wing Trenton, Ontario. Four were delivered from 2007 to 2008, a fifth was delivered in 2015.
Bombardier CC-144 Challenger
Utility and VIP transport aircraft first delivered in 1982. Early Challenger 600 and 601 models were supplemented by 604 models in 2002. Four aircraft are operated by 412(T) Sqn and based in Ottawa, but belong to 8 Wing Trenton.
Canadair CT-114 Tutor
Entered service in 1962 as a basic and advanced jet trainer with 190 originally ordered, replaced by the CT-156 Harvard II and CT-155 Hawk in 2000. A total of 26 aircraft remain in service, 24 of which are used by 431 Air Demonstration Squadron, "The Snowbirds". Five are used by Aerospace Engineering Test Establishment (AETE) for test support and pilot proficiency flying.
DHC CC-138 Twin Otter
A twin-engined utility transport operated since the 1970s, four remain based at Yellowknife, Northwest Territories, operated by 440 Transport Squadron.
DHC CT-142 Dash 8
Twin-engined converted regional airliner entered service in 1987 as an aerial navigation and tactics trainer, Four are operated by 402 "City of Winnipeg" Sqn and stationed at 17 Wing, Winnipeg, Manitoba.
Grob G 120A
Single engine primary trainer used to train pilot candidates before they move onto the Harvard II. Leased to RCAF by KF Defence Programs, 14 aircraft are based at 3 Canadian Forces Flying Training School in Portage la Prairie, Manitoba.
Lockheed CP-140 Aurora
Four-engined maritime patrol aircraft based on the American Lockheed P-3 Orion; entered service in 1980, 18 aircraft now based at 19 Wing Comox, British Columbia, and 14 Wing Greenwood, Nova Scotia.
Lockheed Martin CC-130J Super Hercules
Four-engined tactical airlifter replacing earlier Hercules variants in that role. A total of 17 are in service operated by 436 (T) Squadron based at 8 Wing Trenton.
McDonnell Douglas CF-18 Hornet

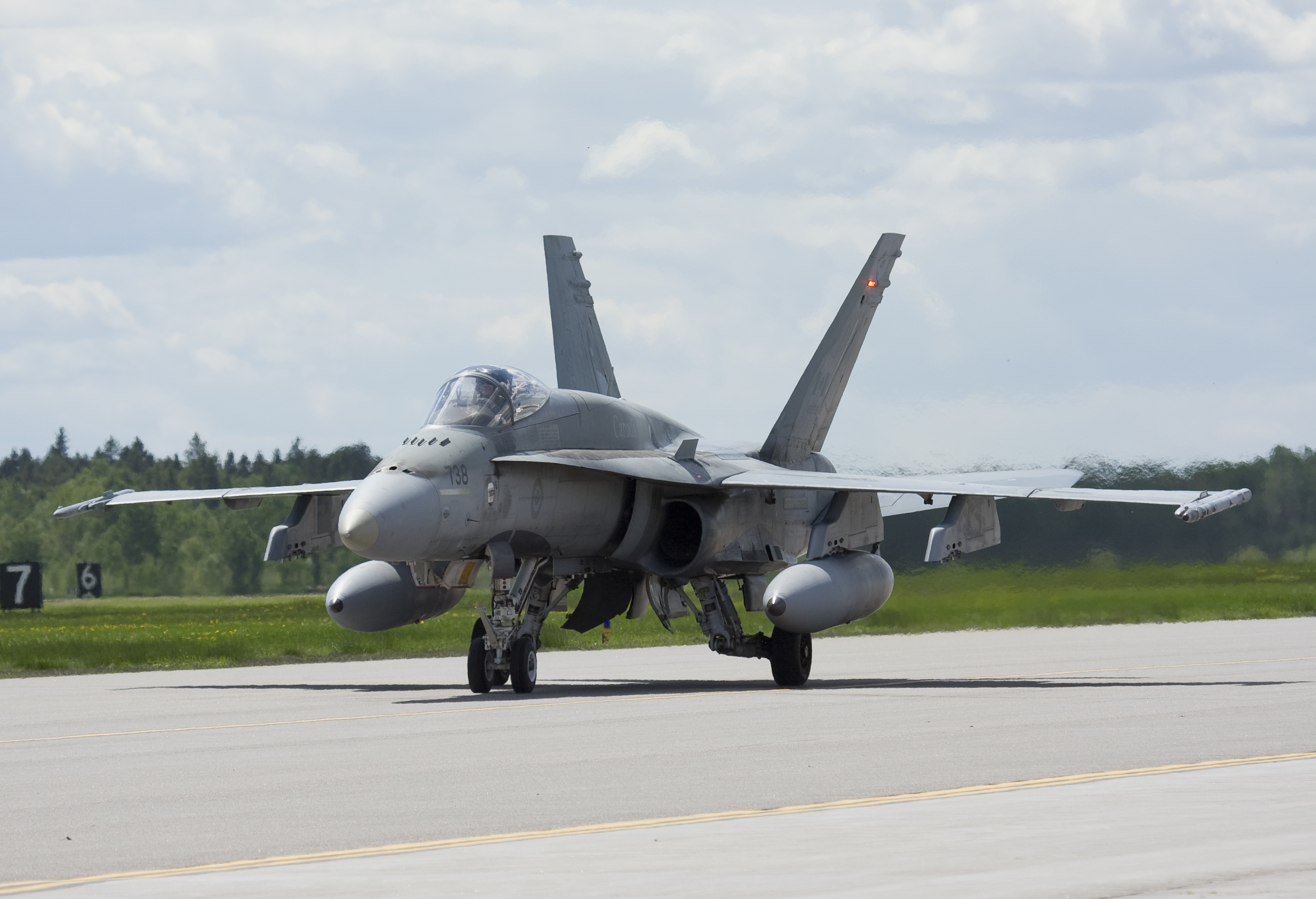
An RCAF CF-18 Hornet during the Bagotville Air Show

Fighter entered service in 1982 when 98 single-seat CF-18As and 40 two-seat CF-18Bs were ordered. Seventeen have been lost since 1984. Stationed at 3 Wing Bagotville, Quebec and 4 Wing Cold Lake, Alberta; 60 CF-18As and 25 CF-18Bs remain in active service.
McDonnell Douglas F/A-18 Hornet (Ex-RAAF)
18 (12 F/A-18A and 6 F/A-18B) have been delivered. Up to seven additional Hornets are also being supplied to be used for spares.

=== Rotary Wing ===
AgustaWestland CH-149 Cormorant
Triple-engined search and rescue helicopter that replaced the CH-113 Labrador. Fifteen delivered between 2000 and 2002. Based at (103 Squadron) 9 Wing Gander, Newfoundland; (413 Squadron) 14 Wing Greenwood, Nova Scotia; and (442 Squadron) 19 Wing Comox, British Columbia. Two lost, one aircraft has been lost in a training accident.
Bell CH-139 JetRanger (Model C or III)
Single-engined utility and training helicopter. Ordered for 3 Canadian Forces Flying Training School at CFB Portage la Prairie, MB; an older variant (CH-136 - Jetranger A model), was used by Regular Forces in CFB Lahr in Germany and in Canada from 1972 - 1995 which were replaced by CH-146 Griffons. 12 aircraft remain, leased from Allied Wings, used for flight training in Portage la Prairie, Manitoba.
Bell CH-146 Griffon

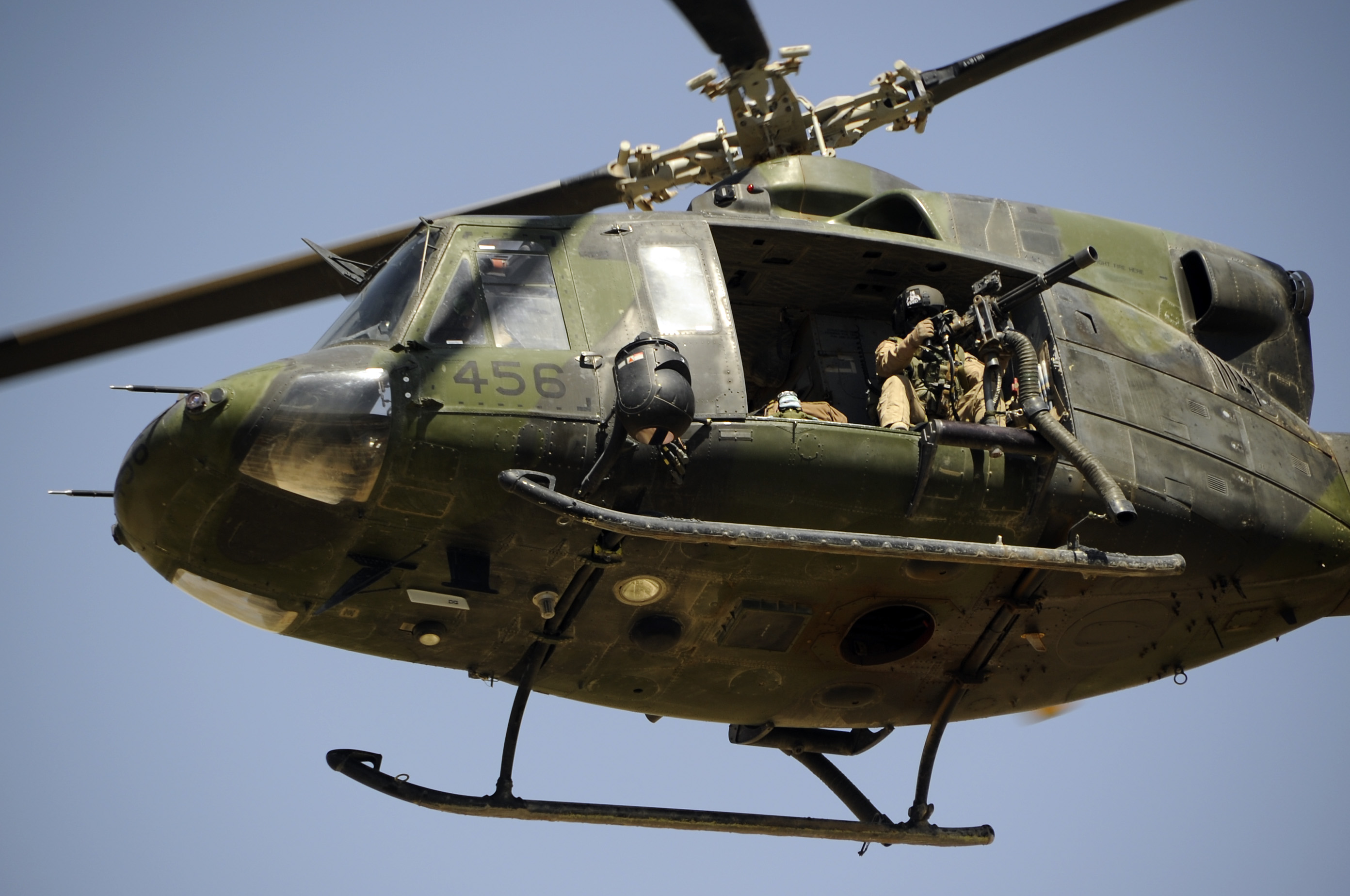
An RCAF CH-146 Griffon providing close air support for units of the Afghan Armed Forces, and ISAF

A utility transport tactical helicopter (UTTH) that entered service between 1995 and 1997. Original purchase of 100 aircraft to replace the CH-136 Kiowa (Bell 206), CH-135 Twin Huey (Bell 212), CH-118 Iroquois (Bell 205), and Boeing C-Model Chinooks CH-47C. Based at Bagotville, Quebec (439 Squadron), St. Hubert, Quebec (438 Squadron), Cold Lake, Alberta (417 Squadron), Gagetown, New Brunswick (403 Squadron), Valcartier, Quebec (430 Squadron), Goose Bay, Newfoundland (444 Squadron), Edmonton, Alberta (408 Squadron), and Borden, Ontario (400 Squadron); also perform search and rescue duties at 8 Wing Trenton (424 Squadron). Deployed to Afghanistan to provide escorts for the Chinooks, armed with a combination of 7.62mm C-6 machine gun, 7.62mm Dillon Aero M134D Gatling gun, and GAU-21 .50 caliber machine gun on one or both doors. 9 ex-RCAF Griffons, designated CT-146, are leased from Allied Wings for pilot training at Portage la Prairie, Manitoba. CT-146 Griffons are painted all black and have RCAF roundel, RCAF wordmark, Canada wordmark and civilian registration numbers.
Boeing CH-147F Chinook
The CH-147F Chinook is an advanced, multi-mission, medium to heavy-lift helicopter. Its primary mission is the tactical transport of equipment and personnel during domestic or deployed operations. 450 Tactical Helicopter Squadron, under the command of 1 Wing Kingston, Ontario, and based in CFB Petawawa, Ontario, was re-established as the home of Canadaʼs fleet of 15 CH-147F Chinooks. The first two airframes underwent intensive operational test and evaluation in the United States for several months before Canada received the first airframe 147303 at an official acceptance ceremony at the Ottawa International Airport on 27 June 2013. Fifteen aircraft were initially acquired, but one crashed in 2023. Full operational capability by June 2018. The Auditor General criticized National Defence for "underestimated and understated" the complexity of the purchases of the Chinook, "[t]he way the advance contract notification instrument was applied in the directed procurement of the Chinook helicopters did not comply with the letter or intent of the applicable regulations and policies".
Sikorsky CH-148 Cyclone

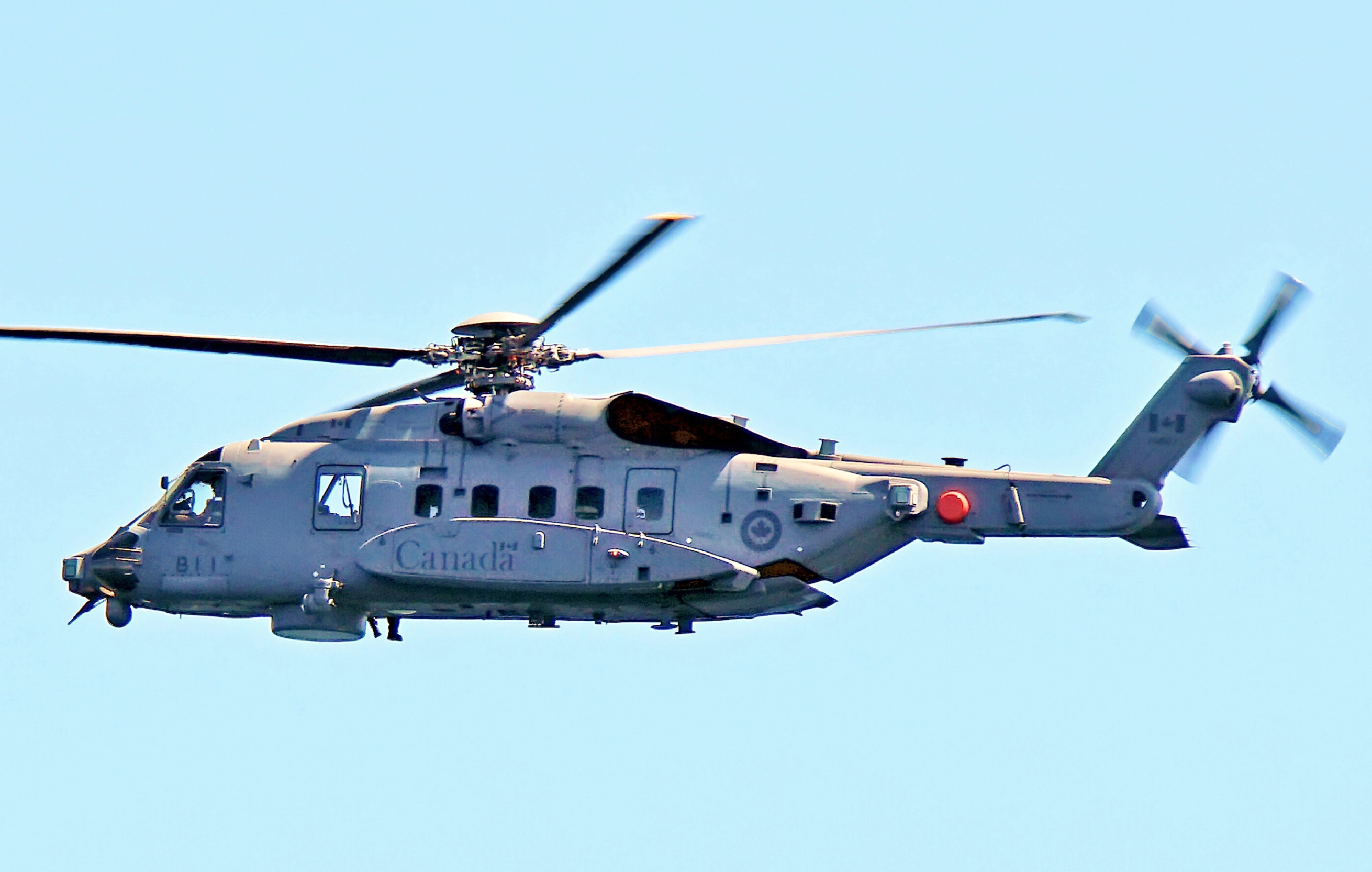
A CH-148 Cyclone in flight

Ship-based transport/anti-submarine helicopter based on the Sikorsky H-92 Superhawk. Twenty-eight ordered to replace the Sea King from 2009. Delays pushed first delivery to 2015. One aircraft was lost in an accident in April 2020.

=== Leased and contractor aircraft ===
The Canadian Forces have leased aircraft from vendors to help transport troops and equipment from Canada and other locations in the past decade. Transport aircraft have been leased as required. Despite RCAF marking all aircraft have civilian registration numbers.

Dornier Alpha Jet Type A
16 aircraft are operated by Top Aces for CATS (Contracted Airborne Training Services) and are based at CFB Cold Lake and CFB Bagotville.

=== Unmanned Aerial Systems (UAS) ===
==== RCAF UAS ====
SAGEM Sperwer
Designated CU-161; entered service in 2003, retired
IAI Heron
3 leased in 2009 for use in Afghanistan; turned over to the Royal Australian Air Force in 2011

==== Canadian Army/RCN UAS ====
BAE Systems Silver Fox
Acquired in 2004 by the Canadian Forces Experimentation Centre
Boeing Insitu ScanEagle
Designated CU-165; operated by the Canadian Army 2008–2014
Elbit Skylark
Designated CU-168; operated by the Canadian Army
AeroVironment RQ-11 Raven
Operated by the Canadian Army
AeroVironment RQ-20 Puma
Acquired in 2018; operated by the Royal Canadian Navy
Prioria Robotics Maveric
Operated by the Canadian Army
Saab Skeldar
Acquired in 2019; operated by the Royal Canadian Navy and CANSOFCOM
Boeing Insitu RQ-21 Blackjack
Designated CU-172; 5 acquired in 2016, operated by the Canadian Army

== Future procurement ==
Aircraft	Origin	Type	Variant	Number on order	Notes
Combat aircraft
F-35A Lightning II	United States	Multirole	F-35A block 4	88	Ordered in January 2023. First 4 to arrive in 2026, with all 88 to be delivered by 2032.
Maritime patrol
Boeing P-8A	United States	ASW/Patrol	Boeing P-8A	14	Plus 2 options, with delivery starting in 2026.
Transport aircraft
CC-295 Kingfisher	Spain	SAR	EADS CASA C-295	16	All 16 aircraft were expected to be delivered by the end of 2022. However, initial operating capability is not anticipated until 2025/26. Additional trainer aircraft for maintenance personnel arrived in 2020 without SAR equipment and not part of the operational fleet.
Bombardier Global Express	Canada	Transport	Global 6500	6	Plus 4 options, replacing and augmenting Challenger 604 and 650 models, starting in 2027.
Trainer aircraft
CT-145E Expeditor II	United States	Trainer	Beechcraft Super King Air 260	7	To operate as part of Canada's Future Aircrew Training (FAcT) Program.
CT-153 Juno	France	Trainer	Airbus H135	19	To operate as part of Canada's Future Aircrew Training (FAcT) Program.
CT-142Q Citadel	Canada	Trainer	De Havilland Canada Dash 8-400	3	To operate as part of Canada's Future Aircrew Training (FAcT) Program.
CT-102B Astra II	Germany	Trainer	G 120 TP	23	To operate as part of Canada's Future Aircrew Training (FAcT) Program.
CT-157 Siskin II	Switzerland	Trainer	Pilatus PC-21	19	To operate as part of Canada's Future Aircrew Training (FAcT) Program.
UAV
MQ-9B SkyGuardian	United States	ISR		11	Delivery from 2028.

=== Lockheed Martin F-35 Lightning II ===
The Canadian CF-35 is a proposed variant that would differ from the F-35A through the addition of a drogue parachute and may include an F-35B/C-style refuelling probe. In 2012, it was revealed that the CF-35 would employ the same boom refuelling system as the F-35A. Following the 2015 Federal Election the Liberal Party, whose campaign had included a pledge to cancel the F-35 procurement, formed a new government and commenced an open competition to replace the existing CF-18 Hornet. On 28 March 2022, the Government of Canada announced that the competition had placed the F-35A first and planned to buy 88 of them. Under procurement rules, the government entered into negotiations with Lockheed Martin. On 9 January 2023, the government of Canada officially ordered 88 F-35As. Of the 88 planned F-35As, only 16 have been purchased. Due to US President Donald Trump economic threats towards Canada, the Canadian government has been looking to instead buy the Saab JAS 39 Gripen. This has led to further tariff threats from the Trump administration and the US Ambassador to Canada, Pete Hoekstra, threatening the stability of NORAD.

=== General Atomics MQ-9B SkyGuardian ===
On 19 December 2023 the Government of Canada announced that a contract was signed for 11 MQ-9B drones, 219 Hellfire missiles, and 12 Mk82 500-pound bombs in a deal worth $2.49 billion CAD. The drones are expected to be first delivered in 2028 with full operation expected in 2033. The drones are to be stationed in 14 Wing Greenwood, N.S. with 55 personnel and with 25 personnel at 19 Wing Comox, B.C. and in Ottawa with 160 staff to control the drones. Personnel will also forward deploy to northern Canada as needed.

=== Boeing P-8A Poseidon ===
November 30, 2023 - Canada finalized a government-to-government agreement with the US government for the acquisition of up to 16 P-8A Poseidon aircraft for the RCAF. Fourteen multi-mission aircraft will be procured, with options for up to two additional.

=== Airbus CC-330 Husky (A330-200) MRTT ===
In 2022, two ex-Kuwait Airways Airbus A330-200 were selected to be converted as Airbus A330 MRTT to replace the CC-150 Polaris. The two aircraft will arrive in winter 2023 and converted by Airbus Defence and Space (mainly in Spain and repainted in France). On June 19, 2023 a contract was awarded for the acquisition of nine CC-330 Husky aircraft (mix of 4 new and 5 used A330-200), associated equipment, integrated logistic support elements, training simulator(s), and sustainment.

=== Bombardier Global 6500 ===
In December 2025, the Government announced the purchase of 6 Bombardier Global 6500 to replace the C-144 Challenger fleet, with the first aircraft delivered in summer 2027.

== See also ==
- List of aircraft of Canada's air forces
- Future Canadian Forces projects
- Equipment of the Canadian Coast Guard (aircraft)
