= MRTT =

MRTT is an official four-letter acronym, the short meaning of Multi-Role Tanker Transport — a multiple-use military aerial refuelling tanker, passenger transport, and air cargo fixed-wing aircraft, also capable as full aeromedical option. Constructed in Europe by Airbus, it was manufactured in two distinct airframe versions, both conversions of existing civilian passenger airliners:

- Airbus A310 MRTT, based on the Airbus A310 airliner
- Airbus A330 MRTT, based on the Airbus A330 airliner
