= Airbus CC-150 Polaris =

Canadian military transport aircraft

CC-150 Polaris
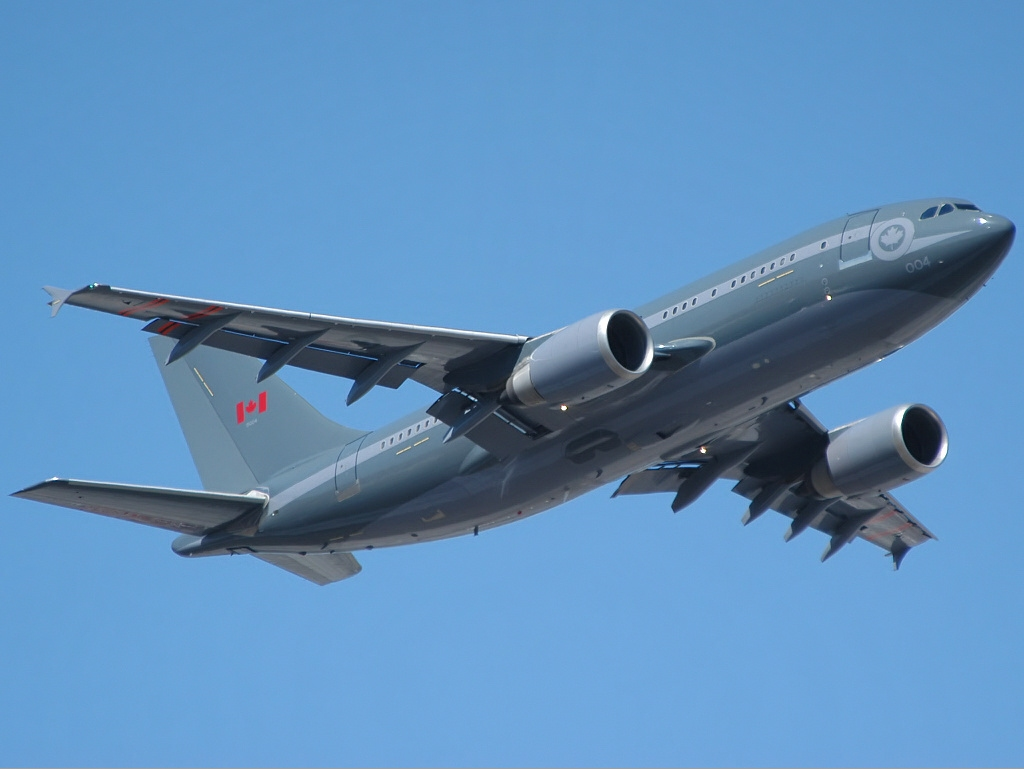
- Royal Canadian Air Force Polaris 15004 taking off from Ottawa Airport (2006)

General information
- Type: Strategic transport/VIP transport/tanker
- Manufacturer: Airbus
- Status: Active service (Being Retired)
- Primary users: Canadian Forces Royal Canadian Air Force
- Number built: 5 (all converted from Airbus A310-300)

History
- Introduction date: 1992
- Retired: 2023 (CC150T 15003), 2025 (CC150 15001)
- Developed from: Airbus A310 MRTT
- Successors: Airbus CC-330 Husky

The Airbus CC-150 Polaris is the designation for the civilian Airbus A310-300s which have been converted into multi-purpose, long-range jet aircraft for passenger, freight or medical transport and mid-air refueling for the Royal Canadian Air Force (RCAF).

== Design and development ==
The three Airbus aircraft that make up the fleet were originally civilian airliners purchased and operated by Wardair. First delivered in 1987 and 1988, they were transferred to Canadian Airlines when the two airlines merged in 1989. The aircraft were subsequently sold to the Canadian Armed Forces and converted for military use, entering service between December 1992 and August 1993. Four of the five aircraft, numbered 15002 to 15005, were converted to the Combi-Freighter standard with a reinforced floor and side opening cargo door. The fifth, 15001, was modified as a VIP transport aircraft for government executive transport.

The CC-150 replaced the Boeing CC-137 (converted Boeing 707) as a strategic transport when the final transport-configured CC-137s were retired in 1997.

=== Tanker conversion ===
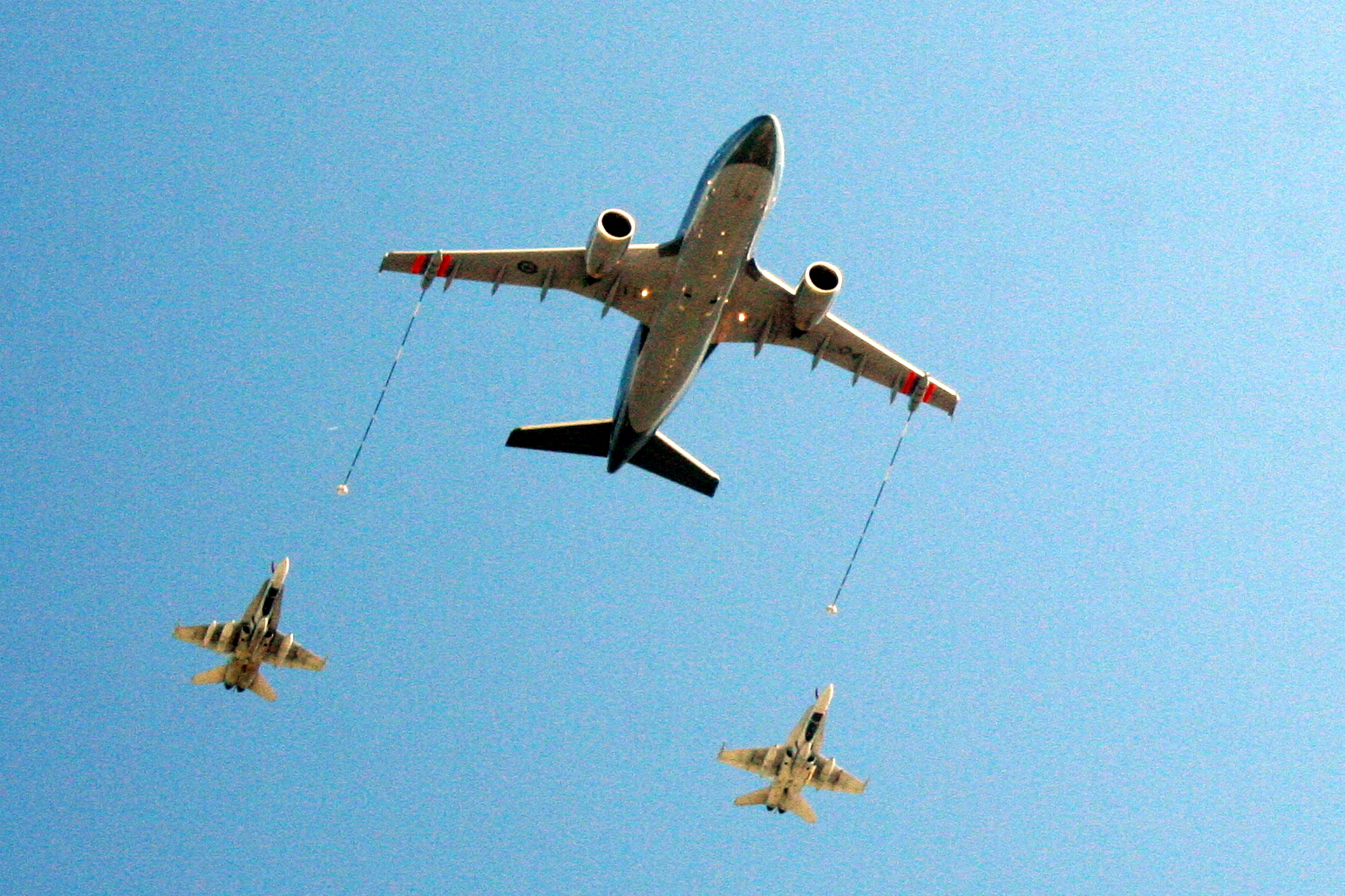
CC-150 Polaris 15004 refuelling two CF-18 Hornets (2009)

In 2008, two of the five CC-150s were converted to air-to-air refuelling tankers with a new military mission avionics package for the CF-18 fleet as part of the Multi Role Tanker Transport (MRTT) program. The Polaris tankers are capable of ferrying a flight of four CF-18 Hornets non-stop across the Atlantic Ocean, off-loading 80,000 pounds of fuel to the receiving aircraft over a 2,500 nautical mile (4,630 km) leg. The MRTT program was initiated because of a German Air Force requirement and provided a cost-effective solution for the Canadian Forces. The converted aircraft have been designated CC-150T. The tankers have hose-drogue pods under the wings.

The RCAF uses converted C-130s, RCAF designation CC-130H(T), for tactical air-to-air refuelling but is limited when deploying CF-18s overseas, as they are better served by a strategic air-to-air refuelling platform. As a result of the CC-150's MRTT conversion, Canada regained its strategic air-to-air refuelling capability, lost when the final tanker-configured CC-137s were retired in 1997 (13703 & 13704 were modified with Beech refuelling kits in mid-1972 in support of the CF-5 tactical fighter).

The first converted CC-150T completed its acceptance trials in May 2008.

== Operational history ==
The Polaris is classified as a strategic airlifter by the Royal Canadian Air Force. As a tanker, the CC-150 has a similar fuel capacity to the KC-135; it is more flexible because of the large cabin, offering good capacity for cargo, troop transport, VIP transport or other uses, but lacks the oversize cargo capacity and ability to operate from austere locations. The Canadian Armed Forces rely on other heavy lift cargo aircraft (such as the C-17 Globemaster) for these kinds of operations.

The five CC-150s are operated by 437 Transport Squadron at CFB Trenton, Ontario. They served in United Nations, Red Cross and NATO initiatives, including operations in Afghanistan.

In 2011, two CC-150T air-to-air refuelling tankers were deployed to support Canadian CF-18 fighter jets enforcing the no-fly zone over Libya under Operation Mobile and Operation Unified Protector.

The initial purchase from Canadian Airlines in 1992 included a support contract for service of the aircraft for a fixed number of flying hours. Air Canada acquired the CC-150 service contract when it purchased Canadian Airlines in 2000, and through a series of subsequent corporate restructurings, spawned the CC-150 service contract to Air Canada Technical Services (ACTS), then Aveos Fleet Performance. Following the collapse of Aveos Fleet Performance in March 2012, the Government of Canada awarded a one-year interim contract to L3 Communications to support the fleet of CC-150 aircraft until Canada could award a longer term aircraft maintenance contract through a competitive procurement process.

On July 22, 2023, the CC-150 15003 suffered severe damage to its tail in a rollaway collision with a French Air Force Airbus A400M parked nearby. In November 2023, the Royal Canadian Air Force made the decision to scrap the aircraft in Guam, where it has been parked since the accident occurred. Repair costs were estimated between $7.9 and $28.5 million.

=== Use as VIP transport ===
The call sign of the VIP-configured CC-150 is known officially as CAN Force One. The decision to outfit one of the five CC-150s as a VIP transport intended for use by the Prime Minister of Canada, made while Brian Mulroney held office, was politically controversial. The $56 million in upgrades ($3 million of that went towards a private compartment with a dining room, entertainment area, fold-out beds and a shower) were criticized as a needless extravagance during a time of government budgetary challenges by then-Leader of the Opposition Jean Chrétien, who labelled the aircraft a "flying Taj Mahal". Chrétien became Prime Minister soon thereafter and tried and failed to sell the aircraft; he refused to use the CC-150 during his ensuing 11 years in office. The interior was downgraded to a smaller, less lavish VIP cabin and the aircraft offered limited communications capability.

Subsequent refits to and from use as a troop transport resulted in much of the VIP amenities being downgraded. The CC-150 returned to use as official transport for the prime minister under Paul Martin in 2004.

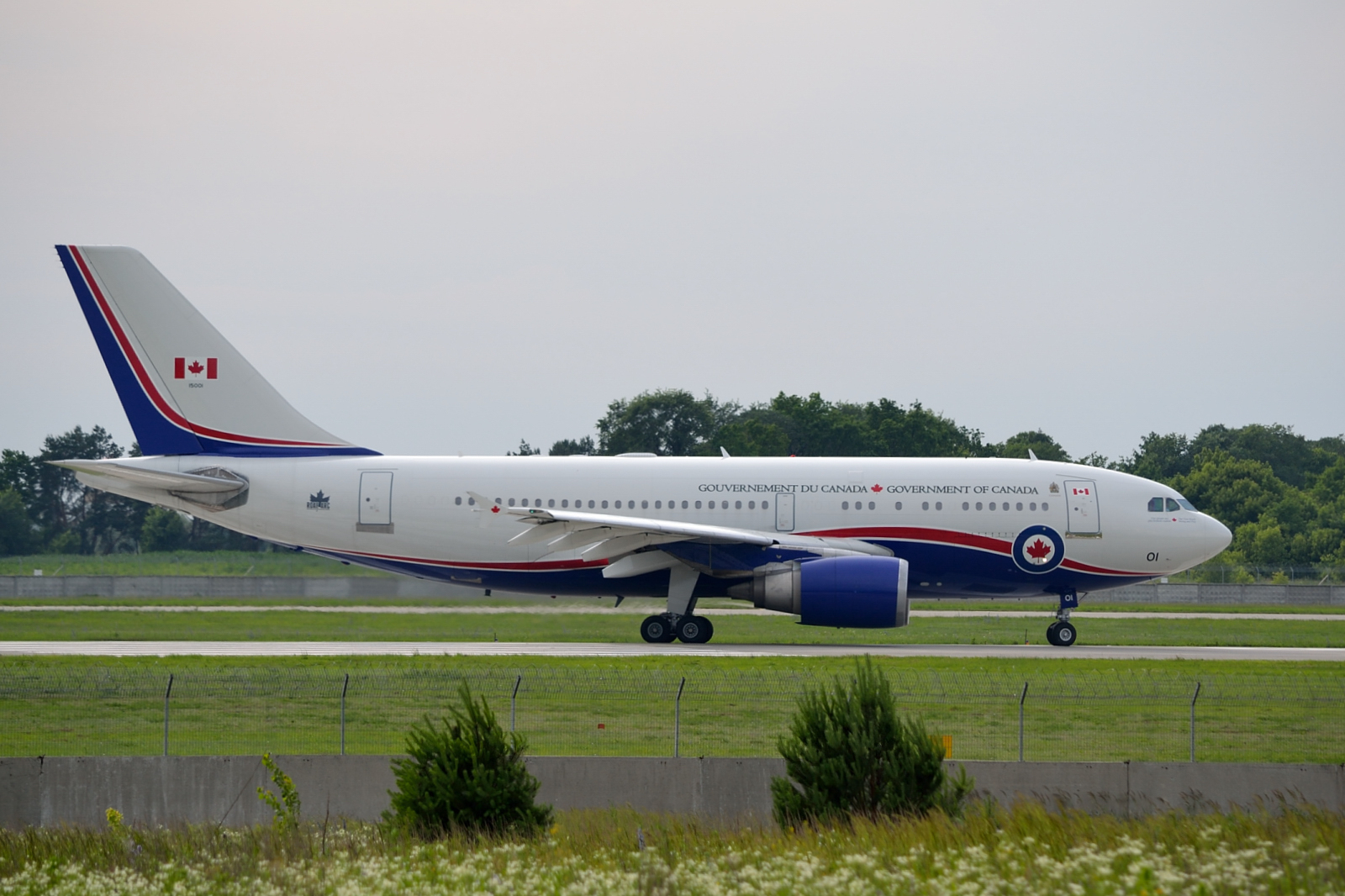
CC-150 Polaris No. 01 in its 2013 unique VIP-service livery (2014)

In 2011, it emerged that since early 2009 the office of Prime Minister Stephen Harper had repeatedly requested that the VIP-configured CC-150, aircraft #01, be repainted from the gun-metal military paint scheme it shared with the other CC-150s to a specialized paint scheme. The Department of National Defence, including Minister Peter MacKay, had resisted this request, noting that it was contrary to its multi-role nature and would compromise the aircraft's potential to safely transport personnel into a combat zone. In 2013, the VIP-configured CC-150 was repainted during scheduled heavy maintenance at a cost of $50,000. The new scheme, predominantly white with significant quantities of blue and smaller amounts of red, was criticized by opposition politicians, who alleged the repainting was intended to give prominence to the then-governing Conservative Party of Canada's traditional blue colour.

In recent years, various mechanical problems have occurred. In October 2016, a flap issue forced the aircraft to return to Ottawa 30 minutes after takeoff while Trudeau was en route to Belgium to sign the Canada Europe free trade deal. In March 2018, Prime Minister Trudeau's trip to India was delayed because of a mechanical issue during a refuelling stop in Rome.

In December 2019, the VIP CC-150 suffered significant structural damage to the nose and right engine cowling. While being towed by contracted personnel at CFB Trenton, it rolled into the back wall of a hangar. The aircraft was scheduled to remain out of service until August 2020, but the grounding was extended due to the effects of the COVID-19 pandemic. It was returned to service in March 2021.

In September 2023, Trudeau's return from the G20 summit in India was postponed due to "technical issues" with the aircraft. Another CC-150 was sent from CFB Trenton to pick up Trudeau.

=== Replacement ===
In 2021 the Government of Canada began an effort to replace all five CC-150 Polaris aircraft. The Polaris are over 30 years old with lifespan set to end in 2027. The replacement tender is expected to cost US$5 billion. Early bid candidates included the Airbus A330 MRTT and the Boeing KC-46, but the latter has since been dropped. On 14 July 2022, Canada announced that it has finalized a contract to acquire two A330-200 aircraft as the first two aircraft for the RCAF that will provide a strategic transport and air-to-air refuelling role—currently fulfilled by the fleet of five CC-150 Polaris aircraft—as part of the Strategic Tanker Transport Capability (STTC) project. The two A330 aircraft are former civilian airliners owned by International Airfinance Corporation. The new fleet will include four new and five used aircraft that are being outfitted to feature the same capabilities.

== Variants ==
CC-150
1 VIP transport (15001 is now retired)
2 strategic airlifters (15002 and 15003 with latter scrapped)
CC-150T
2 aerial refuelling tankers/strategic airlifters (15004 and 15005)

== Operators ==
Canada

- Royal Canadian Air Force (4) - 2 CC-150T and 2 CC-150 Polaris
  - 437 Transport Squadron

== Aircraft on display ==
The following aircraft are on public display:

- 15001, on display at the National Air Force Museum of Canada

== Specifications ==
Data from CC-150 Polaris.

General characteristics

- Crew: 2 (flight crew)
- Capacity: 194 passengers (up to) or 33,000 kg (73,000 lb) payload
- Length: 46.66 m (153 ft 1 in)
- Wingspan: 43.9 m (144 ft 0 in)
- Height: 15.8 m (51 ft 10 in)
- Empty weight: 80,000 kg (176,370 lb)
- Gross weight: 157,000 kg (346,126 lb)
- Powerplant: 2 × General Electric CF6-80C2A2 high bypass turbofan engines, 220 kN (50,000 lbf) thrust each

Performance

- Maximum speed: Mach 0.84
- Range: 9,600 km (6,000 mi, 5,200 nmi)
- Service ceiling: 12,500 m (41,000 ft)

== See also ==
Related development

- Airbus A310
- Airbus A310 MRTT
- Military transport aircraft

Aircraft of comparable role, configuration, and era

- Boeing KC-767
- McDonnell Douglas KC-10 Extender
- Boeing KC-135 Stratotanker
- Airbus A330 MRTT

Related lists

- List of active Canadian military aircraft
