= Boeing CC-137 =

Boeing 707 transport of the Canadian Forces

CC-137
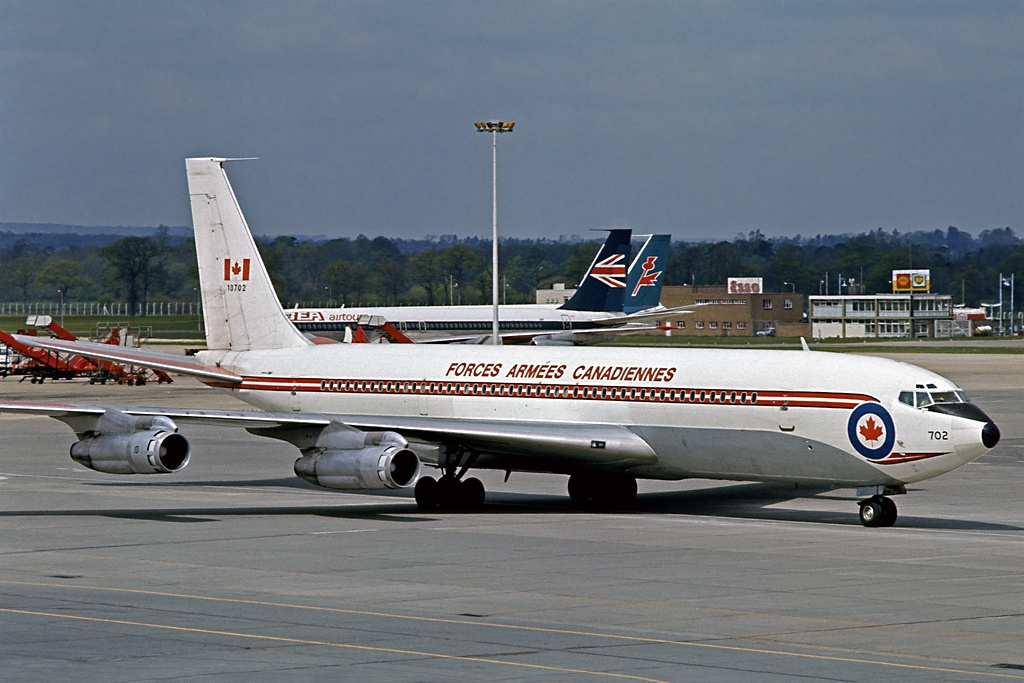
- A Canadian Armed Forces Boeing 707 (CC-137)

General information
- Type: Military transport aircraft
- Manufacturer: Boeing
- Status: Retired
- Primary user: Canadian Forces
- Number built: 5

History
- Introduction date: 1972
- First flight: 1970
- Retired: 1997
- Developed from: Boeing 707

The Boeing CC-137 is a retired transport and tanker aircraft which served with the Canadian Forces from 1970 to 1997. The Boeing 707-347C aircraft provided long range passenger transport for the military, VIP transport for government and air-to-air refueling for fighters such as the CF-116 Freedom Fighter and CF-18 Hornet. It was replaced by the Airbus CC-150 Polaris in the transport role and much later in the tanker role.

== Design and development ==
During the 1960s, the Royal Canadian Air Force set out a requirement to replace the aging fleet of Canadair CC-106 Yukons and Canadair CC-109 Cosmopolitan transports. Initially, the Boeing KC-135 was being considered because the versatile design could also fulfill a yet-unspecified aerial refuelling role. Although a "purpose-built" aircraft would have suited the RCAF requirements better, an opportunity to acquire Boeing 707s as an alternative, soon presented itself.

== Operational history ==
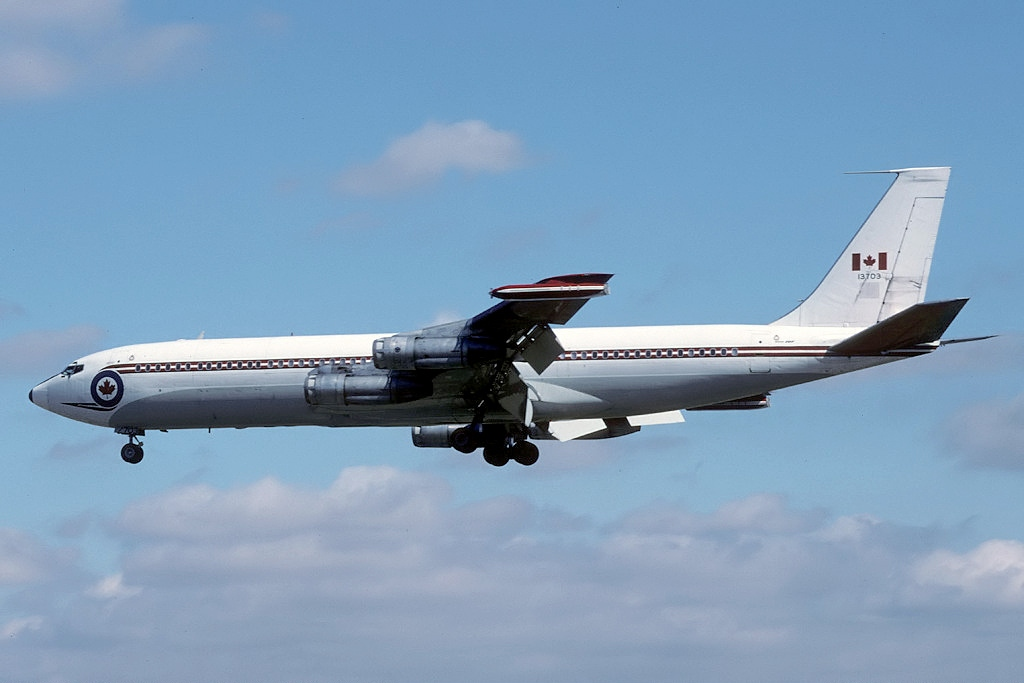
Boeing CC-137 tanker in 1994

Canada purchased five Boeing 707s in 1970–71 to replace the RCAF's CC-106 Yukons in the long range transport role and the CC-109 Cosmopolitan as an executive or short-range transport. The first four aircraft had been built for Western Airlines, but that order was subsequently cancelled; the fifth was bought separately a year later. To fulfil Canada's requirements for aerial refueling, two aircraft were fitted with Beechcraft made probe and drogue refueling pods in 1972. The two sets of refuelling equipment were moved from aircraft to aircraft to keep fleet utilization even between the airframes.

The CC-137 fleet had a combined total of 191,154 hours, remaining in service in the transport role until 1995, with two aircraft continuing in use as tankers until 1997.

Most of the fleet ended up with the Northrop Grumman E-8 Joint STARS programme either for spare parts or conversion to E-8C standard for the United States Air Force.

== Operators ==
Canada

- Canadian Forces Air Command
  - No. 437 "Husky" Squadron RCAF based at CFB Trenton, Ontario

== Specifications (CC-137) ==
Data from Boeing CC137 (707-347C)

General characteristics

- Crew: 3
- Capacity: 170 passengers and 90,000 lb (41,000 kg) payload
- Length: 152 ft 11 in (46.61 m)
- Wingspan: 145 ft 9 in (44.42 m)
- Height: 42 ft 5 in (12.93 m)
- Wing area: 3,010 sq ft (280 m^{2})
- Empty weight: 140,000 lb (63,569 kg)
- Max takeoff weight: 327,000 lb (148,000 kg)
- Powerplant: 4 × Pratt & Whitney JT3D-7 turbofans, 19,700 lbf (88 kN) thrust each

Performance

- Cruise speed: 618 mph (994 km/h, 537 kn)
- Range: 5,000 mi (9,300 km, 5,800 nmi)
- Service ceiling: 39,000 ft (12,000 m)

== See also ==
Related development

- Boeing 707
- Boeing C-137 Stratoliner
- Boeing KC-135 Stratotanker

Related lists

- List of aircraft of Canada's air forces
