= Meggitt Vindicator II =

Canadian-built unmanned aerial vehicle

Vindicator II

General information
- Type: Unmanned Aerial Vehicle – Training Target
- National origin: Canada
- Manufacturer: Meggitt Training Systems Canada - now Qinetiq Target Systems Canada
- Status: Retired
- Primary users: Canadian Forces United States Navy
- Number built: 1-2 (Canada); 1 (USN)

The Meggitt Vindicator II is a Canadian-built unmanned aerial vehicle – training target formerly used by the Canadian Forces and United States Navy. It was used to simulate various types of targets like missiles and aircraft, including helicopters. The vehicle was not powered, but was launched via pneumatic catapult.

== Operators ==
Canada

- Canadian Forces - as CU-162

United States

- United States Navy

== On display ==
- 1 UAV-T donated to Canadian War Museum in 2010
- 1 UAV-T at Naval Museum of Alberta
- 1 Reynolds-Alberta Museum

== Specifications (Vindicator II) ==
Data from http://targetsystems.qinetiq.com/static/media/files/Vindicator_UAV-T_DS-AT-VN-V01_sw_final.pdf

General characteristics

- Crew: None
- Length: 2.72 m (8 ft 11 in)
- Wingspan: 2.59 m (8 ft 6 in)
- Height: 0.51 m (1 ft 8 in)
- Wing area: 1.7 m^{2} (18 sq ft)
- Empty weight: 68 kg (150 lb)
- Gross weight: 77 kg (170 lb)
- Fuel capacity: 23L

Performance

- Maximum speed: 322 km/h (200 mph, 174 kn)
- Range: 190 km (120 mi, 100 nmi)
- Endurance: 1.5 hours
- Service ceiling: 910 m (3,000 ft)
