= SAGEM Sperwer =

Dutch UAV

Sperwer
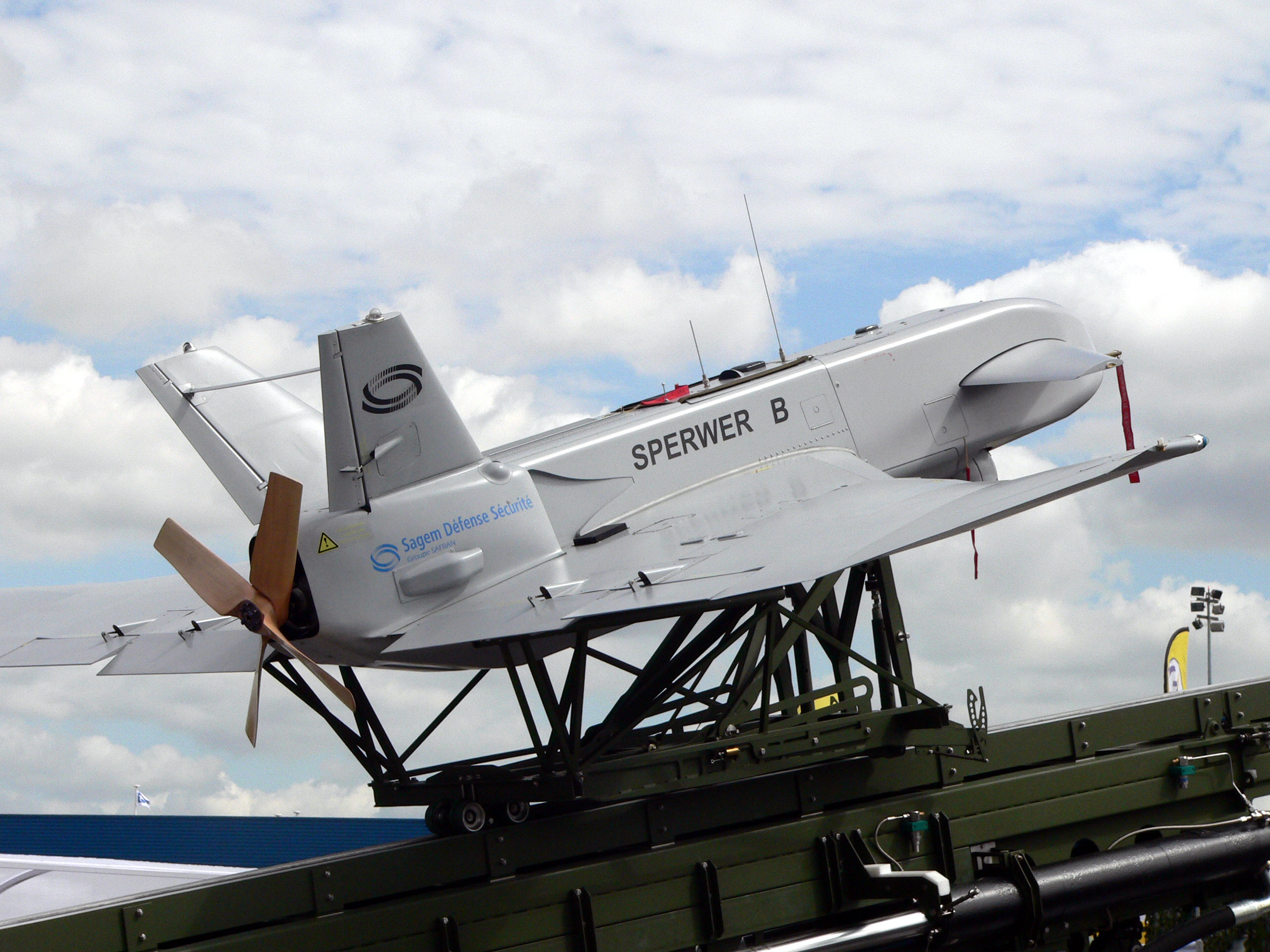
- Sperwer B on its launch rail

General information
- Type: Reconnaissance aircraft/UAV
- Manufacturer: SAGEM
- Primary users: French Army Canadian Armed Forces (Retired)

The SAGEM Sperwer (Pronounced Spehr-wuhr, Dutch for Sparrowhawk) is an unmanned aerial vehicle manufactured by the French firm SAGEM. The aircraft is piloted remotely and can cruise at altitudes of over 16,000 feet for as long as five hours. It can send back images of targets up to 150 kilometers away from its ground control station.

== Operational history ==
The Sperwer is currently in service with the French Army (61^{e} régiment d'artillerie), the Royal Netherlands Air Force, Swedish Air Force, United States Air National Guard, Hellenic Army (Greece) with the Netherlands in the process of removing them from front line use.

Canadian Armed Forces operated the Sperwer in Afghanistan between 2003 and its last mission on 18 April 2009 when it was replaced with the Israeli built IAI Heron.

The Royal Danish Army also bought Sperwer, but a series of problems forced the Ministry of Defence to cancel the programme and sell the remainder to Canada. As well the Danish Army no longer operate any aircraft and there are no plans for UAVs by the Royal Danish Air Force. Canada itself removed the Sperwers from front-line use in 2009, while the Netherlands was planning to phase its Sperwer drones out of front line use in March 2009 in favor of rented UAVs from Israel's Aeronautics Defense Systems Ltd.

== Operators ==
Canada
Canadian Armed Forces. Designated CU-161 in service; retired.
Denmark
Danish Army. Programme cancelled.
France
French Army. In service with three more ordered and an option on another five, all with enhanced sensors.
Greece
Hellenic Army. In service.
Netherlands
Royal Netherlands Air Force. Retired.
Sweden
Swedish Army. Designated UAV01 Ugglan (the Owl) in service; retired.
United States
Air National Guard.

== Aircraft on display ==
Six of the retired Sperwers can be found in Canadian museums:

- AirForce Museum Society of Alberta – serial number 026
- Canada Aviation and Space Museum – serial number 001
- National Air Force Museum of Canada – serial number 007
- Greenwood Military Aviation Museum − 161026 and spare parts from 028

Two of the retired Sperwers can be found in Dutch museums:

- Nationaal Militair Museum, former Soesterberg Air Base Netherlands – serial number Z061
- Artillery Museum, Netherlands – serial number Z051

== See also ==
Related lists

- List of active Canadian military aircraft
