= List of aircraft of the Royal Canadian Navy =

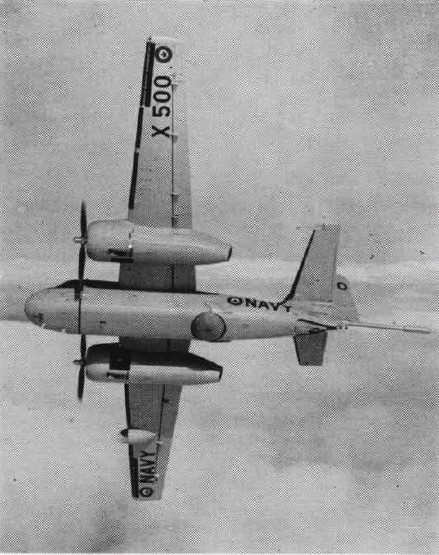
Royal Canadian Navy Grumman Tracker banking away.

This is a list of aircraft of the Royal Canadian Navy covering the period until 1968 when all aircraft operations were transferred to the newly unified Canadian Armed Forces, originally with Maritime Command and since 1975 with Air Command, which has subsequently been renamed as the Royal Canadian Air Force (RCAF).

Prior to World War II (WWII) the Royal Canadian Navy (RCN) did not operate aircraft. During World War I, the Royal Navy Canadian Air Service, a component of the Royal Naval Air Service, used seaplanes to carry out anti-submarine patrols off the Canadian East Coast. After the United States entered the war, the United States Navy established two seaplane bases in Nova Scotia for similar patrols, and the Royal Canadian Naval Air Service (RCNAS) was formed to assume responsibility for these flights; however, the war ended before the RCNAS was ready to operate independently, so it was disbanded and the two bases were deactivated and handed over to the Air Board.

During WWII, Canadian personnel manned the carriers HMS Nabob (from 1943 until torpedoed in 1944) and HMS Puncher (from 1944 until returned to the US in 1946), with their complement of Royal Navy Fleet Air Arm (FAA) carrier based aircraft. Canadian naval aviators including pilots of the RCN Volunteer Reserve also served in the FAA aboard carriers of the Royal Navy Pacific Fleet.

With the loan of HMCS Warrior in 1946, the RCN received its first aircraft, operating Fairey Firefly fighter-bombers and Supermarine Seafire fighters loaned from the Royal Navy. When both aircraft and the ship failed to meet Canadian requirements, HMCS Magnificent was purchased in 1948, along with Hawker Sea Fury fighters and in 1950, Grumman Avenger torpedo bombers.

From then until 1968, the RCN operated a variety of fixed wing and rotary wing aircraft. After the Canadian Forces sold off HMCS Bonaventure in 1970, Canadian naval vessels operated only Sea King helicopters. The Trackers were transferred to land bases to perform coastal patrols, while the Sikorsky HO4S plane-guard helicopters were retired, and other types still in service were allocated as per their RCAF equivalents.

Aircraft that remained in service after unification are highlighted in blue.

== Aircraft ==
Name	1968 CF designator	Place of manufacture	Primary role(s)	Service period	# used	Notes
Avro Anson Mk.V	n/a	UK, Canada	utility/trainer	1946–1952	2	ex-Royal Canadian Air Force
Beechcraft Expeditor	CT-128	US	transport/trainer	1952–1960	10	ex-Royal Canadian Air Force
Bell HTL-4 & HTL-6	n/a	US	utility helicopter	1951–1967	8	
Canadair Silver Star	CT-133	Canada	trainer	1955–2002	16	ex-Royal Canadian Air Force
de Havilland DH.82C Tiger Moth	n/a	UK, Canada	trainer	1948–1957	3	ex-Royal Canadian Air Force
Fairey Albacore	n/a	UK	torpedo bomber	1943–1949	6	(Note: transferred to RCN but never flown)
Fairey Firefly	n/a	UK	fighter strike-reconnaissance	1946–1953	76	on loan. (Note: ex-Royal Navy Fleet Air Arm)
Fairey Swordfish	n/a	UK	torpedo bomber	1946–1948	22	
Grumman Avenger	n/a	US	torpedo bomber/ASW/AEW	1950–1960	125	(Note: ex-US Navy) (Note: Extensively modified for anti-submarine warfare (ASW) role, number includes Airborne early warning (AEW) variant.)
Grumman CS2F Tracker	CP-121	US, Canada	ASW	1956–1994	100	(Note: 102 RCN CS2F serial numbers were assigned. 99 Trackers built under licence by de Havilland Canada were assigned RCN serial numbers 1502-1600 and used operationally. One US-built S2F-1 was obtained for manufacturing verification and was assigned RCN number 1500. In 1954, this aircraft was given serial number X-500 and was reassigned to operational testing. In 1956, it was upgraded to CS2F-1 standards and assigned serial number 1501, and was used as a stationary instructional airframe at Shearwater until 1972. It is not known whether this aircraft was ever assigned a U.S. Navy bureau number.)
Hawker Sea Fury	n/a	UK	fighter	1948–1957	75	(Note: One FB.10 and 74 FB.11)
McDonnell F2H Banshee	n/a	US	fighter	1955–1962	39	
North American Harvard	n/a	Canada	trainer	1946–1958	36	(Note: ex-Royal Canadian Air Force) (Note: Built by Noorduyn and Canadian Car & Foundry)
Piasecki HUP-3 Retriever	n/a	US	rescue/utility helicopter	1954–1964	3	(Note: Ex-US Army, built as H-25A and transferred to RCN in May 1954, modified and redesignated on delivery to conform to US Navy HUP-3 standards)
Schweizer SGS 2-12	n/a	US	training glider	1946–1949	1	
Sikorsky CHSS-2 Sea King	CH-124	US, Canada	ASW helicopter	1963–2018	41	
Sikorsky HO4S	n/a	US	rescue/ASW helicopter	1952–1970	13	(Note: Originally three HO4S-2 and ten HO4S-3; both remaining airworthy HO4S-2 aircraft upgraded to HO4S-3 standards in 1955-1956)
Supermarine Seafire	n/a	UK	fighter	1946–1954	35	on loan.
Supermarine Walrus	n/a	UK	utility amphibian	1946–1946	4	(Note: Used by No.1 Naval Air Gunner School/743 Fleet Requirements Unit)

== See also ==
- List of aircraft of Canada's air forces
