= BAE Systems Silver Fox =

Tactical reconnaissance drone

Silver Fox
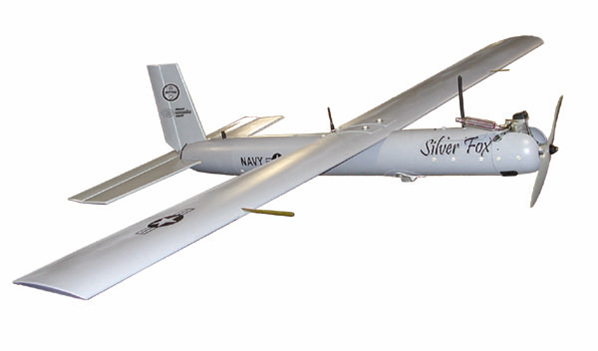

General information
- Type: Unmanned aerial vehicle
- National origin: United States
- Manufacturer: Sensintel Inc.

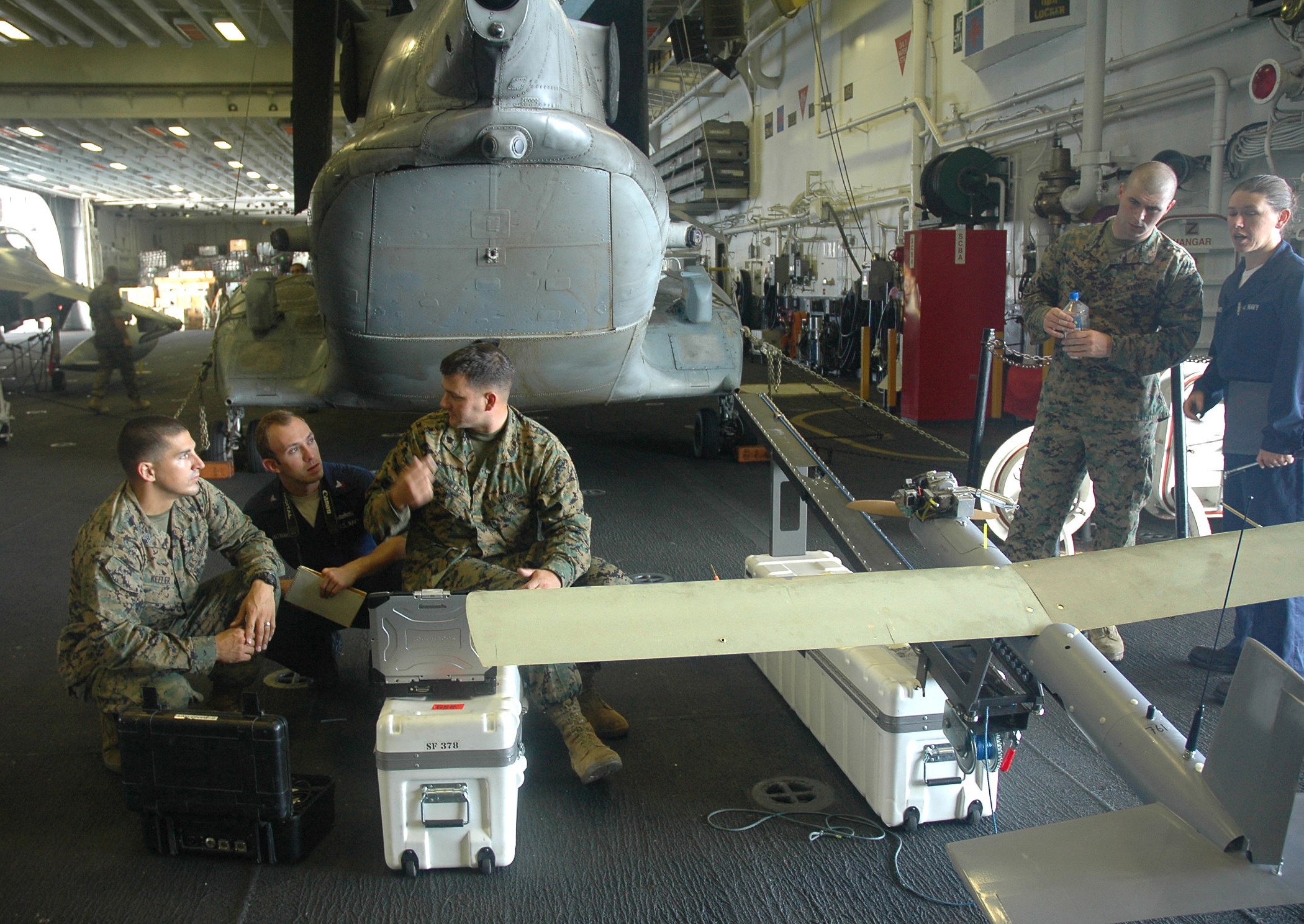
U.S. Marines with the 15th Marine Expeditionary Unit (MEU) display the Silver Fox UAV to Sailors aboard the amphibious assault ship USS Boxer (LHD 4).

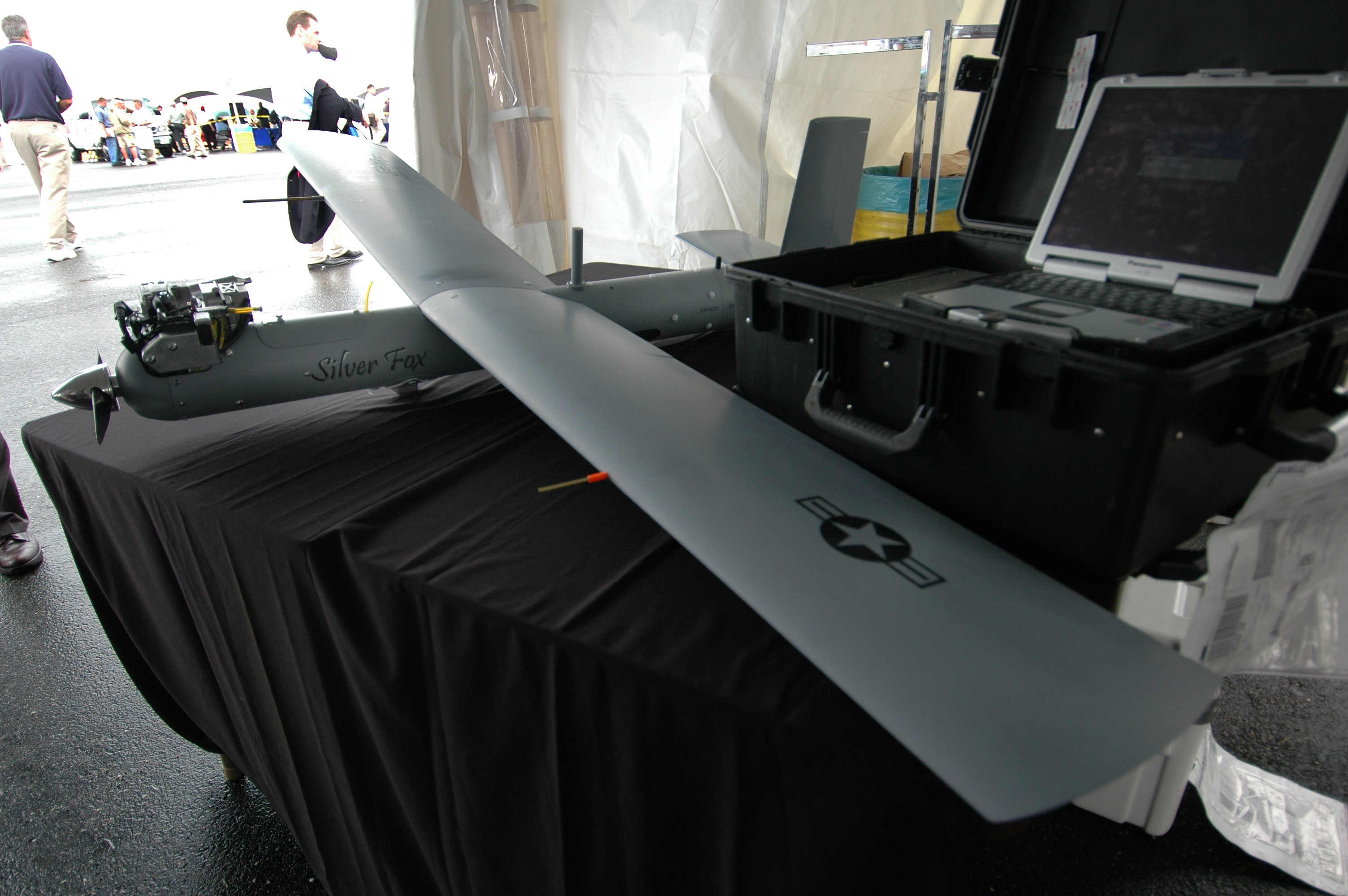
St. Inigoes, Md – A Silver Fox UAV and its operator's station on display at the 2005 Naval UAV Air Demo held at the Webster Field Annex of Naval Air Station Patuxent River.

The Sensintel Silver Fox UAV is an Unmanned aerial vehicle (UAV) that can conduct autonomous aerial surveillance imaging. The Silver Fox UAV is designed to provide low cost aerial surveillance imaging and carry sensor payload packages weighing up to four pounds. Video images are transmitted from Silver Fox to a ground station for quick reference. One ground station can simultaneously operate ten units.

== Design and development ==
The Silver Fox was originally developed by Advanced Ceramics Research (ACR), which was purchased by BAE in 2009. Sensintel Inc. purchased BAE Systems Unmanned Aircraft Programs in June 2013. Raytheon purchased Sensintel in January 2015.

The Silver Fox is a gas-powered unmanned system, weighing about 30 pounds. It can carry electro-optical and infrared sensors, providing full-motion imagery for both day and night operations. The Silver Fox carries small payloads and performs autonomous takeoffs and landings. The Silver Fox UAV supports military operations during intelligence, surveillance, and reconnaissance missions.

In July 2013, the Colombian Air Force bought three Silver Fox UAVs, along with rail launchers, ground control stations, and video systems for each.

== Operational history ==
Silver Fox drones were deployed to the southern Philippines by the US military, participating in operations in the Moro conflict. At least one Silver Fox was captured by MILF rebels.

== Specifications (Silver Fox) ==
Data from BAE

General characteristics

- Capacity: 0
- Empty weight: 25 lb (11 kg)
- Fuel capacity: 2.6l

Performance

- Maximum speed: 50 kn (58 mph, 93 km/h)
- Cruise speed: 45 kn (52 mph, 83 km/h)
- Stall speed: 28 kn (32 mph, 52 km/h)8 hours endurance
