= Airbus A310 MRTT =

Air to air refuelling tanker and transport aircraft

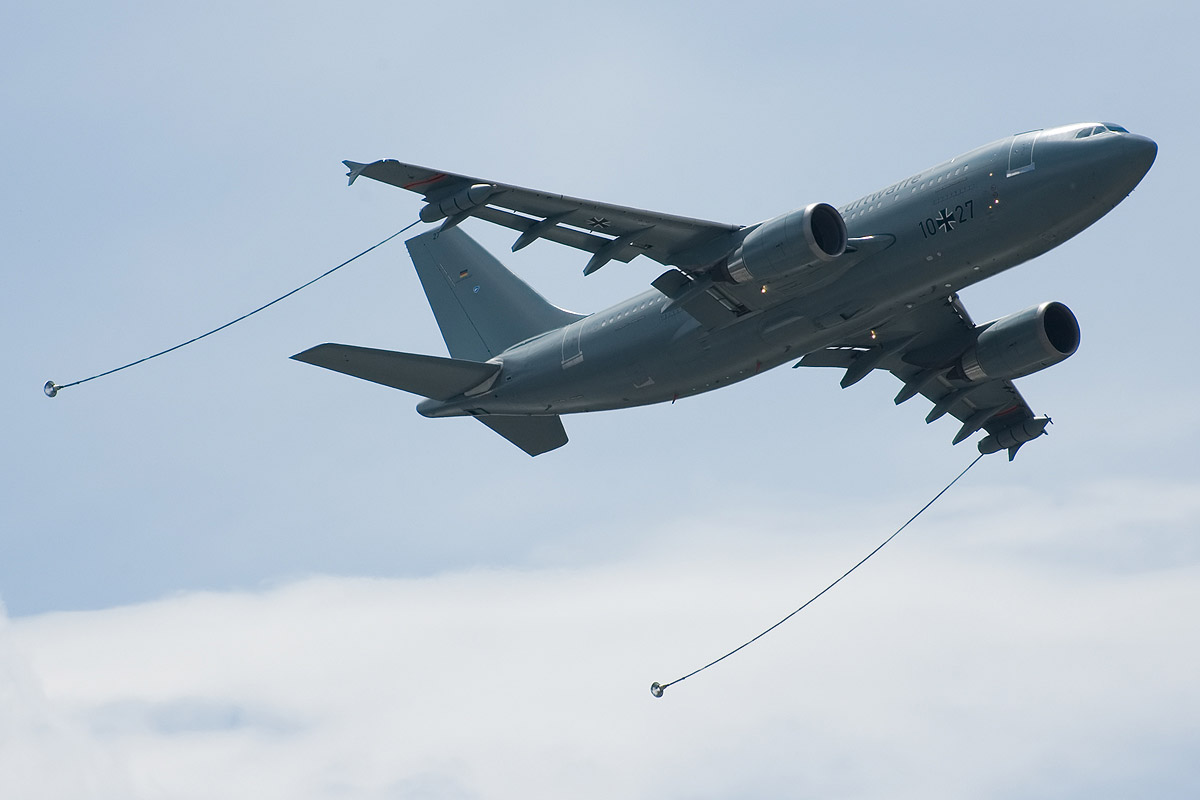
- A310 MRTT of the German Air Force (Luftwaffe) ready for air to air refuelling

General information
- Type: Multi-role tanker/transport
- Manufacturer: Airbus Military SAS, Airbus Deutschland, Lufthansa Technik
- Designer: Airbus Military SAS
- Status: In service
- Primary users: German Air Force Royal Canadian Air Force
- Number built: 6, (from existing A310-300C airframes)

History
- Introduction date: October 2004
- First flight: December 2003
- Developed from: Airbus A310-300C
- Variant: Airbus CC-150 Polaris
- Successors: Airbus A330 MRTT

The Airbus A310 MRTT Multi-Role Tanker Transport is a military air-to-air refuelling, or in-flight refuelling tanker transport aircraft, capable of operating multi-role missions. The A310 MRTT tanker aircraft is a subsequent development from the earlier Airbus A310 MRT Multi-Role Transport, which was a military transport aircraft for passengers, cargo, and medical evacuation. The A310 MRT and A310 MRTT are both specialist military conversions of existing airframes of the civilian Airbus A310-300C wide-bodied passenger jet airliner.

== Airbus A310 MRTT ==
=== Design and development ===
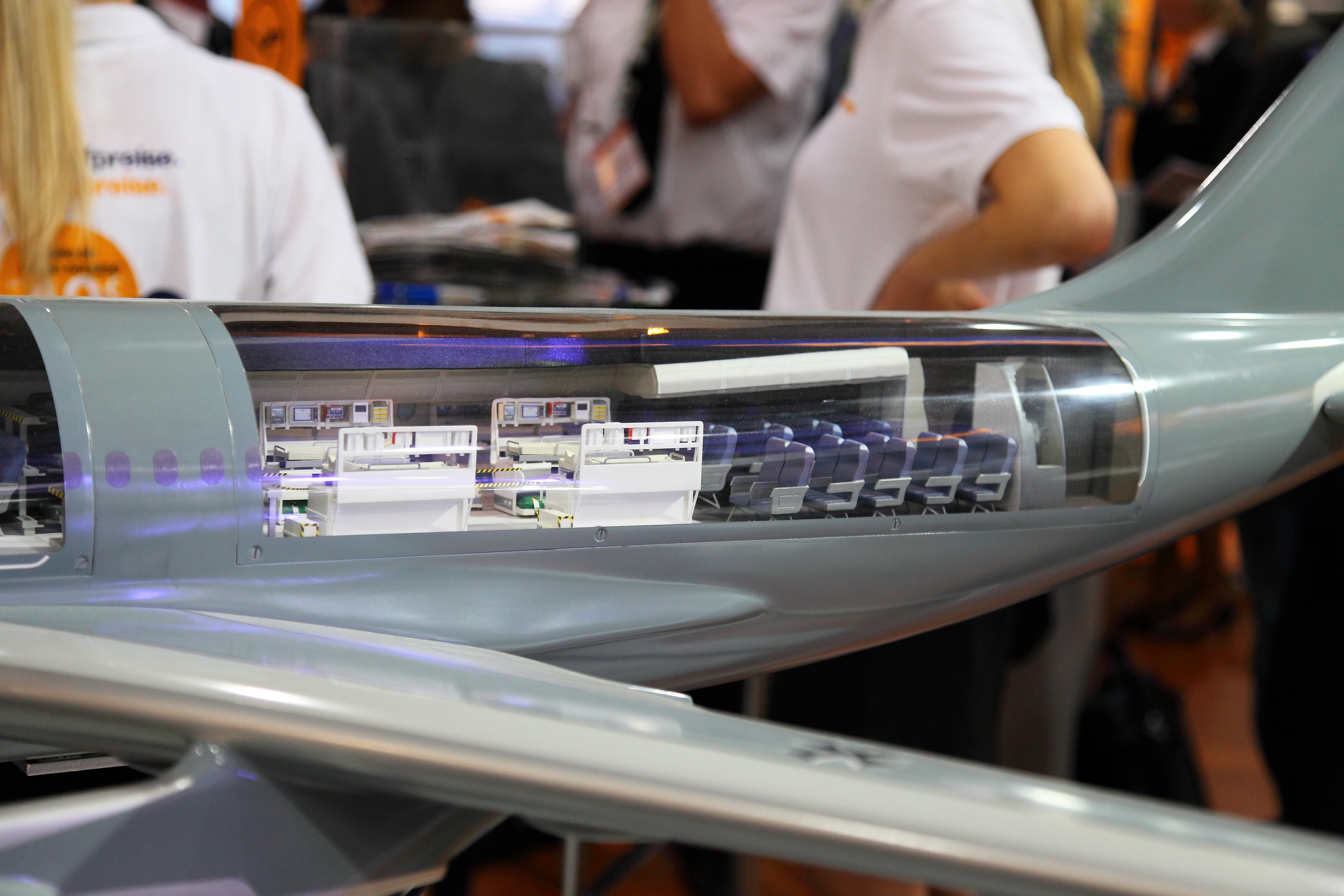
Sectioned scale model of the Luftwaffe A310 MRT, demonstrating its multi-role fitment showing the MedEvac intensive care units, with conventional passenger seating aft.

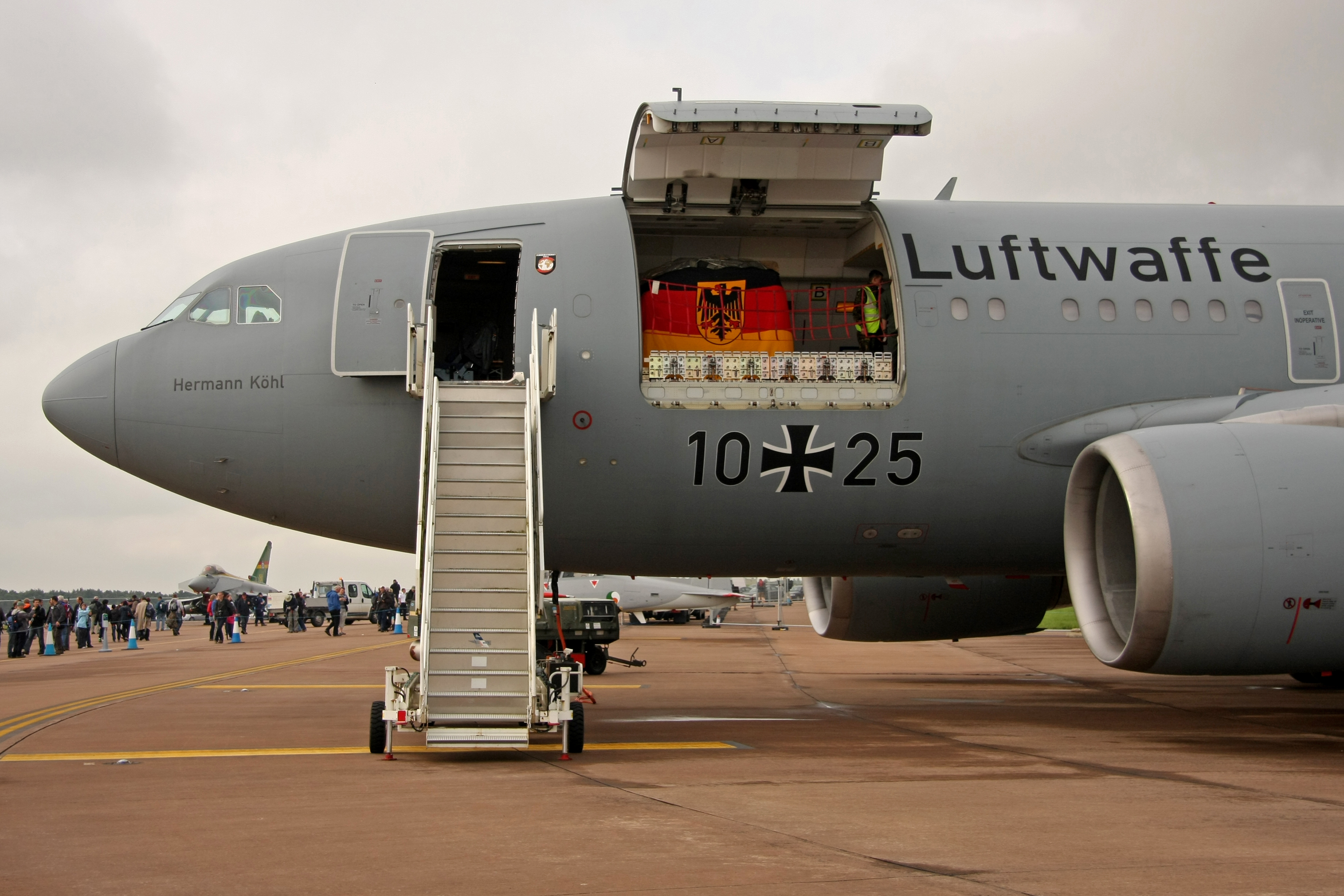
Main deck cargo door (port side) open on Luftwaffe A310 MRT 10+25

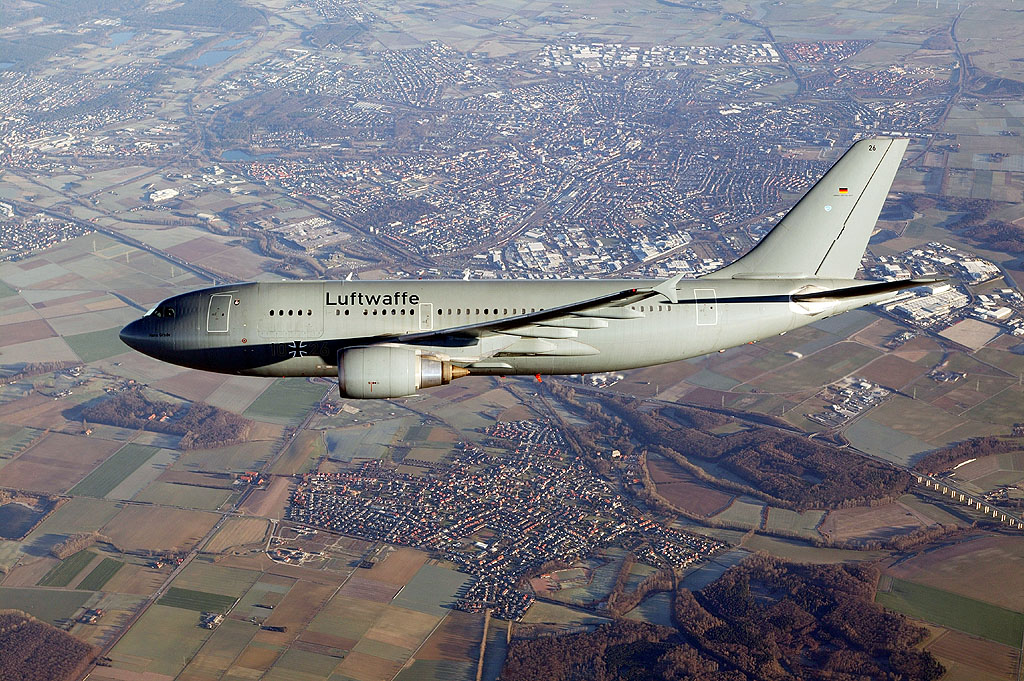
MedEvac version of Luftwaffe A310 MRT

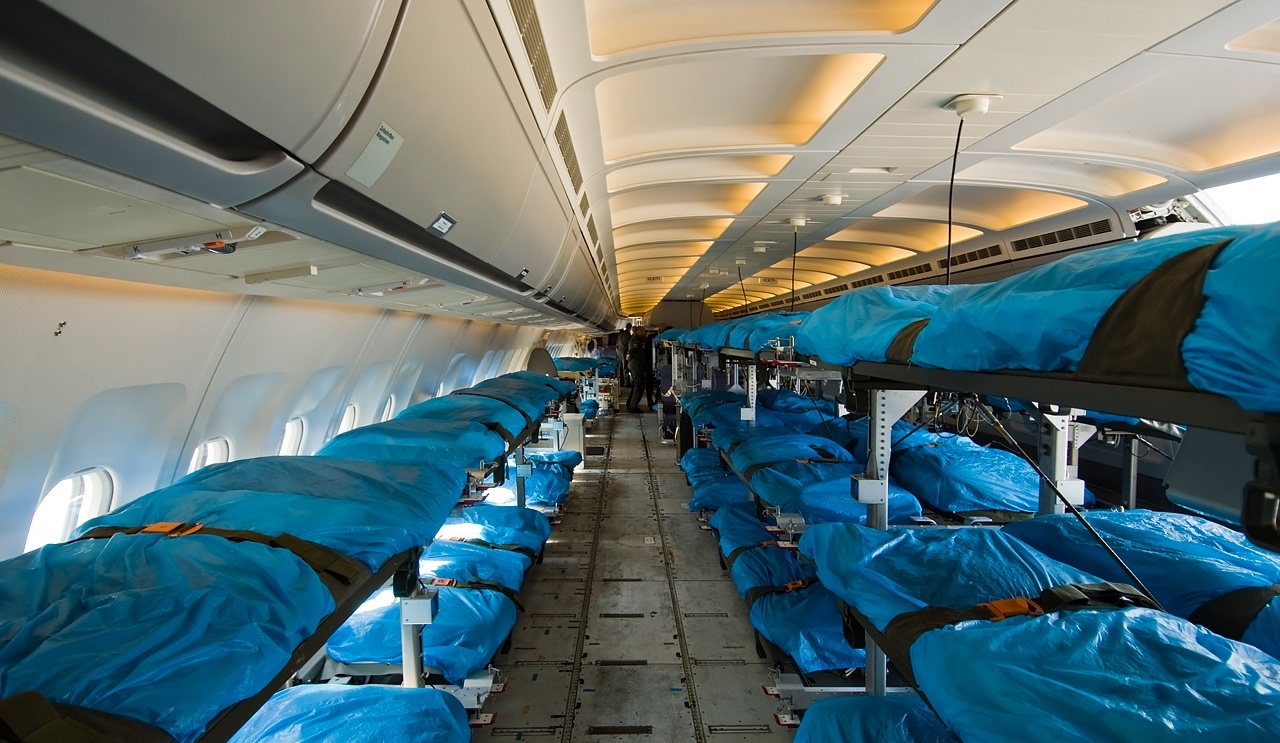
Interior of MedEvac version of Luftwaffe A310 MRT

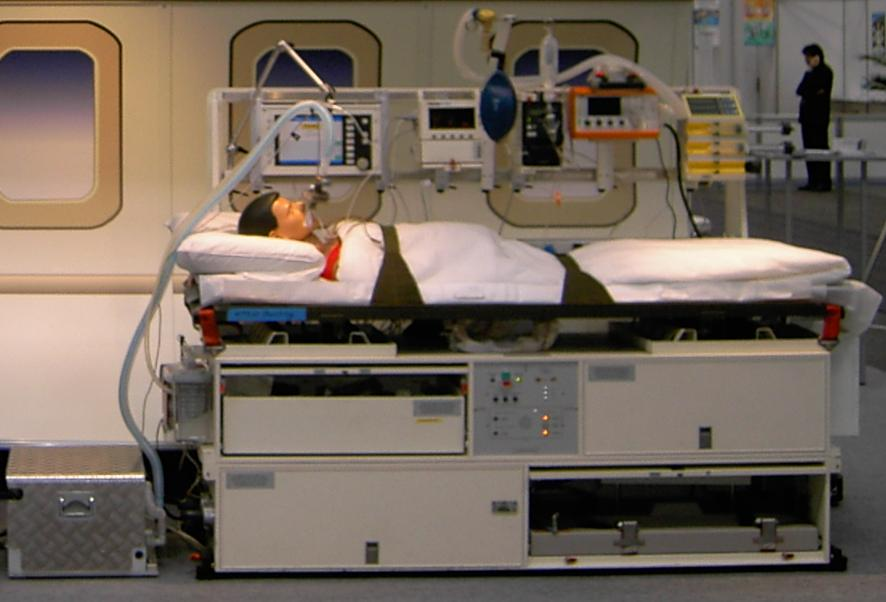
A MedEvac intensive care unit as used by the Luftwaffe in their A310 MRT

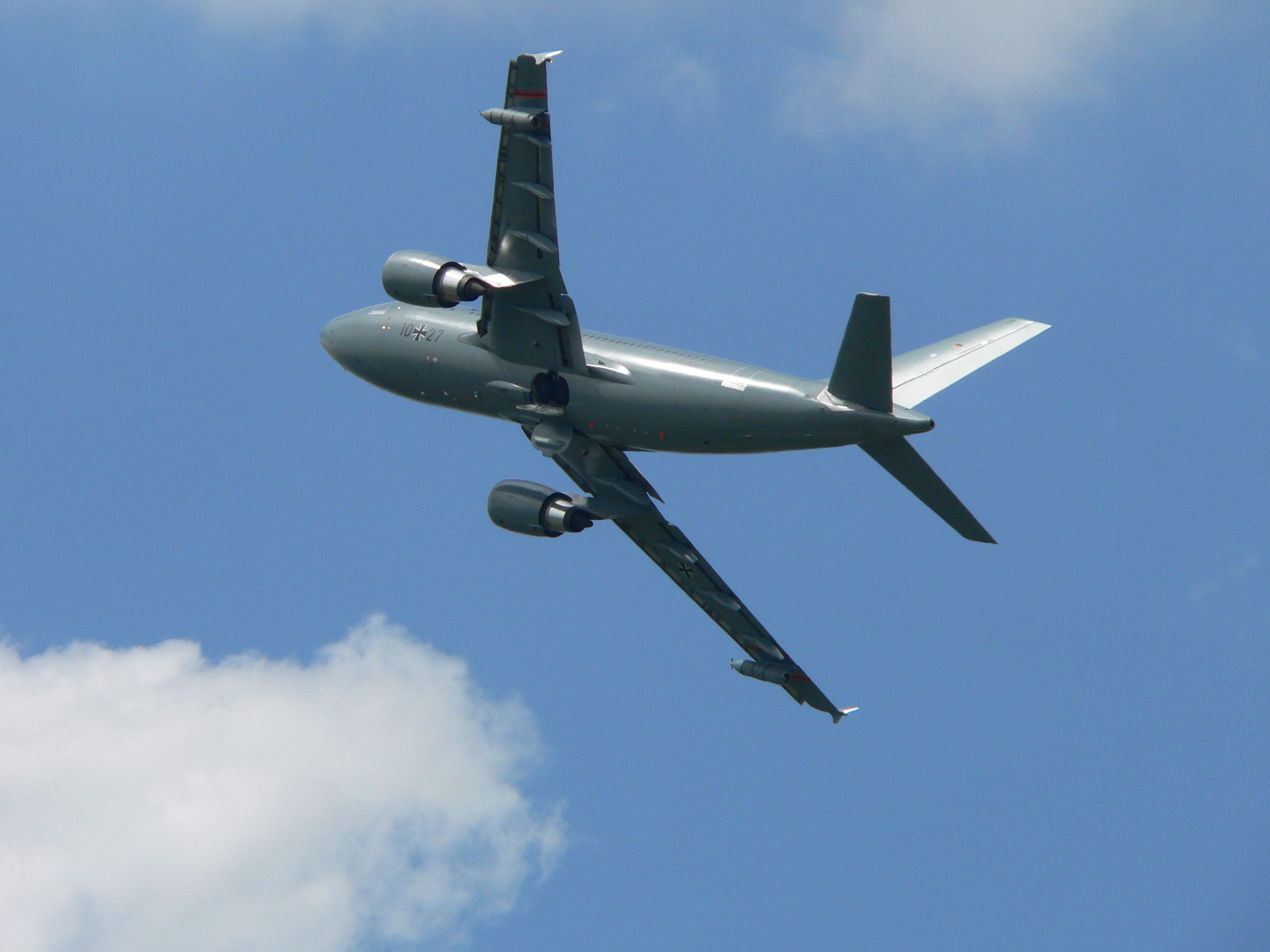
Underside of Luftwaffe A310 MRTT 10+27, displaying the Flight Refuelling Ltd (FRL) Mk32B pods close to the wingtips.

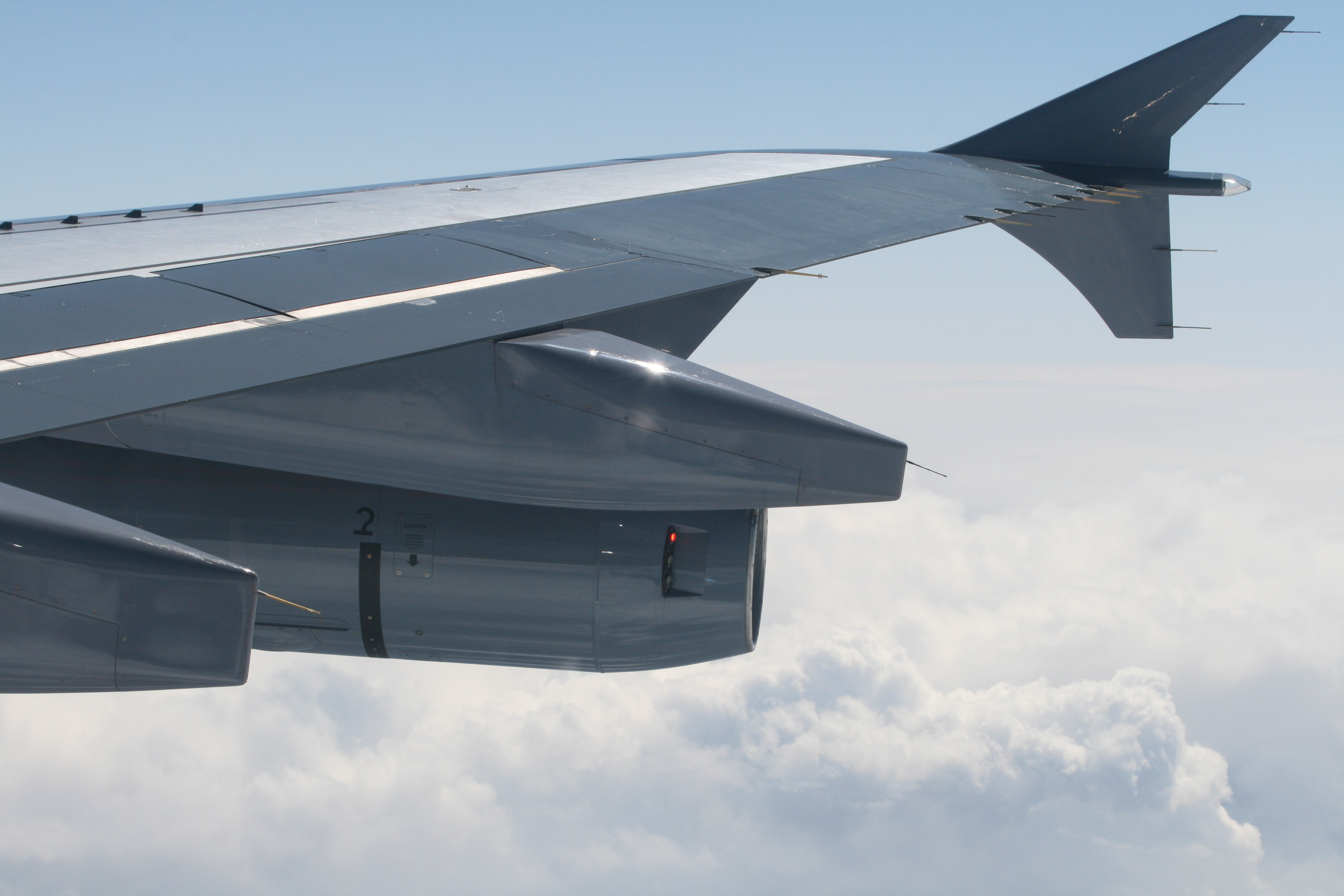
Close-up of the rear of the FRL Mk32B pods on the Royal Canadian Air Force (RCAF) CC-150 Polaris.

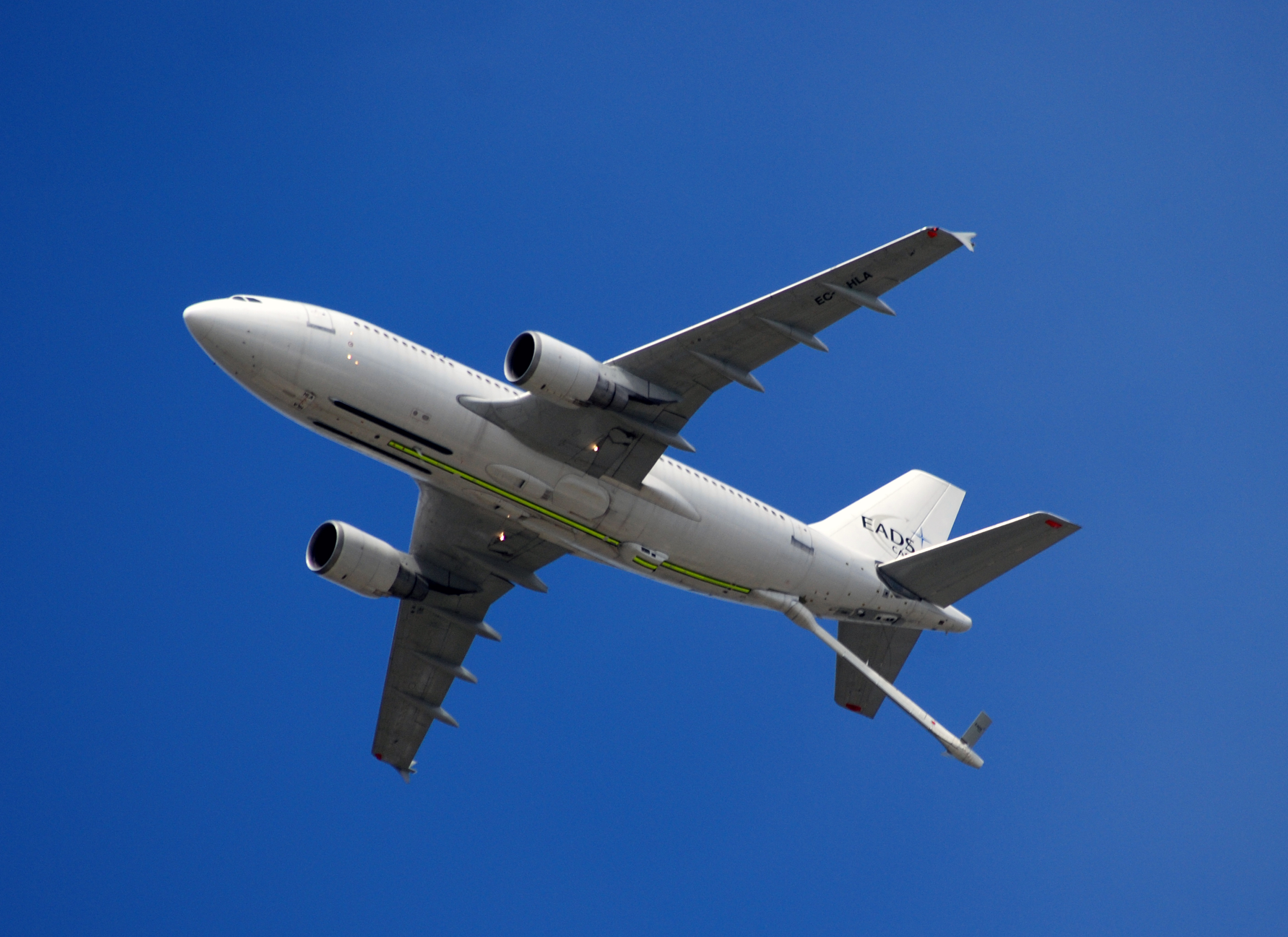
A310 MRTT flying boom air-to-air refuelling system demonstrator from EADS, 2008

The Airbus A310 MRTT Multi-Role Tanker Transport is a military derivative of the Airbus A310-300C twin-jet wide-bodied jet airliner. The A310 MRTT was primarily designed for military use as a multi-role air-to-air refuelling tanker, cargo transport, passenger transport, and aeromedical evacuation (MedEvac) aircraft.

The aircraft are designed, engineered, manufactured, and modified by Airbus Industrie and EADS subsidiary Airbus Military SAS, along with their subcontractors, which included Airbus Deutschland and Lufthansa Technik. The conversion from the A310 MRT involves:

- Installation of two air-to-air refuelling (AAR) pods, one under each wing, close to the wingtip;
- Five additional centre fuel tanks or Additional Centre Tanks (ACT), providing an extra 28,000 kilograms (62,000 pounds); giving a total capacity of 77,500 kilograms (170,900 pounds), or 96,920 litres (21,320 imperial gallons; 25,600 US gallons);
- Fuel operator station (FOS), in the cockpit immediately behind the captain, to control fuel offload, cameras, military radios, and exterior lighting. For MRTT, remote surveillance of approaching / air-to-air refuelling process with a night-vision capable video system had to be developed. This system (developed by a small company from Germany called FTI Group) allows operation both with visible light, and also near-infrared radiation. The refuelling monitor was integrated in the year 2008.;
- Reinforced wings and aircraft floor;
- Minor cockpit modifications.

The design of the in-flight refuelling pod and wing reinforcements and systems was subcontracted to ITD SA, at that time part of the Industria de Turbo Propulsores (ITP) Group.

When not used as an in-flight refueller, i.e., in an air cargo role, the A310 MRTT is capable of carrying a non-fuel payload of up to 37 tonnes (36 long tons; 41 short tons), or 81,600 lb. When used in a troop transport role, the A310 MRTT can accommodate up to 214 seats. And for a mixed-use combined troop transport and cargo, it can carry 54 troops and 12 pallets. The A310 MRTT contains four separate cargo systems within the fuselage, including the main deck cargo compartment, which is loaded and unloaded via the vertically opening main deck cargo door, located on the front left (port) side. This means that main deck cargo can be loaded by overhead crane, in addition to conventional cargo loading platforms. Below deck are three more cargo compartments, and can accommodate container and palletised loads up to 96 inches (2,400 millimetres) in height.

When used in the aero-medical MedEvac role, the A310 MRTT can accommodate up to six intensive care units, together with 56 conventional stretchers.

Operated by a crew of three: two pilots and the air-to-air refuelling (AAR) operator, the pilots are able to directly operate all functions of in-flight refuelling, even if the AAR post is deactivated. Depending on mission, the A310 MRTT can deliver up to 33 tonnes (32 long tons; 36 short tons) of fuel to receiver aircraft on an operation of 3,000 nautical miles (5,600 kilometres; 3,500 miles), or up to 40 tonnes (39 long tons; 44 short tons) of fuel during a 1,000 nautical miles (1,900 kilometres; 1,200 miles) mission. All fuel to receiver aircraft is supplied directly from the centre tank, if necessary, drawing fuel from conventional fuel tanks; this is controlled automatically by the fuel management system together with the centre of gravity computer, to ensure correct fuel feed to the engines, and maintaining the correct centre of gravity in flight.

The dual hose and drogue system was supplied by Flight Refuelling Ltd (FRL) of England, and uses the Mk32B pods under each wing on pylons, close to the wingtips. Two receiver aircraft can be refuelled simultaneously, and is capable of delivering 15,000 litres (3,300 imperial gallons; 4,000 US gallons) per minute.

While the original and current A310 MRTTs rely on probe and drogue for air-to-air refuelling, EADS has invested $90m in research and development of a flying boom refuelling system such as that used by the United States Air Force (USAF). They are now able to offer air tankers from the A310 with air-to-air refuelling pods to the larger A330 MRTT equipped with refuelling booms. When installed, the flying boom system can deliver fuel to receiver aircraft at a rate of 1,200 US gallons (4,500 litres; 1,000 imperial gallons) per minute, and is supplied by two hose drum units (HDU) centrally mounted side by side in the rear fuselage.

The A310 MRTT is 30% smaller by MTOW than the newer A330 MRTT. Since the production of A310 airframes was discontinued in 2007, the air-to-air refuelling conversion can only be made on existing refurbished airliners, or as an upgrade to A310 MRTs already used by air forces (the option taken by Germany and Canada). As an air tanker, it has a similar fuel capacity to the KC-135R. Because of the larger passenger cabin, it is much more flexible, offering good capacity for cargo, troop transport, VIP transport, or other uses; and lacking only the capacity to land on rough strips to qualify as a strategic transport. Airbus hopes to sell it to some of the countries that need to replace the aging Boeing 707s they use as tankers.

Pakistan has also ordered MRTT capability built on an A310, although the aircraft is no longer in production.

== Operators ==
=== Canada ===
The Royal Canadian Air Force (RCAF) converted two of their five existing A310 MRTs to MRTT configuration, which are known as the CC-150 Polaris in Canadian service, the first also delivered October 2004.

=== Germany ===
The German Air Force (Luftwaffe) was the first customer for the MRTT, converting four of their seven existing A310 MRTs, with deliveries starting in October 2004. During June 2007, EADS delivered the first upgraded A310 MRTT with new mission avionics to the German Air Force. This new mission avionics suite facilitated the allocation of the upgraded A310 MRTT to NATO Reaction Forces.

The first operational use with the German Luftwaffe took place on 4 February 2009; 17 years ago, when three German Eurofighter Typhoons of Jagdgeschwader 73 Steinhoff (30+23, 30+25, and 30+38), led by Colonel Andreas Schick, were refuelled en-route by an A310 MRTT tanker aircraft during their deployment from Laage Airbase (German: Flughafen Rostock-Laage), Rostock, Germany, to Yelahanka Air Force Station, near Bangalore, India. Despite not yet receiving final approval of in-flight refuelling operations by the German authorities, this air-to-air refuelling mission was sanctioned as part of the A310 MRTTs 'operational testing phase' for in-flight refuelling, and consisted of a flight route of nearly 8,200 kilometres (4,400 nautical miles; 5,100 miles), including a stopover at the Al Dahfra airbase (Arabic: قاعدة الظفرة الجوية) in the United Arab Emirates. The objective of the deployment to India was to demonstrate the Eurofighter in a competition for Medium Multi-Role Combat Aircraft (MMRCA), against competition from the Mikoyan MiG-35, the Saab Gripen, the Lockheed Martin F-16, the Boeing F-18E / F, and the Dassault Rafale.

== Specifications (A310 MRTT) ==
Data from Airforce-Technology.com Jane's Aircraft Recognition Guide 5th ed.

General characteristics

- Crew: Three (hose and drogue) or four (flying boom) flight crew (two pilots and other flight crew)
- Capacity: 214 passengers / 40,000 kg (88,000 lb) deliverable fuel / 36,000 kg (79,000 lb) cargo
- Length: 47.4 m (155 ft 6 in)
- Wingspan: 43.9 m (144 ft 0 in)
- Height: 15.81 m (51 ft 10 in)
- Empty weight: 113,999 kg (251,325 lb)
- Max takeoff weight: 164,000 kg (361,558 lb)
- Powerplant: 2 × General Electric CF6-80C2 or Pratt & Whitney PW4152 turbofan jet engines, 262 kN (59,000 lbf) thrust each

Performance

- Maximum speed: 978 km/h (608 mph, 528 kn)
- Maximum speed: Mach 0.79
- Range: 8,889 km (5,523 mi, 4,800 nmi)
- Ferry range: 13,000 km (8,100 mi, 7,000 nmi)

== See also ==
- Future Strategic Tanker Aircraft

Related development

- Airbus A310
- Airbus CC-150 Polaris
- Airbus A330 MRTT
- Northrop Grumman KC-45

Aircraft of comparable role, configuration, and era

- Boeing KC-767
- Boeing KC-46 Pegasus

Related lists

- List of military transport aircraft
- List of tanker aircraft
