= Vickers-Armstrongs =

British former engineering company

Vickers-Armstrongs Limited
- Industry: Manufacture of basic iron and steel and of ferro-alloys Manufacture of military fighting vehicles arms industry building of ships and floating structures metal industry vehicle construction
- Predecessor: Vickers
- Founded: 1927
- Defunct: 1977
- Fate: Assets split and majority nationalised
- Successor: Vickers plc British Aircraft Corporation (est. 1960); British Shipbuilders; British Steel Corporation
- Headquarters: Vickers House, Westminster, London
- Key people: George Edwards; Rex Pierson
- Parent: Vickers Limited; Armstrong Whitworth
- Subsidiaries: Metropolitan-Vickers; Canadian Vickers; Whitehead & Company; John Brown & Company; Sociedad Española de Construcción Naval; Supermarine Aviation Works (est. 1928)

Vickers-Armstrongs Limited was a British engineering conglomerate formed by the merger of the assets of Vickers Limited and Sir W G Armstrong Whitworth & Company in 1927. The majority of the company was nationalised in the 1960s and 1970s, with the remainder being divested as Vickers plc in 1977.

It featured among Britain's most prominent armaments firms.

== History ==
Vickers merged with the Tyneside-based engineering company Armstrong Whitworth, founded by William Armstrong, to become Vickers-Armstrongs. Armstrong Whitworth and Vickers had developed along similar lines, expanding into various military sectors and produced a whole suite of military products. Armstrong Whitworth were notable for their artillery manufacture at Elswick and shipbuilding at a yard at High Walker on the River Tyne.

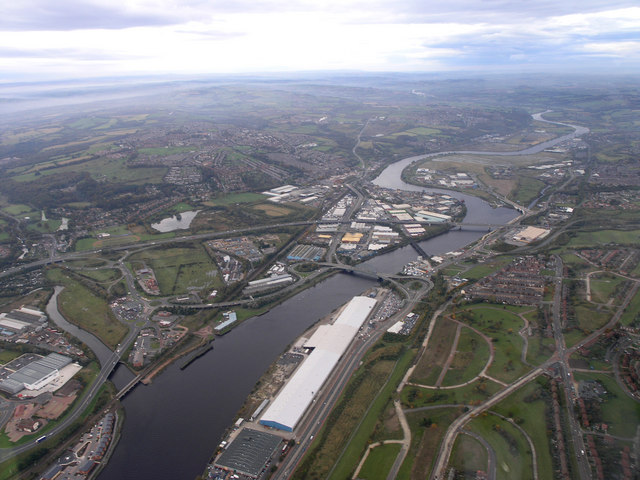
Vickers-Armstrongs Works in Scotswood

1929 saw the merger of the acquired railway business with those of Cammell Laird to form Metropolitan Cammell Carriage and Wagon (MCCW); Metro Cammell.

In 1935, before rearmament began, Vickers-Armstrongs was the third-largest manufacturing employer in Britain, behind Unilever and ICI.

In 1956 Dorothy Hatfield became the first female engineering apprentice at Vickers-Armstrongs (Aircraft), Brooklands, followed in 1958 by Janet Gulland who was the first female graduate apprentice at the company.

=== Break-up ===
In 1960 the aircraft interests were merged with those of Bristol, English Electric and Hunting Aircraft to form the British Aircraft Corporation (BAC). This was owned by Vickers, English Electric and Bristol (holding 40%, 40% and 20% respectively). BAC in turn owned 70% of Hunting. The Supermarine operation was closed in 1963 and the Vickers brand name for aircraft was dropped by BAC in 1965. Under the terms of the Aircraft and Shipbuilding Industries Act 1977 BAC was nationalised to become part of British Aerospace (later BAE Systems).

The Aircraft and Shipbuilding Industries Act also led to the nationalisation of Vickers' shipbuilding division as part of British Shipbuilders. This division was privatised as Vickers Shipbuilding & Engineering in 1986, later passing to GEC as part of Marconi Marine and survives to this day as part of BAE Systems Submarines.

Vickers Container and Packaging Machinery Division, including the Vickers Stitcher and Vickers Hardness Machine business, was bought by Fords Industrial Products, part of Barry Wehmiller in 1986. In 1991 the Vickers Hardness Machinery business was bought by the then field engineers, and continues today as UK Calibrations Limited based in Kidderminster. The Vickers Stitcher was still being manufactured in India as recently as 2005.

The steelmaking division became part of British Steel Corporation and the remaining interests were divested as the public company Vickers plc, whose various components were later split. The Vickers name ceased to exist in 2003 when Rolls-Royce renamed its acquisition Vinters Engineering.

== Businesses ==
=== Armaments ===
Vickers-Armstrongs inherited the Vickers machine gun of 1912 used in World War I from Vickers Limited. There were other Vickers machine guns aside from the regular water-cooled model (known universally as the "Vickers"): the Vickers-Berthier (VB) machine gun used by the Indian Army, the Vickers "K" .303 aircraft machine gun developed from it, and the Vickers "S" 40 mm aircraft gun. An unusual machine gun also made was the Vickers Higson.

Vickers produced larger weapons such as the Ordnance QF 2-pounder gun used on tanks. In 1948 Vickers bought the Australian business of Charles Ruwolt Ltd for £750,000 following Ruwolt's death in 1946. During World War II Ruwolt's firm produced armaments for the Australian Government, including field artillery such as mortars and howitzer cannon.

=== Shipbuilding ===
After the 1927 merger, the company possessed a major yard on each coast of Britain; the Naval Construction Yard of Vickers at Barrow-in-Furness in Cumbria and the Naval Yard of Armstrong Whitworth at High Walker on the River Tyne. Vickers-Armstrongs was one of the most important warship manufacturers in the world. These interests were renamed as Vickers-Armstrongs Shipbuilders in 1955, changing again to Vickers Limited Shipbuilding Group in 1968. The Barrow yard was nationalised and became part of British Shipbuilders in 1977, was privatised as VSEL in 1986 and remains in operation to this day as BAE Systems Submarines. Meanwhile, the Naval Yard at High Walker on the River Tyne passed to Swan Hunter in 1968, was nationalised and became part of British Shipbuilders in 1977, was privatised still as Swan Hunter in 1986 but closed down during the 1980s.

Vickers-Armstrongs also built the VA-3 hovercraft.

=== Military vehicles ===
The company was also known for its tank designs, starting with the widely used Vickers 6-Ton. It also produced the influential, if never actually produced, Independent A1E1 tank. One of the company's most important designs was the Valentine Infantry Tank, produced in the thousands in World War II. The military vehicle manufacturing interests were divested into Vickers plc, and would later pass to Alvis Vickers, now part of BAE Systems Land and Armaments.

Notable Vickers-Armstrongs military vehicles include;

- Carden Loyd tankette
- Cruiser Mk I
- Cruiser Mk II
- Vickers 6-ton
- Light Tank Mk VI
- Valentine
- Vickers MBT (and under licence in India as Vijayanta)

=== Aviation ===
Vickers formed its Aviation Department in 1911. The aircraft interests of Armstrong Whitworth were not acquired in the merger and later passed to the Hawker Aircraft group. In 1928 the Aviation Department became Vickers (Aviation) Ltd and soon after acquired Supermarine Aviation Works, which became the Supermarine Aviation Works (Vickers) Ltd and was responsible for producing the revolutionary Spitfire fighter.

In 1938, both companies were re-organised as Vickers-Armstrongs (Aircraft) Ltd. A new 'art deco' headquarters designed by architect C. Howard Crane was built at its Brooklands factory in Surrey. The former Supermarine and Vickers works continued to brand their products under their former names.

In 1960 the aircraft interests were one of the founding companies merged to form BAC. In 1966, the hovercraft activities of Vickers-Armstrongs were merged with those of the Westland Aircraft company, including those of Saunders-Roe, to form the British Hovercraft Corporation, with Vickers holding 25% of the new company. In 1970, Westland bought out Vickers interest along with other partners.

Vickers formed a subsidiary, the Airship Guarantee Company, under the direction of Cdr Dennis Burney solely for the purpose of producing the R100 airship for the government.

Between 1911 and 1970, just over 16,000 aircraft were built under the Vickers name; together the 11,462 Wellington and 846 Warwick aircraft (which were structurally similar) make up over 75% of this total.

==== Military aircraft ====
Vickers became renowned as a manufacturer of large aircraft at its main factory at Brooklands in Surrey. In the interwar period, the company produced the Wellesley, designed by Rex Pierson using the geodetic airframe principle of structural engineer Barnes Wallis. This would later evolve into the famous Wellington bomber, a mainstay of RAF Bomber Command and RAF Coastal Command during World War II. The Cold War-era Valiant V bomber was another Vickers product.

Military aircraft with the Vickers brand:

- Vickers R.E.P. Type Monoplane
- Vickers E.F.B.1
- Vickers F.B.5
- Vickers E.S.1
- Vickers E.F.B.7
- Vickers E.F.B.8
- Vickers F.B.11
- Vickers F.B.12
- Vickers F.B.14
- Vickers F.B.16
- Vickers F.B.19
- Vickers F.B.24
- Vickers F.B.25
- Vickers Vampire
- Vickers Vimy
- Vickers VIM
- Vickers Viking
- Vickers Vagabond
- Vickers Vendace
- Vickers Vixen
- Vickers Viget
- Vickers Valparaiso
- Vickers Venture
- Vickers Type 131 Valiant
- Vickers Type 123
- Vickers Type 141
- Vickers Type 143 – a.k.a. Bolivian Scout
- Vickers Jockey
- Vickers Type 161
- Vickers Type 163
- Vickers Type 177
- Vickers Vespa
- Type 121 Wibault Scout
- Vickers Vireo
- Vickers Vellore
- Vickers Virginia
- Vickers Vanox
- Vickers Valentia – 1918 flying boat
- Vickers Type 264 Valentia – 1934 cargo aircraft
- Vickers Vernon
- Vickers Victoria
- Vickers Vildebeest
- Vickers Vincent
- Vickers Type 207
- Vickers Type 253
- Vickers Wellesley
- Vickers Venom
- Vickers Wellington
- Vickers Wellington LN514
- Vickers Warwick
- Vickers Type 432 – WWII high altitude interceptor
- Vickers Windsor
- Vickers Valetta
- Vickers Varsity
- Vickers Valiant

Vickers also competed for contracts with designs such as:

- Victory Bomber
- Vickers Type 559 – 1950s high altitude supersonic interceptor
- Vickers Type 010 Swallow – 1950s supersonic interceptor
- Vickers Type 581 - 1950s swing-wing bomber project

==== Vickers Canada ====
- Canadian Vickers Vancouver
- Canadian Vickers Vanessa
- Canadian Vickers Varuna
- Canadian Vickers Vedette
- Canadian Vickers Velos
- Canadian Vickers Vigil
- Canadian Vickers Vista

==== Missiles and other weapons ====
- "Upkeep" and "Highball" bouncing bombs
- Tallboy bomb
- Grand Slam bomb
- UB.109T – Company designation was Vickers 825.
- Blue Boar – Air-to Surface television-guided glider bomb from the 1950s.
- Green lizard – Surface-to-air missile project from the 1950s.
- Orange William – Anti-tank missile project from the late 1950s.
- Red Dean – Air-to-air missile project.
- Red Hebe – Air-to-air missile project.
- Vickers Vigilant
- R.A.E. - Vickers Transonic Research Rocket

==== Civilian aircraft ====
Vickers was a pioneer in producing airliners, early examples being converted from Vimy bombers. Post-WWII, Vickers went on to manufacture the piston-engined Vickers VC.1 Viking airliner, the Viscount and Vanguard turboprop airliners and (as part of BAC) the VC10 jet airliner, which was used in RAF service as an aerial refuelling tanker until 2013.

- Vickers Vimy Commercial
- Vickers Vulcan (1920s)
- Vickers Type 170 Vanguard (1923)
- Vickers Viastra
- Vickers Vellox
- Vickers VC.1 Viking
- Vickers Viscount
  - Vickers Viscount variants
- Vickers Vanguard
- Vickers V-1000 – not completed
- Vickers VC10

=== Marine engines ===
Vickers-Armstrongs was one of the few British manufacturers of marine diesel engines, notably for Royal Navy S, T-class and Estonian Kalev-class submarines during World War II.

=== Civilian Target and Sporting Rifles ===
After the Great War Vickers needed to diversify when the military contracts ended. Between WWI and the Second World War they introduced ranges of target and sporting rifles and shotguns, the most successful of which were their small-bore .22 rimfire target rifles. These were serious competitors to the Birmingham Small Arms equivalent products, and Vickers .22 target rifles were at the top of the major competitions' results for more than a decade. Initially these rifles were named solely for Vickers, but, after the 1927 amalgamation with Armstrongs, they became Vickers Armstrongs' products. See reference Vickers and Vickers-Armstrongs Martini target rifles and Sporting guns

== In fiction ==
- In The Adventures of Tintin comic The Broken Ear, the role of Vickers-Armstrongs in the Chaco War is parodied as "Viking Arms Co. Limited", with their salesman Basil Zaharoff selling cannon and ordnance to both warring countries.
- A handgun described in a trial of Walter Mitty's alter ego is a .50 caliber Webley-Vickers revolver.

== See also ==
- Aerospace industry in the United Kingdom
- Basil Zaharoff

== Bibliography ==
- Andrews, C.F.; Morgan, E.B (1995). Vickers Aircraft since 1908. Putnam.
- Johnston, Ian; Buxton, Ian (2013). The Battleship Builders – Constructing and Arming British Capital Ships (Hardback). Annapolis, Maryland: Naval Institute Press. ISBN 978-1-59114-027-6.
- Lynch, Brendan. Yesterday We Were in America - Alcock and Brown - First to fly the Atlantic non-stop. Yeovil, England: Haynes Publishing, 2009 ISBN 978 1 84425 681 5
- Scott, J.D. (1962). Vickers: A History. London: Weidenfeld & Nicolson.
