= Canadian Vickers Vancouver =

Vancouver
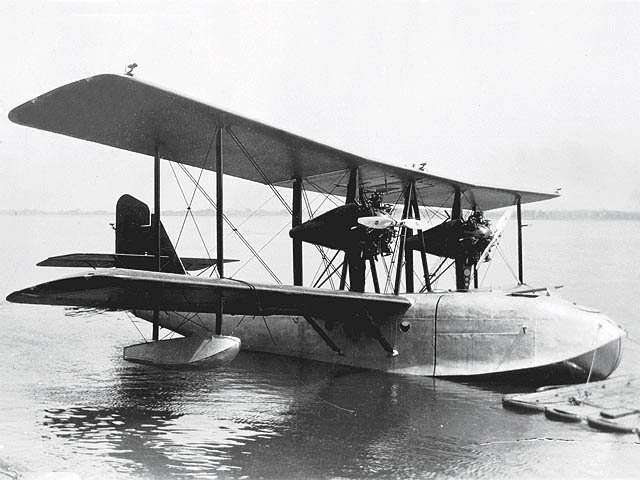

General information
- Type: Transport/patrol flying boat
- Manufacturer: Canadian Vickers
- Status: out of service, cancelled
- Primary user: RCAF

History
- Manufactured: 6
- First flight: 1929
- Retired: 1940

The Canadian Vickers Vancouver was a Canadian transport/patrol flying boat of the 1930s built by Canadian Vickers.

It was a twin-engine, equal-span biplane. The hull was of metal and the rest of the structure of fabric-covered wood.

== Development ==
The Vancouver was developed as a replacement for the Varuna in response to a Royal Canadian Air Force requirement for a flying boat to transport men and equipment to forest fires. The main difference from the Varuna was a duralumin hull and more powerful engines. The two flight crew were located in two tandem open cockpits, forward of the wing. The main cabin could accommodate a firefighting team of six men and all the required equipment. Five aircraft were delivered to the Royal Canadian Air Force, one was later converted into a coastal patrol aircraft.

== Operational history ==
In the mid-1930s, the Vancouvers were modified as coastal patrol aircraft by the installation of machine guns and bombs.

After the outbreak of the Second World War, Vancouvers served with 4 Squadron, RCAF at Jericho Beach Air Station until withdrawn from service in 1940. After a brief period of service in training duties, they were finally withdrawn and struck off in 1940.

None of the aircraft saw service after 1940, one private offer to acquire was denied.

== Variants ==
Data from:Canadian Aircraft since 1909

- Vancouver I – prototype with Armstrong Siddeley Lynx IV engines, one built.
- Vancouver IA – designation of prototype after installation of Armstrong Siddeley Lynx IVC engines.
- Vancouver II – production transport version with Armstrong Siddeley Lynx IVC (three aircraft) or Wright J-6 Whirlwind (two aircraft) engines, five built.
- Vancouver IIS/S – conversion of three Lynx-powered Vancouver IIs to "service standard" with three Lewis gun cockpits for coastal patrol, powered by Armstrong Siddeley Serval IV engines.
- Vancouver IIS/W – "service standard" conversion of two Wright J-6 Whirlwind powered Vancouver IIs.

== Operator ==
Canada
Royal Canadian Air Force

  - No. 4 Squadron RCAF 1939-1940

== Specifications (Vancouver IIS/W) ==
Data from Canadian aircraft since 1909, Jane's all the World's Aircraft 1931

General characteristics

- Crew: 9 (2 crew in civil versions)
- Capacity: (7 pax in civil versions)
- Length: 37 ft 6 in (11.43 m)
- Wingspan: 55 ft 0 in (16.76 m)
- Height: 15 ft 7 in (4.75 m)
- Wing area: 772 sq ft (71.7 m^{2})
- Airfoil: Clark Y
- Empty weight: 5,159 lb (2,340 kg)
- Gross weight: 7,606 lb (3,450 kg)
- Powerplant: 2 × Wright J-6 Whirlwind 9-cyl. air-cooled radial piston engine, 300 hp (220 kW) each
- Propellers: 2-bladed Standard steel fixed-pitch propellers

Performance

- Maximum speed: 94 mph (151 km/h, 82 kn)
- Cruise speed: 86 mph (138 km/h, 75 kn) *Alighting speed: 45 mph (39 kn; 72 km/h)
- Service ceiling: 15,000 ft (4,600 m) plus
- Rate of climb: 565 ft/min (2.87 m/s)

Armament

- Guns: 3 x 0.303 in (7.70 mm) Lewis Guns (military Vancouvers only)
- Bombs: 1,000 lb (450 kg) of bombs (military Vancouvers only)

== See also ==
Related lists

- List of aircraft of World War II
- List of flying boats and floatplanes
- List of interwar military aircraft
