= Canadian Vickers =

Aircraft and shipbuilding company that operated in Canada

Canadian Vickers Limited
- Industry: Shipbuilding, Aircraft
- Founded: 8 June 1911
- Defunct: 29 December 1994
- Headquarters: Montreal, Quebec, Canada
- Parent: Vickers Limited

Canadian Vickers Limited was an aircraft and shipbuilding company that operated in Canada from 1911 until 1944. A subsidiary of Vickers Limited, it built its own aircraft designs as well as others under licence. Canadair absorbed the Canadian Vickers aircraft operations in November 1944.

== Shipbuilding ==
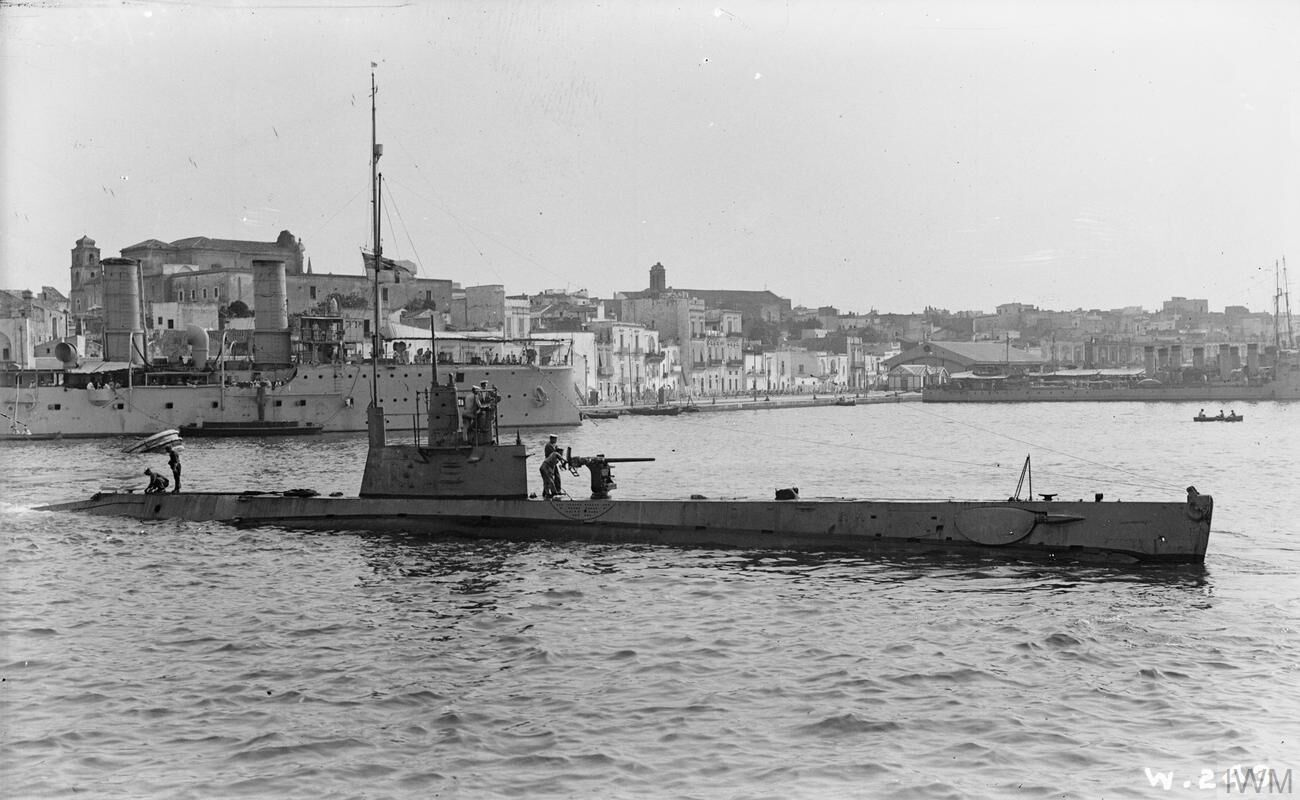
British H-class submarine HMS H4 at Brindisi in August 1916

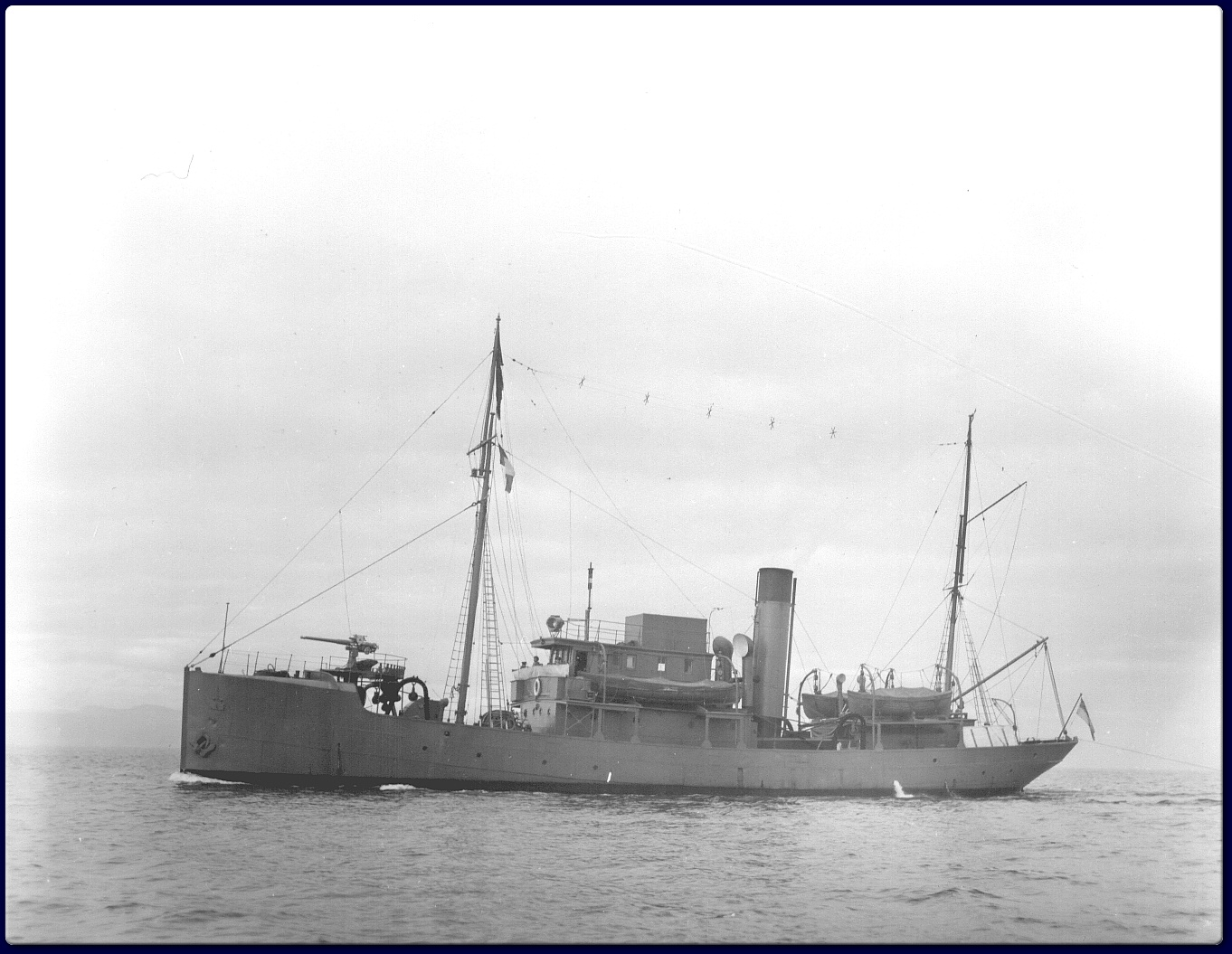
Battle-class trawler HMCS Armentières

In 1907, British shipbuilding and weapons manufacturing conglomerate Vickers Sons & Maxim began investigating possible locations for a shipyard in Montreal. Vickers Sons & Maxim intended to use the shipyard as a repair facility for transatlantic shipping traffic entering Montreal. Vickers Sons & Maxim was invited by the Government of Canada in 1911 to establish a Canadian division to manufacture vessels for the nascent Royal Canadian Navy. According to naval historian Marc Milner, "the Harbour Commission and the city of Maisonneuve offered Vickers a first-class location" to establish the yard, and "an extended lease on the land and deferred taxes." Vickers Sons & Maxim established Canadian Vickers in June 1911 and constructed the shipyard between Rue Notre-Dame and rue Viau along the Saint Lawrence River (now Viterra Montreal Terminal). Canadian Vickers ordered the construction of a large floating drydock, which was opened in 1912. Due to the establishment of Canadian Vickers, Montreal became one of Canada's leading shipbuilding centres. The shipyard's first full year of operation was 1914, a year marked by the beginning of World War I.

During World War I the yard assembled American-designed Holland 602 type submarines on behalf of the Royal Navy. The hulls were Canadian-built, but the machinery and equipment were American. They were known as the British H-class submarine in the Royal Navy and were the first submarines to cross the Atlantic Ocean under their own power. Canadian Vickers (along with Polson Iron Works of Toronto) also constructed the first vessels specifically designed for the Royal Canadian Navy, the Battle-class naval trawlers.

- H1 – Launched May 1915
- H2 – Launched June 1915
- H3 – Launched June 1915. Mined and sunk July 1916
- H4 – Launched June 1915
- H5 – Launched June 1915. Rammed and sunk March 1918
- H6 – Launched June 1915. Interned and purchased by the Dutch January 1916
- H7 – Launched June 1915
- H8 – Launched June 1915
- H9 – Launched June 1915
- H10 – Launched June 1915. Disappeared 1918

This shipyard would go on to produce many civilian and military ships in Canada, including:

- River-class frigates for the Canadian, British, and US navies.
- Flower-class corvettes for the Canadian, British, and US navies.
- St. Laurent-class destroyer
  - HMCS St. Laurent (DDH 205)
  - HMCS Ottawa (DDH 229)
- Restigouche-class destroyer
  - HMCS Restigouche (DDE 257)
- Mackenzie-class destroyer
  - HMCS Mackenzie (DDE 261)
- Canadian Coast Guard icebreakers
  - CCGS Louis S. St-Laurent
  - CCGS Simcoe
  - Algogulf a laker launched in 1961 and scrapped in 2002
- floating drydock General Georges P Vanier in 1964 and renamed as Scotia Dock II by Halifax Shipyard; damaged and scrapped 2010.

Canadian Vickers also manufactured luxury yachts and vessels that were later converted as yachts:

- Bart Roberts – built in 1963 as icebreaker and converted as a yacht in 2001
- Club Atlantic – motor yacht built in 1967
- Christina O – built in 1943 as HMCS Stormont (K327) and converted as yacht in 1954; renamed as Christina in 1954, Argo in 1978 and current named in 1998

Following World War I, labour militancy grew within Quebec. In June 1919, Canadian Vickers workers led labour action in Montreal as part of larger strike actions within the shipbuilding industry. The labour strike was a result of demands for maximum 8-hour shifts. Employees of Canadian Vickers coordinated with other work forces in Montreal, though shortly after it began, disagreements over a general strike led the labour action to falter. The end of the First World War also saw a reduction of shipping orders and increased competition among shipbuilders. This led to consolidation among shipyards and Canadian Vickers' parent company, Vickers merged with Armstrong Whitworth to form Vickers-Armstrongs. In 1926, Frank Ross of Montreal Dry Dock and two business partners sought to acquire Canadian Vickers from its parent company. Negotiations began in March and were agreed to in November. In 1928, Ross merged Montreal Dry Dock with Canadian Vickers. During the 1930s, the yard survived the Great Depression with repair contracts and constructing manufacturing turbines and structural steel.

The shipyard was reacquired by Vickers in 1956. It was renamed Vickers Canada Limited in 1978 after being sold to Canadian interests and renamed several times again by the last owners Marine Industries, eventually (as Versatile Vickers Inc in 1981 and MIL Vickers in 1987). Shipbuilding operations ceased by 1988.

== Aerospace ==
Canadian Vickers ventured into aircraft manufacturing in 1923 when it won a contract to supply Vickers Viking flying boats to the recently formed Canadian Air Force (Royal Canadian Air Force from 1924). Between 1923 and 1944, Canadian Vickers produced over 400 aircraft, some of which were original Vickers' designs while the remainder were other manufacturers' designs built under licence.

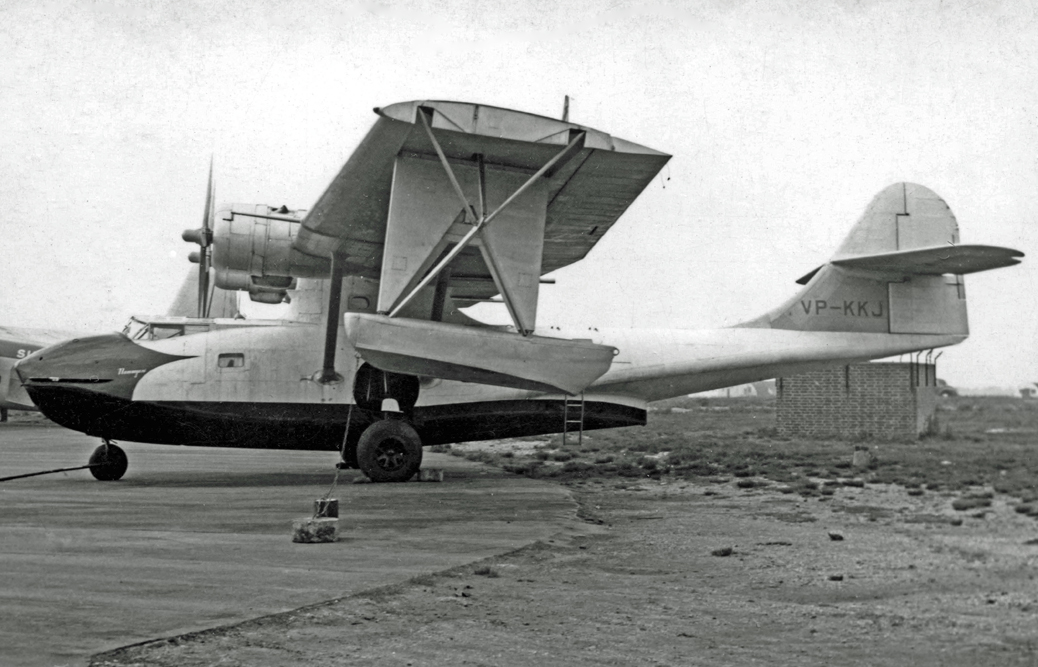
This Canadian Vickers OA-10A operated in several countries postwar as a utility transport, including Hong Kong, Sweden and Kenya

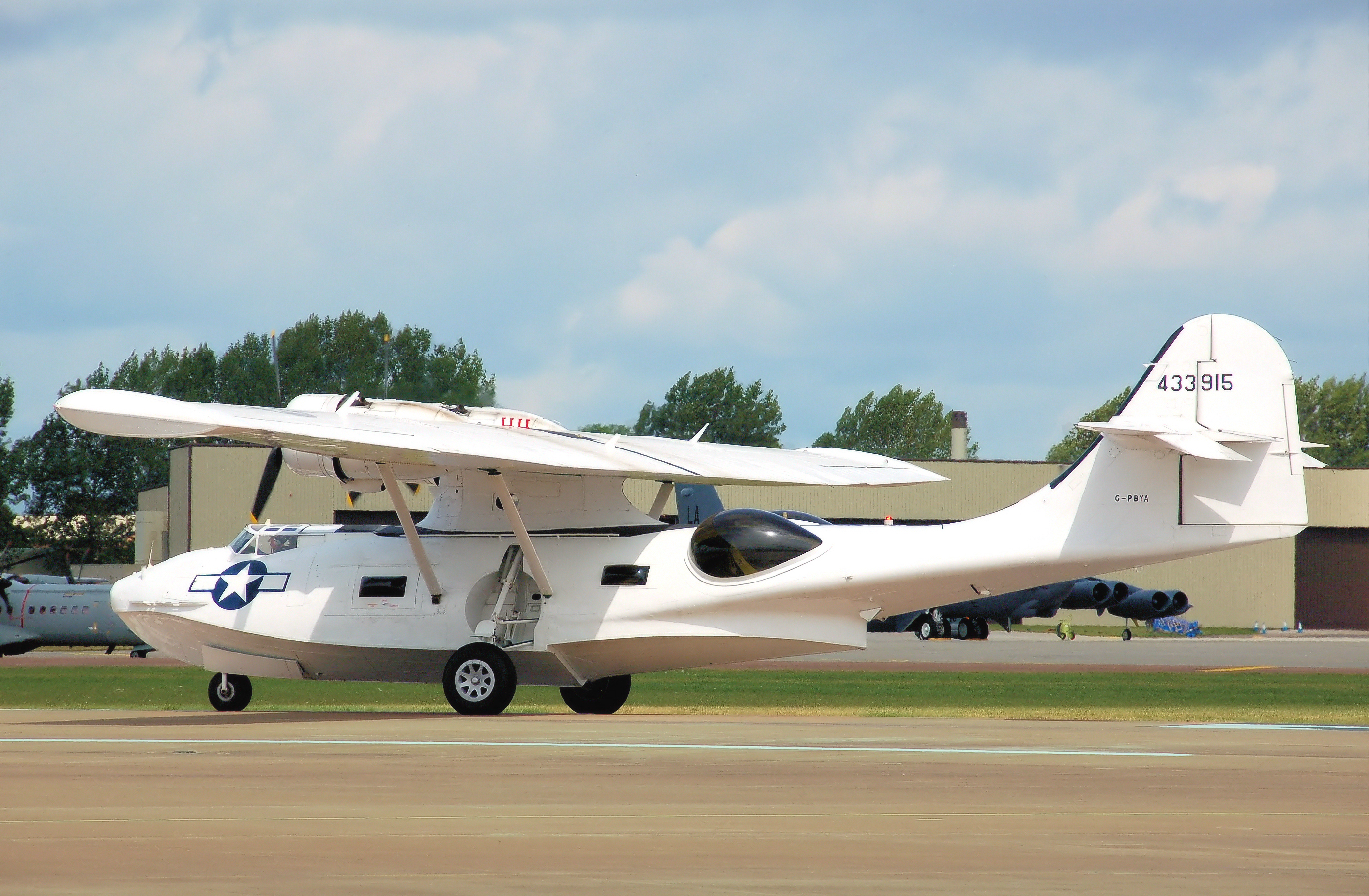
Canadian Vickers PBV-1A Canso A at the Royal International Air Tattoo, England in 2009. A version of the PBY-5A Catalina, this aircraft was built in 1944 for the Royal Canadian Air Force

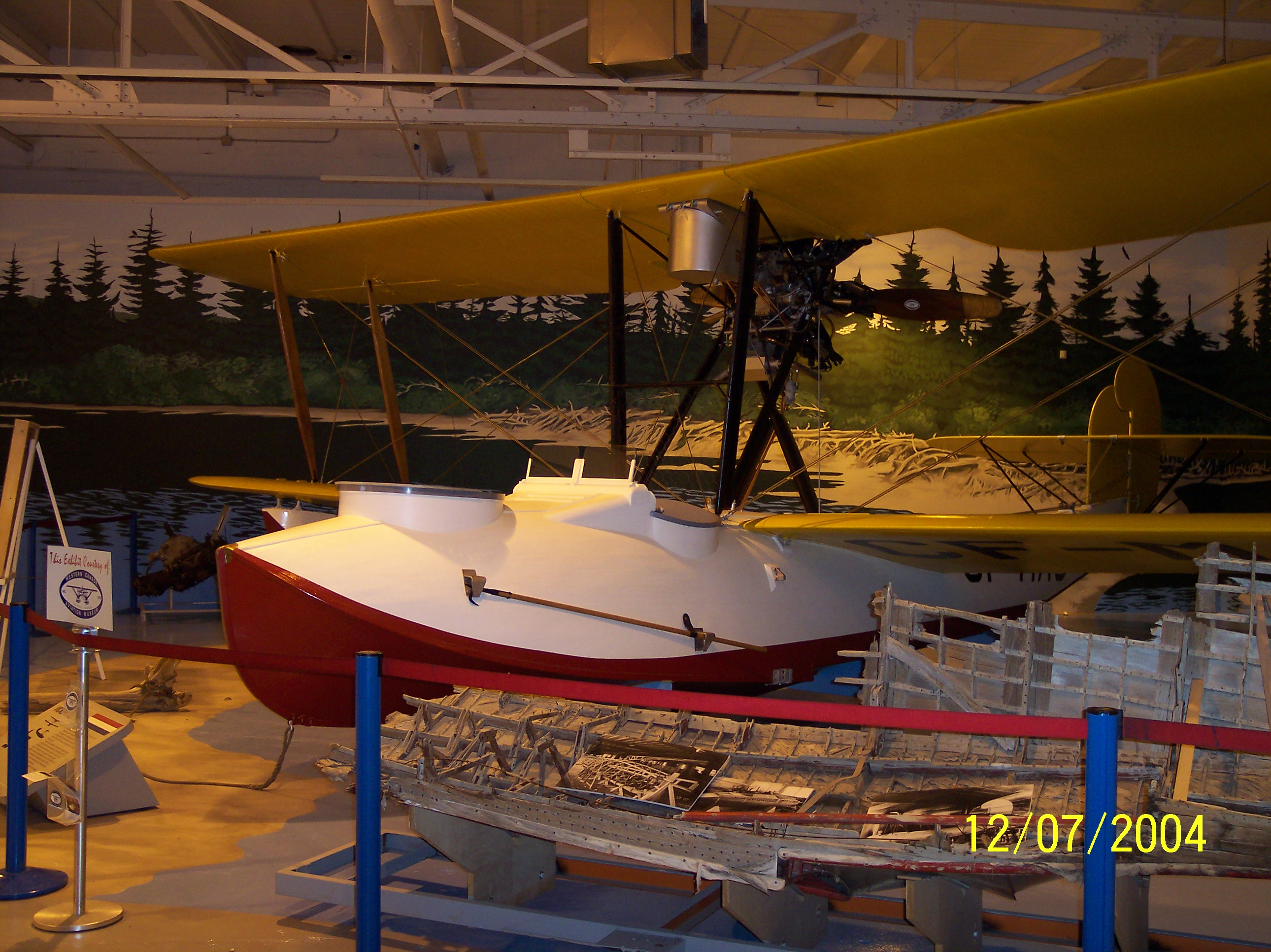
A Vickers Vedette replica at the Western Canada Aviation Museum, Winnipeg, Manitoba

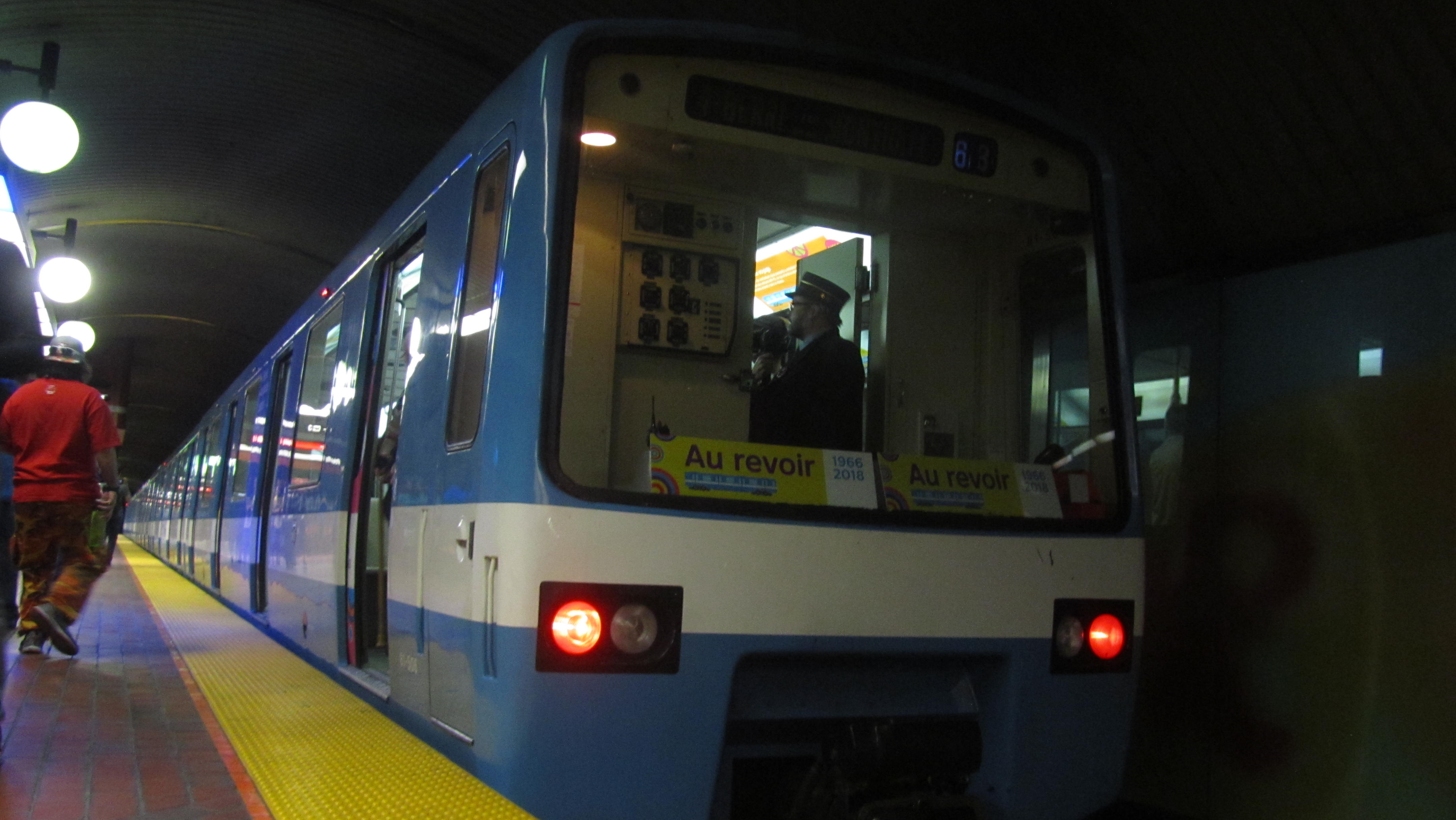
A Canadian Vickers MR-63 car on its last day in service on the Montreal Metro.

In July 1941, the Canadian government awarded Canadian Vickers a contract to produce PBV-1 "Canso" amphibians (a version of the Consolidated PBY Catalina flying boat) for the Royal Canadian Air Force. Many of the aircraft were delivered to the United States Navy as the PBV-1; also to the United States Army Air Forces as the OA-10A for rescue work.

To speed Canso production, the government authorized construction of a new manufacturing facility at Cartierville Airport in Ville Saint Laurent, on the north-western outskirts of Montreal, and appointed Canadian Vickers to manage the plant's operation on the government's behalf. Independently Boeing also produced Catalinas in Canada.

In 1944, business pressure compelled Canadian Vickers to ask the government to relieve it of its management responsibilities regarding the Cartierville plant. Ottawa agreed and entered into a management contract with Canadair, a new company founded by a small group of former senior Canadian Vickers personnel headed by Benjamin W. Franklin (no relation to his famous namesake). On 4 November 1944, Canadair took over operation of the plant. In September 1946, Canadair and the plant were acquired by the Electric Boat Company of Groton, Connecticut.

In 1952, Electric Boat bought Consolidated Vultee and combined it, Canadair, and several smaller companies to form General Dynamics Corporation. General Dynamics later became one of the largest U.S. aerospace corporations. Canadair remained a General Dynamics subsidiary until January 1976 when it was re-acquired by the Canadian government.

In December 1986, the government again sold Canadair, this time to Bombardier, a Quebec-based international conglomerate. Today, Canadair itself no longer exists as a separate entity having been absorbed into Bombardier Aviation.

=== Canadian Vickers aircraft designs ===
- Canadian Vickers Vancouver (six built)
- Canadian Vickers Vanessa (one built)
- Canadian Vickers Varuna (eight built)
- Canadian Vickers Vedette (60 built)
- Canadian Vickers Velos (one built)
- Canadian Vickers Vigil (one built)
- Canadian Vickers Vista (one built)

=== License production ===
- Vickers Viking IV (six built)
- Avro 504N (13 built)
- Avro 552 (14 built)
- Curtiss HS-3L (three built)
- Fairchild FC-2 (11 built)
- Fokker Super Universal (15 built)
- Bellanca Pacemaker (six built)
- Northrop Delta (three Mk I and 17 Mk II built) (First all-metal stressed-skin aircraft built in Canada)
- Supermarine Stranraer (40 built)
- Canadian Vickers PBV-1 Canso (30 built at Vickers, 282 at Cartierville/Canadair plant)

=== Other aircraft work ===
- Fairey F-IIIC built for transatlantic attempt.
- Felixstowe F-III built for transatlantic attempt.
- Buhl Airsedan engineering work for Ontario Provincial Air Service.
- Handley Page Hampden component manufacture.
- R-100 airship repairs.

=== Unbuilt aircraft ===
- Canadian Vickers FV Hellcat – cancelled before any were built.

For aircraft built after 1944, those aircraft were built under the Canadair name.

== Railcars ==
Versatile Vickers used the Canadian former Vickers plant briefly to build rail cars in the 1960s and 1970s during the period of turmoil at the shipyard in Montreal. The rail car products were mostly built under contract, or licensed from other rail car builders or as joint production efforts (such as the MR-63 subway cars for the Montreal Metro with technical support from CIMT-Lorraine which also designed the rubber-tired system for some of the Paris Métro lines). In 1979 Vickers name was changed from Canadian Vickers Ltd. to Vickers Canada, Inc. following the purchase of its shares by the Canadian management from the British holding company. In 1981 the name was again changed to Versatile Vickers, Inc. Versatile Vickers went out of business in 1990.

1963–1967	MR-63 subway cars built for the Montreal Metro which opened in 1966, and were based on Alstom's MP 59 trains for the Paris Métro. Retired 2016–2018.
1969	Commuter Cab car (Bi-level "Town Car" coaches and gallery cars) built as a variant of the Pullman Company Gallery coaches for the Canadian Pacific Railways' Montreal suburban service; later re-classified as AMT 900 series cars. Rebuilt early 2000s and now retired.
1972–1977,	Car shells supplied by Canadian Vickers or the Budd Company for General Electric for Metropolitan Transportation Authority and Connecticut Department of Transportation M2 railcars. All cars were retired in 2018.
1980	PATCO II railcars were manufactured by Canadian Vickers under a licence from the Budd Company for the Port Authority Transit Corporation. All cars rebuilt by Alstom between 2013-2019.

== See also ==
- History of aviation in Canada

== Archives ==
There is a Canadian Vickers fonds at Library and Archives Canada. Archival reference number is R3819.
