= Avro Avocet =

1927 British prototype fighter aircraft

Avocet
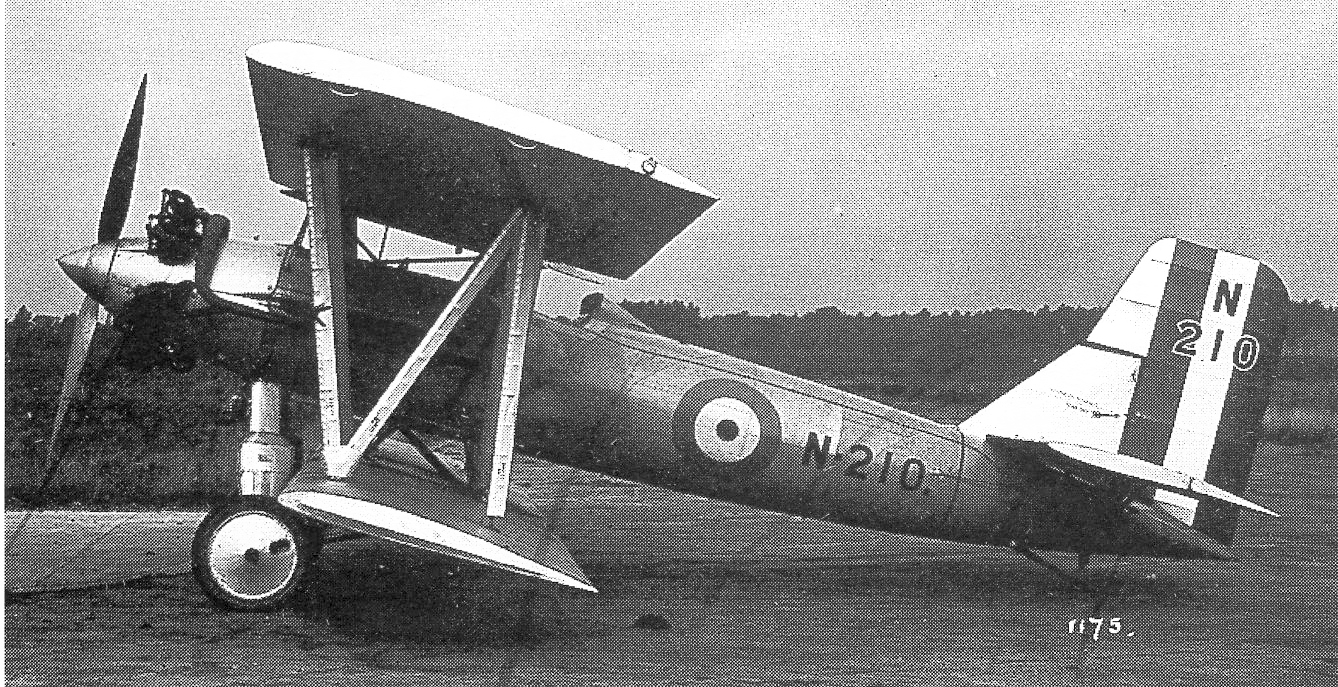

General information
- Type: Fighter
- Manufacturer: Avro
- Designer: Roy Chadwick
- Status: Prototype
- Primary user: Royal Air Force
- Number built: Two

History
- First flight: December 1927

The Avro Type 584 Avocet was a British single-engined naval fighter prototype, designed and built by Avro. While the Avocet was not built in numbers, one of the prototypes was used as a seaplane trainer for the Royal Air Force's (RAF) High Speed Flight.

== Design and development ==
The Avro 584 Avocet was designed by Avro's chief designer, Roy Chadwick to meet the requirements of Specification 17/25 for a Naval fighter. It was a single-engined, all-metal biplane, powered by a 230 hp Armstrong Siddeley Lynx engine, having interchangeable wheels and floats. Although it did not have folding wings, it was designed to be easily dismantled for storage on board ship.

Two prototypes were built, the first flying as a landplane in December 1927 and the second prototype flying as a seaplane in April 1928. Both prototypes were evaluated for the Fleet Air Arm at RAF Martlesham Heath, where, owing to the low-powered engine, their performance was seen to be unimpressive, and it was not ordered into production.

== Operational history ==
Although no production occurred, the second prototype was used by the RAF's High Speed Flight at Calshot as a seaplane trainer for Schneider Trophy pilots.

== Operators ==
United Kingdom

- Royal Air Force
  - High Speed Flight RAF

== Specifications (Avocet (Wheeled undercarriage)) ==
Data from The British Fighter since 1912

General characteristics

- Crew: 1
- Length: 24 ft 6 in (7.47 m)
- Wingspan: 29 ft 0 in (8.84 m)
- Height: 11 ft 8.375 in (3.56553 m)
- Wing area: 308 sq ft (28.6 m^{2})
- Empty weight: 1,612 lb (731 kg)
- Gross weight: 2,495 lb (1,132 kg)
- Powerplant: 1 × Armstrong Siddeley Lynx IV 7-cylinder air-cooled radial piston engine, 230 hp (170 kW)
- Propellers: 2-bladed fixed-pitch propeller

Performance

- Maximum speed: 133 mph (214 km/h, 116 kn)
- Service ceiling: 23,000 ft (7,000 m)
- Wing loading: 8.1 lb/sq ft (40 kg/m^{2})
- Power/mass: 0.092 hp/lb (0.151 kW/kg)

Armament

- Guns: 2 × fixed .303 in (7.7 mm) Vickers machine guns

== See also ==
Aircraft of comparable role, configuration, and era

- Vickers Vireo
