= Algogulf =

History
- Name: J.N. McWatters (1961–1991); Scott Misener (1991–1994); Algogulf (1994–2002)
- Owner: Misener Shipping Company (1961–1994); Algoma Central (1994–2002)
- Port of registry: (Canada) Port Colborne, Ontario
- Builder: Canadian Vickers, Montreal
- Yard number: 276
- Launched: 15 October 1960
- Completed: June 1961
- In service: 1961
- Out of service: 1999
- Identification: IMO number: 5166847
- Fate: Broken up at Port Colborne, 2002

General characteristics
- Type: Lake freighter
- Tonnage: 17,592 GRT; 25,634 DWT
- Length: 222.5 m (730 ft 0 in) oa; 215.7 m (707 ft 8 in) pp
- Beam: 23.0 m (75 ft 6 in)
- Installed power: 9,000 hp (6,711 kW) steam turbine
- Propulsion: 1 × screw; Bow thruster
- Speed: 15 knots (28 km/h)

Algogulf was an lake freighter launched in 1961, laid-up in 1999, and scrapped in 2002. The ship began her career in 1961 as J.N. McWatters, the second vessel of that name operated by the Misener Shipping Company. The bulk carrier primarily transported grain and iron ore in the Saint Lawrence Seaway and Great Lakes. In 1991, the vessel was renamed Scott Misener by the company, the fourth of that name. In 1994, the ship was acquired by Algoma Central and renamed Algogulf, the second vessel of the name. The ship was laid up in 1999 and sold for scrapping in 2002.

== Description ==
The bulk carrier was one of six ships constructed to a similar design. The ship was 222.5 metres (730 ft 0 in) long overall and 215.7 metres (707 ft 8 in) between perpendiculars with a beam of 23.0 metres (75 ft 6 in). The ship had a gross register tonnage (GRT) of 17,592 tons and a deadweight tonnage (DWT) of 25,634 tons. The ship was powered by a 9,000-horsepower (6,711 kW) steam turbine driving one screw giving the vessel a maximum speed of 15 knots (28 km/h). The vessel was also equipped with a bow thruster. The ship was equipped with six holds fed by 22 hatches.

== Service history ==
The ship was constructed in two parts at the Canadian Vickers yard at Montreal, Quebec, Canada with the yard number 276 for the Misener Shipping Company. The aft part of the ship was launched on 15 October 1960, with the fore part launched on 29 April 1961. Construction of the vessel, named J.N. McWatters was completed in June 1961. The ship was registered at Port Colborne, Ontario.

After entering service, J.N. McWatters serviced ports along the Saint Lawrence Seaway and Great Lakes transporting mainly grain and iron ore cargoes. In 1991 when the Misener Shipping Company retired its third vessel named after Scott Misener, they renamed J.N. McWatters to become their fourth vessel to be named Scott Misener. The ship sailed under this name until 1992, when the vessel was taken out of service and laid up at Hamilton, Ontario.

In 1994 she was purchased by Algoma Central, who renamed the ship Algogulf, the second vessel of that name. In July 1994, the vessel was taken to Port Weller Dry Docks for a refit. While undergoing the work, the shipyard suffered a strike by its workers and the refit was not completed until March 1995. She was laid up at Hamilton, at the end of the 1999 shipping season. Over the next three years she had parts removed, as she remained at her moorings, in Hamilton. She was scrapped in Port Colborne in 2002. This was done as part of the fleet renewal as most steam-powered ships were scrapped or re-engined. Algogulf was one of the last of Algoma Central's lake freighters to be powered by steam turbines, after most vessels became powered by large diesel engines.

== Sources ==
- Bawal, Raymond A. Jr. (2009). Twilight of the Great Lakes Steamer. Clinton Township, Michigan: Inland Expressions. ISBN 978-0-9818157-2-5.
- Gillham, Skip (2005). The Ships of the Misener Fleet. Vineland, Ontario: Glenaden Press. ISBN 0-9737435-0-6.
- "J.N. McWatters (5166847)". Miramar Ship Index.
