= Fairchild FC-2 =

1926 American utility aircraft family

FC-1, FC-2, and Models 51 and 61
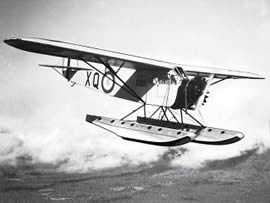
- RCAF FC-2L "Razorback"

General information
- Type: Civil utility aircraft
- Manufacturer: Fairchild
- Built by: Canadian Vickers (under license)
- Number built: c. 180

History
- First flight: 14 June 1926

The Fairchild FC-1 and its derivatives are a family of light, single-engine, high-wing utility monoplanes produced in the United States in the 1920s and 1930s. The aircraft was originally designed to provide a camera platform for Sherman Fairchild's aerial photography and survey business, Fairchild Aerial Surveys.

== Design and development ==
Fairchild had approached a number of aircraft builders with specifications for what he considered to be an ideal aircraft for this type of work, with which he hoped to replace the variety of types that his firm then operated. Believing the quotes he received to be excessive, Fairchild opted to produce the aircraft in-house, purchasing facilities at Farmingdale, New York for the purpose. The design was for a conventional high-wing, strut-braced monoplane with a fully enclosed cabin and tailwheel undercarriage. The wooden wings were able to be folded back against the tail for storage. To facilitate its intended role, the cabin was extensively glazed, offering plenty of vantage points for photographers.

The FC-1 was designed by Norman McQueen and Alex Klemin, featuring oleo and spring landing gear with foot activated brakes. Besides photography, the aircraft specifications include usage for carrying passengers, mail and advertising.

The prototype FC-1 flew in June 1926, and initial testing found its original Curtiss OX-5 engine to be inadequate. A Wright J-4 with double the horsepower was soon substituted and the aircraft was redesignated FC-1A. This was felt to have commercial potential, and in a slightly revised form, was put into production as the FC-2.

== Operational history ==
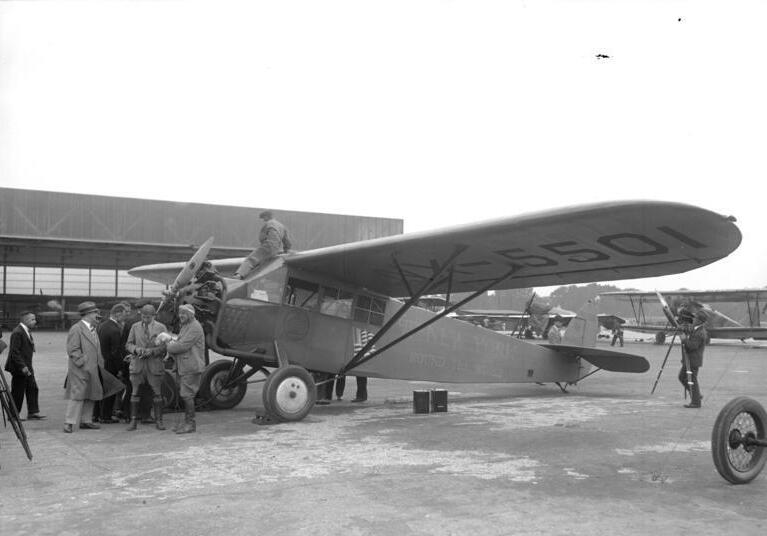
The FC-2W of Collyer and Mears at Berlin in 1928

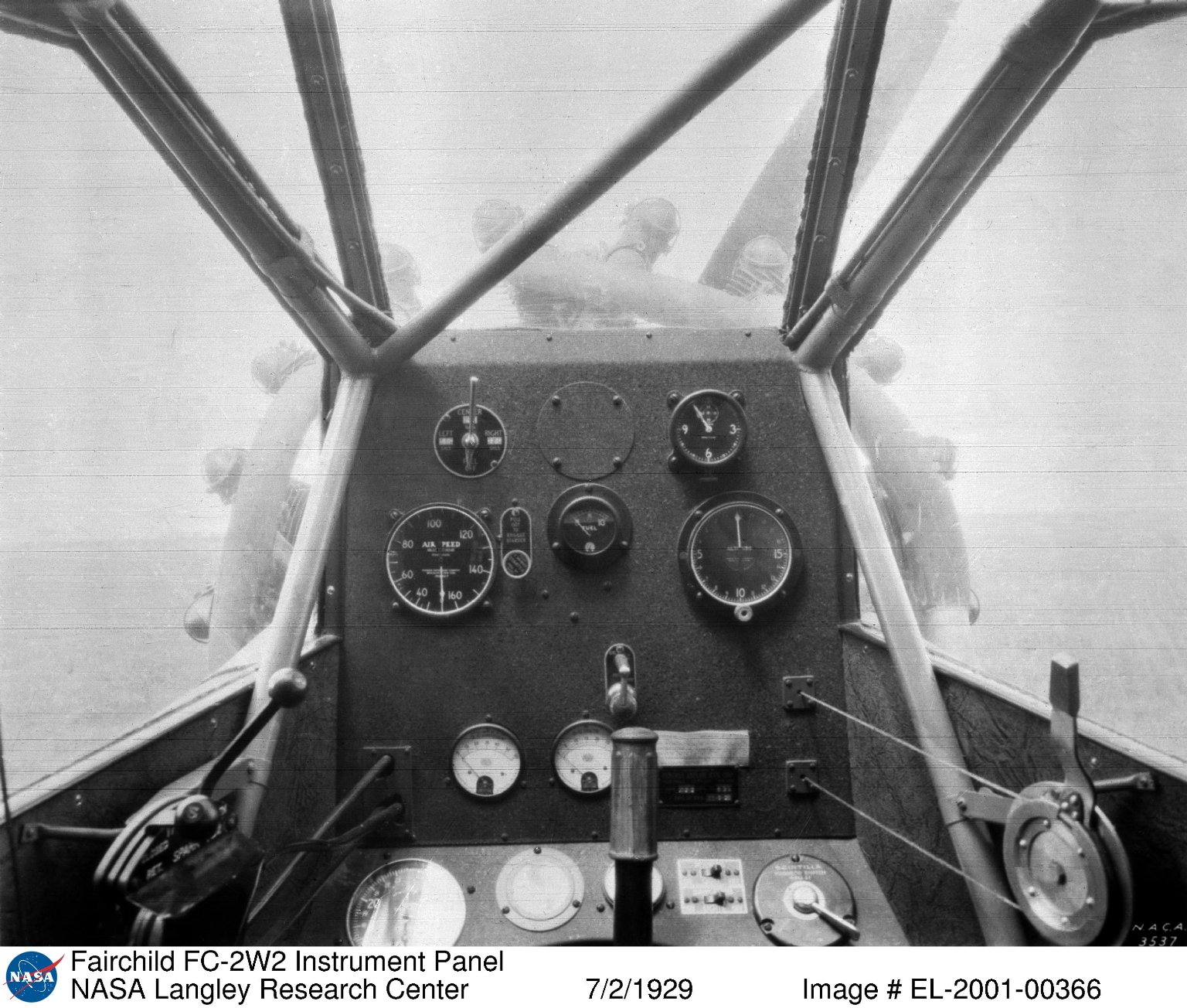
Cockpit view from an FC-2W2

The production aircraft differed from the prototype by having increased cabin volume, and was offered with a choice of powerplants. Other options included a choice of wheeled, ski, or float undercarriage. Early production aircraft fitted with only three longerons in the rear fuselage gave this batch of aircraft a "Razorback" appearance leading to its nickname. Later production series eliminated this distinctive feature. Designed with aerial photography in mind, the FC-2L featured an enclosed and heated cabin with extra windows to allow for an improved downward view. The Royal Canadian Air Force initially procured the type for this role, before utilizing the aircraft primarily as a light transport.

A version optimized for cargo carrying was produced as the FC-2W with a Pratt & Whitney Wasp radial engine and increased wingspan. Two of this latter version were destined for fame: City of New York, flown by Charles Collyer and John Mears for the overland portions of their record-breaking around-the-world trip in June–July 1928, and Stars and Stripes (Serial No. 140), an FC-2W2 taken by Richard Evelyn Byrd on his Antarctic expedition of the same year. Byrd's aircraft was preserved at the Virginia Aviation Museum, on loan from the National Air and Space Museum. When the Virginia Aviation Museum was closed in 2016, Stars and Stripes was moved to the National Air and Space Museum's Steven F. Udvar-Hazy Center in Chantilly, Virginia, where it is now on display.

FC-2Ws flown by Canadian bush pilots Duke Schiller and Romeo Vachon, the Canadian Transcontinental Airways Company's Chief Pilot, were also prominently used in the 1928 rescue of the crew of the aircraft Bremen in Canada.

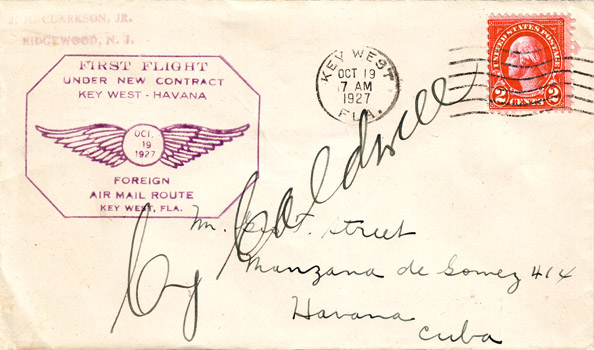
Cover carried in the Fairchild FC-2 "La Niña" on the first southbound flight of FAM-4

On 19 October 1927, an FC-2 configured as a floatplane made the first contract Air Mail flight operated by Pan American Airways. When unable to begin its service over Foreign Air Mail Route #4 (FAM-4) between Key West, Florida, and Havana, Cuba, on that date (as required under its contract) because heavy rains had delayed completion of the new runway at Key West needed to accommodate the company's Fokker F.VIIa/3m type tri-motor transports, PAA chartered (cost: $145.45) the FC-2 La Niña (NC-1654, c/n 15) piloted by Cy Caldwell and belonging to West Indian Aerial Express, a company which would be acquired by Pan Am a year later. (Note: Pan American was finally able to inaugurate daily service over the route nine days later with the Fokker F.VIIa/3m General Machado (NC-53).)

Due to a Royal Canadian Air Force requirement to standardize engines, the basic FC-2 design was re-engineered with a 215 hp Armstrong Siddeley Lynx radial engine and redesignated as the FC-2L. In this form, the type flew with RCAF units, primarily in northern operations. A further version for the RCAF, known as the FC-2V, was also developed.

The basic FC-2 design was further evolved into the model 51 and 71. The Model 51 was a modernized version of the FC-2 produced in 1930 to compete with new transports in the marketplace, the most significant single change being the fitting of a more powerful Wright J-6 engine again. A few examples were converted from FC-2s. The RCAF Model 51 aircraft had light bomb racks under the fuselage and were used for practice bombing at Camp Borden. The Model 61 also had the J-6 engine, but included a redesigned cabin to add another two passenger seats. Only three of these were built, modified from FC-2W2s, but the cabin modification was retained in the Model 71. The RCAF used the Model 71 as both a rugged, reliable and highly useful light transport and due to its camera bay for vertical photography and low rear-door windows to permit oblique photography, useful in the aerial survey role.

== Variants ==
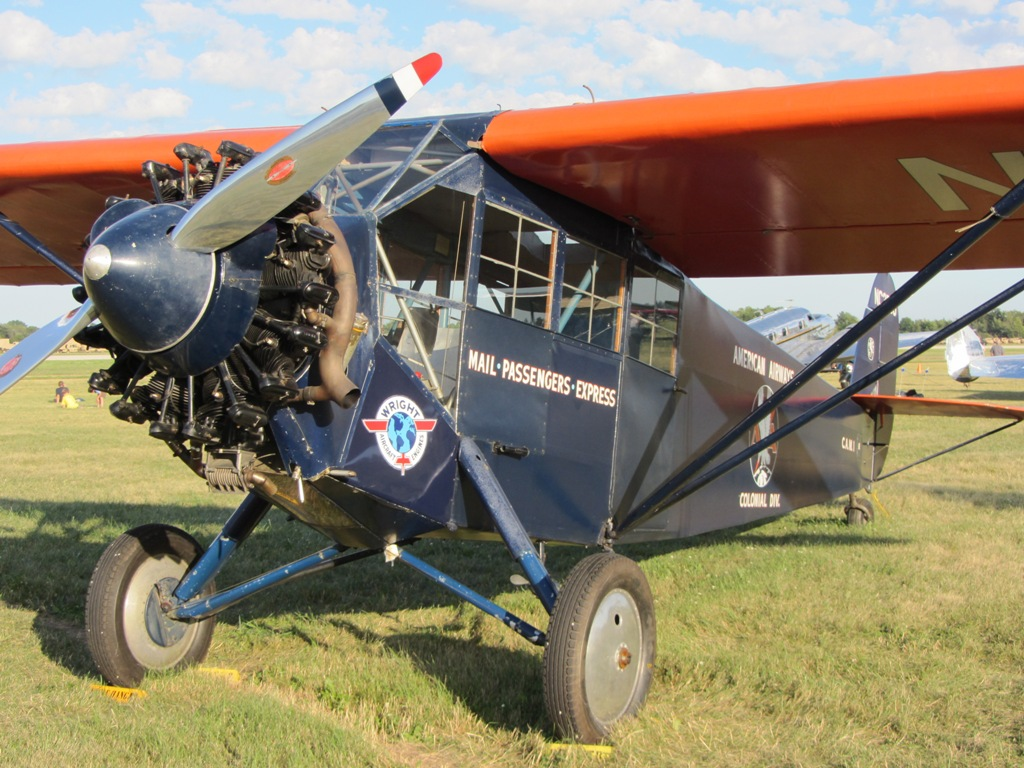
Fairchild FC-2 with Wright J-5 engine, in American Airways markings.

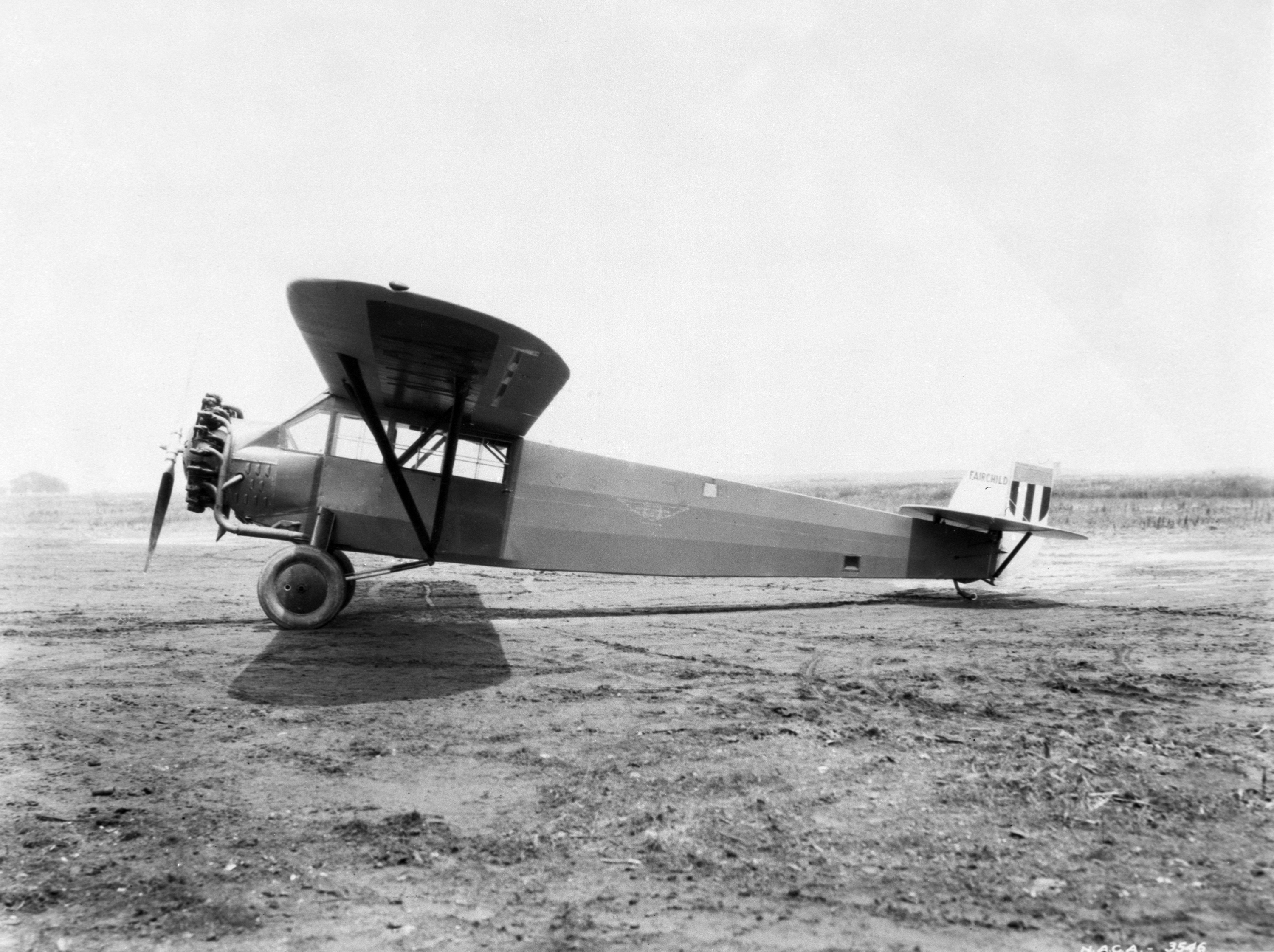
Fairchild FC-2W2 N13934, NACA's first aircraft

- FC-1 - prototype with Curtiss OX-5 engine (one built)
  - FC-1A - prototype modified with Wright J-4 engine (one converted)
- FC-2 - production version with Wright J-5 engine (118 built, plus 12 built by Canadian Vickers under license)
  - FC-2C (for "Challenger") - version with Curtiss Challenger engine for Curtiss Flying Service (six built)
  - FC-2L (for "Lynx") - version with Armstrong Siddeley Lynx engine for Royal Canadian Air Force (three converted)
  - FC-2W (for "Wasp") - version with Pratt & Whitney Wasp engine (14 built)
    - FC-2W2 - definitive production version of FC-2W
      - UC-96 - designation given to three FC-2Ws impressed into USAAF service
      - Model 61 - FC-2W2s with enlarged cabin (three converted)
  - Model 51 - FC-2s refitted with Wright J-6 engine (31 built)
  - XJQ-1 (later RQ-2) - single FC-2 purchased by United States Navy for evaluation. Redesignated XJQ-2, later redesignated again as the XRQ-2.

== Operators ==
Canada

- Royal Canadian Air Force
- Canadian Colonial Airways

Chile

- Línea Aeropostal Santiago-Arica(LAN Chile)

United States

- American Airlines
- Clifford Ball Inc.
- Pan American Airways
- NACA

== Specifications (FC-2) ==
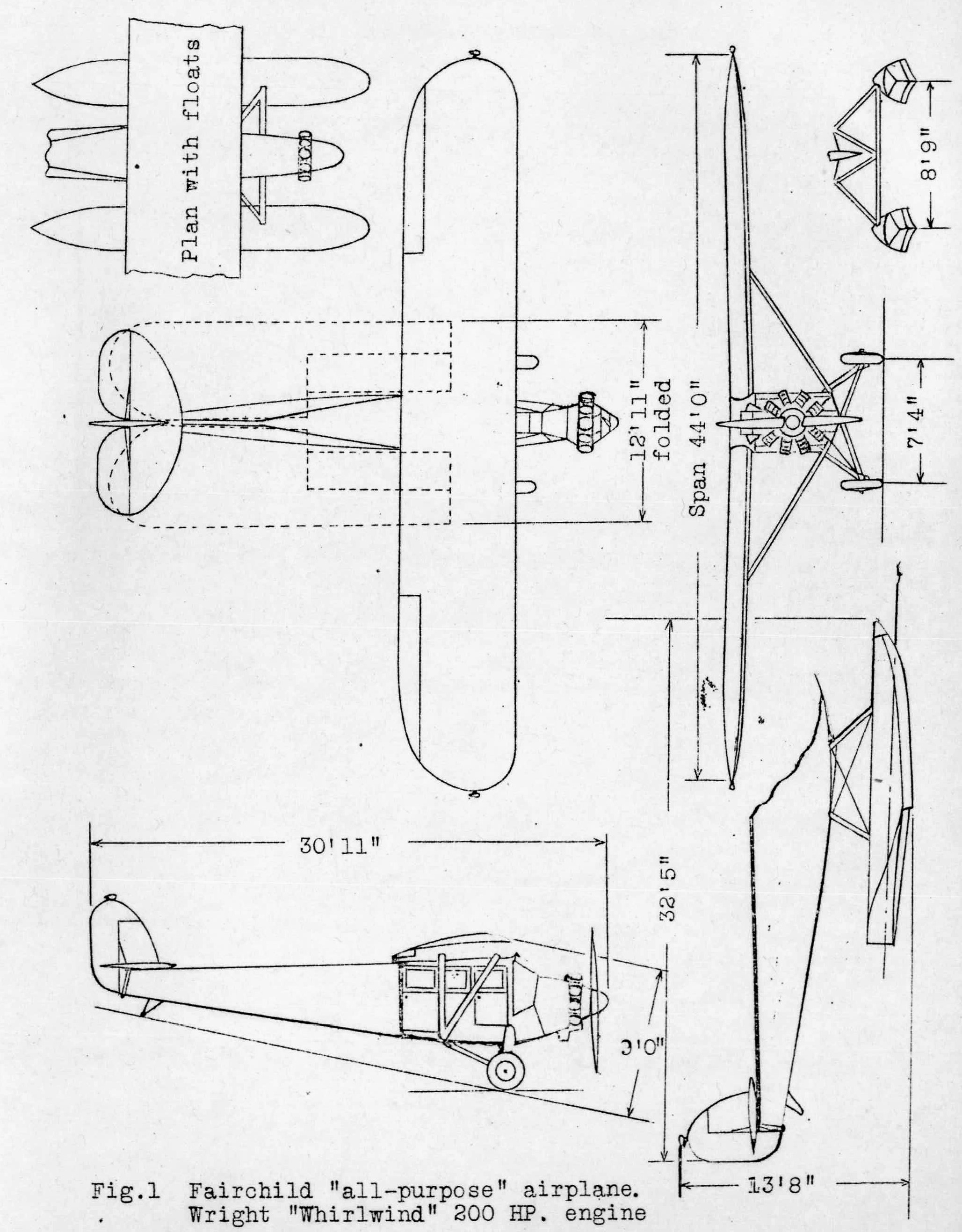
Fairchild FC-2 3-view drawing

General characteristics

- Crew: one pilot
- Capacity: four passengers "or" 820 lb (372 kg) freight
- Length: 31 ft 0 in (9.45 m)
- Wingspan: 44 ft 0 in (13.41 m)
- Height: 9 ft 0 in (2.74 m)
- Wing area: 290 sq ft (26.9 m^{2})
- Empty weight: 2,160 lb (980 kg)
- Gross weight: 3,600 lb (1,633 kg)
- Powerplant: 1 × Wright J-5 , 200 hp (149 kW)

Performance

- Maximum speed: 122 mph (196 km/h, 106 kn)
- Range: 700 mi (1,127 km, 610 nmi)
- Service ceiling: 11,500 ft (3,500 m)
- Rate of climb: 565 ft/min (2.9 m/s)
