= Canadian Vickers Vigil =

Vigil
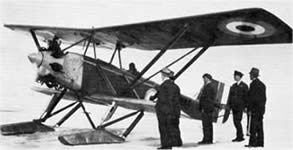

General information
- Type: Patrol Aircraft
- National origin: Canada
- Manufacturer: Canadian Vickers
- Primary user: Royal Canadian Air Force
- Number built: 1

History
- Introduction date: 11 May 1928
- Retired: 3 November 1930

The Canadian Vickers Vigil was a single-seat patrol aircraft designed to meet a Royal Canadian Air Force requirement for a forest fire patrol aircraft.

== Design and development ==
In 1926, the RCAF issued specifications for an aircraft to replace the Airco DH.4 aircraft used at the time. Canadian Vickers designed the Vigil which had steel-structured wings with aluminum skin throughout, and was a strut-braced sesquiplane. The aircraft was overweight, which impacted the aircraft service ceiling and performance, which in turn made it unsuitable for its role. Only one was ever built.

== Operational history ==
Unfit for its intended role, the aircraft was sent to Rockcliffe Air Station in Ottawa, Ontario. It was used by pilots stationed there for proficiency flying. The aircraft was used for airmail deliveries to Maritime Canada between January 1929 until February 1929. About a year later, the need for repair and overhaul became necessary and after assessment it was determined this was not cost effective, so the aircraft was scrapped.

== Specifications ==
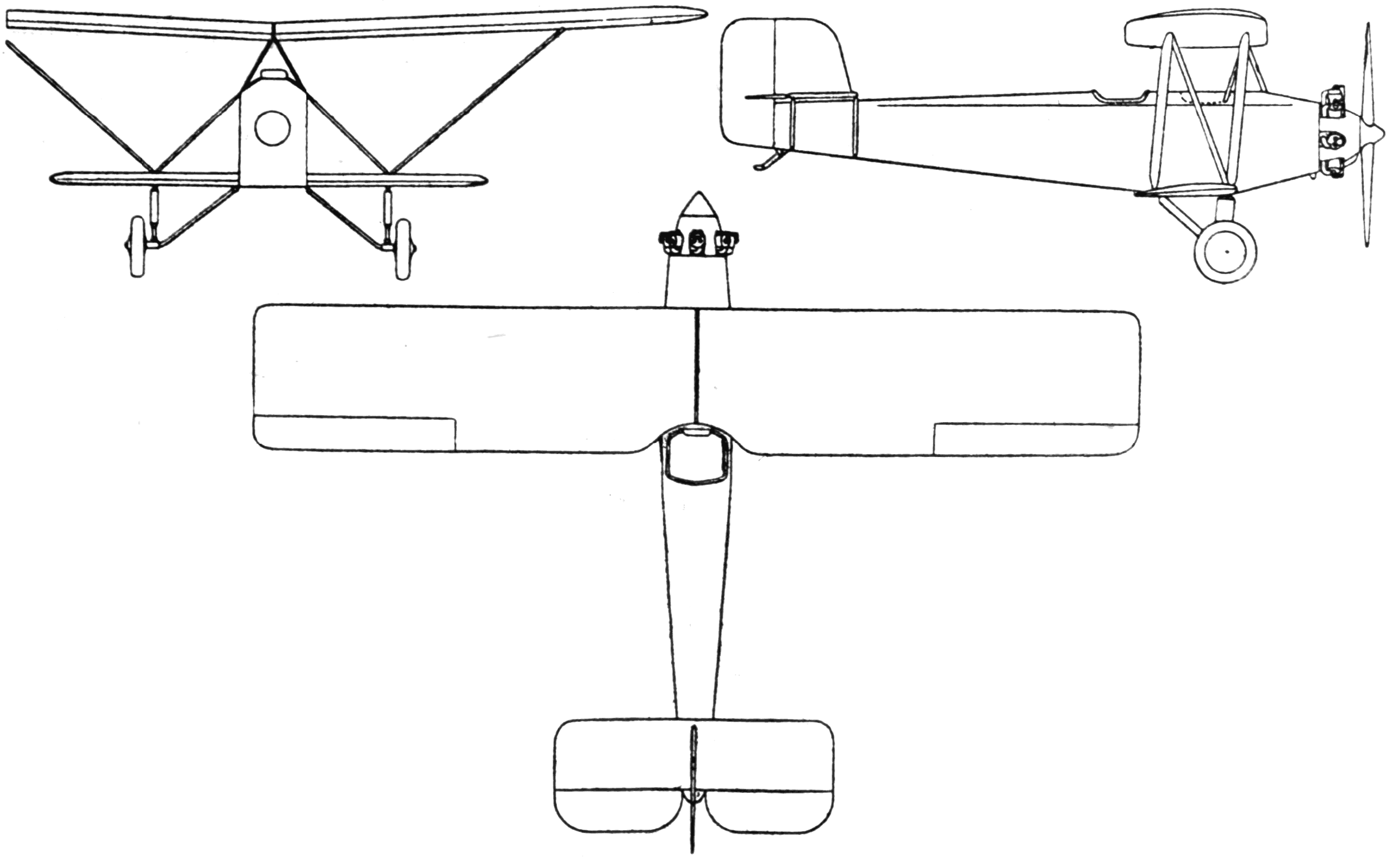
Canadian Vickers Vigil 3-view drawing from L'Air July 1,1927

Data from Jane's all the World's Aircraft 1928

General characteristics

- Crew: 1
- Length: 26 ft 11 in (8.2 m)
- Upper wingspan: 35 ft 1 in (10.7 m)
- Lower wingspan: 16 ft 8 in (5.08 m)
- Height: 10 ft 0 in (3.04 m)
- Wing area: 281 sq ft (26.1 m^{2})
- Empty weight: 2,005 lb (909 kg)
- Gross weight: 2,750 lb (1,247 kg)
- Fuel capacity: 410 lb (190 kg)
- Powerplant: 1 × Armstrong Siddeley Lynx IV 7-cylinder air-cooled radial piston engine, 180 hp (130 kW)
- Propellers: 2-bladed fixed pitch propeller

Performance

- Maximum speed: 116 mph (187 km/h, 101 kn)
- Cruise speed: 95 mph (153 km/h, 83 kn)
- Service ceiling: 13,000 ft (4,000 m)
