= Canadian Vickers Vanessa =

Vanessa
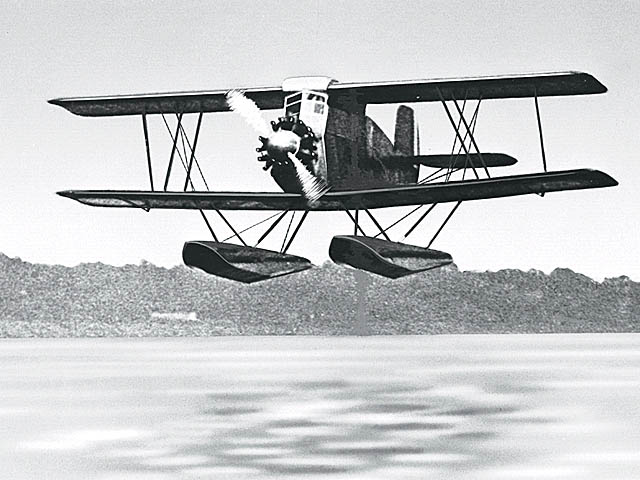

General information
- Type: transport seaplane
- Manufacturer: Canadian Vickers
- Status: Cancelled
- Primary user: Royal Canadian Air Force (intended)
- Number built: 1

The Canadian Vickers Vanessa was a Canadian biplane transport floatplane of the 1920s evaluated by the Royal Canadian Air Force (RCAF) and used briefly for delivering air-mail.

== Design and development ==
The Vanessa was developed as a private venture commercial seaplane.

It was a single-engine, twin-float cabin biplane of mixed construction. The enclosed cabin fuselage was constructed of steel tubing as were various support structures along with the tail surfaces. The wings were of wood construction and the entire aircraft was fabric covered. Its interplane struts were unusual in forming a pair of "X"s on each side, when viewed from the front which eliminated the need for wire bracing and improved access to the cabin. Ailerons were fitted to each of the equal span wings which were linked with connecting rods. As first built, these ran the full span of the wings, but were reduced to about half the span shortly afterwards.

== Testing ==
One prototype, registered G-CYZJ, was built, after which the Royal Canadian Air Force indicated an interest in the type as a communications aircraft. Testing indicated that the aircraft was under-powered and the 200 hp (150 kW) Armstrong Siddeley Lynx was replaced with a 220 hp (160 kW) Wright Whirlwind.

In September 1927, the Vanessa was used for several airmail flights. On 9 September 1927 at Rimouski, Quebec on the Saint Laurence River about 280 km (170 mi) east of Quebec City, its RCAF pilot received 502 lb (228 kg) of mail from the west-bound RMS Empress of France. While taxiing for takeoff, a wake from a passing vessel hit it, breaking a strut, which then allowed the aircraft's starboard float to be hit by the propeller, which sliced the float in half. The aircraft capsized, broke up, and sank but the pilot escaped and the mail was recovered, which continued on by rail.

The wreck was salvaged but was found to be uneconomical to repair and development was abandoned.

Despite a very brief career, the Vanessa has the distinction of being one of the first enclosed cabin aircraft designed in Canada.

== Specifications (Vanessa–Lynx engine) ==
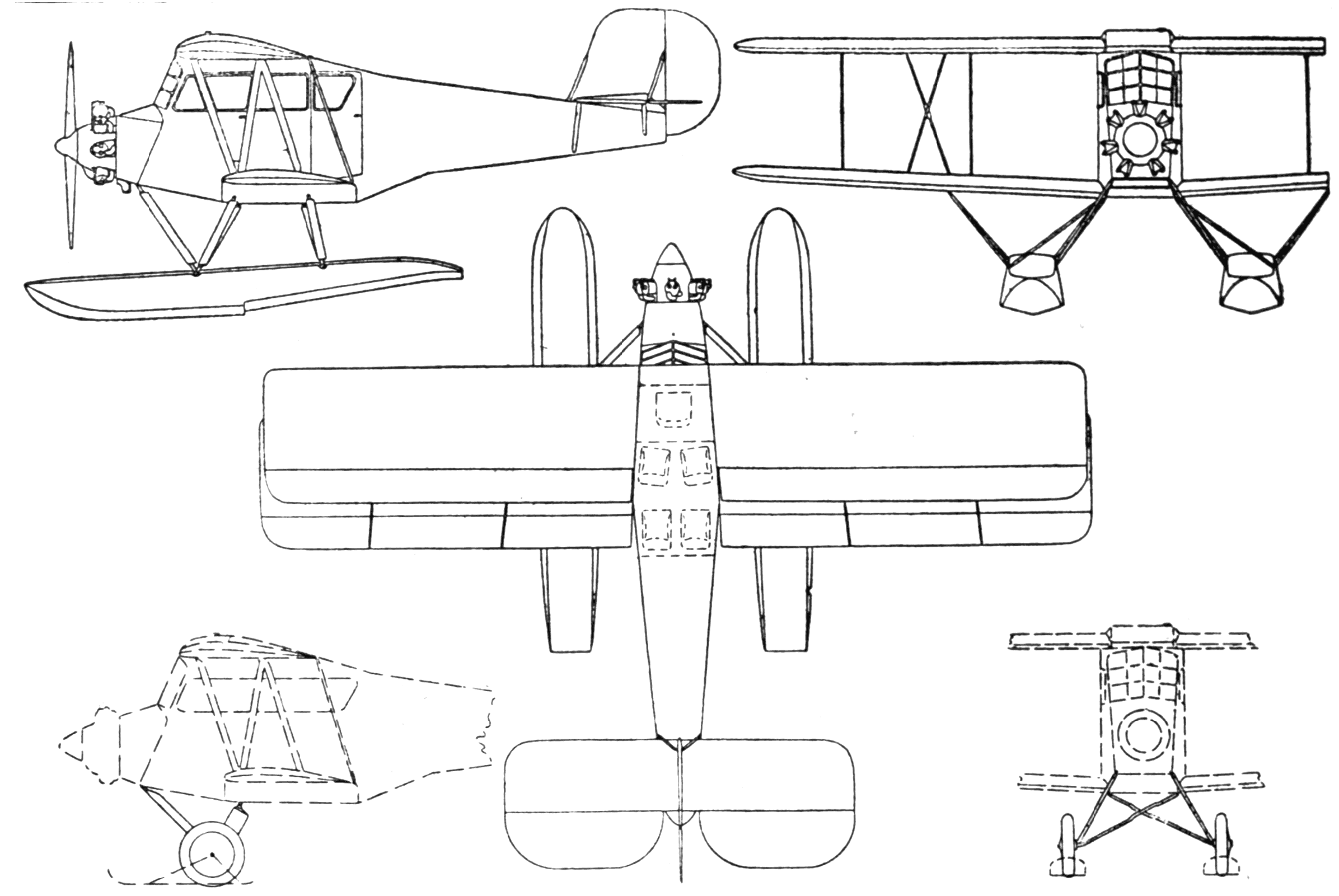
Canadian Vickers Vanessa 3-view drawing from L'Air July 1, 1927

Data from Jane's all the World's Aircraft 1928, RCAF.com

General characteristics

- Crew: 1
- Capacity: 4 passengers
- Length: 29 ft 11 in (9.13 m)
- Wingspan: 35 ft 1 in (10.7 m)
- Height: 12 ft 3 in (3.73 m)
- Wing area: 410 sq ft (38 m^{2})
- Empty weight: 2,120 lb (962 kg)
- Max takeoff weight: 3,400 lb (1,542 kg)
- Fuel capacity: 400 lb (180 kg)
- Powerplant: 1 × Armstrong Siddeley Lynx 7-cylinder air-cooled radial piston engine, 200 hp (150 kW)
- Propellers: 2-bladed fixed-pitch wood propeller

Performance

- Maximum speed: 103 mph (166 km/h, 90 kn)
- Landing speed:' 45 mph (39 kn; 72 km/h)
- Service ceiling: 12,000 ft (3,700 m)
- Rate of climb: 550 ft/min (2.8 m/s)

== Bibliography ==
- Molson, K.M.; Taylor, H.A. (1982). Canadian aircraft since 1909 (1. publ. ed.). Stittsville, Ont.: Canada's Wings. ISBN 0-920002-11-0.
