= Canadian Vickers Velos =

Velos
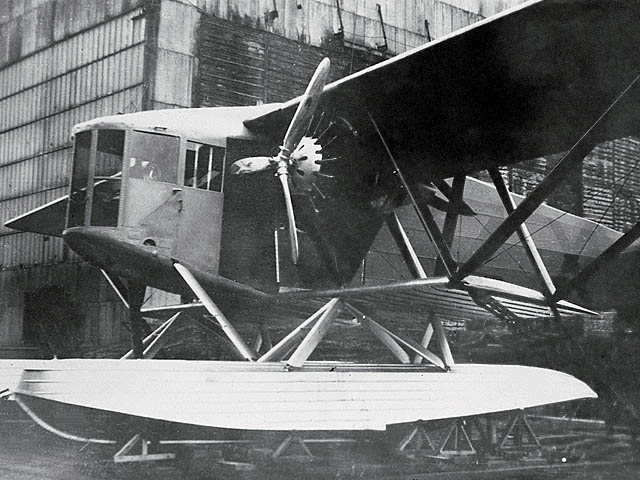

General information
- Type: Survey floatplane
- National origin: Canada
- Manufacturer: Canadian Vickers
- Status: destroyed
- Primary user: Royal Canadian Air Force
- Number built: 1

History
- First flight: 1928
- Retired: 1928

The Canadian Vickers Velos was a Canadian twin-engined float-equipped sesquiplane designed and built by Canadian Vickers Limited in 1928. Designed for survey work, it proved difficult to fly and only one was built.

== Operator ==
Canada

- Royal Canadian Air Force

== Specification ==
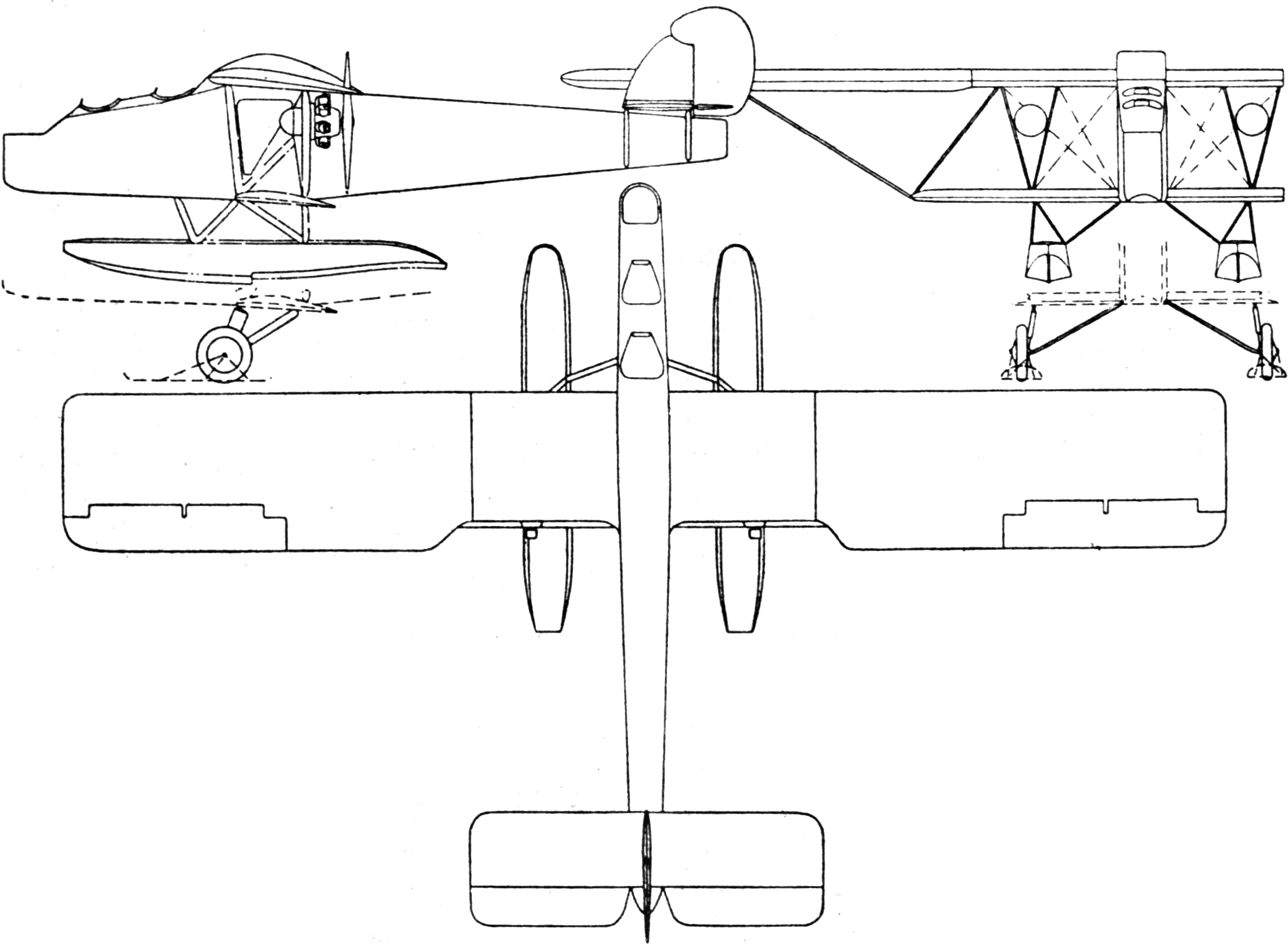
Canadian Vickers Velos 3-view drawing from L'Air June 1,1927

Data from

General characteristics

- Length: 44 ft 0 in (13.41 m)
- Wingspan: 68 ft 0 in (20.73 m)
- Max takeoff weight: 7,918 lb (3,592 kg)
- Powerplant: 2 × Pratt & Whitney Wasp radial piston engine

Performance

- Maximum speed: 85 mph (137 km/h, 74 kn)

== See also ==
Related lists

- List of flying boats and floatplanes
