= Canadian Vickers Varuna =

Varuna
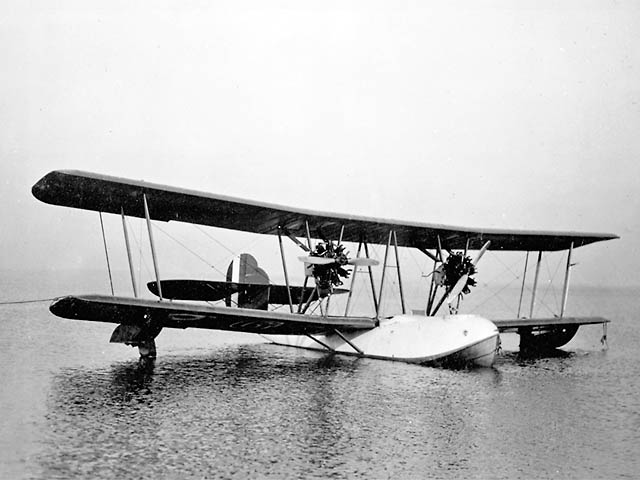

General information
- Type: Transport flying-boat
- Manufacturer: Canadian Vickers
- Status: out of service
- Primary user: Royal Canadian Air Force
- Number built: 8

History
- Retired: 1932
- Developed from: Canadian Vickers Vedette

The Canadian Vickers Varuna was a Canadian flying boat of the 1920s built by Canadian Vickers as a twin-engined, unequal-span biplane, with a wooden hull and steel tube structure.

== Design and development ==
The Varuna was developed in response to a Royal Canadian Air Force requirement for a flying boat to transport men and equipment to forest fires. It was a large-scale twin-engined version of the Vedette.

== Operational history ==
Most Varunas spent their service in Manitoba operating in their intended role; all Varuna IIs were withdrawn in 1930 and the sole Varuna I was struck off in 1932

== Variants ==
- Varuna I - with Wright J-6 Whirlwind radial engines, one built.
- Varuna II - with Armstrong Siddeley Lynx IV radial engines.

== Specifications (Varuna II) ==
Data from Jane's all the World's Aircraft 1928

General characteristics

- Crew: 4
- Length: 36 ft 10 in (11.23 m)
- Upper wingspan: 55 ft 1 in (16.8 m)
- Lower wingspan: 47 ft 4 in (14.42 m)
- Height: 13 ft 9 in (4.19 m)
- Wing area: 715 sq ft (66.4 m^{2})
- Empty weight: 3,369 lb (1,528 kg)
- Gross weight: 5,299 lb (2,404 kg)
- Fuel capacity: 90 imp gal (110 US gal; 410 L) in two wing tanks, with an optional 60 imp gal (72 US gal; 270 L) ferry tank in the hull
- Powerplant: 2 × Armstrong Siddeley Lynx IV 7-cyl. air-cooled radial piston engine, 187 hp (139 kW) each

Performance

- Maximum speed: 82 kn (94 mph, 151 km/h)
- Alighting speed: 44 mph (38 kn; 71 km/h)
- Service ceiling: 14,000 ft (4,300 m)
- Time to altitude: 5,000 ft (1,500 m) in 9 minutes
- Wing loading: 7.4 lb/sq ft (36 kg/m^{2})
- Power/mass: 0.0377 hp/lb (0.0620 kW/kg)
