= Canadian Vickers Vista =

Vista
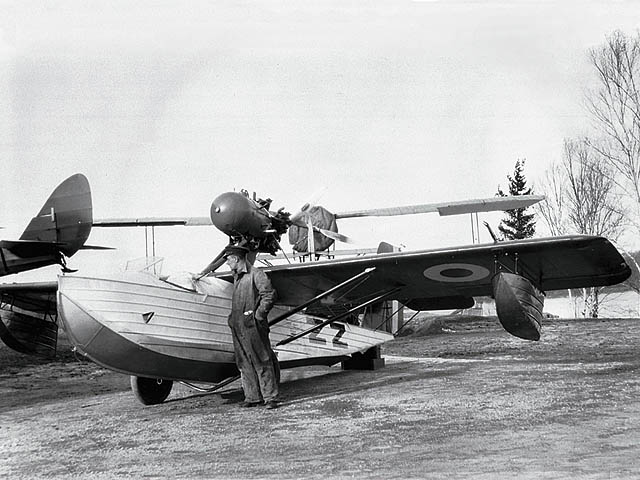

General information
- Type: Patrol aircraft
- Manufacturer: Canadian Vickers
- Designer: R. J. Mitchell
- Primary user: Royal Canadian Air Force
- Number built: 1

History
- Introduction date: 1927
- Retired: 1931

The Canadian Vickers Vista was a Canadian-designed single-seat flying boat.

== Design and development ==
The Vista was the first Canadian-designed monoplane. It had a duralumin sheet hull and the tail was made of framed metal tubing. The wings were made of wood and the wing and tail surfaces were fabric. The design proved to have some undesirable traits. Since the RCAF chose the de Havilland DH.60 Moth, only one Vista was ever built.

== Operational history ==
Once the prototype was completed, the production order was cancelled. After testing the airframe, the aircraft was shipped to the (RCAF) Air Station at (Jericho Beach), Vancouver in September 1930, where it was used for taxiing practice. When not being used it was moored out to test the effects of salt water on its duralumin hull. By 1931 the corrosion on the hull was bad enough that it was recommended for scrapping and this was done in May of that year.

== Specifications ==
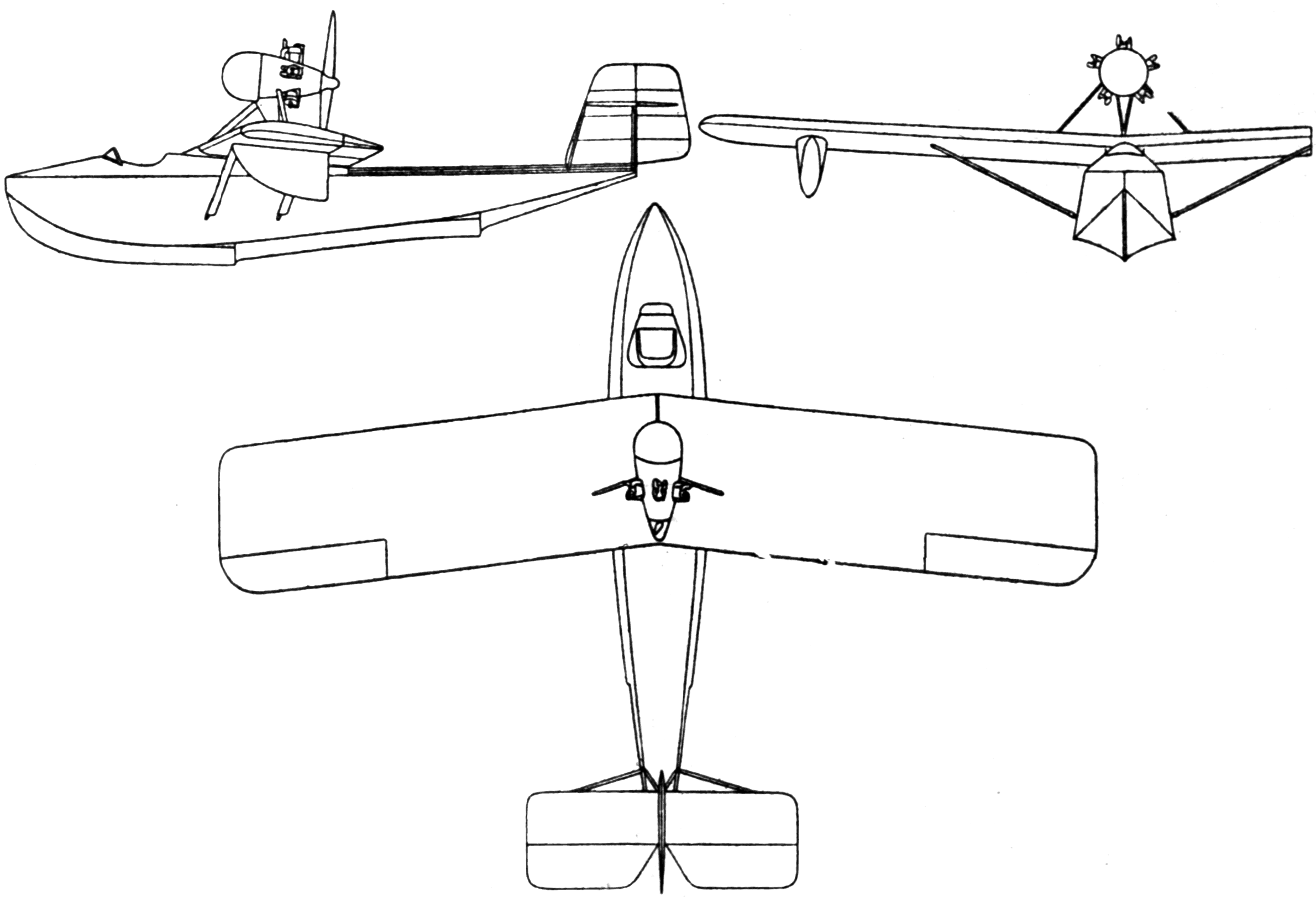
Canadian Vickers Vista 3-view drawing from L'Air June 1,1927

Data from Jane's all the World's Aircraft 1928

General characteristics

- Crew: 1
- Length: 23 ft 8 in (7.22 m)
- Wingspan: 29 ft 6 in (8.98 m)
- Height: 7 ft 6 in (2.28 m)
- Empty weight: 655 lb (297 kg)
- Gross weight: 1,005 lb (456 kg)
- Fuel capacity: 110 lb (50 kg) fuel and oil
- Powerplant: 1 × Armstrong-Siddeley Genet 5-cylinder air-cooled radial piston engine, 75 hp (56 kW)
- Propellers: 2-bladed fixed-pitch pusher propeller

Performance

- Maximum speed: 90 mph (140 km/h, 78 kn)
- Alighting speed: 45 mph (39 kn; 72 km/h)
- Cruise speed: 66 mph (106 km/h, 57 kn)
- Service ceiling: 12,000 ft (3,700 m)
- Rate of climb: 650 ft/min (3.3 m/s)
