= Canadian Vickers Vedette =

1924 flying boat

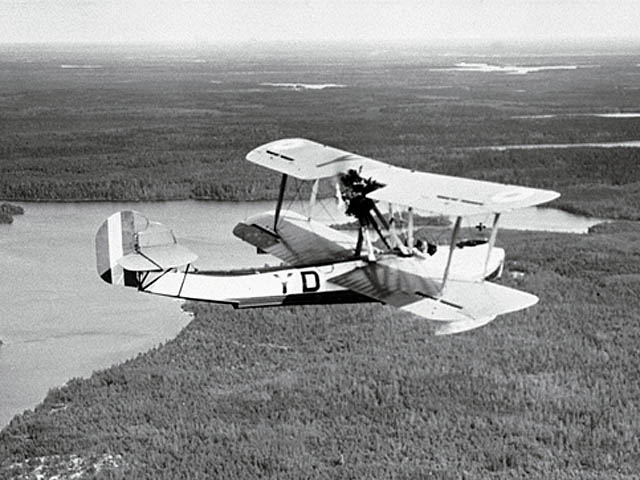

General information
- Type: amphibious general aviation survey
- Manufacturer: Canadian Vickers
- Designer: Wilfrid Thomas Reid (preliminary study by R.K.Pierson)
- Primary users: Royal Canadian Air Force Ontario Provincial Air Service; Manitoba Government Air Services; Servició de Aviación Militar de Chile
- Number built: 60 (plus two replicas)

History
- Manufactured: 1924–1930
- Introduction date: 1925
- First flight: 4 November 1924
- Retired: 1941

The Canadian Vickers Vedette was the first aircraft designed and built in Canada to meet a specification for Canadian conditions. It was a single-engine biplane flying boat purchased to meet a Royal Canadian Air Force (RCAF) demand for a smaller aircraft than the Vickers Viking with a much greater rate of climb, to be suitable for forestry survey and fire protection work. The type went on to have a long and distinguished career in civil operations in Canada. Most of the topographical maps in use in Canada today are based on photos taken from these aircraft.

== Design and development ==
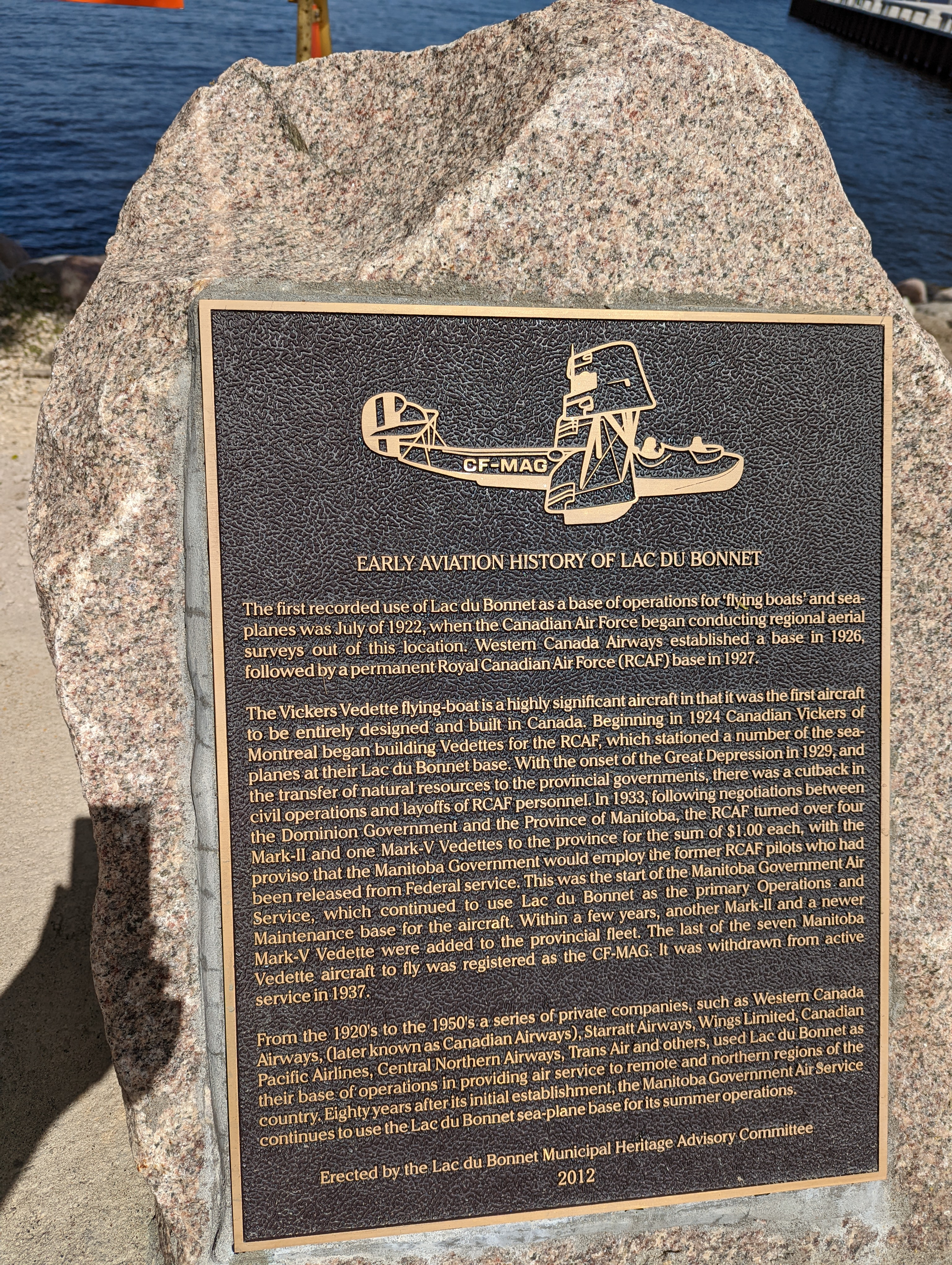
A historical plaque and a sculpture of a Vickers Vedette are installed at the waterfront in Lac du Bonnet, Manitoba.

Based on a preliminary design in early 1924 for a "flying boat" by R.K.Pierson of the British Vickers company, the Canadian Vickers Vedette was a three-seat single-engine pusher biplane. The design was passed to the subsidiary Canadian Vickers Limited of Longueuil, Quebec (formed in 1911) where Wilfrid Thomas Reid served as Chief Engineer, whose duties included overseeing the creation of all the needed detail drawings.

The prototype Vedette I was first flown on 4 November 1924, powered by a 200 hp (150 kW) Rolls-Royce Falcon III. It was subsequently fitted with 210 hp (160 kW) Wolseley Viper, 200 hp (150 kW) Wright J-4 and 215 hp (160 kW) Armstrong Siddeley Lynx engines for testing. Several versions of the Vedette were produced, including two amphibious versions and one with an enclosed cabin on an all-metal hull. With the exception of the engine changes, most of the remaining differences between versions were relatively minor. Visible differences included the wingtip floats, fuel tanks, and external strakes add to the rear fuselage. Each version was produced with a variety of engine types, so that Mk.IIs used the 215 hp (160 kW) Lynx IV, the 200 hp (150 kW) Wright J-4 or the 220 hp (160 kW) Wright J-5, while the Mk.V used the Lynx IV, the Wright J-5 or the 300 hp (220 kW) Wright J-6.

== Operational history ==
The first production example was provided to Fairchild Aerial Surveys (c/n 31 G-CAFF) before they started designing their own survey aircraft. The majority of the production run was purchased by the RCAF where the aircraft proved popular and versatile, if somewhat temperamental due to leaky hulls that required constant maintenance (a problem afflicting all wooden hulled flying boats). The Vedette undertook photographic and forestry patrols satisfactorily and provided a backbone for RCAF flying operations through the lean peacetime years. Vedettes started a coast-to-coast photographic survey that was needed to map out the large areas of the country still unmapped. These missions lasted until the outbreak of the Second World War, and would be completed after the war with newer types. Vedettes stationed on both coasts were also used for fishing and smuggling patrols, both with the RCAF and with Western Canada Airways.

The Vedette featured prominently in a number of mercy missions, while some airmen discovered it was nearly ideal for aerial goose hunting, at least until a pilot was hit by a goose. The first Canadian to join the Caterpillar Club by using a parachute to escape from an aircraft did so from RCAF Vedette "ZF" on 17 May 1929. The pilot, C.S. (Jack) Caldwell, while testing the aircraft at the Canadian Vickers factory, entered an uncontrollable spin after the engine failed and bailed out successfully over the St. Lawrence River.

The RCAF acquired the Wright J-4 powered Vedette I (G-CYFS) in 1925 and 18 Vedette IIs from 1926 onward. All of these were out of service before the Second World War began. From 1929 to 1930, the RCAF received 13 Vedette Vs with a higher gross weight, and 11 fitted with Handley Page wing slots as the Vedette Va. The single Vedette VI featured a metal hull, and a soon to be removed enclosed cockpit. A single mark V was refurbished and converted by the factory into the sole Vam and given a new metal hull, as well as a new serial number, the last for a Vedette, but it retained its original RCAF call sign as "ZD." Additional conversions of Mk Vs with the new metal hulls were cancelled. Seven Vedette Va flying boats and the Mk VI survived long enough to see wartime service, flying with No 4(BR) Squadron and the Seaplane and Bomber Reconnaissance Training School (later No 13 OT Sqn) at RCAF Station Jericho Beach, near Vancouver, BC until May 1941.

The company exported six Wright J-5 powered Vedette V amphibians to Chile, where they were based at Puerto Montt, on an inlet off the Pacific coast, with the Escuadrilla de Anfibios N° 1 (since redesignated Grupo de Aviación N° 5). They were used to pioneer an air link between there and the capital Santiago, 569 mi (916 km) up the coast. At least one of the Vedettes (and possibly all six) was lost due to hurricane-force winds, which also caused the loss of two lives when one of the aircraft overturned while on the water.

The Ontario, Manitoba and Saskatchewan provincial governments used ex-RCAF Vedettes extensively for spotting forest fires in the heavily wooded areas of those provinces.

== Operators ==
Canada

- Royal Canadian Air Force (45 used)
- Fairchild Aerial Surveys (1 used)
- Manitoba (Government) Air Service (7 used)
- Ontario Provincial Air Service (2 used)
- Government of Saskatchewan (5 used)
- Western Canada Airways Ltd. (1 used)
- Canadian Airways (1 used)

Chile

- Chilean Air Force
  - Escuadrilla de Anfibios N° 1 (6 used)

== Variants ==
Vedette I
Prototype (c/n 9) tested variously with Rolls-Royce Falcon III, Wolseley Viper, Wright J-4 and Armstrong Siddeley Lynx IV engines.
Vedette II
Production version with Armstrong Siddeley Lynx IV, Wright J-4 or Wright J-5, modified rudder and other minor changes from prototype.
Vedette III & IV
Not built, but may have included an enclosed cabin transport, with the pilot seated in front of two passengers.
Vedette V
Improved amphibious version with Armstrong Siddeley Lynx IV, Wright J-5 or Wright J-6, most Canadian examples not equipped with wheels.
Vedette Va
Mk.V modified with Handley-Page leading edge slats.
Vedette Vam
One off Mk.V (c/n 123/170) refurbished with metal hull.
Vedette VI
One off (c/n 163) with metal hull, Armstrong Siddeley Lynx IV or Wright J-6 and Handley-Page leading edge slats.
Vassal I
Proposed variant using Clark Y airfoil section wings, not built.

== Survivors ==
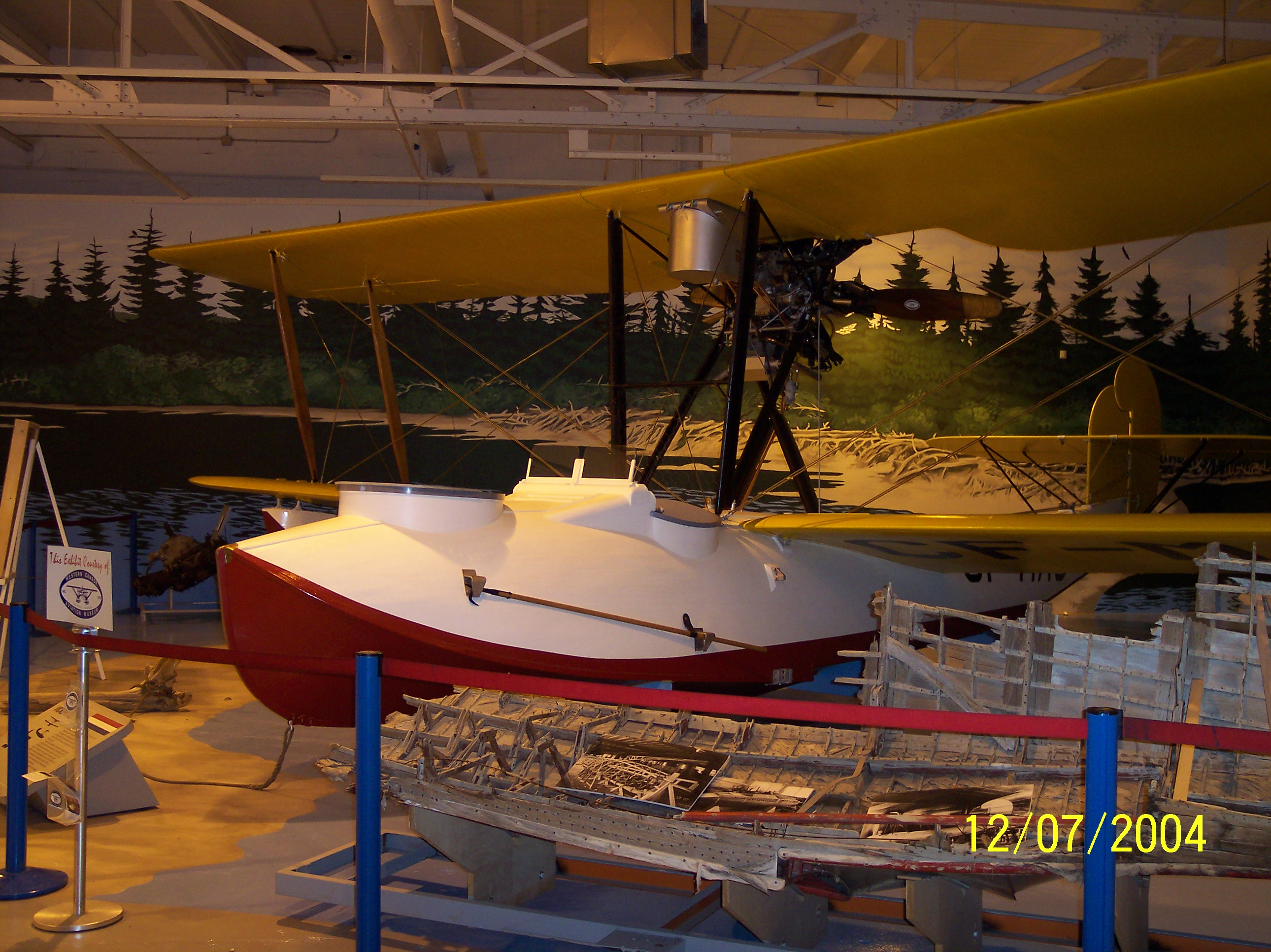
A Vickers Vedette replica at the Western Canada Aviation Museum, Winnipeg, Manitoba, Canada (now the Royal Aviation Museum of Western Canada)

There are no original intact surviving examples of the Vickers Vedette. There are two replicas in Canadian museums.

The first replica Vedette V (CF-MAG) is at the Royal Aviation Museum of Western Canada, Winnipeg, Manitoba. Unveiled on 24 May 2002, this was built with templates made from the remains of three different Vedette wrecks. These fragments helped with the creation of blueprints created by a WCAM volunteer who had worked for Canadian Vickers as a junior draughtsman. This project took over 100 volunteers 22 years and was built to 1920s airworthiness standards, but there are no plans to fly it, and it has not been certified. While three wrecks were used, the bulk of the information was contributed by CF-MAG. For this reason, it was decided to use this former registration number.

The original CF-MAG was built in 1929 and stored until purchased by the Manitoba Government in 1934, along with five ex-RCAF Vedettes (for $1 each) for forest fire patrols. In 1937, CF-AMG's engine failed while flying to Cormorant Lake, Manitoba. After landing in a swamp, the pilot walked to somewhere he could be rescued. A week later, an attempt was made to retrieve the aircraft, but the swamp was too small for takeoff. After usable parts were salvaged, it was set on fire.

A second wreck was recovered (G-CASW), which had crashed into a mountain on Porcher Island British Columbia while conducting a forest fire survey and was also recovered to aid in the design and blueprinting by WCAM. Finally, preserved pieces of a third Vedette were loaned to the museum by the National Aeronautical Museum in Ottawa.

The second replica is on display at the Saskatchewan Western Development Museum In 2003, the WDM acquired part of an original hull, which is displayed as an artifact in condition as found. With plans loaned from the Western Canada Aviation Museum, a group of volunteers from the Vintage Aircraft Restorers undertook the construction. It was completed in 2017. In 2014, the VAR Vendette Project won a Ninety-Nines Canadian Award in Aviation.

== Specifications (Mk II, Lynx IV engine) ==
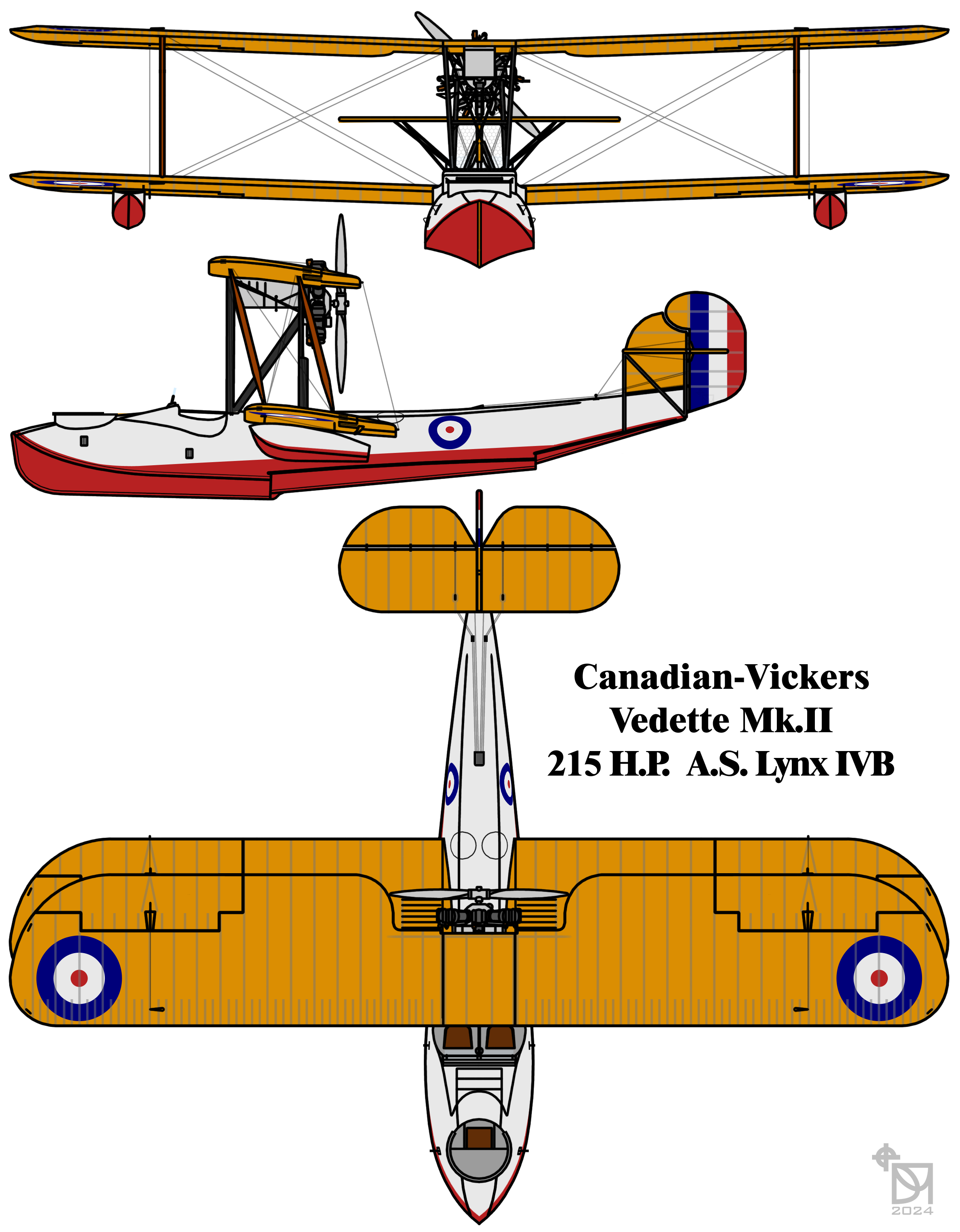
Canadian Vickers Vedette 3-view drawing

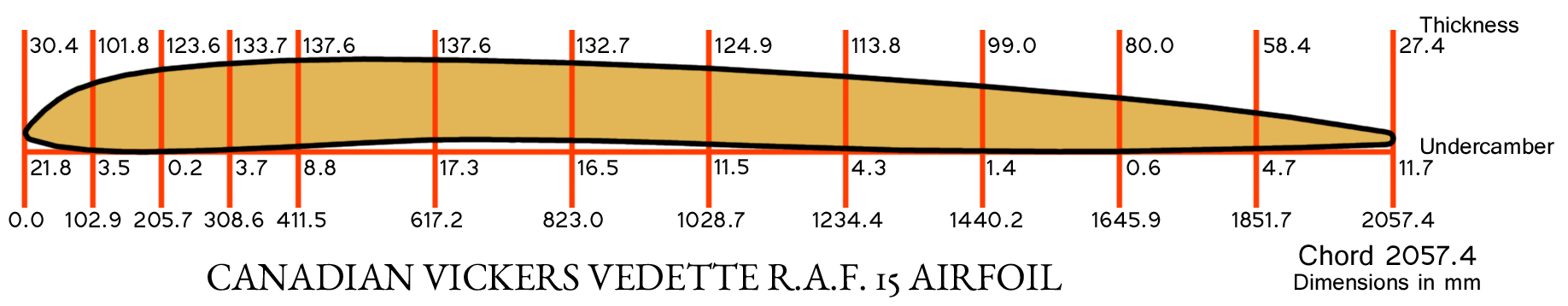
R.A.F. 15 Airfoil section used on Vedette

Data from The Canadian Vickers Vedette, Canadian Aeronautics and Space Journal, October 1964. Canadian Aircraft Since 1909

General characteristics

- Crew: 3
- Length: 32 ft 10 in (10.01 m)
- Wingspan: 42 ft 0 in (12.80 m)
- Upper and lower wing chord: 81 in (2,057.4 mm)
- Wing stagger: 19.25 in (489 mm)
- Upper and lower wing dihedral: 2.0°
- Upper and lower wing incidence: 6.0°
- Tailplane Span: 12 ft 6 in (3.81 m)
- Height: 11 ft .25 in (3.3592 m)
- Wing area: 495.6 sq ft (46.04 m^{2})
- Airfoil: RAF 15
- Empty weight: 1,942 lb (881 kg)
- Gross weight: 3,200 lb (1,451 kg)
- Fuel capacity: 396 lb (180 kg)/66.5 imp gal (302 L; 79.9 US gal)
- Oil capacity: 64 lb (29 kg)/4.5 imp gal (20 L; 5.4 US gal)
- Powerplant: 1 × Armstrong Siddeley Lynx IV 7-cylinder air-cooled radial piston engine, 215 hp (160 kW)
- Propellers: 2-bladed fixed pitch wood or metal pusher propeller

Performance

- Maximum speed: 92 mph (148 km/h, 80 kn) at sea level; 87 mph (76 kn; 140 km/h) at 10,000 ft (3,000 m)
- Cruise speed: 75 mph (121 km/h, 65 kn) at 5,000 ft (1,500 m)
- Minimum control speed: 48 mph (77 km/h, 42 kn)
- Endurance: 6 hours
- Service ceiling: 13,000 ft (4,000 m)
- Time to altitude: 30 minutes to 10,000 ft (3,000 m)
- Wing loading: 6.46 lb/sq ft (31.5 kg/m^{2})
- Power/mass: 0.067 hp/lb (0.110 kW/kg)

== See also ==
Related lists

- List of interwar military aircraft
