= Armstrong Siddeley Lynx =

1920s British piston aircraft engine

Lynx
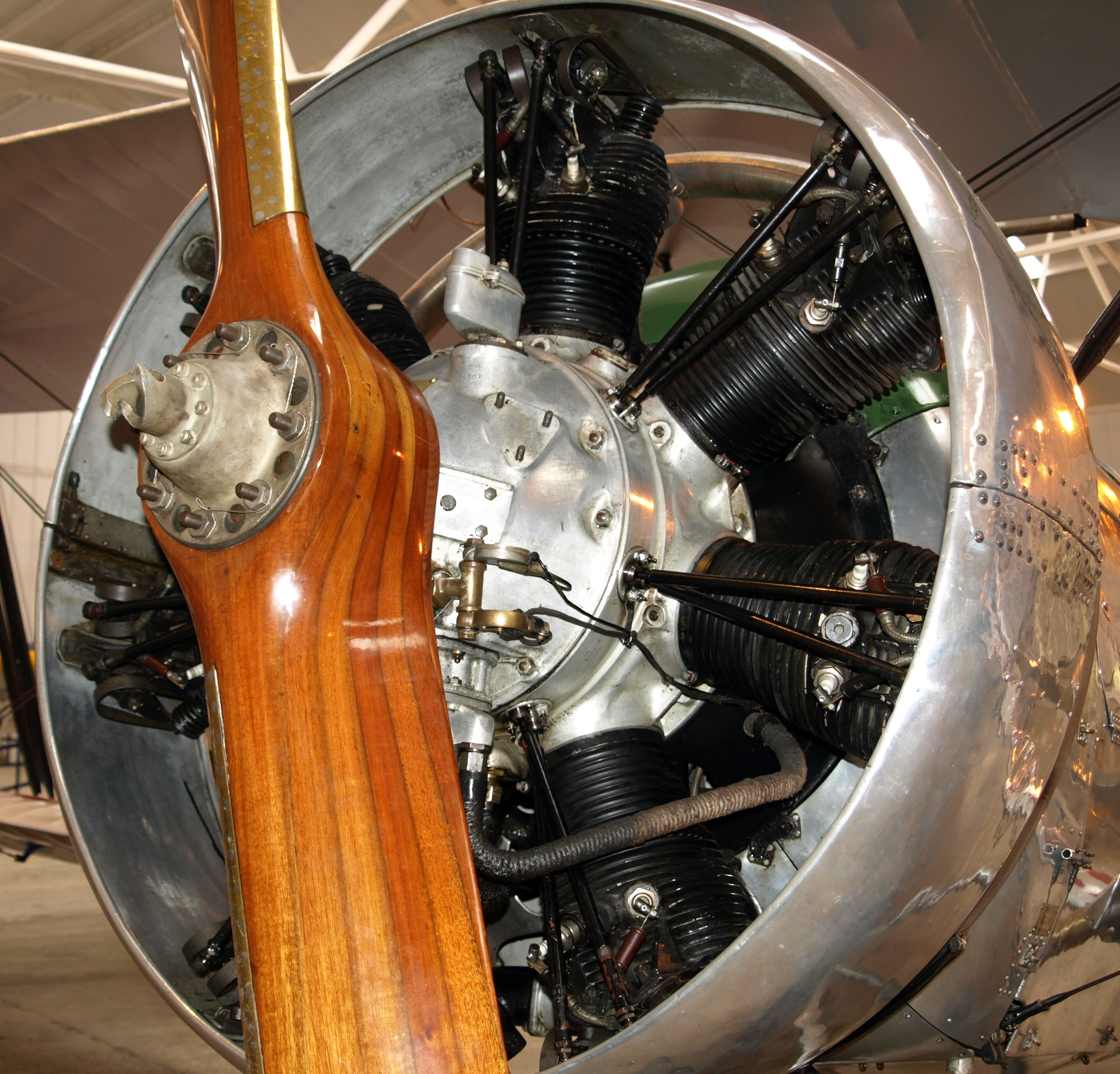
- Armstrong Siddeley Lynx fitted to the Shuttleworth Collection's airworthy Avro Tutor
- Type: Radial aero engine
- National origin: United Kingdom
- Manufacturer: Armstrong Siddeley
- First run: 1920
- Number built: 6,000
- Developed from: Armstrong Siddeley Jaguar
- Developed into: Armstrong Siddeley Cheetah

The Armstrong Siddeley Lynx is a British seven-cylinder aero engine developed by Armstrong Siddeley. It was developed as a single row version of the two-row Armstrong Siddeley Jaguar. Testing began in 1920 and 6,000 had been produced by 1939. In Italy Alfa Romeo built a 200 horsepower (150 kW) licensed version of this engine named the Alfa Romeo Lynx.

== Variants ==
Lynx I
1920, 150 hp (110 kW).
Lynx II
1920, 184 hp (137 kW).
Lynx III
1924, 200 hp (150 kW).
Lynx IV
1929, 180 hp (130 kW).
Lynx IVA
1930, 188 hp (140 kW).
Lynx IVB
1930, 215 hp (160 kW).
Lynx IVC
1929, 208 / 225 hp (155 / 168 kW).
Lynx IV(G)
1929, Geared propeller drive.
Lynx IV(MOD)
1929, 188 hp (140 kW), reconditioned and modified Lynx IV.
Lynx IV(S)
1928, 200 hp (150 kW), fully supercharged.
Lynx V (Lynx Major)

1930, increased bore and stroke, name changed from Lynx V to Lynx Major then Cheetah, half a Panther
Piaggio P.II
Licence production in Italy by Piaggio.

== Applications ==
- Airspeed Courier
- Airspeed Envoy
- Albatros L 68
- Avro 504
- Avro 618 Ten
- Avro Avocet
- Avro 641 Commodore
- Avro 626
- Avro 642/4m Eighteen
- Avro Sea Tutor
- Avro Tutor
- BAT Bantam
- Blackburn Lincock
- Boulton Paul Bittern
- Canadian Vickers Vanessa
- Canadian Vickers Varuna
- Canadian Vickers Vedette
- Cierva C.8
- de Havilland Hawk Moth

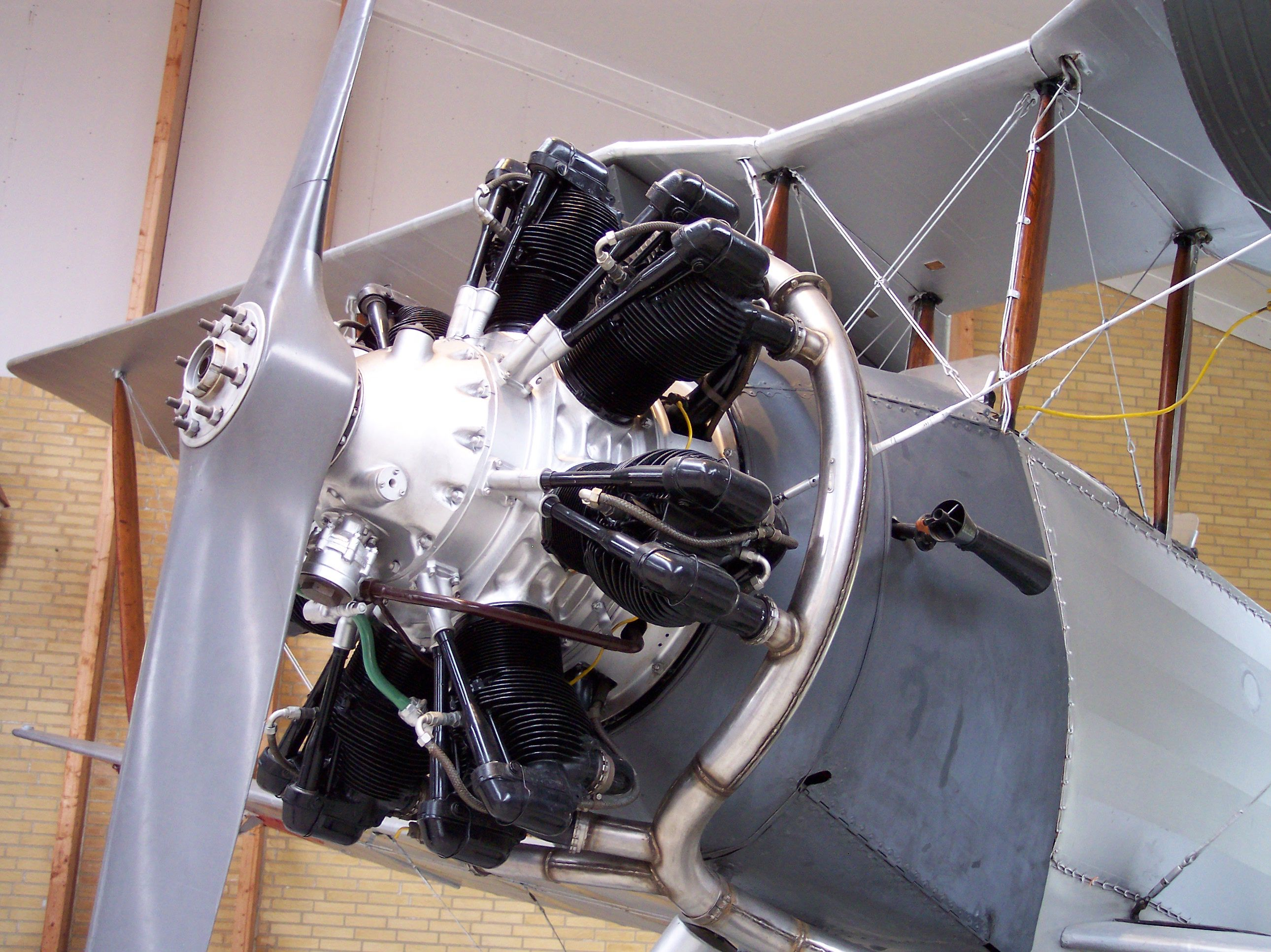
Preserved Lynx fitted to an Avro 504N

- Fairchild FC-2
- Fokker C.VII
- Fokker F.VIIA
- Gloster Grouse
- Messerschmitt M 18
- Morane-Saulnier MS.230
- Nieuport-Delage NiD 39
- Larynx
- Parnall Parasol
- Raab-Katzenstein RK-26
- Wackett Warrigal
- Saro Cloud
- Saro Cutty Sark
- Supermarine Seamew
- Vickers Vireo
- VL Tuisku
- Westland Wagtail

=== Alfa Romeo Lynx ===
- Breda Ba.19
- Breda Ba.25
- IMAM Ro.10

== Survivors ==
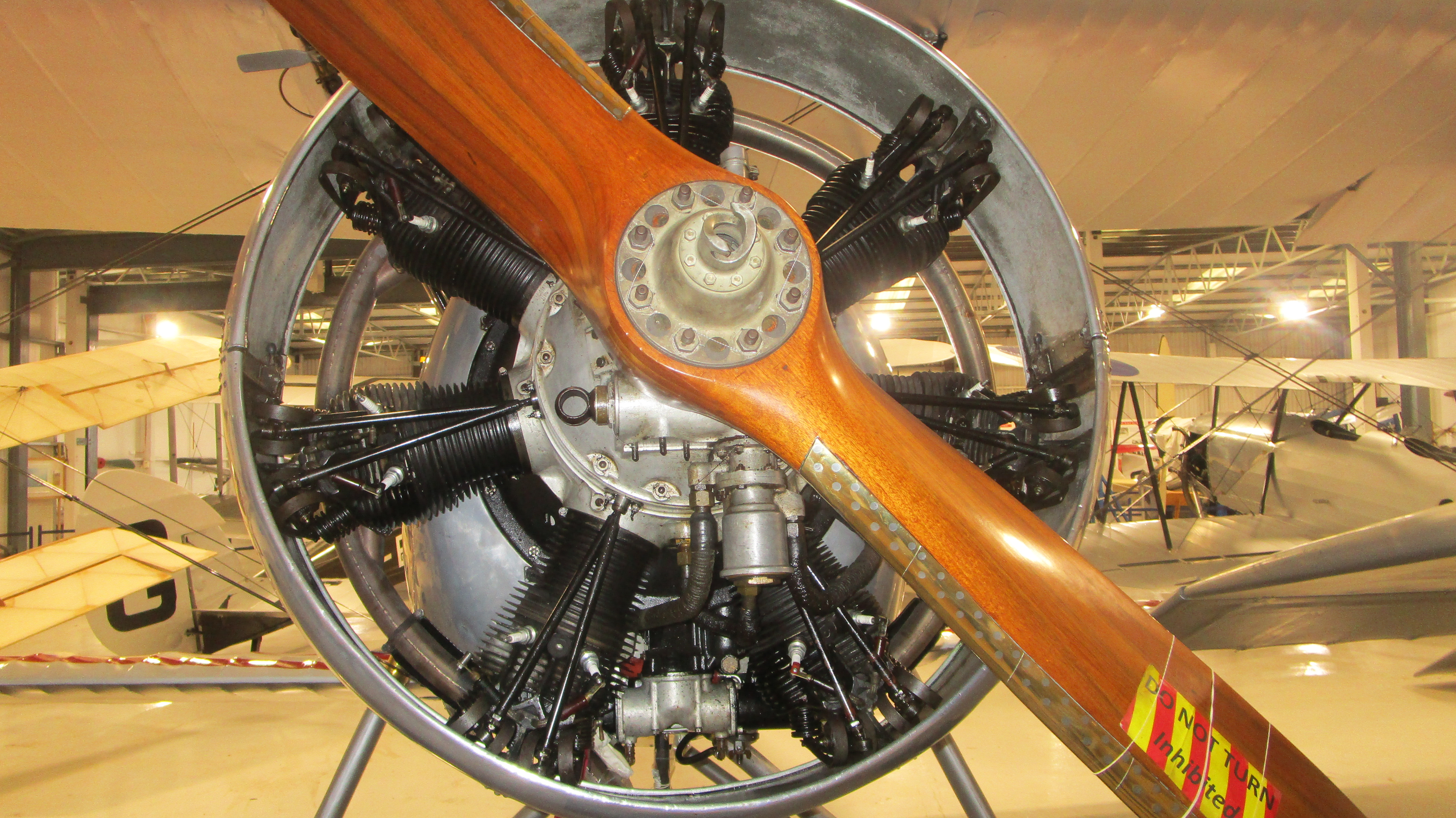
- Another view of the Armstrong Siddeley Lynx fitted to the Shuttleworth Collection's airworthy Avro Tutor
  Avro Tutor, K3215, powered by a Lynx IV, flies regularly at the Shuttleworth Collection and can be viewed in the museum at other times.

== Specifications (Lynx IV) ==
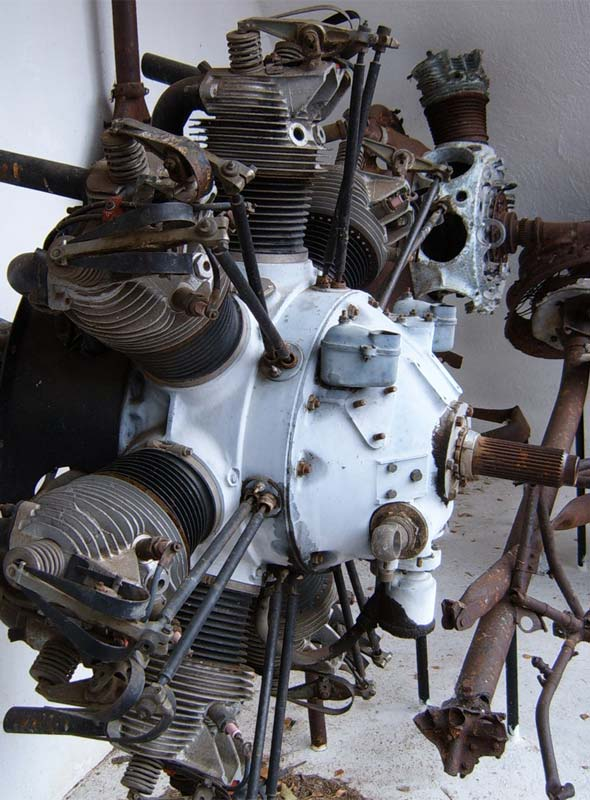
Armstrong Siddeley Lynx 7-cylinder radial from the Avro 618 Ten aircraft, Southern Cloud

Data from Lumsden

=== General characteristics ===
- Type: 7-cylinder air-cooled radial engine
- Bore: 5.0 in (127 mm )
- Stroke: 5.5 in (140 mm)
- Displacement: 756 cu in (12.4 L)
- Length: 45.6 in (1,158 mm)
- Diameter: 42 in (1,067 mm)
- Dry weight: 525 lb (238 kg )

=== Components ===
- Valvetrain: Overhead valve, 2 valves per cylinder
- Fuel system: Carburettor
- Cooling system: Air-cooled

=== Performance ===
- Power output: 187 hp (139 kW) at 1,700 rpm cruise / 215 hp (160 kW) at 1,900 rpm max
- Power-to-weight ratio: 0.35 hp/lb (0.6 kW/kg)

== See also ==
Related development

- Armstrong Siddeley Cheetah
- Armstrong Siddeley Jaguar

Comparable engines

- Jacobs R-755
- Siemens-Halske Sh 14
- Walter Castor
- Warner Scarab
- Wright R-760

Related lists

- List of aircraft engines
