= Airbus A330 MRTT =

Aerial refuelling tanker aircraft

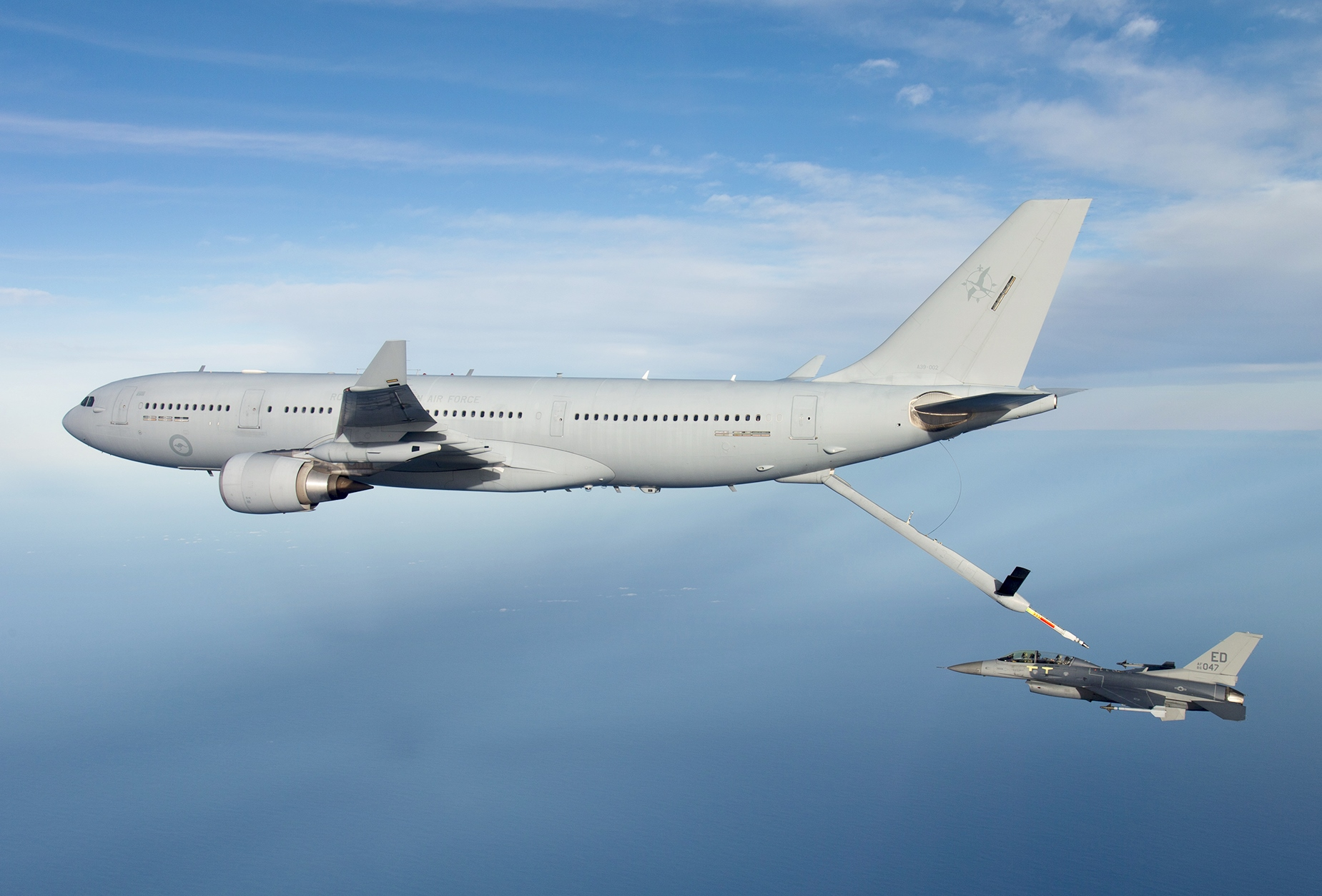
- A Royal Australian Air Force KC-30 refuels a USAF F-16 Fighting Falcon

General information
- Other names: Voyager KC2/3; KC-30; KC-330 Cygnus; CC-330 Husky
- Type: Multi-role tanker/transport
- Manufacturer: Airbus Defence and Space
- Status: In service
- Primary users: French Air and Space Force Royal Air Force; Royal Netherlands Air and Space Force; See Operators section for others
- Number built: 66 delivered as of 28 February 2026; 91 ordered as of 3 August 2026

History
- Manufactured: 2007–present
- Introduction date: 1 June 2011
- First flight: 15 June 2007
- Developed from: Airbus A330
- Variants: Airbus CC-330 Husky; EADS/Northrop Grumman KC-45
- Developed into: A330 MRTT+

The Airbus A330 Multi Role Tanker Transport (MRTT) is a European aerial refueling and military transport aircraft based on the civilian Airbus A330. A total of 17 countries have placed firm orders for approximately 85 aircraft, of which 66 have been delivered. A version of the A330 MRTT, the EADS/Northrop Grumman KC-45, was selected by the United States Air Force for its aerial tanker replacement program, but lost when the program was rebid. According to Airbus, the A330 MRTT has more than 90% of the air-to-air refueling aircraft market share outside the United States.

== Design and development ==
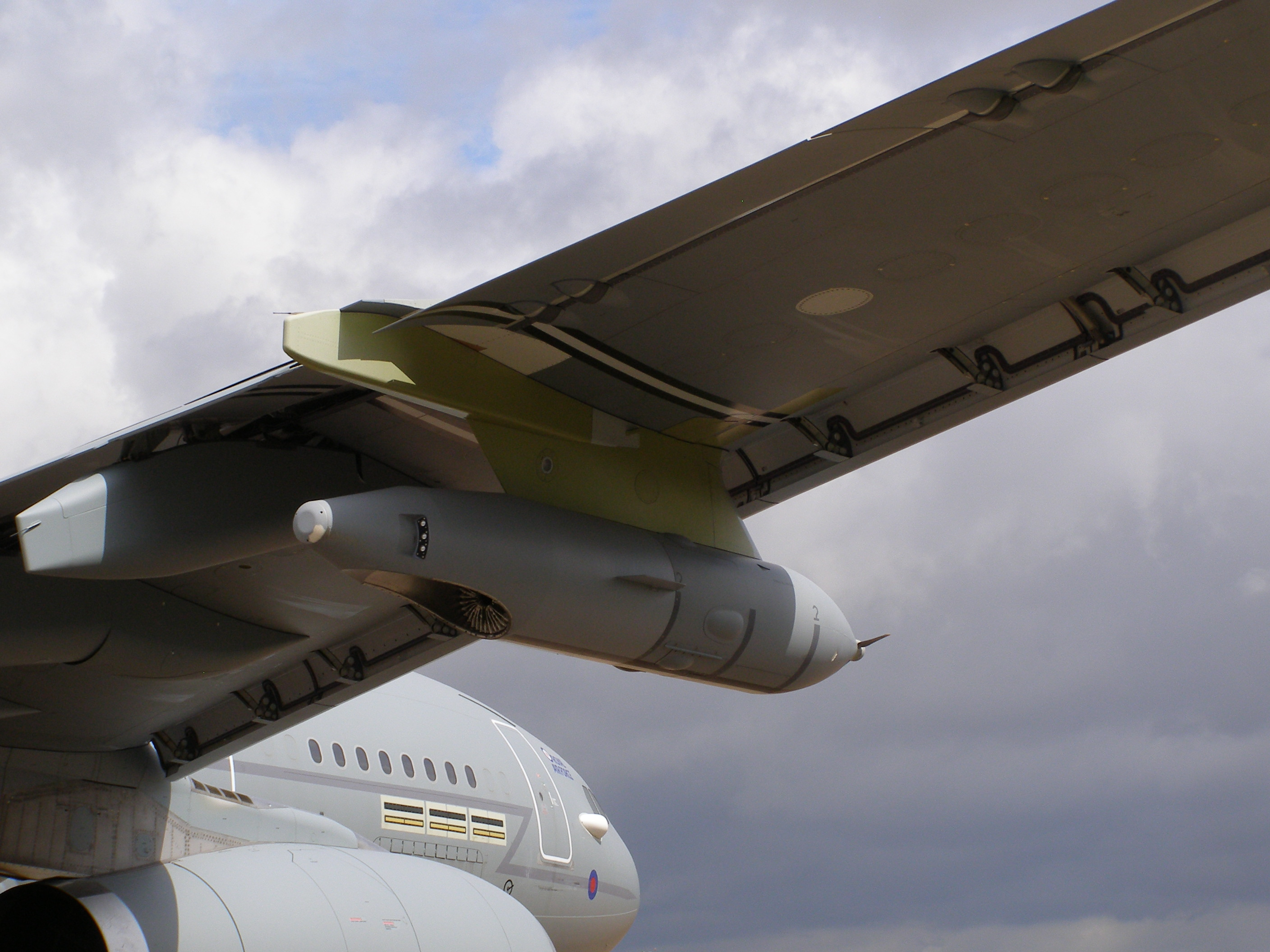
Starboard refuelling pod on a Royal Air Force (RAF) Voyager

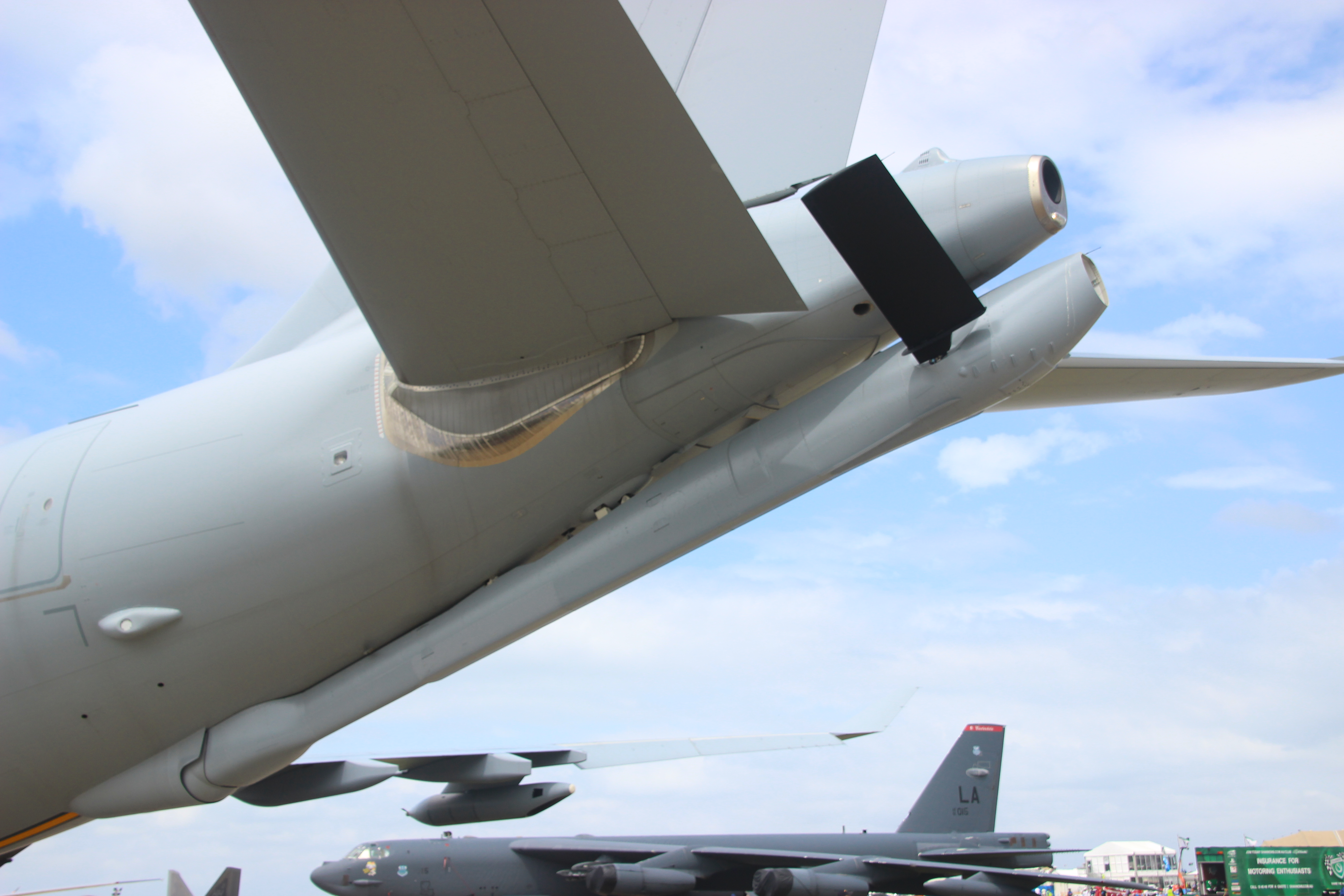
Centre refuelling boom under the tail of a RAAF KC-30A

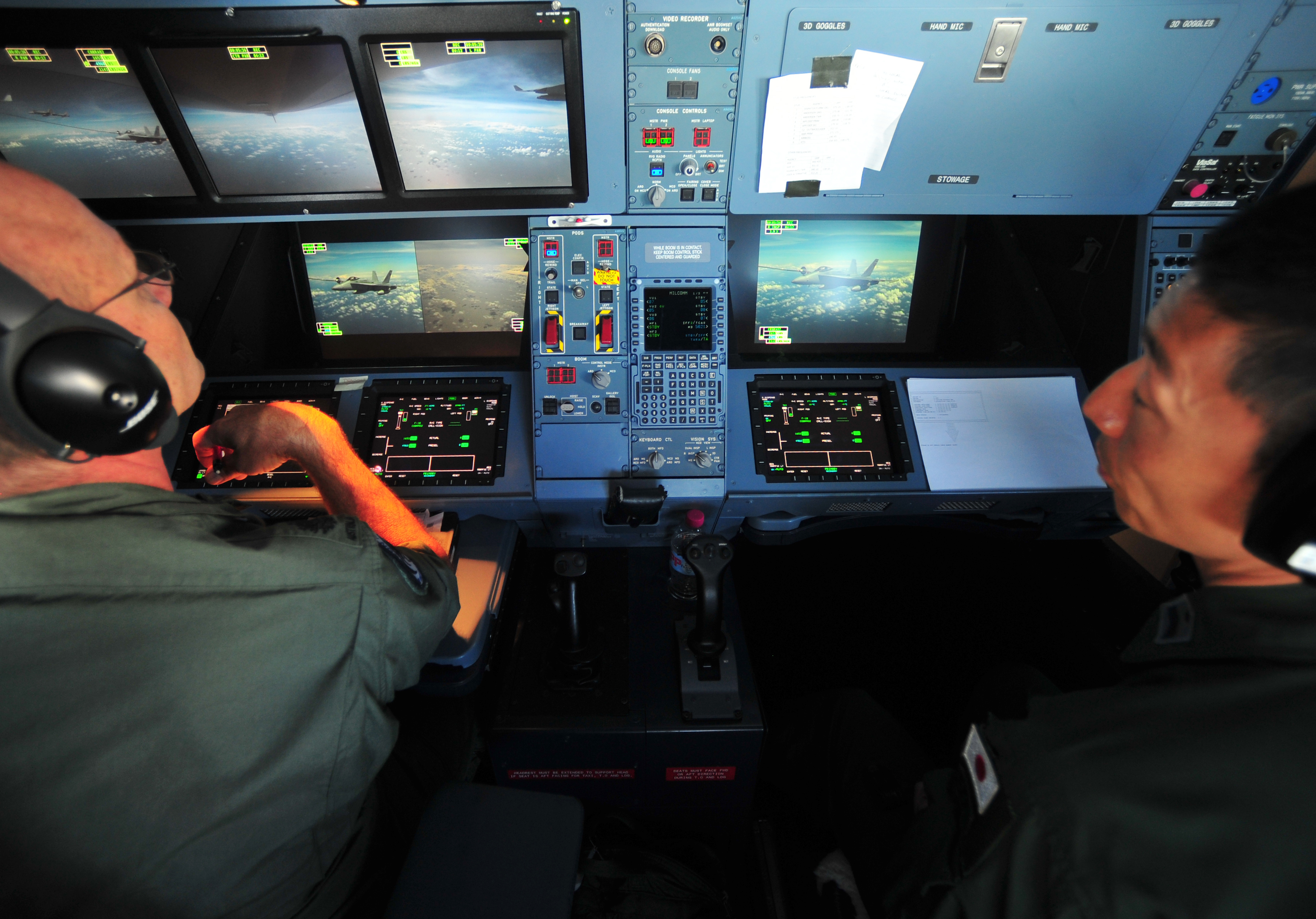
RAAF KC-30A refuelling control station. Refuelling systems are controlled by an operator in the cockpit, who can view the refuelling on 2D and 3D screens.

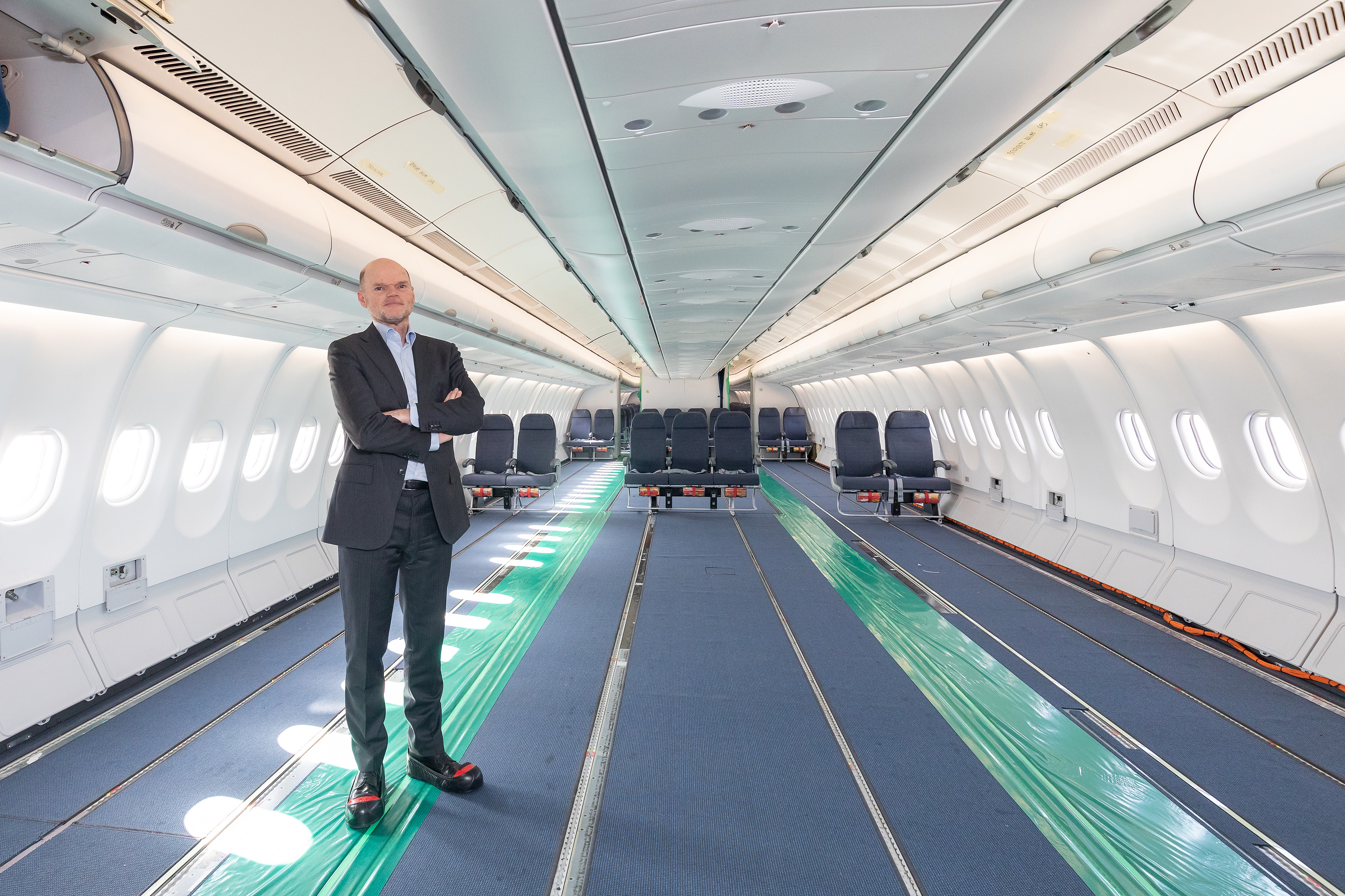
The A330 MRTT cabin can be reconfigured to carry passengers.

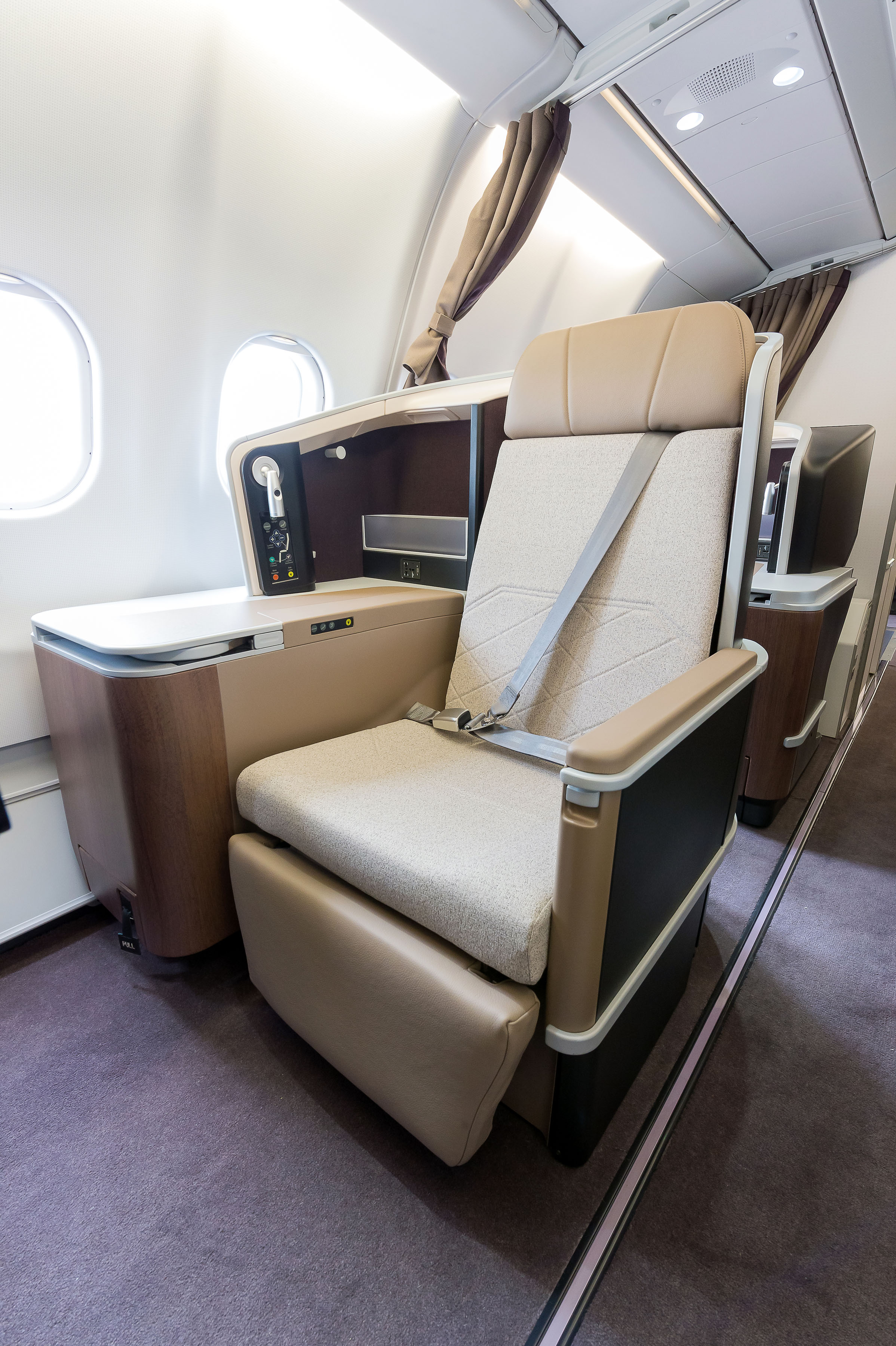
VIP interior

The Airbus A330 MRTT is a military derivative of the A330-200 airliner. It is designed as a dual-role air-to-air refuelling and transport aircraft. For air-to-air refuelling missions, the A330 MRTT can be equipped with a combination of any of the following systems:

- Refuelling other aircraft
  - Airbus Military Aerial Refuelling Boom System (ARBS) for receptacle-equipped receiver aircraft.
  - Cobham 905E under-wing refuelling pods for probe-equipped receiver aircraft.
  - Cobham 805E Fuselage Refuelling Unit (FRU) for probe-equipped receiver aircraft
- Being refuelled
  - Universal Aerial Refuelling Receptacle Slipway Installation (UARRSI) for self in-flight refuelling.

The A330 MRTT has a maximum fuel capacity of 111,000 kg (245,000 lb) without the use of additional fuel tanks, leaving space for 45,000 kg (99,000 lb) of additional cargo. The A330 MRTT's wing has common structure with the four-engine A340-200/-300 with reinforced mounting locations and provision for fuel piping for the A340's outboard engines. The A330 MRTT's wing therefore requires little modification to use these hardpoints for the wing refuelling pods.

The A330 MRTT cabin can be modified to carry up to 380 passengers in a single-class configuration, allowing a complete range of configurations from maximised troop transport to complex customisation suitable for VIP and guest missions. Available configurations include 300 passengers in a single class and 266 passengers in two classes. The A330 MRTT can also be configured to perform Medical Evacuation (Medevac) missions; up to 130 standard stretchers can be carried. The main deck cargo configuration allows carriage of standard commercial containers and pallets, military, ISO and NATO pallets (including seats) and containers, and military equipment and other large items which are loaded through a cargo door. Like the A330-200, the A330 MRTT includes two lower deck cargo compartments (forward and aft) and a bulk area capability. The cargo hold has been modified to be able to transport up to eight military pallets in addition to civilian unit load devices (ULDs).

An optional crew rest compartment (CRC) can be installed in the forward cabin, accommodating a spare crew to increase time available for a mission. The passenger cabin of the A330 MRTT can be provided with a set of removable airstairs to enable embarkation and disembarkation when jet bridges or ground support equipment are not available.

Standard commercial A330-200s are delivered from Airbus's Final Assembly Line in Toulouse, France to the Airbus Military Conversion Centre in Getafe, Spain for fitting of refuelling systems and military avionics. The tanker was certified by Spanish authorities in October 2010. The first delivered aircraft (the third to be converted) arrived in Australia on 30 May 2011 and was formally handed over to the Royal Australian Air Force (RAAF) two days later on 1 June.

On 30 September 2016, Airbus Defence and Space completed the first flight of the new standard A330 MRTT. The new standard features structural modifications, aerodynamic improvements for a 1% fuel-burn reduction, upgraded avionics computers, and enhanced military systems. The first delivery was planned for 2018.

An Airbus/Saab team proposed an A330-based Airborne early warning and control (AEW&C) ("AWACS") variant with Saab's Erieye radar to the UK's Ministry of Defence in 2018 for the replacement of its Boeing E-3 Sentry fleet.

The boom operators sit at a video console using the Boom Enhanced Vision System. It uses a 3D camera vision system for day and night vision and ergonomics are significantly improved compared to operating in a prone position.

=== A330 MRTT+ ===
In November 2023, Airbus began derisking studies for an updated MRTT based on the A330neo, noting that A330-200 production ended in 2018 and very few airframes remain available for MRTT use. In particular, the company studied the feasibility of fitting the pods for the probe-and-drogue refuelling system onto the A330neo's new wing.

The new variant, dubbed MRTT+, was announced at the 2024 Farnborough Air Show. Based on the A330-800, and powered by Rolls-Royce Trent 7000 engines, the MRTT+ achieves 8% better fuel efficiency than the original MRTT. The first MRTT+ rolled out of the assembly line in September 2026.

== Operational history ==
The A330 MRTT has been ordered by Australia, France, the United Kingdom, the United Arab Emirates, Saudi Arabia, Singapore, South Korea, Spain, Canada, and by NATO in a multi-nation deal. Australia was the launch customer for the A330 MRTT. According to Airbus, the A330 MRTT has more than 90% in air-to-air refueling aircraft market outside the United States.

=== Australia ===
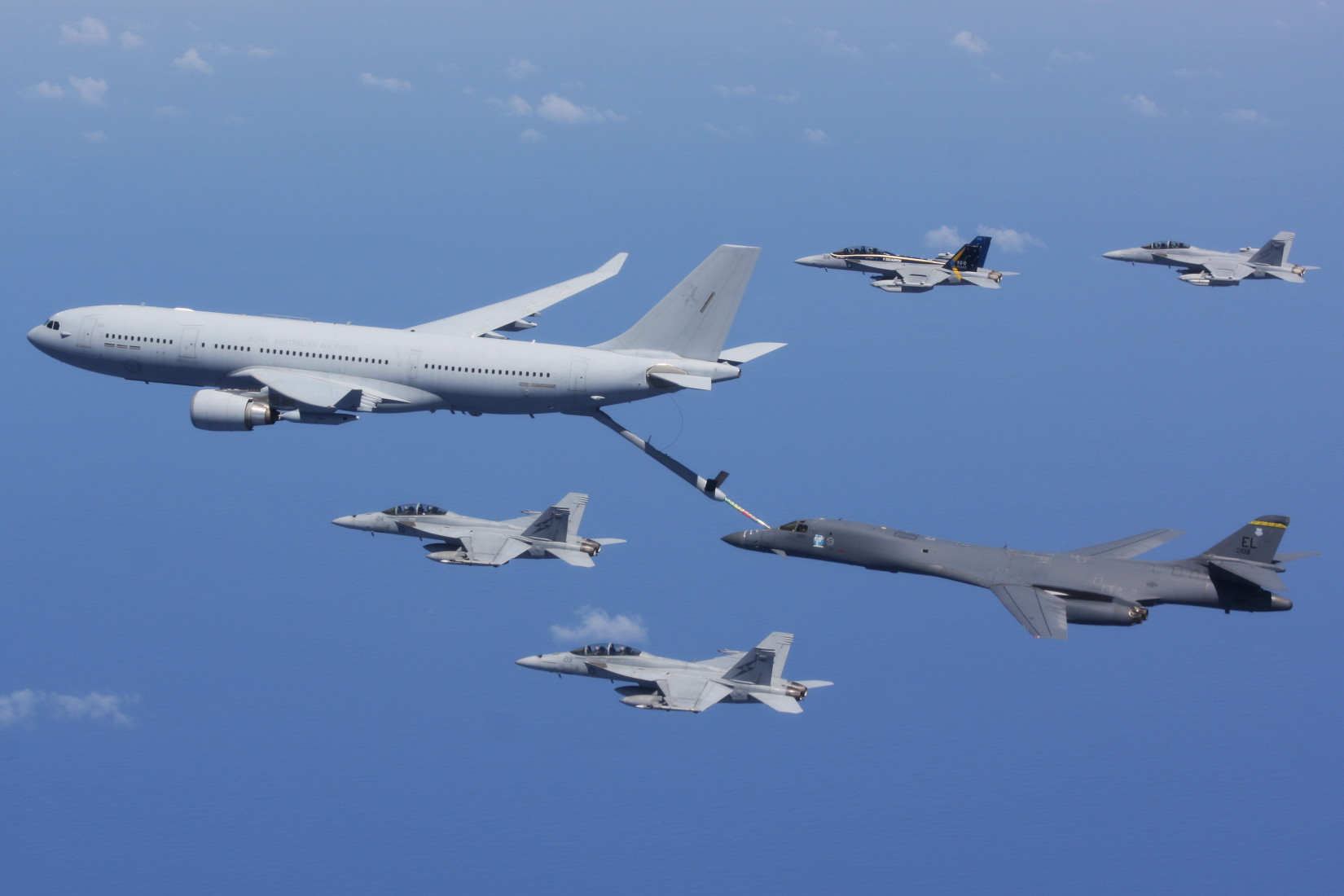
RAAF KC-30A refuelling a Rockwell B-1 Lancer with its centre refuelling boom, escorted by Boeing F/A-18F Super Hornets and Boeing EA-18G Growlers

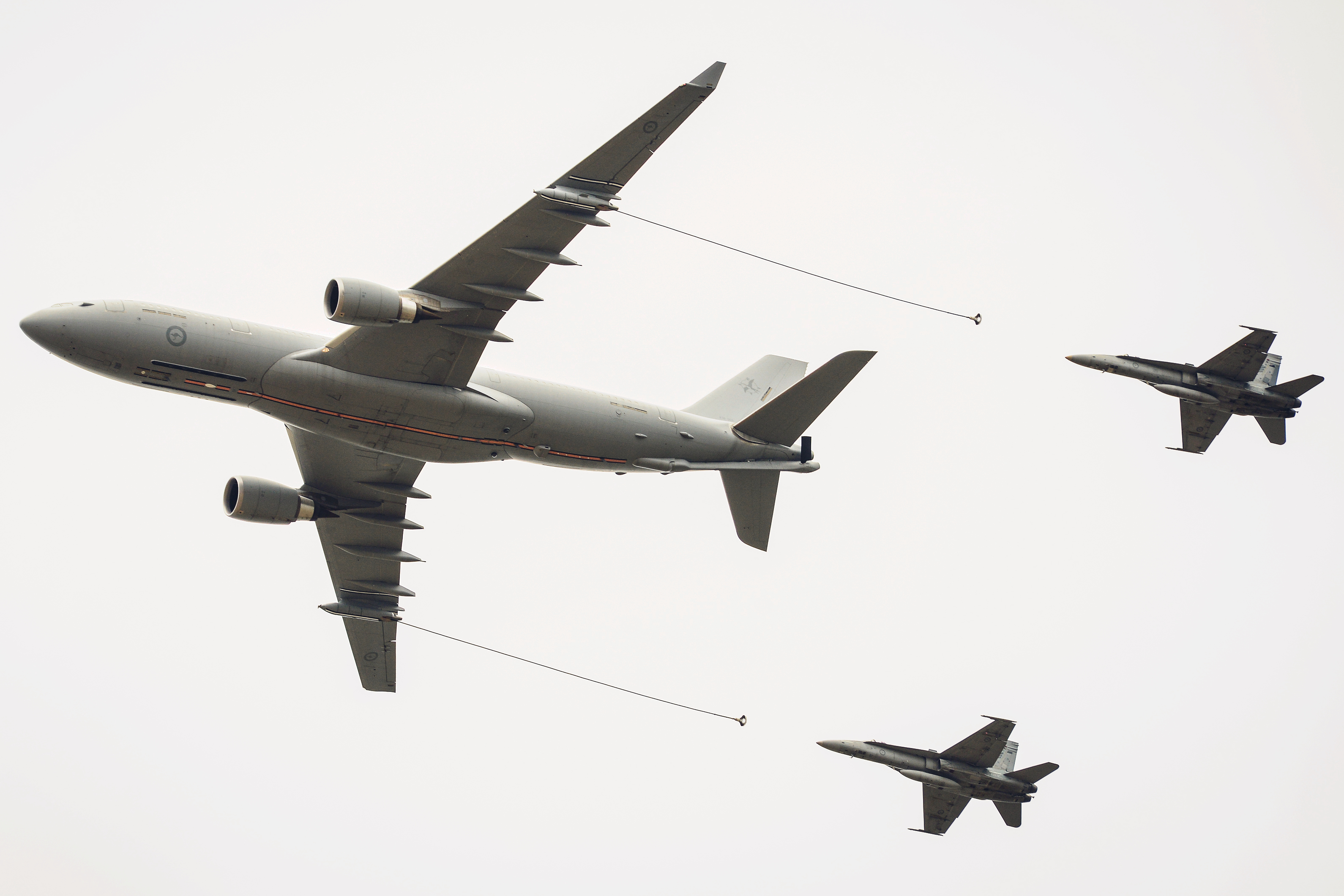
KC-30A refuelling demonstration with F/A-18A Hornets

Designated as KC-30A, the RAAF A330 MRTTs are equipped with both an Aerial Refuelling Boom System (ARBS) and two Cobham 905E under-wing refuelling pods. They are powered by two General Electric CF6-80E1A3 engines and are configured to carry up to 270 passengers plus 34,000 kilograms of cargo. Australia initially arranged to procure four MRTTs with an option to obtain a fifth; this option for a fifth was exercised to allow for two simultaneous deployments of two aircraft, the fifth being for contingency coverage. Australian KC-30As are operated by No. 33 Squadron RAAF, based at RAAF Base Amberley near Brisbane in Queensland.

In 2005, the RAAF expected deliveries to begin in 2008 and end in 2010. Deliveries fell two years behind schedule, partly due to boom development issues. On 30 May 2011, KC-30A RAAF serial A39-003, the third converted A330, arrived at RAAF Base Amberley and was formally handed over on 1 June 2011, thus becoming the first MRTT to be delivered to an end user. The second, A39-002, was handed over on 22 June 2011. On 3 December 2012, the fifth KC-30A was delivered to the RAAF. While the first conversion was performed in Spain, Qantas Defence Services converted the other four RAAF A330-200s at its Brisbane airport facility on behalf of EADS. In July 2013, there were reportedly delays to the KC-30A's full service entry due to refuelling issues, such as the hose-and-drogue system passing too much fuel.

In August 2013, the KC-30A made its debut as a VIP transport, ferrying Prime Minister Kevin Rudd and an entourage to Al Minhad Air Base in the United Arab Emirates. In August 2014, Defence Minister David Johnston announced the country's intention to buy two more KC-30As, one with a VIP layout for the Prime Minister's use. In July 2015, Defence Minister Kevin Andrews announced the order of two additional KC-30s, to be converted from A330-200s previously operated by Qantas, for delivery in 2018. In 2016, the decision was made to add a modest VIP fitout, including seating, meeting spaces and communication facilities, to a single KC-30A, which remains primarily used as a tanker. The 2016 Defence White Paper noted a possible rise in the fleet's size, to nine, to support new RAAF aircraft such as the Boeing P-8A Poseidon.

On 22 September 2014, the RAAF deployed an Air Task Group, including F/A-18F Super Hornets, a KC-30A and a Boeing E-7A Wedgetail AEW&C aircraft, to Al Minhad Air Base in the United Arab Emirates, as part of a coalition to combat Islamic State forces in Iraq. The KC-30A started operations days after arriving in the UAE, refuelling coalition aircraft over Iraq. On 6 October 2014, the RAAF conducted its first combat missions over Iraq via two Super Hornets, supported by the KC-30A.

In December 2016, an RAAF KC-30A conducted air-to-air refuelling trials with a USAF B-1B bomber.

The Australian Defence Magazine reported in July 2023 that the Australian Government was expected to announce an order for two additional KC-30As to increase the RAAF's fleet of the type to nine.

=== United Kingdom ===
In January 2004, the UK Ministry of Defence announced the selection of an A330 MRTT variant to provide tanking for the RAF for the next 30 years under the Future Strategic Tanker Aircraft (FSTA) programme, replacing the RAF's TriStar and VC10 tankers. The Ministry of Defence entered negotiations with the EADS-led AirTanker consortium. On 27 March 2008, a deal was signed to lease 14 MRTTs under a private finance initiative arrangement with AirTanker, with the first to enter service in 2011. The service's annual cost, including military personnel costs is around £450 million for a delivery of 18,000 flying hours a rate of approximately £25,000 per hour. There are two versions, designated Voyager KC.Mk 2 and Voyager KC.Mk 3; the former is fitted with two Cobham 905E under-wing refuelling pods, the latter with a Cobham 805E Fuselage Refuelling Unit (FRU) in addition to the under-wing pods; none are fitted with the Aerial Refuelling Boom System (ARBS). All Voyagers are powered by a pair of Rolls-Royce Trent 772B-60 engines.

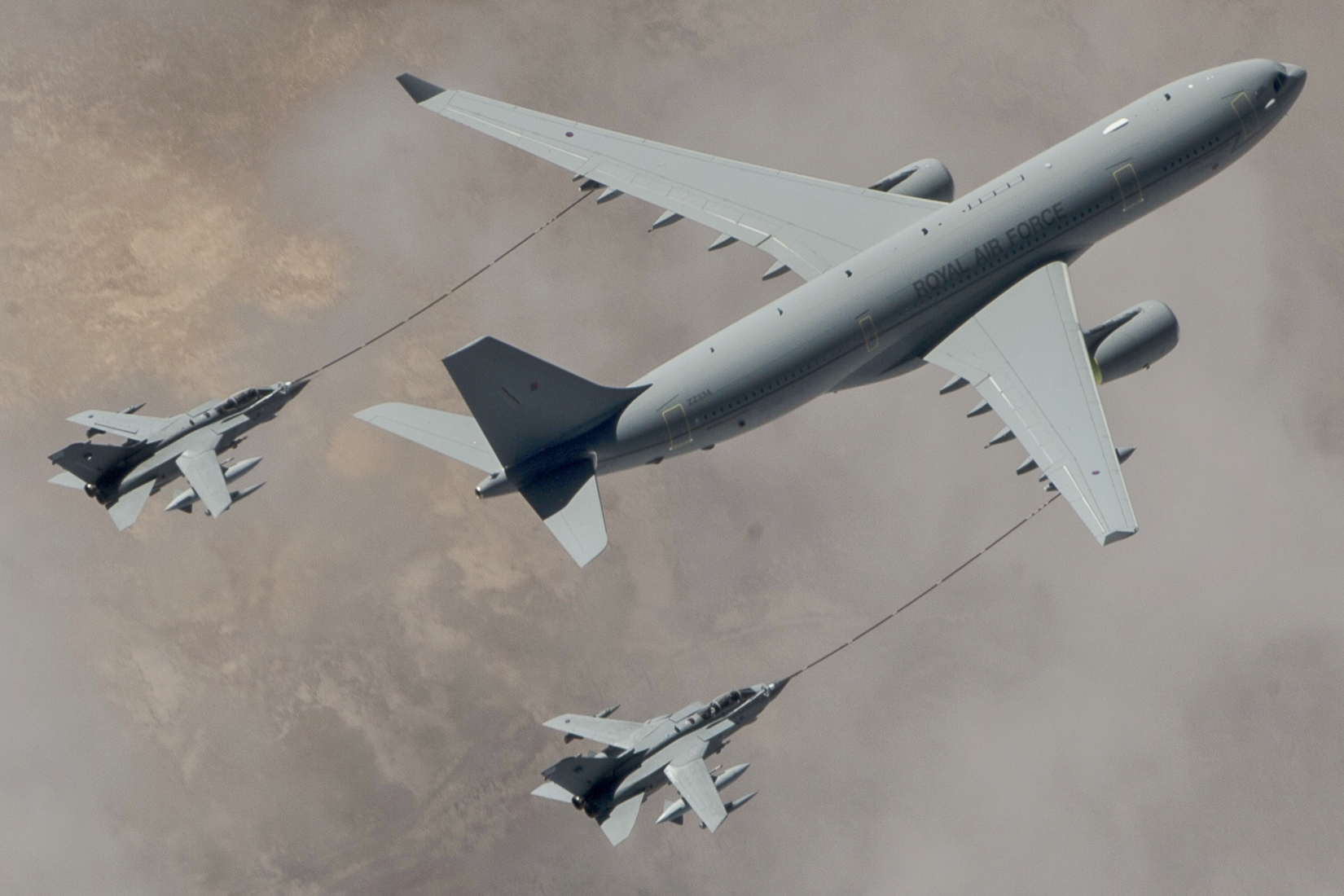
RAF Voyager KC3 refuelling two Tornado GR4s over Iraq

By May 2014, nine aircraft had been delivered, completing the core fleet. Further deliveries were for a "surge capability", available to the RAF when needed, but otherwise available to AirTanker for "release to the civil market, less its military equipment or to partner nations in a military capacity with the MoD's agreement". By 14 March 2016, all 14 Voyagers had been delivered. In November 2015, it was announced that a Voyager would be refitted to carry government ministers and members of the Royal Family on official visits. The refit cost £10m but was claimed to save roughly £775,000 annually compared to charter flights. ZZ336 is fitted with 158 seats (100 standard seats at the rear and 58 VIP seats at the front) and is known as Vespina; it entered service on 6 May 2016. Prime Minister David Cameron made his first flight on it to attend the 2016 Warsaw NATO summit. In June 2020, ZZ336 was repainted using the colours of the Union Flag at the request of Prime Minister Boris Johnson. Although undertaken as a part of routine maintenance, the cost was stated to be approximately £900,000.

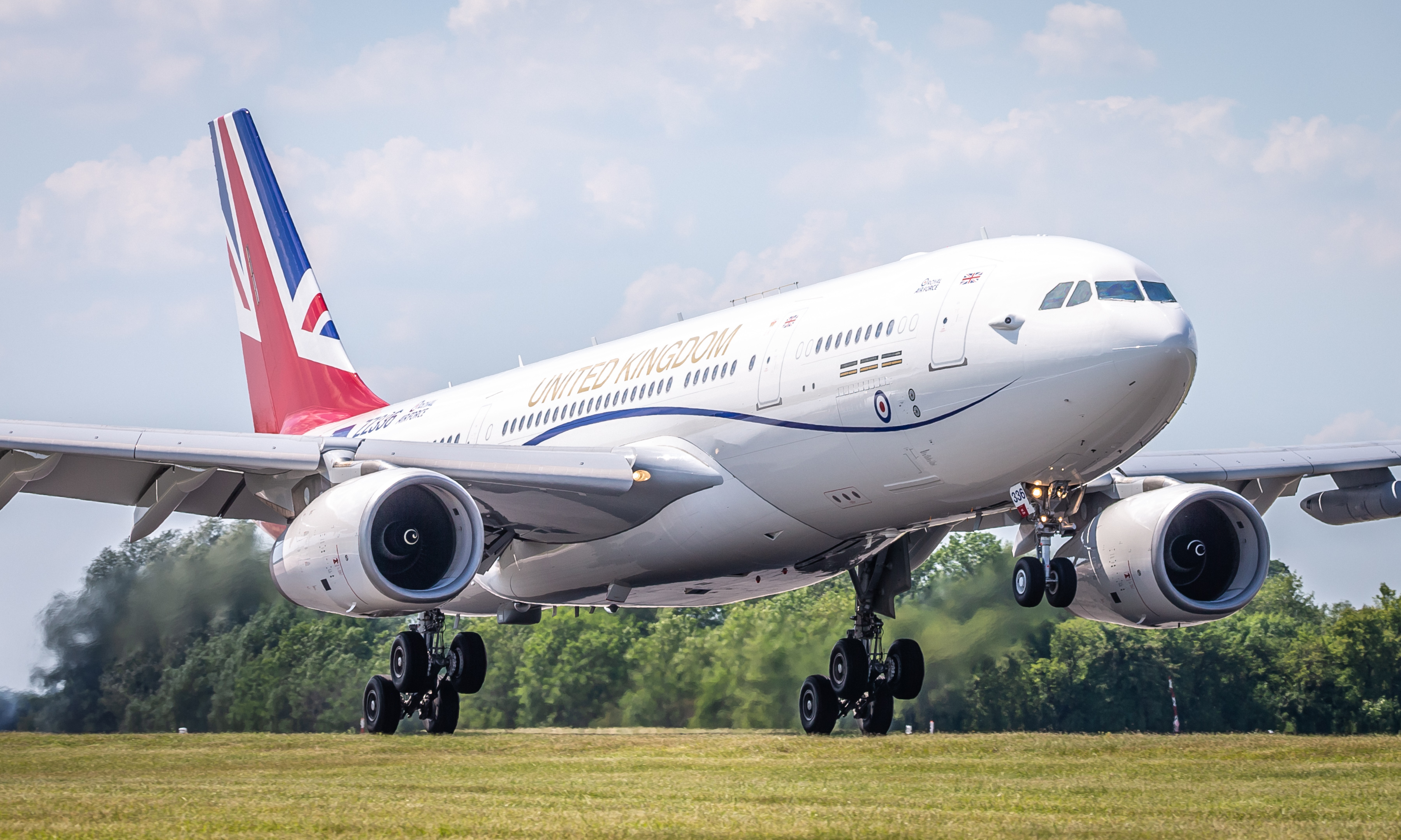
New livery for RAF ZZ336 "Vespina"

Because the RAF's Voyagers are only capable of probe-and-drogue refuelling, they are unable to refuel current or future RAF aircraft that are fitted solely for flying boom refuelling, including the Boeing RC-135, Boeing C-17 Globemaster III, Boeing 737 AEW&C and Boeing P-8 Poseidon. In April 2016, the RAF stated its interest in fitting a boom to some Voyagers, bringing its fleet into line with other MRTT operators. Fitting a boom would add flexibility to the RAF Voyagers, allowing refuelling of RAF aircraft not fitted for probe and drogue, and also by other air forces that operate boom-refuelled aircraft.

On 18 November 2022, an RAF Voyager completed the world's first 100% sustainable fuel military transporter flight, as part of the RAF's plan to become net-zero by 2040.

=== United Arab Emirates ===
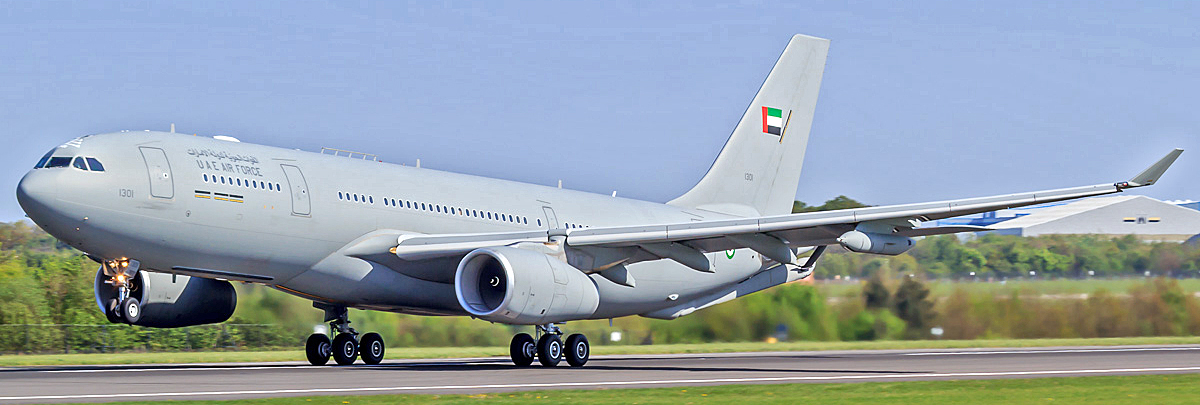
A UAE A330 MRTT in 2014

In 2007, the United Arab Emirates announced it had signed a memorandum of understanding with Airbus to purchase three A330 MRTTs. A contract was signed with the UAE in February 2008. The first UAE A330 MRTT was delivered on 6 February 2013. The remaining two were delivered by 6 August 2013. The UAE tankers are equipped with both an ARBS and two Cobham 905E under-wing refuelling pods; these ARBS units include a secondary boom hoist developed for the UAE. This system permits the boom to be retracted, even in the event of a primary boom retraction system failure. The UAE tankers are fitted with Rolls-Royce Trent 700 engines. On 14 November 2021, UAE ordered two additional MRTTs.

=== Saudi Arabia ===
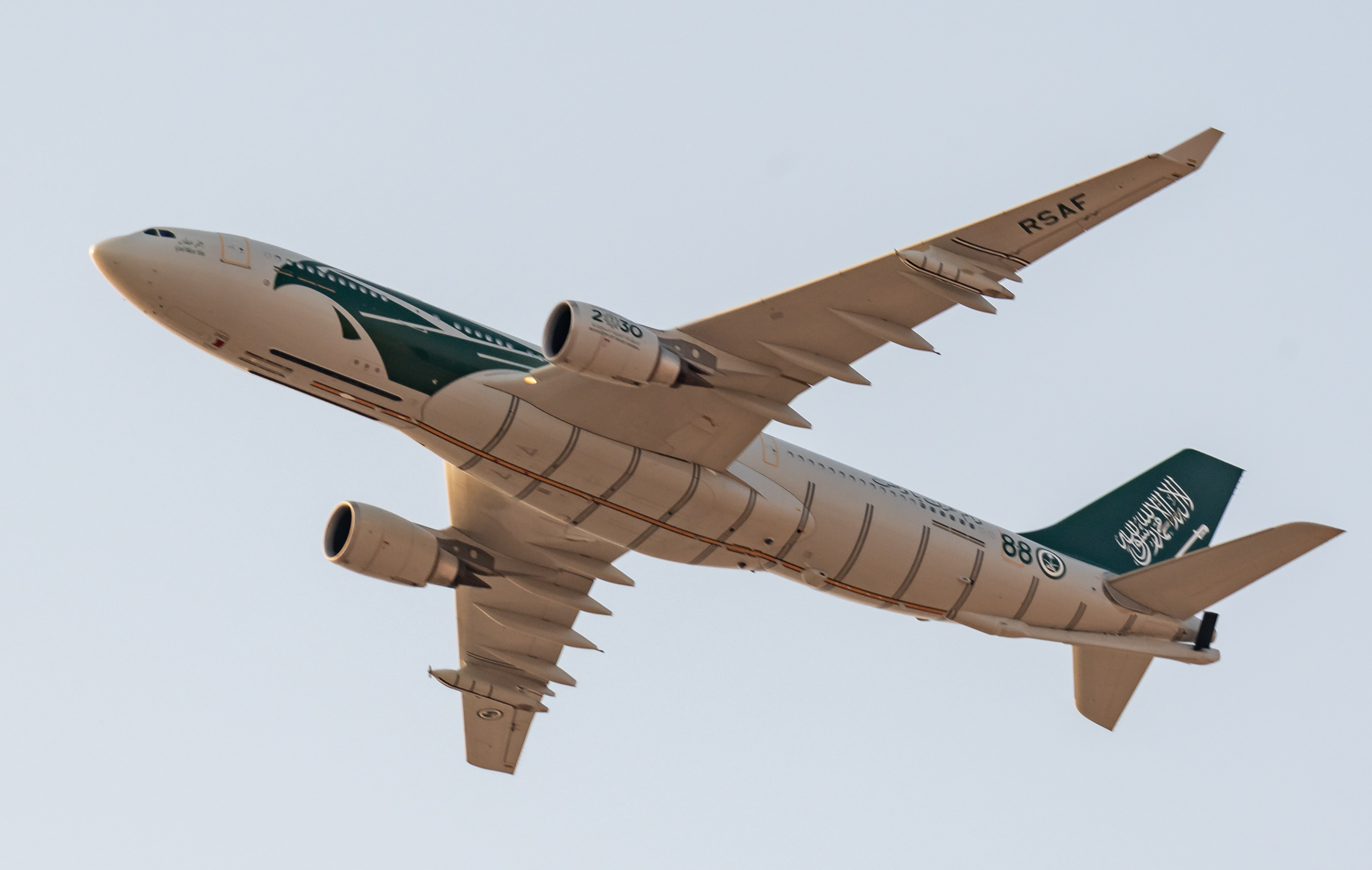
A Royal Saudi Air Force A330 MRTT in 2018

Saudi Arabia finalised an agreement to purchase three A330 MRTTs equipped with both an Aerial Refuelling Boom System (ARBS) and two Cobham 905E under-wing refuelling pods on 3 January 2008. In July 2009, it was announced that Saudi Arabia ordered three additional MRTTs. The Royal Saudi Air Force (RSAF) chose General Electric CF6-80 engines to power its A330 MRTTs.

On 25 February 2013, the first Saudi MRTT entered operational use. Three more MRTTs were ordered in a follow-on contract; delivery was expected in late 2014. By 31 August 2013, three had been delivered.

On 10 July 2024, four more MRTTs were ordered.

=== Singapore ===
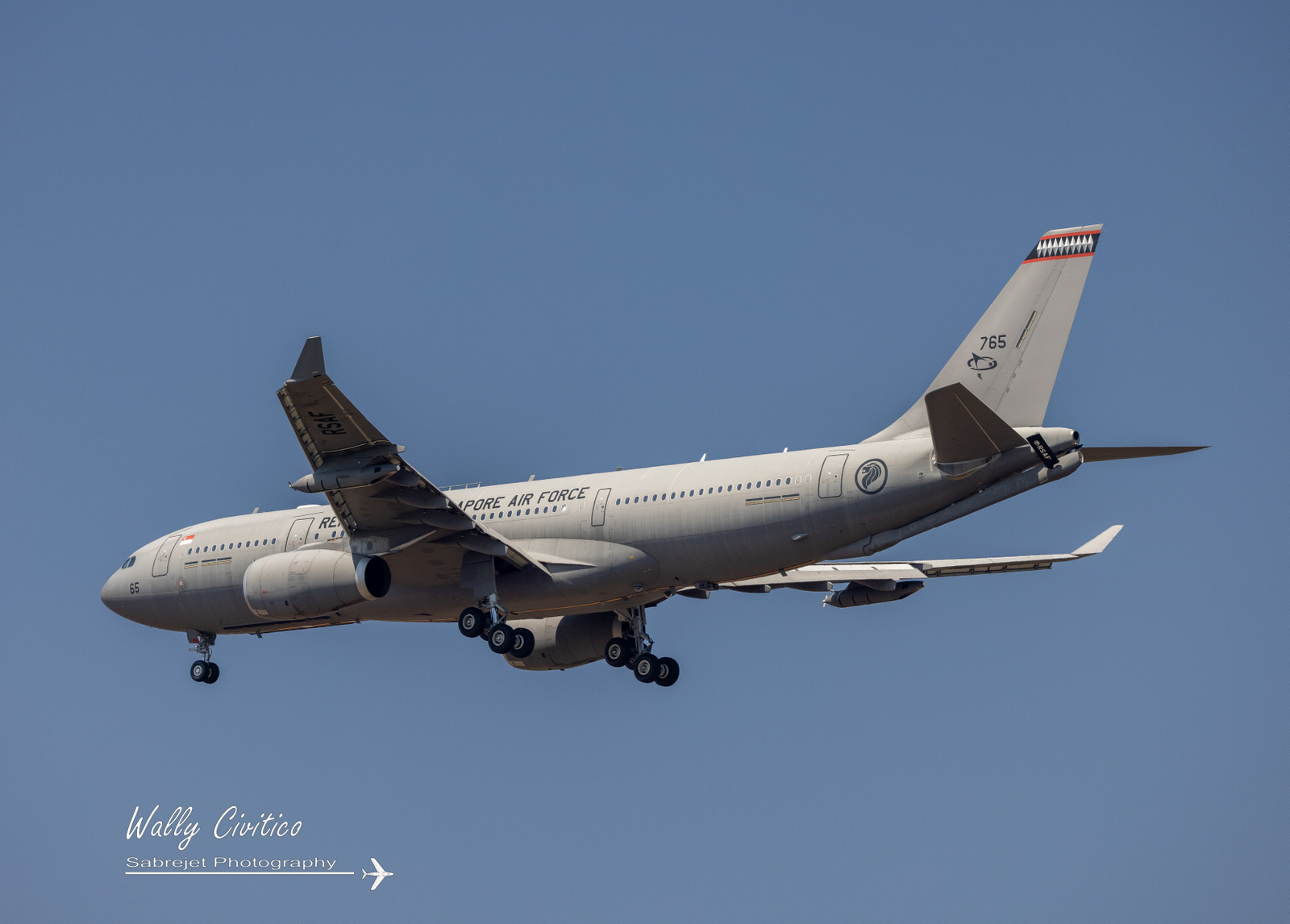
A Republic of Singapore Air Force A330 MRTT in 2022

In February 2012, Singapore expressed interest in the A330 MRTT to replace its four Boeing KC-135s. In February 2014, the Republic of Singapore Air Force (RSAF) selected the MRTT over the Boeing KC-46, signing for six aircraft. All are fitted with Trent 772B engines and configured for a maximum capacity of 266 passengers or 37,000 kilograms (82,000 lb) of cargo, as well as a maximum fuel weight of 111,000 kilograms (245,000 lb).

The first MRTT arrived in Singapore on 14 August 2018 in a special livery. It made its first public appearance at the RSAF's 50th anniversary parade on 1 September 2018. The RSAF's six MRTTs attained full operational capability (FOC) on 20 April 2021 and currently fly with the 112 Squadron at Changi Air Base (East) in Singapore.

=== South Korea ===
On 30 June 2015, South Korea selected the A330 MRTT; the Republic of Korea Air Force (ROKAF) planned to induct four aerial refueling tankers by 2020. The first MRTT was delivered on 12 November 2018, after a ferry flight from Airbus's final assembly line in Getafe, Spain to South Korea, piloted by a joint Airbus and ROKAF crew. South Korea received its second MRTT in March 2019 and the third in July 2019. These aircraft are powered by Rolls-Royce Trent 700 engines.

The aircraft is designated KC-330 Cygnus (ko). The ROKAF held a contest among their service members and chose the name 'Cygnus' after holding a deliberation committee session in November 2018 - January 2019. A few years later, one of the winners' confession revealed that he thought of the name Empress Cygnus, a character in the online game MapleStory. However, the condition of the contest was that only names related to space or birds (excluding birds of prey) would be accepted, but since the name of MapleStory's Cygnus is taken from the constellation Cygnus, which means swan in Latin, that claim has merit.

It extends the endurance of ROKAF aircraft over remote areas such as Dokdo, Ieodo, and the North Pyongyang-Wonsan Line, as well as increase its ability to deploy overseas for international operations.

It is not only aerial refueling, but also serves as a transport aircraft for the deployment of personnel, such as repatriation of remains from the Korean War, replacement of overseas troops, transfer of South Korean Iraqi residents due to COVID-19, transportation of Janssen vaccines, participated in Operation Oasis, which transfer of Cheonghae Unit members of the Munmu the Great when they contracted COVID-19, repatriation of General Hong Beom-do's remains and return to South Korea, participated in Operation Miracle, which transported cooperative Afghans, sent to import Diesel exhaust fluid from Australia to ease a supply shortage of the key material used in diesel vehicles, sent relief supplies and personnel to Turkey when the Turkey–Syria earthquake occurred, supported Operation Promise, which allowed Koreans to escape when the Sudanese war broke out, and helped fight Canadian wildfires so Canadian Prime Minister Justin Trudeau made a surprise visit to thank them for this, and the transportation of South Korean residents and travelers, 51 Japanese, and 6 Singaporeans in Israel due to the Israel-Hamas war.

=== France ===
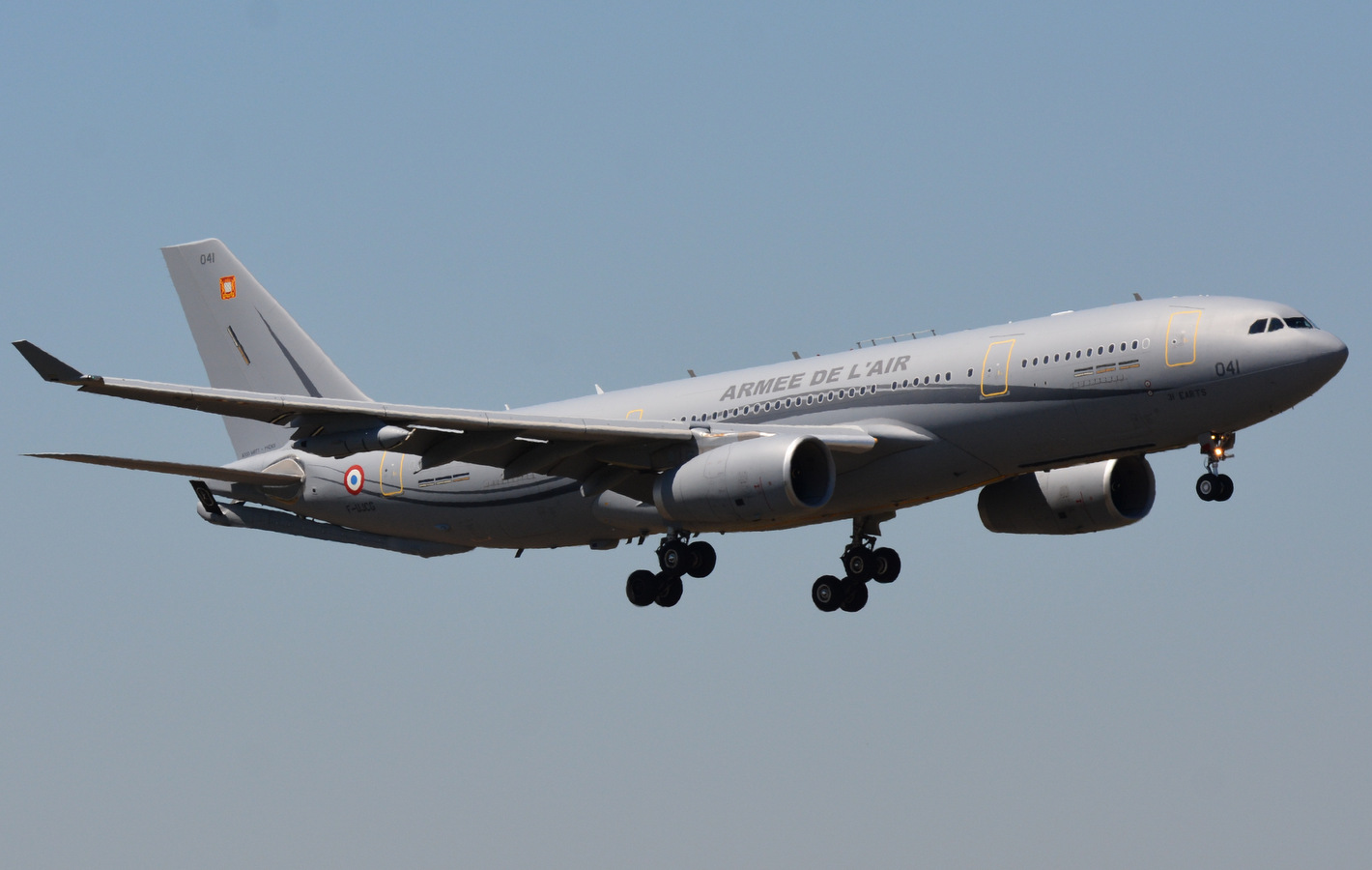
French Air and Space Force A330 MRTT Phénix

In November 2011, France expressed interest in acquiring 14 A330 MRTTs to replace its Boeing KC-135 tankers and Airbus A340 and A310 transports; one year later, it was announced that 14 would be ordered in 2013. In May 2013, Airbus made an offer for 12 to 14 A330 MRTTs to France. On 20 February 2014, the French Chief of Staff stated that 12 A330 MRTTs would be acquired in two batches, an initial standard configuration with a boom and wing refuelling pods and later with a cargo door and SATCOM. On 15 December 2015, France ordered eight MRTTs, constituting the second tranche of a multi-year contract for 12 MRTTs, worth €3 billion ($3.3 billion), signed by the French Ministry of Defence in November 2014. Initial deliveries were expected in 2018, with further handovers of one or two per year until 2025.

In September 2018, the Direction générale de l'armement (DGA) announced plans to speed up delivery of the MRTT Phénix, as it is known in French service, by two years, planning for the last of 12 aircraft to be delivered in 2023 rather than 2025. In addition, the DGA stated that the fleet would be later increased to 15 aircraft. Later in September, the French Air Force received the first MRTT as per the existing timetable. On 13 December 2018, France ordered another three MRTTs of a third tranche of the multi-year contract; these are powered by Rolls-Royce Trent 700 engines and equipped with the ARBS and underwing hose-and-drogue refuelling pods.

=== The Netherlands ===
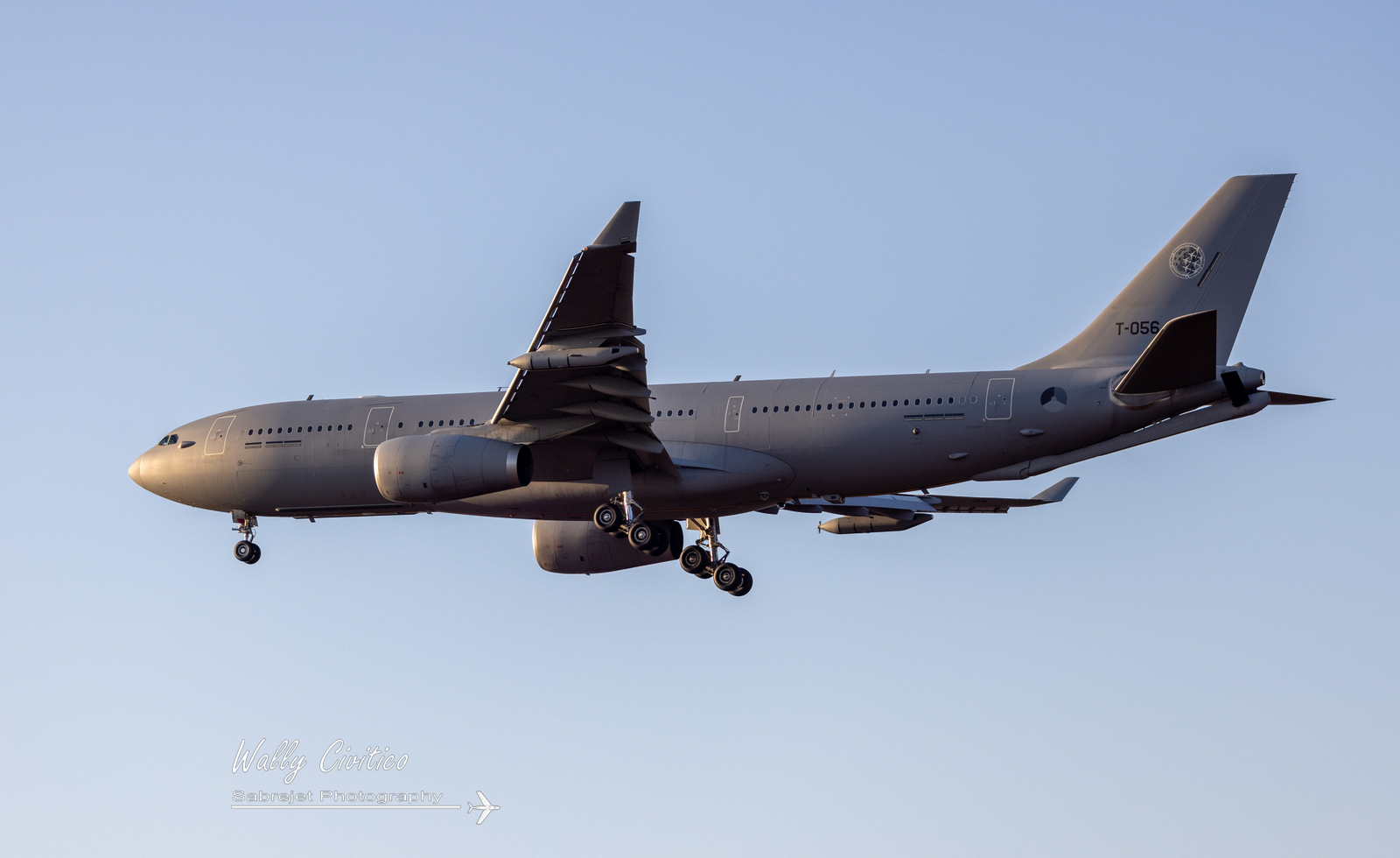
Dutch A330 MRTT in 2022

In November 2011, the European Defence Agency (EDA) Steering Board and European Defence Ministers endorsed air-to-air refueling (AAR) as one of the initial Pooling and Sharing initiatives after recognising the need for a greater AAR capability as it was heavily reliant on US Air Force tankers. In November 2012, the Ministers of Defence of 10 EDA member states (the Netherlands, Belgium, France, Greece, Spain, Hungary, Luxembourg, Poland, Portugal and Norway) signed a letter of intent to jointly procure a multi-role tanker transport. The Netherlands was designated leader of the newly launched Multinational Multi-Role Tanker Transport Fleet (MMF) project, which had the aim of creating an initial European AAR capability by 2020. In 2013, the Netherlands expressed interest in the A330 MRTT to replace its two KDC-10 aircraft; a study was launched on standardising European AAR capability in cooperation with other MFF members.

In December 2014, following a request for information, the bulk of the MMF member states entered negotiations with Airbus to procure a MRTT fleet to be owned by NATO while the Organisation for Joint Armament Cooperation (OCCAR) and the NATO Support and Procurement Agency (NSPA) would support the procurement process. This was accompanied by a request for proposals sent by OCCAR to Airbus for two MRTTs with options for six more; only the Netherlands and Luxembourg were full MMF members at this point. It was decided to base these MRTTs at Eindhoven Air Base, which has noise clearance to operate up to eight MRTTs. In July 2016, the Netherlands and Luxembourg jointly ordered the first two MRTTs under the MMF programme, the first scheduled for delivery by 2020. In June 2017, Germany and Norway became MMF members, pledging to order five more MRTTs plus options for a further four. On 26 September 2017, Airbus announced receipt of OCCAR's firm order for five additional MRTTs.

The Belgian Ministry of Defence stated the intent to buy one MRTT in a 2015 defence plan. The Belgian government investigated the €840 million plan, as well as the option of equipping Belgium's seven A400Ms with under-wing pods; a combined Belgian A330 MRTT and A400M fleet would cost up to €1 billion. On 22 December 2017, Belgium signed a contract for one MRTT, to be based at Eindhoven Air Base, bringing the MMF to eight aircraft. and officially joined the programme on 14 February 2018.

On 19 December 2017, NATO partnered with Israel's Elbit Systems to provide J-Music electronic countermeasures systems to the fleet. Having considered joining the initiative for some time, the Czech Republic joined as the sixth member during October 2019. In September 2020, Luxembourg committed to an extra 1,000 hours and to provide funding for a ninth MRTT via an existing contract option.

As of 2018, Sweden was reportedly considering joining the Multinational Multi-Role Tanker Transport Fleet programme.

Out of the total of ten aircraft currently on order, six will be based at Eindhoven Air Base in the Netherlands and four at Cologne Bonn Airport in Germany. On 30 June 2020, Airbus delivered the first MRTT. Aircraft six and seven were delivered on 26 and 28 July 2022 respectively. On 23 March 2023, the MMF was declared Initial Operational Capable during a ceremony at Eindhoven Air Base. Additionally, Belgium announced a €265 million increase in the program's funding, after which a MoU contract was signed for a tenth MRTT by the Ministers of Defence of the Netherlands, Belgium, Luxembourg and Norway. Then the NSPA formally ordered an additional MRTT, increasing the MMF to 10 aircraft.

In 2023, the Multinational MRTT Fleet began integrating the J-Music Directed Infrared Countermeasure (DIRCM) system developed by Elbit Systems into its aircraft. This provides protection against heat-seeking missiles such as MANPADS, using fiber-laser and high-speed thermal imaging technologies. This upgrade enhances the fleet's survivability during operations in high-threat environments.

The Netherlands government organised multiple flights with the multinational pool planes in transport configuration to repatriate Dutch nationals from Israel after the initial attacks of the Gaza war disrupted commercial air traffic to Israel.

On 25 March 2025, the Danish Ministry of Defence confirmed its intention to join the program with the equivalent of two refuelling units, raising the prospects of addition of more aircraft to the program. On 24 June 2025, it was announced that an additional 2 A330 MRTTs would be ordered with deliveries set for 2028 and 2029, bringing the total to 12 aircraft, and that Denmark and Sweden would be joining the programme. A third operating MMF base is planned in Denmark, and in December 2025 Karup Air Force base was selected. On 7 July 2026, Finland joined the program.

=== Spain ===
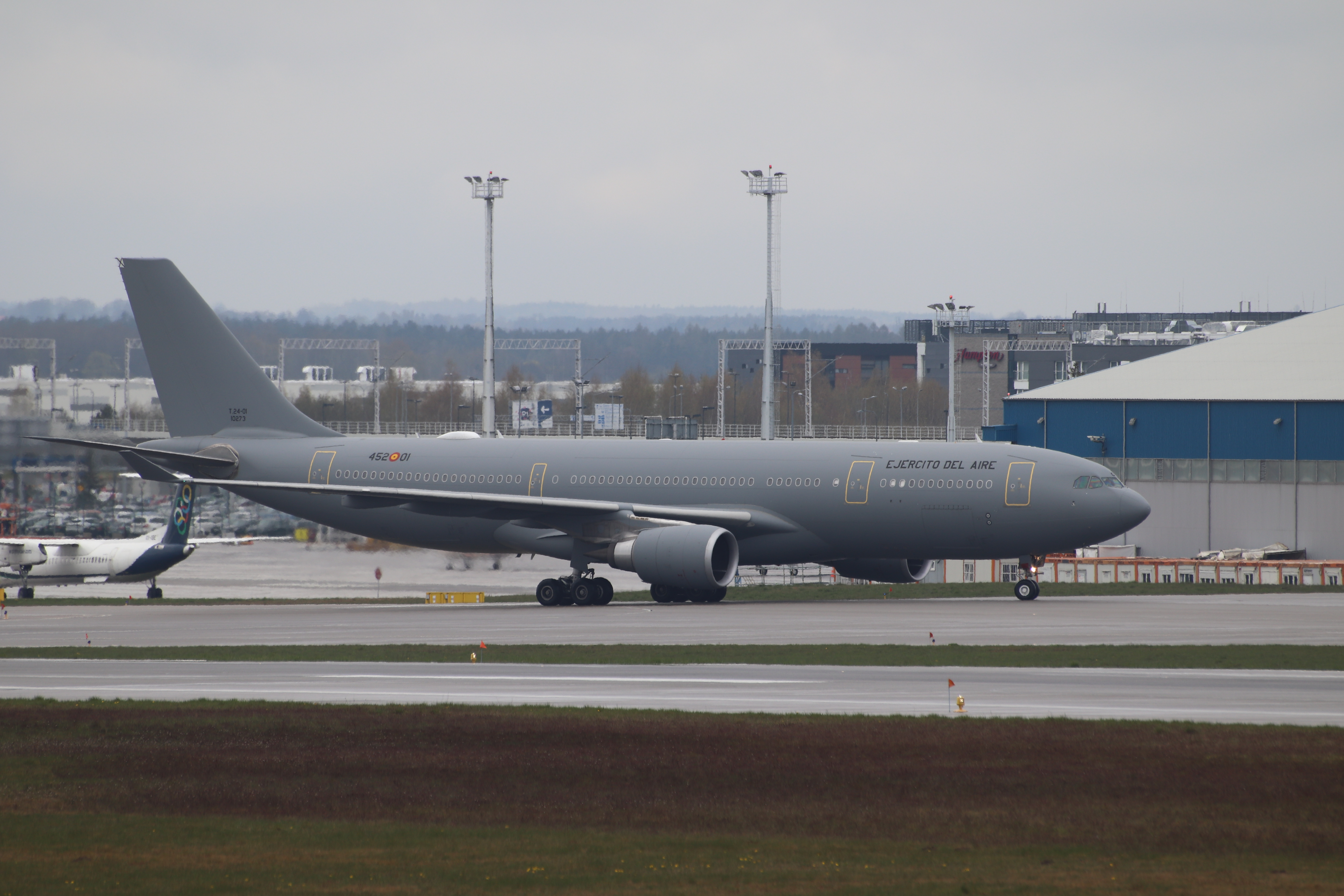
Spanish A330 prior to conversion

Spain's Ministry of Defence stated that it was to acquire two A330 MRTT in 2016 to replace its ageing Boeing 707 tankers. In 2014, Spain's Secretary of State for Defence stated that negotiations had begun with Airbus about switching its excess order for 13 Airbus A400Ms to an undisclosed number of MRTTs. The Airbus Defence and Space commercial director said that although it was a difficult issue, the company would negotiate with Spain to reach an agreement. In September 2020, Spain agreed to buy from Iberia three A330s no longer needed due to the economic impact of the COVID-19 pandemic, then modify them to serve as a MRTT fleet. On 12 November 2021, Spain signed an order for three MRTTs from Airbus.

Between 2021 and 2022, the first two aircraft entered service in original passenger configuration, the third aircraft was sent directly to the conversion facility at Airbus Getafe. The first A330 MRTT is scheduled for delivery by the end of 2024, while the other two are delayed for conversion and delivery until 2025 and 2026 so that there will always be two aircraft in service. Beginning in January 2024, the first MRTT aircraft performed test flights. The first Airbus A330 MRTT for the Spanish Air and Space Force entered service in April 2025. A second aircraft was delivered in late October 2025.

In August 2026, Poland and Spain decided to jointly purchase seven A330 MRTT+ aircraft, three for Spain, four for Poland, worth €5.4 billion. Poland will receive four aircraft by 2030.

=== Brazil ===
On 28 January 2021, Brazilian President Jair Bolsonaro announced negotiations for two A330 MRTT for the Brazilian Air Force. On 13 May 2021, the Ministry of Defence released a statement authorizing the deal, reportedly from the RAF's active inventory. On 30 June 2021, the British military attaché for Brazil, Royal Navy Captain Mark Albon, confirmed the ongoing negotiations, conducted by the UK ambassador to Brazil and Ministry of Defence officials. On 27 January 2022, the Brazilian Air Force ended negotiations with the RAF and launched international bidding to buy two A330-200s on the civil market, estimated at US$81 million.

On 6 April 2022, Azul Brazilian Airlines was declared the supplier by the Ministry of Defence. The agreements with Airbus, conversion costs and delivery schedule were kept confidential. Conversion work into A330 MRTTs was to be carried out at Airbus's plant in Getafe, Spain. The aircraft were to be fitted with two Cobham 905E under-wing pods and a Cobham FRU-805E fuselage refuelling unit, and based at the Galeão Air Force Base in Rio de Janeiro. VIP transport is also a possibility, in order to replace the Airbus A319ACJ in presidential trips requiring intercontinental range. Both airplanes were designated C-330 prior to the tanker conversions; upon completion of the conversions, they will be redesignated KC-30.

=== Canada ===
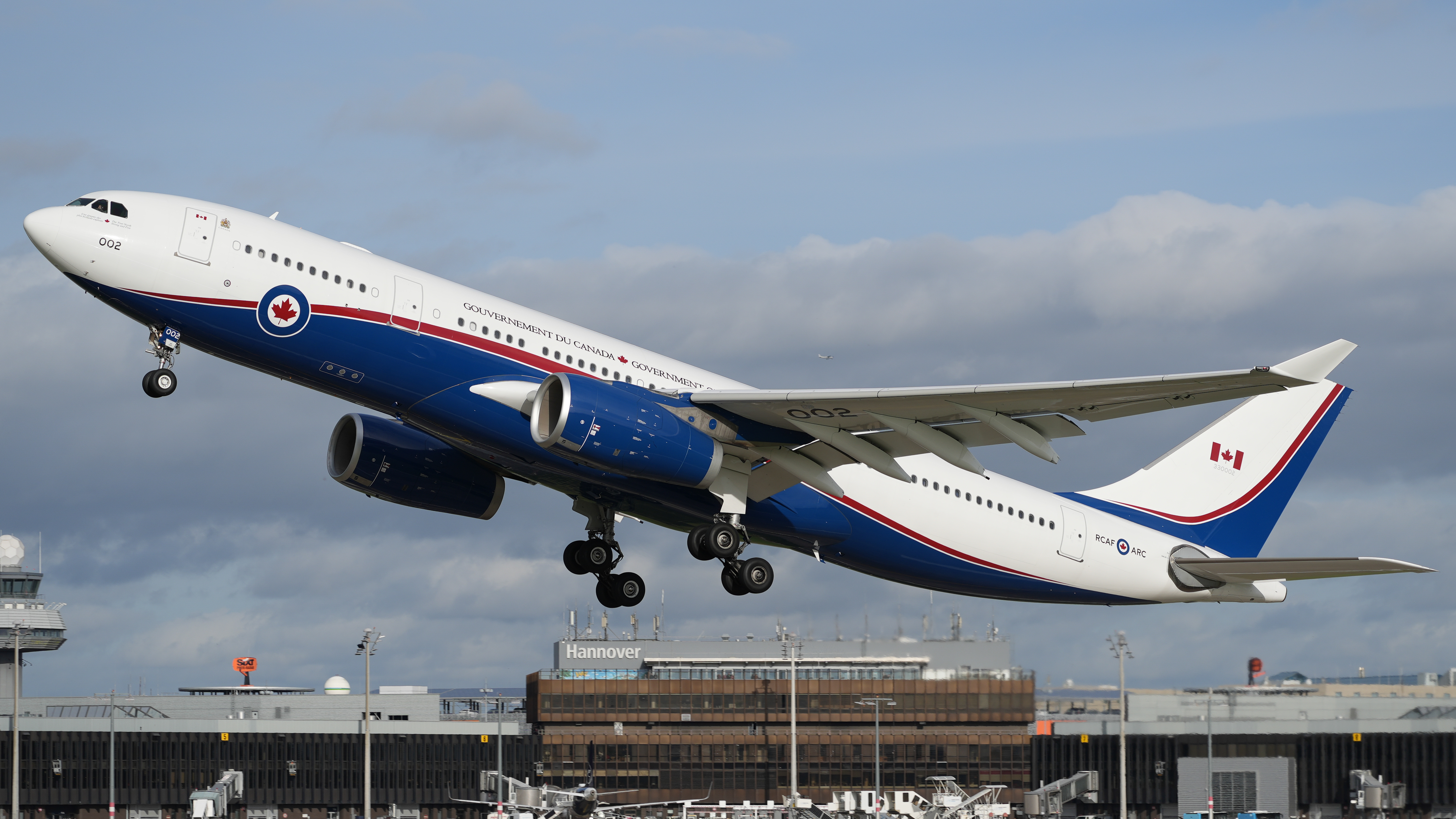
A CC-330 Husky taking off

In April 2021, Airbus was declared the only qualified supplier to replace Canada's RCAF CC-150 Polaris refuelling and VIP transport aircraft, beating out Boeing's KC-46 Pegasus. In July 2022, a $102M deal was finalised to acquire two used A330-200s from the International Airfinance Corporation for passenger/cargo-only use. The aircraft were expected to be converted into MRTTs by Airbus in the future; up to four more MRTTs were to be acquired, for a total of six aircraft. This total was revised in July 2023 to nine, with a fleet made up of five conversions and four newly manufactured MRTTs in a contract worth C$3.6 billion. The A330 MRTTs are designated CC-330 Husky by the RCAF, and the first passenger/cargo-only aircraft was delivered on 31 August 2023 in Ottawa.

=== Thailand ===
Thailand's Royal Thai Air Force ordered 1 aircraft, to be delivered in 2029. This was the first order of the new A330 MRTT+ variant, an evolution of the MRTT using the Airbus A330neo platform.

=== Italy ===
After cancelling the purchase of the KC-46, Italy in August 2024 launched a tender to procure six tankers with a budget of €1.4 billion. On 19 May 2026, it was announced that the Italian Air Force had ordered six Airbus A330 MRTT for a total value of €1.6 billion.

=== Poland ===
In December 2025, it was revealed that Poland was considering the purchase of two to four A330 MRTT+s. In August 2026, Poland and Spain decided to jointly purchase seven A330 MRTT+ aircraft, three for Spain, four for Poland, worth €5.4 billion. Poland will receive its four aircraft by 2030.

=== Potential operators ===
==== India ====
A tender or the Request for Proposal (RfP) for further procurement of six FRAs was launched in 2006 and was sent to Lockheed Martin, Boeing, EADS (now, Airbus) and Ilyushin. The Airbus A330 MRTT was selected against Il-78MKI after the technical and commercial evaluation in May 2009. The others did not respond to the tender. However, the tender, worth ₹6,000 crore (equivalent to ₹150 billion or US$1.6 billion in 2026), had been scrapped in January 2010 due to the finance ministry’s concerns over bid competitiveness and the MRTT’s pricing. While Ilyushin offered a better price, IAF sought the MRTT due to its better capabilities.

Another tender, worth ₹9,000 crore (equivalent to ₹140 billion or US$1.5 billion in 2026), was launched on 16 September 2010 and requests for proposal were sent to all the vendors involved earlier along with Antonov. While Lockheed Martin and Boeing did not respond to the tender, Antonov had been disqualified on technical fields. The commercial bids from Airbus and Ilyushin was opened in November 2012 where the quoted base price for Il-78 was lower than A330 MRTT. However, the MRTT had a better value and was selected as L1 bidder when maintenance and fuel costs were included as factors. This calculation was as per the government’s new Life‑Cycle Cost (LCC) evaluation in its new Defence Procurement Procedure (DPP) of 2008—which assesses total ownership costs over an aircraft’s service life. By January 2013, India chose the MRTT as the "preferred bid" after a series of flight tests which included refuelling multiple fighter jet types using the aircraft along with operations from high-altitude airbases. Airbus expected the deal to be finalised by the end of that year. However, in July 2016, Airbus was notified by the Indian MoD that the RFP was again retracted. After ceasing negotiations and scrapping the $2 billion worth tender due to "very high" life cycle costs as well as objections for the LCC calculations, the Indian Air Force also considered "direct strategic purchase" of the FRAs for its immediate requirements. The new FRA fleet was to be based at Panagarh Air Force Station in the eastern sector. Another factor for cancellation was an ongoing CBI probe in India on a separate deal that Aribus signed with India's Civil Aviation Ministry. Airbus was cleared of allegations in 2024.

On 25 January 2018, the Indian Air Force launched a Request for Information (RFI) after two earlier tenders were cancelled within a duration seven years. The responses were to be submitted within 30 March. While the No. 78 Squadron is based at Agra Air Force Station in the West, the new fleet will be stationed at Panagarh Air Force Station in the East. The RFI was sent to Boeing, Airbus and Ilyushin. However, as the document specified the requirement of two-engine aircraft with two-man cabin crew, Il-78MKI was disqualified. Both Boeing and Airbus responded to the request with KC-46 Pegasus and A330 MRTT, respectively. Reportedly, the tender following the RFI was expected to have 30 percent mandatory direct defense offset clause.

On 6 April 2022, Hindustan Aeronautics Limited (HAL) signed an agreement with Israel Aerospace Industries (IAI) to convert six Boeing 767 commercial airliners into Multi Mission Tanker Transport (MMTT) in India. However, Boeing has to grant permission for such a conversion.

As of 7 February 2024, the Defence Ministry was "considering" the ₹10,000 crore (equivalent to ₹110 billion or US$1.1 billion in 2026) acquisition proposal from the Indian Air Force. The Defence Acquisition Council (DAC) – chaired by Defence Minister Rajnath Singh – cleared the acquisition under 'Buy Global' category enabling procurement from both foreign or Indian vendors.

On 28 March 2025, the Indian Ministry of Defence signed a contract with Metrea Management to supply one Boeing KC-135 Stratotanker on wet lease to the IAF within six months for training pilots of IAF and the Indian Navy for in-flight refuelling. The refuelling jet landed at Agra Air Force Station on 21 November.

==== Indonesia ====
In January 2018, Indonesian Air Force (TNI-AU) officials were reportedly studying both the A330 MRTT and Boeing KC-46 Pegasus tankers for a future modernisation programme, expected to take place after completion of the Airbus A400M Atlas programme. The TNI-AU was said to compare compatibility with its current aircraft; life-cycle costs; interoperability with current and future assets; and potential funding and technology transfer options with state-owned aircraft manufacturer Indonesian Aerospace. On 5 September 2023, the Indonesian Ministry of Defense stated that a number of defense equipment made by Airbus are in effective contract including the Airbus A330 MRTT.

==== United States ====
A consortium of Lockheed Martin and Airbus proposed a variant called LMXT for the Bridge Tanker Competition referred to as KC-Y, which could lead to a contract to build up to 160 aircraft.

In October 2023, Lockheed Martin withdrew from the consortium, leaving Airbus to make the bid alone.

==== Turkey ====
Since 2025, Turkey has been evaluating the Airbus A330 MRTT and the KC-46 Pegasus to replace its fleet of seven Boeing KC-135 Stratotanker aerial refueling aircraft. As of 2026, no procurement decision has been publicly announced.

==== Others ====
On 27 March 2014, Airbus announced that the Qatar Emiri Air Force intended to purchase two A330 MRTTs.

In May 2021, it was revealed that Egypt was considering the purchase of two A330 MRTTs as part of a Rafale fighter deal with France.

=== Failed bids ===
==== United States ====
The US Air Force (USAF) ran a procurement programme to replace around 100 of its oldest KC-135E Stratotankers, i.e., initially excluding the more common updated KC-135R variant. EADS offered the A330 MRTT. The Boeing KC-767 was selected in 2002; however the USAF cancelled the KC-767 order upon the uncovering of illegal manipulation and corrupt practices during the competition.

In 2006, the USAF released a new request for proposal (RFP) for a tanker aircraft, which was updated in January 2007, to the KC-X RFP, one of three acquisition programmes that are intended to replace the entire KC-135 fleet. The A330 MRTT was proposed again by EADS and Northrop Grumman as the KC-30. It again competed against the Boeing KC-767, a smaller and less expensive aircraft with less fuel and cargo capability. Northrop Grumman and EADS announced plans to assemble the aircraft at a new facility in Mobile, Alabama, which would also build A330 freighters. On 29 February 2008, the USAF announced the selection of the KC-30 as the KC-135 replacement, and was designated KC-45A. On 18 June 2008, the United States Government Accountability Office (GAO) upheld a protest by Boeing on the contract's award to Northrop Grumman and EADS over process improprieties. This left the status of the KC-45A in doubt, because the GAO decision required the USAF to rebid the contract.

On 24 September 2009, the USAF began the first steps in the new round of bids, with a clearer set of criteria. On 8 March 2010, Northrop Grumman withdrew from the bidding process, asserting that the new criteria were skewed in favour of Boeing's offering. On 20 April 2010, EADS announced it was re-entering the competition on a stand-alone basis and intended to enter a bid with the KC-45, still intending for Mobile to be the final assembly site. On 24 February 2011, the USAF announced that the development contract had been awarded to Boeing. William J. Lynn III, the deputy defence secretary, said Boeing was "the clear winner" under a formula that considered the bid prices, how well each tanker met needs and the operating costs over 40 years.

== Variants ==
=== Based on A330-200 ===
A330 MRTT
An Airbus A330-200 converted by Airbus Military for air-refuelling duties.
CC-330 Husky
Royal Canadian Air Force designation for an A330 MRTT with two under-wing refuelling pods and an Aerial Refuelling Boom System.
KC-30A
Royal Australian Air Force designation for an A330 MRTT with two under-wing refuelling pods and an Aerial Refuelling Boom System.
KC-45A
United States Air Force designation for an A330 MRTT with two under-wing refuelling pods and an Aerial Refuelling Boom System, order cancelled.
KC-330 Cygnus
Republic of Korea Air Force designation for an A330 MRTT with or without two under-wing refuelling pods and an Aerial Refuelling Boom System.
Voyager KC2
Royal Air Force designation for an A330 MRTT with two Cobham 905 under-wing pods, primarily used for refuelling fast jets.
Voyager KC3
Royal Air Force designation for an A330 MRTT with two under-wing pods and a "Cobham Fuselage Refuelling Unit (FRU)" for a centreline refuelling capability, primarily used for refuelling large aircraft.

=== Based on A330-800 ===
A330 MRTT+
Update of the base airframe to the A330-800

== Operators ==
Map with A330 MRTT operators in blue; Multinational Multi-Role Tanker Transport Fleet (MMF) operators are also included.

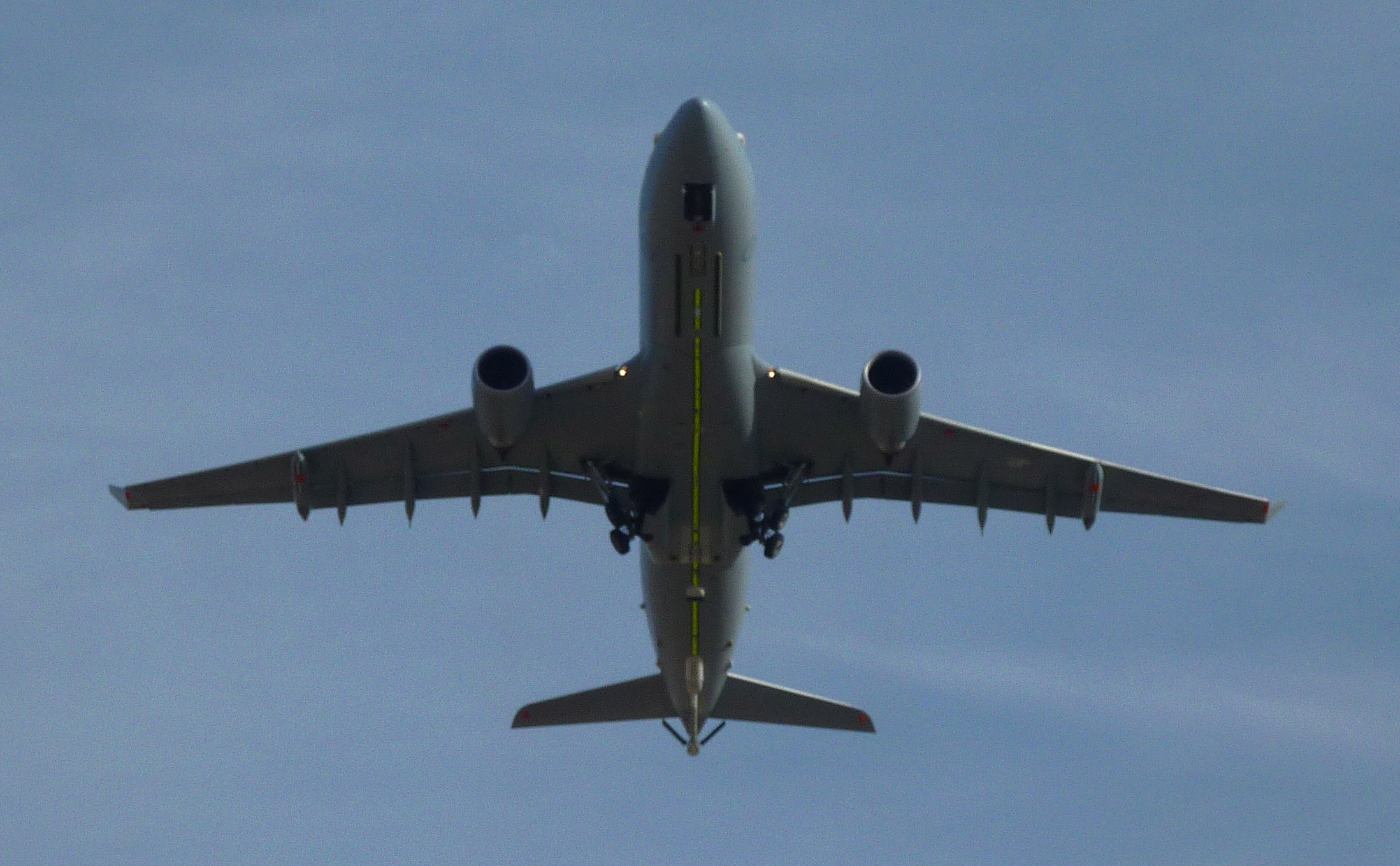
The first A330-200 MRTT for the Royal Australian Air Force (RAAF) taking off for a test flight from Getafe Air Base in Spain

As of 31 August 2026, a total of 91 A330 MRTT had been ordered from Airbus Defence and Space. 66 have been delivered.

=== Current operators ===
Australia
Royal Australian Air Force – 7 operational.
- RAAF Base Amberley
  - No. 33 Squadron
France
French Air and Space Force – 15 aircraft ordered, 13 delivered.
Netherlands
Royal Netherlands Air and Space Force – 12 aircraft ordered, 10 delivered as of September 2026 for the MMF.
The A330 MRTT are officially registered as Dutch military aircraft, but they are used as a shared pool of tankers. The countries financing and benefiting from the fleet are: Belgium, Czech Republic, Denmark, Finland, Germany, Luxembourg, Norway, Sweden and the Netherlands.
Saudi Arabia
Royal Saudi Air Force – 6 operational, 4 aircraft on order.
- No. 24 Squadron
Singapore
Republic of Singapore Air Force – 6 operational.
- No.112 Squadron
South Korea
Republic of Korea Air Force – 4 operational.
- 5th Air Mobility Wing
Spain
Spanish Air and Space Force – 3 operational
- 45th Wing, at Torrejón Air Base, Madrid
United Arab Emirates
United Arab Emirates Air Force – 5 operational.
- Air Refuelling Squadron
United Kingdom
Royal Air Force – 14 delivered (seven KC2s, five KC3s, and two fitted out as KC3s).
The aircraft are owned by the AirTanker Services (commonly known as AirTanker), which operates or wet-leases out aircraft that not required by RAF tasking.
- No. 10 Squadron, at RAF Brize Norton, Oxfordshire
- No. 101 Squadron, at RAF Brize Norton, Oxfordshire
- No. 1312 Flight, at RAF Mount Pleasant, Falkland Islands – 1 x Voyager KC2

=== Orders ===
==== A330 MRTT ====
Brazil
Brazilian Air Force – 2 former civilian aircraft ordered 2022 (order not listed in Airbus O&D report as of 31 August 2026).
Canada
Royal Canadian Air Force – 9 ordered as Airbus CC-330 Husky, consists of four new build and five conversion airframes. Eight aircraft will be configured as true multi-role tanker transports (in operational grey livery), while one aircraft will undergo VIP configuration (in white livery).
- 437 Transport Squadron
Italy
Italian Air Force – 6 ordered (order listed as Undisclosed in Airbus O&D report as of 31 August 2026).

==== A330 MRTT+ ====
Poland
Polish Air Force – 4 ordered (order not listed in Airbus O&D report as of 31 August 2026).
Spain
Spanish Air and Space Force – 3 ordered (order not listed in Airbus O&D report as of 31 August 2026).
Thailand
Royal Thai Air Force – RTAF has ordered an Airbus A330 Multi Role Tanker Transport Plus (MRTT+), the final delivery to customer in 2029.

== Accidents and incidents ==
On 19 January 2011, an air refuelling accident occurred between a boom-equipped A330 MRTT and a Portuguese Air Force General Dynamics F-16 Fighting Falcon over the Atlantic Ocean off the coast of Portugal. Early reports indicated that the boom broke off at the aft end of the boom near the F-16's receptacle, causing the boom to recoil into the MRTT's underside. The boom then became uncontrollable and oscillated until it broke off the boom assembly at the pivot point. Both aircraft were damaged but landed safely. The A330 MRTT involved was an Airbus test aircraft destined for the RAAF, operated by an Airbus crew. At the time of the incident, Airbus had not yet begun deliveries.

On 10 September 2012, an A330 MRTT's refuelling boom detached in flight at an altitude of 27,000 ft (8,200 m) in Spanish airspace. The boom separated cleanly at a mechanical joint and fell to the ground, while the tanker landed safely in Getafe without any injuries. The fault was attributed to a conflict between the backup boom hoist (fitted to the UAE-destined MRTTs) and the primary boom retraction mechanism, as well as to the test conducted. Airbus later explained that the malfunction was not possible under ordinary operating conditions, and that procedures had been implemented to avoid similar incidents in the future. Following the incident, the Instituto Nacional de Técnica Aeroespacial, Spain's airworthiness authority, issued precautionary restrictions to other users of boom-equipped A330s.

On 9 February 2014, a Royal Air Force A330 MRTT Voyager carrying 189 passengers and 9 crew from RAF Brize Norton to Camp Bastion suddenly lost 4,440 ft (1,350 m) of altitude in 27 seconds and reaching a maximum descent rate of 15,000 ft/min (4,600 m/min) while the co-pilot was out of the cockpit. The sudden descent caused several injuries to passengers and crew, some of whom struck the ceiling of the aircraft. The co-pilot returned to the cockpit, regained control, and the aircraft diverted to Incirlik Air Base and landed without further incident. The incident resulted in the grounding of the entire RAF Voyager fleet for 12 days until it was determined that the event was caused by the captain's improperly stowed DSLR camera being jammed between the captain's armrest and the side-stick, forcing the stick forward when the captain adjusted his seat forward.

On 20 June 2025, members of the Palestine Action activist group infiltrated RAF Brize Norton in an act of protest towards the United Kingdom's support of Israeli Gaza war actions. The group sprayed red paint on the airframes and engines of two MRTTs using tools such as a modified fire extinguisher. The grounding of the aircraft, which were stated to be damaged, would not impact the RAF's mission; with Armed Forces Minister Luke Pollard stating that "the activities of the RAF were unaffected".

== Specifications ==
Parameters	A330 MRTT (A330-200 base)	A330 MRTT Plus (A330-800 base)
	General characteristics	
Crew	2 pilots 1 AAR (additional crews when used on transport, medical or other types of missions)	
Empty weight	125,000 kg (276,000 lb)	N/A
MTOW	233,000 kg (514,000 lb)	251,000 kg (553,000 lb)
Length	58.80 m (192 ft 11 in)	58.38 m (191 ft 6 in)
Height	17.40 m (57 ft 1 in)	17.39 m (57 ft 1 in)
Wingspan	60.30 m (197 ft 10 in)	64.00 m (210 ft 0 in)
Wing area	362.0 m^{2} (3,897 sq ft)	372 m^{2} (4,000 sq ft)
Fuel capacity	111,000 kg (245,000 lb)	139.09 m^{3} (4,912 ft^{3}) (111,800 to 116,800 kg (246,500 to 257,500 lb))
Engines	2 × Rolls-Royce Trent 772B; 2 × 316 kN (71,000 lbf)	Rolls-Royce Trent 7000; 320 kN (72,000 lbf)
Engines	2 × General Electric CF6 (80E1A3 or E1A4B variants); 320 kN (72,000 lbf)	Rolls-Royce Trent 7000; 320 kN (72,000 lbf)
Engines	2 × Pratt & Whitney PW 4168A; 2 × 305 kN (69,000 lbf)	Rolls-Royce Trent 7000; 320 kN (72,000 lbf)
	Mission capacity	
Fuel offload (various mission scenarios)	70,000 kg (150,000 lb) at 1,250 nmi (2,320 km; 1,440 mi) from base, with 1 hours on station	N/A
Fuel offload (various mission scenarios)	65,000 kg (143,000 lb) at 1,000 nmi (1,900 km; 1,200 mi) from base, with 2 hours on station	N/A
Fuel offload (various mission scenarios)	50,000 kg (110,000 lb) at 1,000 nmi (1,900 km; 1,200 mi) from base, with 4 hours on station	N/A
Fuel offload (various mission scenarios)	Ferry flight support of 4 fighter aircraft on a 2,800 nmi (5,200 km; 3,200 mi) flight	N/A
Refuelling pods (under wings)	2 × Cobham 905E: Used to refuel transport aircraft with a probe (A400M, C295); Maximum fuel flow: 1,300 kg/min (2,900 lb/min); Hose length: 25.90 m (85.0 ft); Operating envelope: 185 to 350 kn (343 to 648 km/h; 213 to 403 mph)	N/A
Under-fuselage refuelling units	1 × Cobham 805E FRU: Used to refuel transport aircraft with a probe (A400M, C295); Maximum fuel flow: 1,800 kg/min (4,000 lb/min); Hose length: 25.90 m (85.0 ft); Operating envelope: 185 to 350 kn (343 to 648 km/h; 213 to 403 mph)	N/A
Refuelling boom (under fuselage)	1 × Airbus Military ARBS: Used to refuel aircraft equipped with a receptacle; Maximum fuel flow: 3,600 kg/min (7,900 lb/min); Operating envelope: 180 to 325 kn (333 to 602 km/h; 207 to 374 mph)	N/A
Refuelling receptacle (atop fuselage)	Optional UARRSI (refuelled by boom)	Optional UARRSI (refuelled by boom)
Payload (non-fuel)	45,000 kg (99,000 lb) of which 37,000 kg (82,000 lb) in the cargo bay	N/A
Transport capacity	Two lower deck cargo compartments (forward and aft / rear bulk area); 27 LD3, or 8 pallets (NATO 2.23 m (88 in)×2.74 m (108 in)	Two lower deck cargo compartments (forward and aft / rear bulk area); 27 LD3, or 8 pallets (NATO 2.23 m (88 in)×2.74 m (108 in)
Passenger capacity	Up to 300 passengers Germany: 267; Singapore: 266, United Kingdom: 291	N/A
Medical configzration capacity	6 intensive care beds + 34 patient beds 20 medical staff seats 100 passengers	N/A
	Aircraft performances	
Cruise speed	870 km/h (540 mph; 470 kn)	870 km/h (540 mph; 470 kn)
Ferry range	8,700 nmi (16,100 km; 10,000 mi)	N/A
Service ceiling	12,500 m (41,000 ft)	N/A

== See also ==
Related development

- Airbus A330
- Airbus A310 MRTT
- Airbus CC-330 Husky
- EADS/Northrop Grumman KC-45

Aircraft of comparable role, configuration, and era

- Boeing KC-767
- Boeing KC-46 Pegasus
- Ilyushin Il-96-400TZ

Related lists

- List of tanker aircraft
