= Royal Canadian Air Force VIP aircraft =

Aircraft to transport Canadian royals, leaders and dignitaries

The Royal Canadian Air Force (RCAF) maintains specialised aircraft to transport Canada's monarch and/or other members of the royal family (at which time the aircraft is designated as the Royal Flight), the governor general, prime minister, other senior members of the Government of Canada, and other dignitaries. A small fleet of dedicated executive government transport aircraft are organised into two RCAF squadrons. Other RCAF combat and transport helicopters and fixed-wing aircraft, chartered civilian aircraft, and occasionally scheduled commercial flights may also be used to meet Canada's VIP air transport requirements.

== History ==
Members of the royal family have been flying in the United Kingdom since two Westland Wapitis were delivered to the Royal Air Force's No. 24 Squadron at RAF Northolt in April 1928. Between the following year and 1935, Prince Edward, Prince of Wales, himself purchased 13 aircraft; he became the first member of the royal family to be a pilot and, when he acceded to the throne in 1936 as King Edward VIII, the King's Flight was formed as the world's first head of state aircraft unit.

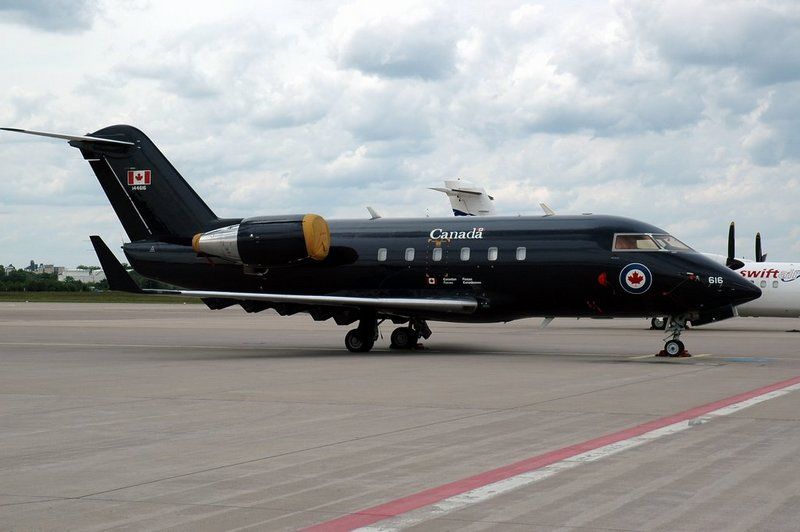
Challenger 601 used as a VIP transport by the Royal Canadian Air Force

Staff prepare meals for Queen Elizabeth II and Prince Philip, Duke of Edinburgh, aboard a Canadian Forces Air Command CC-150 Polaris Royal Flight, en route to the Queen's engagements for her Golden Jubilee in 2002

Executive air transport in Canada can be traced to the formation of the Royal Canadian Air Force (RCAF) in the 1920s; the only Very Important Person (VIP) death in the history of the RCAF was Minister of National Defence Norman McLeod Rogers on 10 June 1940, near Newtonville, Ontario. The RCAF maintained aircraft such as the Lockheed Lodestar, Canadair North Star, Canadair CL-66, and Canadair CL-44-6 until, following the 1968 unification of the country's three armed forces branches into the Canadian Forces, long range VIP transport was carried out using a modified Boeing 707 designated as the CC-137 Husky and short range VIP transport used various combat fixed and rotary wing aircraft. Dedicated VIP transport aircraft did not enter the Canadian Forces until the early 1980s, when 12 CL-600S Challenger business jets were purchased by the Governor General-in-Council from Canadair, which were thereafter given the designations CC-144, CE-144, and CX-144, and painted in the contemporary red and white livery of the Canadian Forces. These jets flew with 414 "Black Knight" Squadron at CFB North Bay until July 1992, and with 434 "Blue Nose" Squadron at CFB Greenwood until May 2000, when eight aircraft were either sold or retired, the remaining two being transferred to 412 Transport Squadron for dedicated executive transport, where the livery was changed to a dark Air Force blue.

At times, the use of executive air transport has been a contentious issue. In 2002, the Governor General-in-Council, on the advice of Prime Minister Jean Chrétien, purchased two additional Challenger jets for exclusive royal, viceregal, and ministerial transport. Use of these planes by ministers of the Crown came under heavy criticism, partly due to the high cost of operation—approximately CAD$11,000 per hour—as well as questions over prioritisation of other military aircraft procurement. Government ministers have typically explained that the use of the Challenger jets is necessary, due to time constraints and/or security issues. Also, Governor General Adrienne Clarkson had used a chartered aircraft to fly from Ottawa to her cottage in Muskoka, Ontario, and it was later revealed that Governor General Michaëlle Jean was flown to The Bahamas on a Canadian Forces Challenger. Both times, the press reports of these actions brought criticism towards the vicereines from some corners; however, the governor general's mode of transport is directed by the Royal Canadian Mounted Police.

== Present arrangements ==
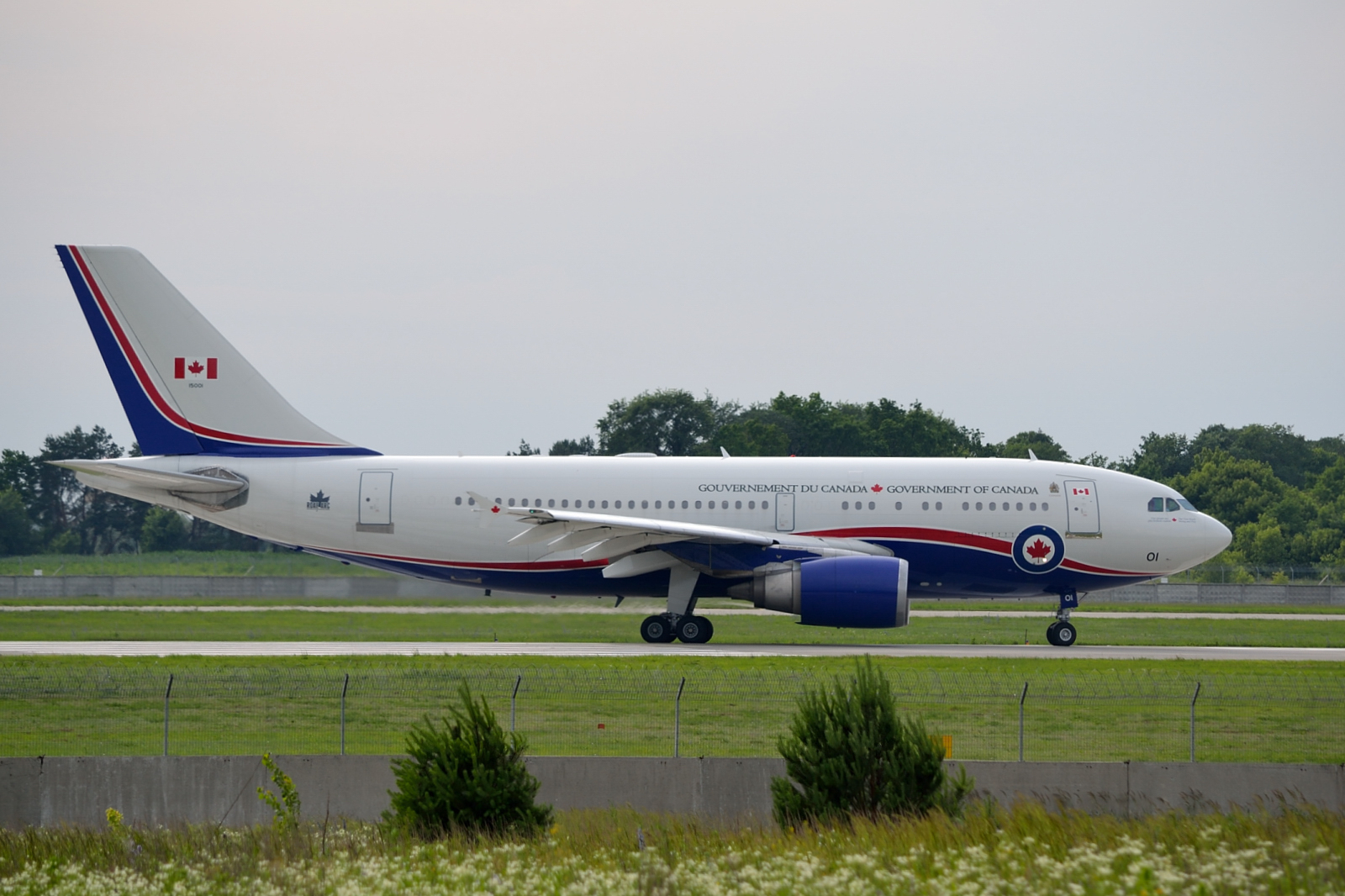
CC-150 Polaris No. 001 in 2014

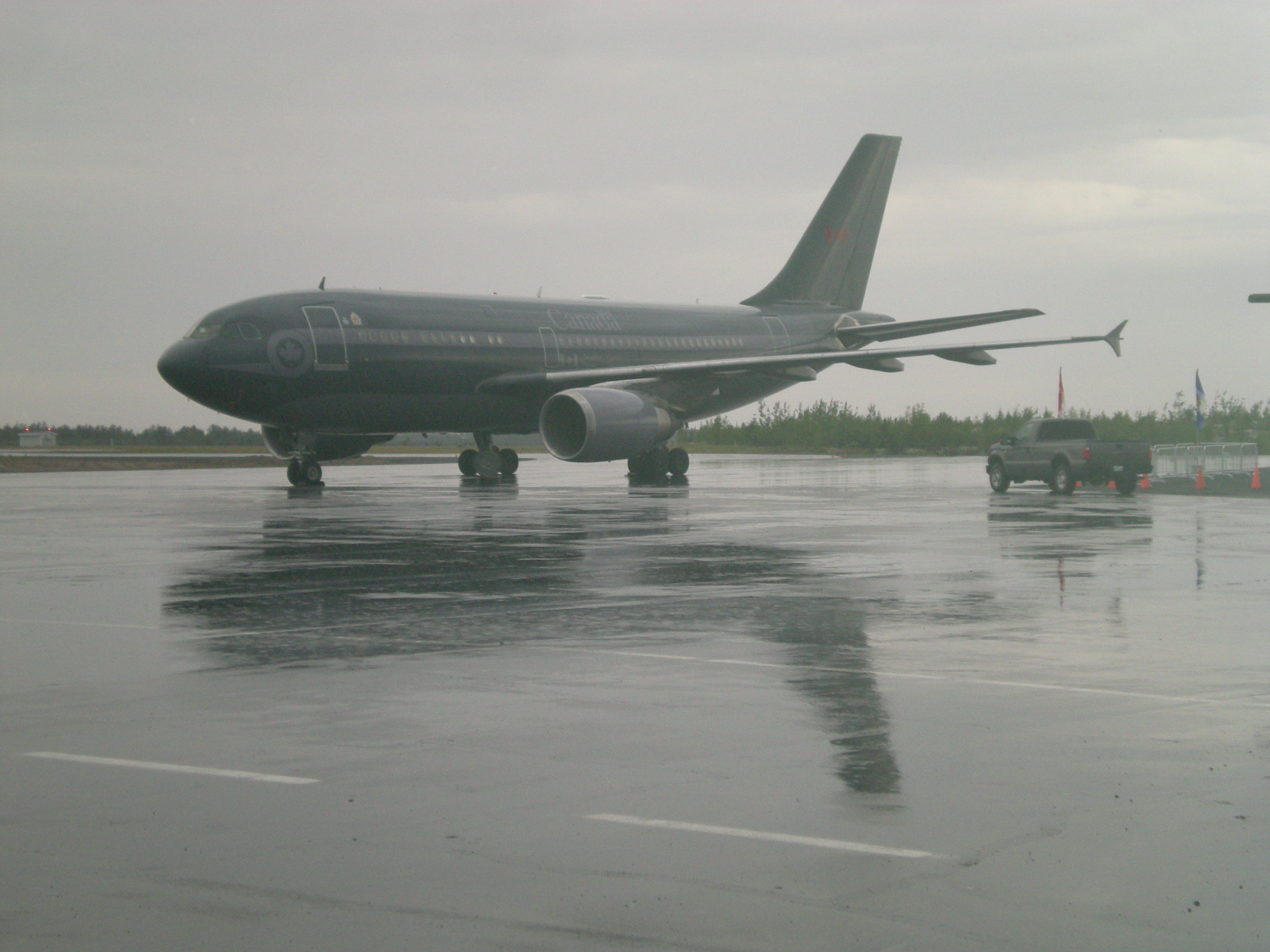
RCAF CC-150 Polaris at Yellowknife Airport, transporting Prince William, Duke of Cambridge, and Catherine, Duchess of Cambridge, July 2011

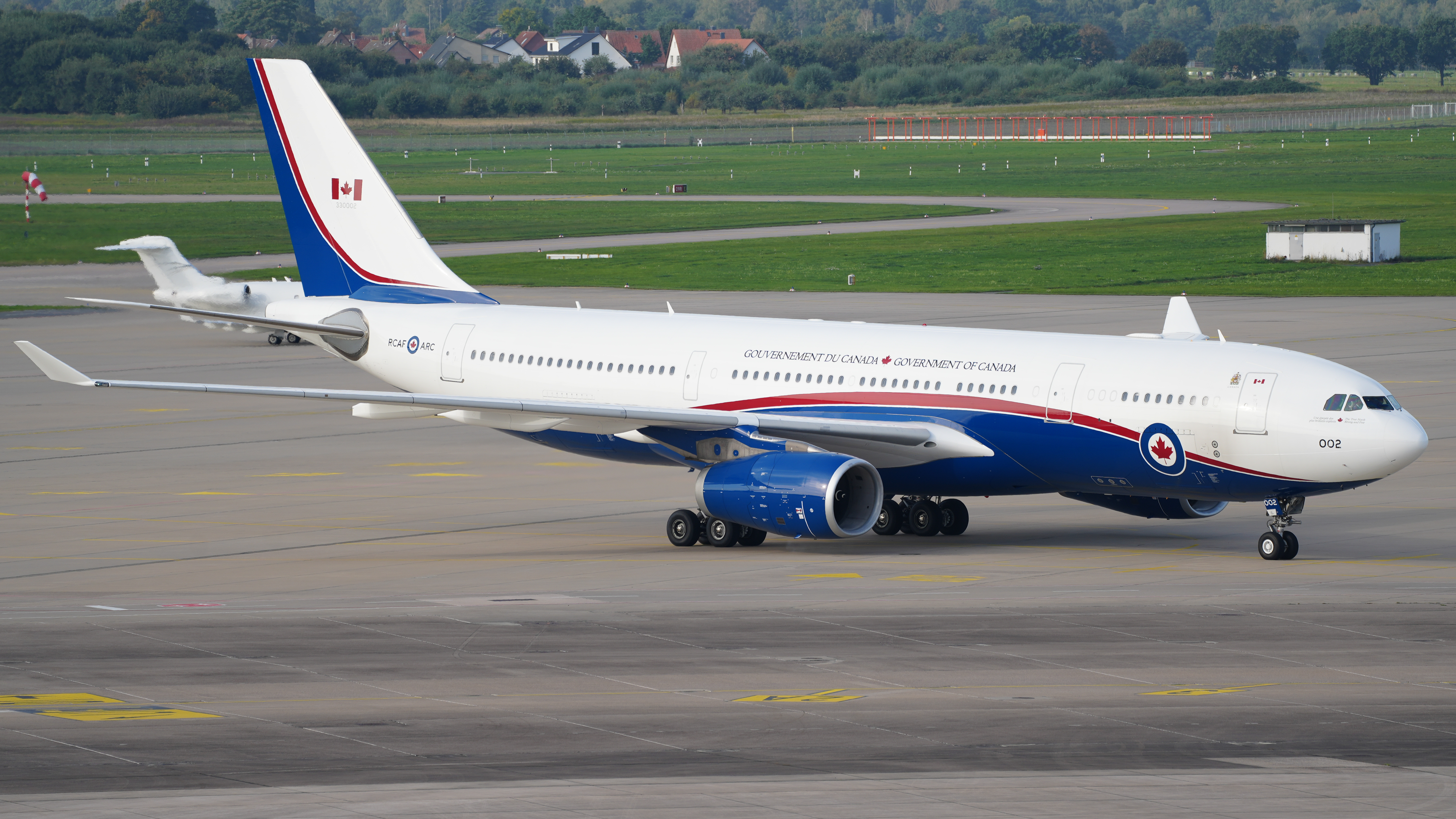
CC-330 Husky VIP and strategic transport aircraft

All dedicated VIP transport aircraft in the Canadian Forces are operated by 437 Transport Squadron and 412 Transport Squadron. Attendants on flights operated by these squadrons are select volunteers from various branches of the Canadian Forces and serve in their posting for two or three years; they must undergo an intensive training period and additional security background checks prior to VIP transport duty.

437 Transport Squadron, based at CFB Trenton, operates five Airbus A310-300s, all designated as CC-150 Polaris; four are configured as normal airliners with cargo transport and aerial refuelling capability, while one, No. 001, is operated in a VIP configuration. This latter aircraft, known officially as Can Force One, has a galley, spartan bedroom (wall panels added to provide privacy with small bed and sofa), sitting room, office space, and a shower approximately the size of a small phone booth. The executive suite includes a satellite telephone, two computer work stations, and a small refrigerator and, at the rear portion of the aircraft, is a normal passenger cabin, used to carry regular military passengers, members of the VIP party, or reporters. The squadron's information officer stated of the interior in 1997: "It's no more luxurious than a good motor home." The aircraft is referred to as the Royal Flight when carrying the King or another member of the royal family. When taxiing, the personal flag of the most senior royal on board is flown from the port-side cockpit window.

412 Transport Squadron, based at Macdonald–Cartier International Airport (formerly CFB Ottawa, and previously at CFB Uplands), is the only RCAF unit dedicated exclusively to executive transport and as of 2010 operated Canada's four CC-144-designated Bombardier Challenger 604 and Bombardier Challenger 650 business jets in a VIP configuration.

In November 2023, Prime Minister Justin Trudeau took his first flight aboard a refurbished Airbus A330-200 purchased from Kuwait Airways. The new aircraft, known as Airbus 02, replaced the previous Airbus A310-300 known as Airbus 01. The RCAF's designation for the new fleet of nine Airbus A330-200 aircraft that will replace the aging CC-150 Polaris is Airbus CC-330 Husky.

== See also ==
- Royal and viceroyal transport in Canada
- Air transports of heads of state and government
- The Canadian Crown and the Canadian Forces
- Royal tours of Canada
- Royal Australian Air Force VIP aircraft
- Air transport of the Royal Family and government of the United Kingdom
