= 437 Transport Squadron =

- Active: 1944–1946; 1961–present
- Country: Canada
- Branch: (Canada) Royal Canadian Air Force
- Role: Transport & aerial refueling
- Part of: 8 Wing Trenton
- Home station: CFB Trenton
- Nickname: Husky
- Mottos: Omnia passim ("Anything Anywhere")
- Battle honours: France and Germany 1944–1945; Arnhem; Rhine Libya

Insignia
- Squadron Badge: Argent a husky's head affronté erased proper

Aircraft flown
- Transport: Douglas Dakota; CC-106 Yukon; Boeing CC-137; Airbus CC-150 Polaris; Airbus CC-330 Husky

437 Transport Squadron is a unit of the Canadian Armed Forces under the Royal Canadian Air Force, based at CFB Trenton in Ontario. The unit operates the CC-150 Polaris, the CC-330 Husky, and is responsible for long range military and VIP transportation (including for the Royal Family visiting Canada).

== History ==
437 Squadron was formed at RAF Blakehill Farm in Wiltshire, England in September 1944 as a unit of the Royal Canadian Air Force, and provided general transport until it was disbanded in June 1946. During this time the squadron flew Douglas Dakota (Mk.III and IV) aircraft. The Squadron saw active duty in glider towing and airdrops in the Battle of Arnhem (Operation Market Garden) and in the Crossing of the Rhine (Operation Varsity). Details, including a list of wartime personnel, can be found with this reference

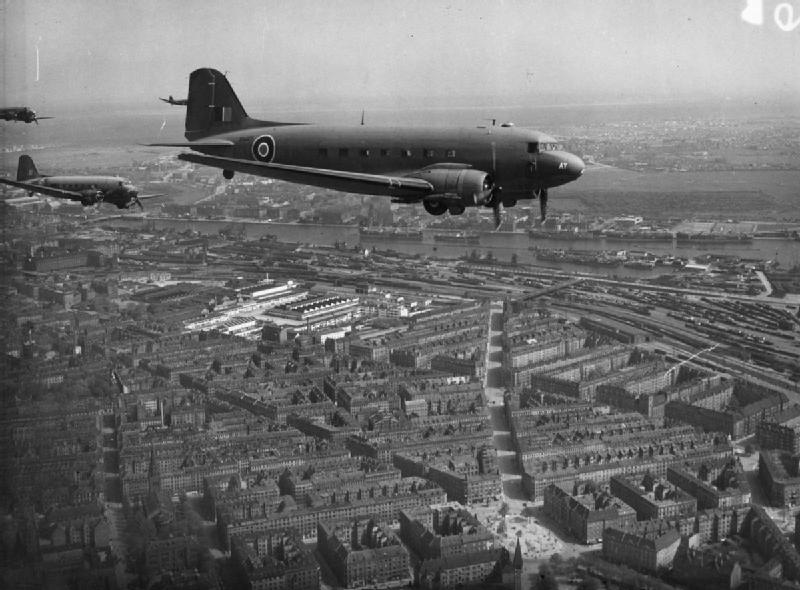
A Dakota Douglas of No. 437 Squadron over Copenhagen, in Denmark

The squadron was reformed at CFB Trenton in 1961 and equipped with CC-106 Yukon. It was re-equipped with the Boeing CC-137 (Boeing 707) in 1970. While operating the Husky it provided Air to Air Refueling in addition to transport services. Two aircraft out of the fleet of five were modified to serve as refueling tankers in mid 1972 to meet a requirement to support the CF-5 tactical fighter.

At the end of the useful life of the B707 in 1997, 437 Squadron was equipped with Airbus A-310 aircraft which are in use still to this day in both the VIP transport and air-to-air refuelling roles. In 2022, the government of Canada announced its plans to replace the CC-150 with the Airbus CC-330 Husky, an RCAF version of the Airbus A330 MRTT, for strategic transport and air refuelling roles. In 2023, the order was increased to nine CC-330’s with the first being delivered and configured to use as the primary VIP Transport aircraft of the 427 squadron, when transporting the Prime Minister of Canada, the Governor General of Canada, and the Monarchy of Canada.

== Operations ==
437 Transport Squadron frequently supports government dignitaries while on official visits, including the Prime Minister of Canada and Charles III, King of Canada during Royal tours of Canada. In June and July 2011 the squadron provided transportation for the Duke and Duchess of Cambridge as they toured Canada and the United States.

The squadron currently operates the CC-150 Polaris, a modified version of the Airbus A310, along with the newly acquired CC-330 Husky, which is a modified Airbus A330 MRTT. Three CC-150’s, and one CC-330 are configured for personnel and material transport, while the rest are configured into the aerial refueling role.

Two CC-150 air-to-air refueling tankers were deployed to support Operation MOBILE during the 2011 military intervention in Libya. Canadian CF-188 fighter jets that enforce the no-fly zone over Libya under Operation Odyssey Dawn and Operation Unified Protector were refueled by 437 Sqn.
