= Qantas Defence Services =

Qantas Defence Services is a defence service company that was formerly a wholly owned subsidiary of Qantas. In August 2013, QDS was sold to Northrop Grumman for A$80 million.

The subsidiary had been providing maintenance for Lockheed C-130 Hercules aircraft, as well as work on the Royal Australian Air Force (RAAF) Airbus A330 Multi Role Tanker Transports and also maintained both Prime Ministerial Boeing Business Jets.

Qantas is providing increasing support for the RAAF:

- Partnered with Airbus for the supply of Airbus A330 Multi Role Tanker Transport to replace the RAAF's Boeing 707s in the aerial refueling and strategic transport roles
- Lease to RAAF of 2 Boeing Business Jets, including maintenance
- Support of RAAF Boeing Wedgetail aircraft
- Repair, Overhaul and Engineering Support of the T-56 Turboprop Engine (powering the RAAF Fleet of C-130H and P-3C Aircraft)
- Repair and Overhaul of the Rolls-Royce Turbomeca Adour Mk 871-05 Turbofan Engine (powering the RAAF Fleet of BAE Hawks)
- Deeper Level maintenance support of the RAAF's fleet of C-130 Hercules transport aircraft
- Maintenance and Engineering support of the RAAF's fleet of P&W R2000-7M2 engines installed on Caribou transport aircraft.
