= Airbus CC-330 Husky =

Canadian military transport aircraft

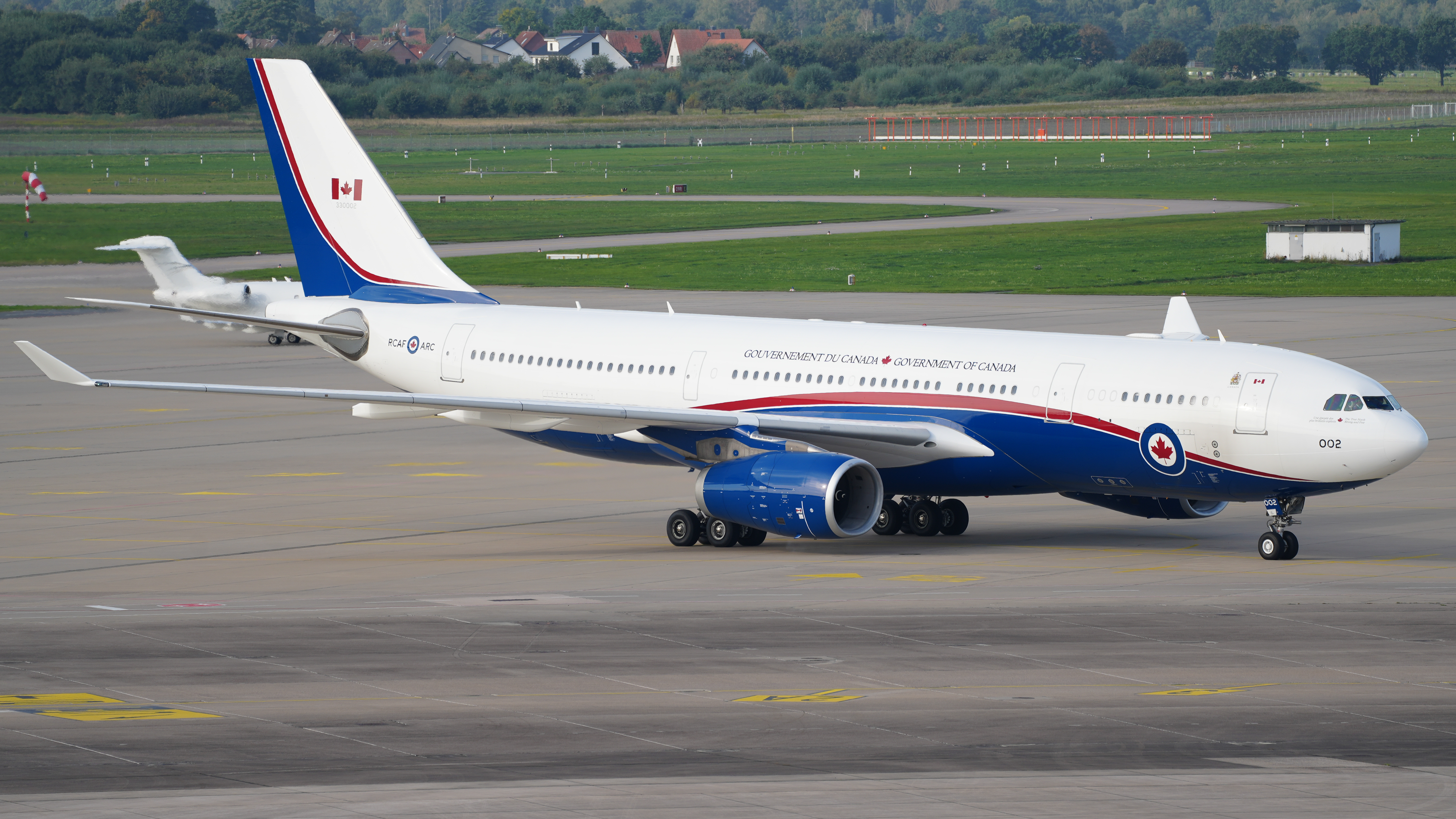
- CC-330 Husky 330002 at Hannover Airport, Oct 2023

General information
- Type: Strategic transport/VIP transport/tanker
- Manufacturer: Airbus
- Status: In service
- Primary user: Royal Canadian Air Force

History
- Introduction date: 2023
- Developed from: Airbus A330 MRTT
- Predecessors: CC-150 Polaris

The Airbus CC-330 Husky is a Royal Canadian Air Force version of the Airbus A330 MRTT based on the civilian Airbus A330. Nine aircraft will replace the existing Airbus CC-150 Polaris fleet of five aircraft in the strategic transport and air refuelling roles.

== Development ==
In June 2017, the Canadian Armed Forces and Government of Canada announced their plan to procure a CC-150 Polaris replacement.

In July 2022, the Government of Canada announced a deal to acquire two used Airbus A330-200s which would be modified to A330 MRTT configuration, with four more to be acquired later, for a total of six aircraft.

In July 2023, the order was increased to nine aircraft, eight of which will be MRTT and one for VIP transportation. Four aircraft will be purchased new from Airbus, with five aircraft purchased used from the commercial market. Three additional A330-200s were purchased in July 2023 for C$203 million ($150 million). Training for the crew began in January 2023, which took three months on average for a Polaris pilot. The aircraft will be located at two main operating bases, one in eastern Canada and one in western Canada, and at least one NORAD forward operating location. Ottawa International Airport has been selected as the interim operating base for the first two aircraft.

The first of two, ex-Kuwait Airways aircraft, designated 330002 entered service in November 2023 as a VIP and strategic transport aircraft. The second, designated 330003, entered service in February 2024. The tankers will be equipped with both probe and drogue and flying boom refuelling equipment, permitting them to refuel any NATO or allied aircraft, which will also improve NORAD support.

The first new-built multi-role tanker and transport aircraft completed its first flight on July 1, 2026. The aircraft, designated Husky 006, will have to undergo further conversion before delivery to Canada in 2027. The Husky is expected to reach initial operational capability by 2029, and full operational capability in 2032-33.

== Operational history ==
King Charles III arrived at and departed from Ottawa, Canada on aircraft 330002 during his May 26 and 27, 2025 visit to attend the State Opening of the Parliament of Canada.

== See also ==
Related development

- Airbus A330
- Airbus A330 MRTT
- EADS/Northrop Grumman KC-45

Aircraft of comparable role, configuration, and era

- Boeing KC-46 Pegasus
- Boeing KC-135 Stratotanker
- Ilyushin Il-96-400TZ
- McDonnell Douglas KC-10 Extender
