= Scottish Digital Network =

The Scottish Digital Network (SDN) is a planned new public service broadcaster and online services provider in Scotland. It was the principal proposal of the Scottish Broadcasting Commission. The Scottish Broadcasting Commission published its final report in September 2008, with this as its primary recommendation. On 13 September 2010 the Minister for Culture and External Affairs, Fiona Hyslop, requested Blair Jenkins, who had been the chair of the Scottish Broadcasting Commission to actively explore proposed options and business models for the establishment of a Scottish digital network to compete in public service broadcasting with the BBC Network in Scotland. On 21 March 2013, three bidders were announced as the finalists for the Scottish Wide Area Network (SWAN). They were British Telecom, a partnership of Cable & Wireless Worldwide with Virgin Media Business and Capita with Updata Infrastructure.

It appears that no significant progress was made at the time; a 2016 article by Philip Schlesinger, Professor in Cultural Policy at the University of Glasgow and visiting professor in the Department of Media and Communication at the LSE commented that "The Scottish Digital Network originally proposed by the Scottish Broadcasting Commission has reappeared in the form of a proposed second channel, although its precise form is unclear".

== Scottish Digital Network Panel ==
The members of the Scottish Digital Network Panel consist of:

- Blair Jenkins (convener); former convener of the Scottish Broadcasting Commission
- Professor Neil Blain, Head of Film, Media and Journalism at Stirling University
- Judith Mackenzie, investment director at Downing Corporate Finance
- Charles McGhee, media consultant and former editor of The Herald
- David Wightman, former member of the Scottish Broadcasting Commission and founder and former CEO of Creative Edge Software
