= Signet =

Signet may refer to:

- Signet (Kenya), A subsidiary of the Kenyan Broadcasting Corporation (KBC), specifically set up to broadcast and distribute the DTT signals
- Signet ring, a ring with a seal set into it, typically by leaving an impression in sealing wax
- Signet ring cell, a malignant cell type associated with cancers
- Signet Books, a book-publishing imprint of the New American Library
- Signet Press, a publisher in India.
- SigneT, a class of racing dinghy, designed in 1961 by Ian Proctor
- Signet (Phi Sigma Kappa), a publication produced by the fraternity Phi Sigma Kappa published four times a year
- Signet Jewelers, the world's largest specialty retail jeweller
- USS Signet (AM-302), a minesweeper
- Kodak Signet, Kodak 1950s 35mm still camera line
- Signet (automobile)
- Signature Bank's proprietary payment network

== Places ==
- Signet, Ontario, a community in Canada
- Signet, Oxfordshire, a hamlet in England

== See also ==
- Society of Writers to Her Majesty's Signet, a legal society of solicitors in Scotland
- Cygnet (disambiguation)
