= Swan (disambiguation) =

A swan is a bird of the genus Cygnus (true swans) or Coscoroba (coscoroba swans).

Swan, swans, or The Swan may also refer to:

== Arts, entertainment, and media ==
=== Film and television ===
- The Swan (1925 film), a 1925 silent film
- The Swan (1956 film), a 1956 remake of a 1925 film of the same title
- Swan (1976 film), a Bulgarian drama film
- Swan, a television ident for BBC Two first aired in early 1998; see BBC Two '1991–2001' idents
- The Swan (TV series), a U.S. reality TV series from 2004
- Swan (2011 film), a Portuguese film directed by Teresa Villaverde

=== Literature ===
- Swan (manga), a shōjo manga by Ariyoshi Kyoko
- "The Swan" (Baudelaire), a poem by Baudelaire
- The Swan (newspaper), a student newspaper of St. Hugh's College, Oxford
- The Swan (novel), an English translation edition of 1991 novel by Guðbergur Bergsson
- "The Swan" (short story), a 1977 story by Roald Dahl
- The Swan, a 1920 play by Ferenc Molnár

=== Music and dance ===
- Swans (band), an experimental rock group
  - Swans (EP), a 1982 EP by Swans
- Swan (album), a 2011 album by Unwritten Law
- "The Swan", a song by Jay Chou from the 2007 album Secret
- The Swan (ballet), better known as The Dying Swan
- Le Cygne (Saint-Saëns), a movement of the musical suite The Carnival of the Animals

== Organisations ==
- Swan (rolling papers), a subsidiary of Swedish Match
- Swans (eyewear), a Japanese eyewear brand
- Swan Electronics, a radio gear manufacturer
- Swan Records (jazz label)
- Swan Records, a pop record label

== People ==
- Howard E. Johnson (musician) (1908–1991), American swing alto saxophonist, nicknamed Swan
- Joseph Swan (1828—1914), English physicist, chemist, and inventor (most notably of the filament lightbulb)
- Howard Swan (1906–1995), American choral conductor and music educator
- Swan (surname), a list of people with the name
- Swan Hennessy (1866–1929), Irish-American composer based in Paris
- Swan King (1845–1886), nickname for Ludwig II of Bavaria
- Swan of Stowe, nickname for the Catholic saint Hugh of Lincoln
- Bunny Swan, Chinese character on Madtv played by Alex Borstein

== Places ==
- Swan River (disambiguation)
- Swan Township (disambiguation)
- Swan Valley (disambiguation)

=== Australia ===
- City of Swan, Perth
  - Division of Swan, an electoral district based on the surrounding area
- Swan Bay, Port Phillip, Victoria
- Swan Hill, Victoria

=== United States ===
- Swan, Indiana
- Swan, Iowa
- Swan, Missouri
- Swan Range, a mountain range in Montana
- Swan, Texas
- Swan, Wisconsin
- Swan Township, Holt County, Nebraska
- Swan's Island, Maine

=== In space ===
- Comet SWAN (disambiguation), the name of several comets
- Cygnus (constellation), a constellation also known as the Swan

=== Elsewhere ===
- The Swan, County Laois, Ireland
- Erasmusbrug, a bridge nicknamed "The Swan" in Rotterdam, Netherlands
- Swans, Punjab, Pakistan
- The Swan, County Laois, Ireland

== Science and technology ==
=== Computing ===
- Scottish Wide Area Network (SWAN), the secure network for Scotland’s public services
- State Wide Area Network, in the National e-Governance Plan of India

=== Other uses in science and technology ===
- Swan's theorem, a concept in mathematics
- Solar Wind Anisotropies, an instrument of the Solar and Heliospheric Observatory spacecraft
- Syndrome without a name, a term indicating an unknown idiopathic disease
- Swan (nuclear primary), a prototype thermonuclear primary

== Ships and boats ==
- HMAS Swan, several Royal Australian Navy ships
- HMS Swan, several British Royal Navy ships
- Nautor's Swan, a line of Finnish luxury sailing yachts
- Swan boat (racing), a long and narrow human-powered boat
- Swan Boats (Boston, Massachusetts), a fleet of pleasure boats
- Swan Boats (Magic Kingdom), a ride at the Magic Kingdom, Walt Disney World, (1973–1983)
- Swan Hellenic, a cruise line
- Swan (sternwheeler), a stern-wheel steamboat
- USS Swan, several US Navy ships

== Sports ==
- Swan Districts Football Club, an Australian rules football club based in Bassendean, Australia
- Swan Racing, a NASCAR racing team
- Swan United FC, a football club based in Swan Valley, Australia
- Sydney Swans, an Australian rules football club

== Venues ==
=== England ===
- Old Swan Hotel, a listed hotel in Harrogate, North Yorkshire
- Swan Hotel, Bedford, a pub in Bedfordshire
- Swan Hotel, Bolton, a listed pub in Greater Manchester
- Swan Hotel, Bradford-on-Avon, a listed hotel in Wiltshire
- Swan Hotel, a hotel in Wells, Somerset
- Swan Inn, Dobcross, a pub in Saddleworth, Greater Manchester
- Swan Inn, Westminster, a pub in London
- Swan Theatre, Stratford-upon-Avon, a theatre belonging to the Royal Shakespeare Company
- The Swan (theatre), in London
- The Swan, Hammersmith, a pub in London
- The Swan, Little Totham, a pub in Essex
- The Swan, Tetsworth, a former inn in Oxfordshire
- The Swan, West Wycombe, a pub in Buckinghamshire
- The Swan, York, a pub in North Yorkshire
- The Swan Inn, Ruislip, former pub in the London Borough of Hillingdon
- The Swan Inn, Worlingworth, a pub in Suffolk
- Wycombe Swan, a theatre in High Wycombe, Buckinghamshire

=== Other venues ===
- Walt Disney World Swan, a US resort hotel

== Other uses ==
- Swan (beer), a beer label, Western Australia
- Swan (chair), designed in 1958 by Arne jacobsen
- Swan (Dungeons & Dragons)
- Swan (Exalted), a role-playing game published by White Wolf Publishing
- Swan (Fabergé egg), commissioned in 1906 by Tsar Nicholas II
- Swan Bells, a set of bells in Perth, Australia
- Swan diagram, an economics model
- Swan Soap, a brand of soap introduced by the Lever Brothers Company
- SwanCon, a science fiction convention

== See also ==
- Coscoroba swan, a relative of true swans
- Swan goose, a type of goose
- Swan mussel, a type of mollusk
- The Swans (disambiguation)
- Swann (disambiguation)
- Wild Swans (disambiguation)
- Cygnus (disambiguation)
