= Comet SWAN =

Comet SWAN refers to comets discovered and named after the SWAN instrument on board the Solar and Heliospheric Observatory (SOHO) spacecraft:

- C/1997 K2 (SWAN)
- C/2002 O6 (SWAN)
- C/2004 H6 (SWAN)
- C/2004 V13 (SWAN)
- C/2005 P3 (SWAN)
- P/2005 T4 (SWAN)
- C/2006 M4 (SWAN)
- C/2011 Q4 (SWAN)
- C/2012 E2 (SWAN), a Kreutz sungrazer comet
- C/2015 C2 (SWAN)
- C/2015 F3 (SWAN)
- C/2015 P3 (SWAN)
- C/2020 F8 (SWAN)
- C/2021 D1 (SWAN)
- C/2023 A2 (SWAN)
- C/2025 F2 (SWAN), formerly known as SWAN25F
- C/2025 R2 (SWAN), formerly known as SWAN25B
- C/2026 B4 (SWAN), formerly known as SWAN26B
- C/2026 P3 (SWAN), formerly known as SWAN26Q

Other comets discovered by SWAN include:

- C/2009 F6 (Yi–SWAN)
- C/2015 F5 (SWAN-XingMing)
- 273P/Pons–Gambart, recovered in SWAN data in November 2012 and temporarily thought to be a new discovery until orbital calculations revealed it to be a comet last seen in 1827
