= Yara Zgheib =

Writer

Yara Zgheib is a Lebanese-born writer living in Paris, France. She is the author of No Land to Light On (2022), which was longlisted for the Dylan Thomas Prize and chosen as an Indie Next Pick, and The Girls at 17 Swann Street (2019), which was also an Indie Next Pick, a Booklist and Women's National Book Association Favourite, and a People pick for best books of 2019. Her poetry has received various awards, been adapted into musical albums, and performed in concert.

== Life and Education ==
Zgheib was born in Beirut at the end of the Lebanese civil war and grew up between Lebanon, Europe, and the United States, where she received a Fulbright scholarship to complete her master's degree in Security Studies at Georgetown University in Washington, D.C. She subsequently relocated to Paris, where she completed a PhD in International Affairs and Diplomacy at the Centre d'Études Diplomatiques et Stratégiques.

== Career ==
=== Novels ===
==== The Girls at 17 Swann Street (2019) ====
Zgheib's first novel, The Girls at 17 Swann Street, was hailed as a "powerful" and "impressive, deeply moving debut" by Publishers Weekly, and "a singular celebration of the lifesaving power of community and small gestures" by The New York Times. It was selected as an Indie Next Pick by independent booksellers across the United States, a BookMovement Group Read, a Women's National Book Association and Booklist Favourite, and a People's pick for best books of 2019. Described as "a haunting portrait of a young woman's struggle with anorexia on an intimate journey to reclaim her life," the novel sheds light on the realities and life-threatening consequences of eating disorders. It was first published by St. Martin's Press at MacMillan Publishers and has since been translated into four languages.

==== No Land to Light On (2022) ====
Zgheib's second novel, No Land to Light On, was longlisted for the Dylan Thomas Prize and selected as an Indie Next Pick. It received critical acclaim as "a masterful story of tragedy and redemption" written in "soul-searing prose," and was chosen by The Washington Post, The L.A. Times, and others as one of the top ten most important books of 2022. Set against the backdrop of the 2017 U.S. Executive Order and travel ban that affected over 60,000 visa-holders living in the United States, the story follows a young immigrant couple torn apart overnight and stranded between homelands.The Washington Post praised the novel as a work that goes beyond protest fiction, tracing the lives of people caught between a nation's promise of "freedom and hope" and the blunt machinery of its policies. The L.A. Times noted Zgheib's use of color and sensory detail to convey the emotional texture of displacement, and described her as a writer who, "with glittering language [...] brings emotional resonance to the effects of monstrous policies." According to Kirkus, "Zgheib has created a tense, moving novel about the meaning of home, the risks of exile, the power of nations, and the power of love."

No Land to Light On was first published by Atria Books (Simon & Schuster).

=== Poetry ===
==== City Rhapsodies (2022) ====
An album of music and poetry co-written and performed with composer and conductor Alex Wakim.

==== Dust and Ions (2025) ====
Co-authored with composer and conductor Alex Wakim, Dust and Ions is a work of poetry and orchestra composed in response to the Beirut port explosion on August 4, 2020, the largest non-nuclear blast in history, which killed hundreds, injured thousands, and destroyed more half the city in an instant. The story juxtaposes the devastation of the event with the simultaneous appearance, that same evening, of Comet NEOWISE (C/2020 F3), one of the brightest to streak the sky over Earth in decades. Dust and Ions was performed in concert across the U.S. to raise funds for the relief effort in Beirut, and as a book, won the Rose Metal Award in 2023. It will be published by Rose Metal Press in 2027.

== Awards and recognition ==
- 2019: Indie Next Pick for The Girls at 17 Swann Street
- 2019: People Magazine Pick for The Girls at 17 Swann Street
- 2022: Indie Next Pick for No Land to Light On
- 2023: Dylan Thomas Prize Longlist for No Land to Light On
- 2023: Rose Metal Press Award for Dust and Ions

== Publications ==
- The Girls at 17 Swann Street. New York: St. Martin's Press, MacMillan. (2019) ISBN 978-1-250-20244-4
- No Land to Light On. New York: Atria, Simon and Schuster. (2022) ISBN 978-1-9821-8742-2
- Dust and Ions. Rose Metal Press. (forthcoming 2027)
- Florilegium. Akoya Publishing. (forthcoming 2028)
