= Cygnus =

Cygnus is the Latin word for swan and may refer to:

== Astronomy ==
- Cygnus (constellation), a northern constellation
  - Cygnus A, a radio galaxy within the constellation
  - Cygnus X (star complex), a star complex within the constellation
  - Cygnus X-1, a binary system within the constellation
  - Cygnus X-3, a binary system within the constellation

== Business & industry ==
- Cygnus 20, a Canadian sailboat design
- Cygnus (spacecraft), a space vehicle developed by Orbital Sciences Corporation and Thales Alenia Space
- Cygnus Air or Gestair Cargo, a Spanish cargo airline
- Cygnus Business Media, a U.S.-based business-to-business publishing company
- Cygnus Solutions, a company that provided commercial support for free software and the original developer of Cygwin

== Other uses ==
- Cygnus (genus), the genus of most swans
- Cygnus (mythology) or Cycnus, a number of characters in Greek mythology
- Cygnus X-1 (song series), a 1977–1978 two-part song series by Rush
- Cygnus X (music group), a trance music project
- Cygnus (spacecraft), an expendable cargo spacecraft
- Airbus A330 MRTT KC-330 Cygnus, South Korean aerial refuelling and military transport aircraft for the Republic of Korea Air Force (ROKAF) by Airbus
- USS Cygnus, a fictional starship in The Black Hole
- Empress Cygnus, a non-player character in the game MapleStory
- Exercise Cygnus, a three-day influenza simulation exercise carried out by the UK Government in October 2016
- Cygnus gas field, a UK North Sea gas field
- Cygnus, Colombian Folk Rock/Metal Band

== See also ==
- Cyclone Global Navigation Satellite System (CYGNSS), a hurricane study satellite constellation in development by NASA
- Cygnet (disambiguation)
- Cygwin
- Swan (disambiguation)
