= Comet NEOWISE =

Great Comet of 2020

C/2020 F3 (NEOWISE) (Great Comet of 2020)
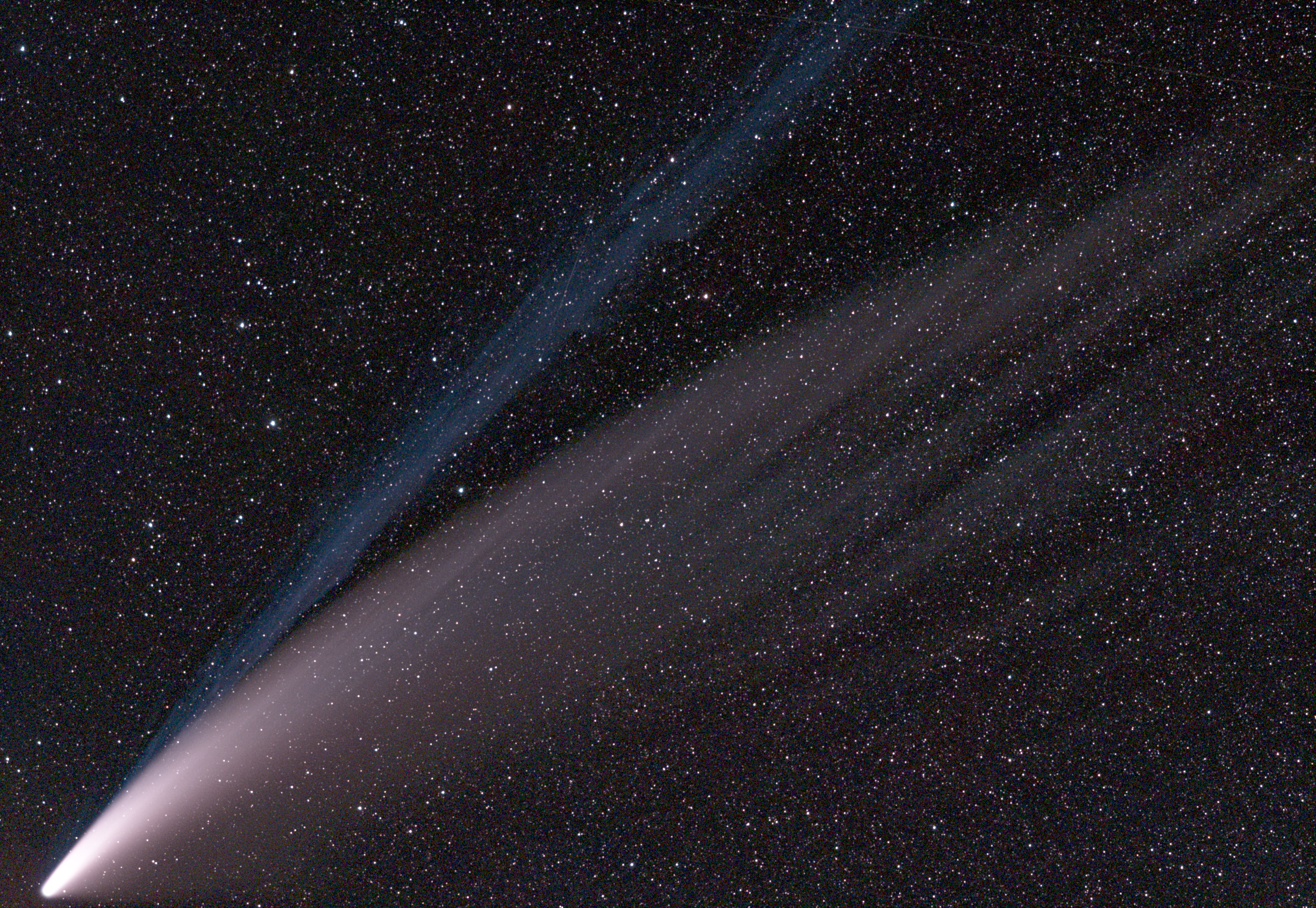
- Comet NEOWISE photographed from Germany on July 14, 2020

Discovery
- Discovered by: NEOWISE
- Discovery date: March 27, 2020

Designations
- Alternative designations: CK20F030

Orbital characteristics
- Epoch: July 6, 2020 (JD 2459036.5)
- Observation arc: 1.2 years (438 days)
- Number of observations: 1,315
- Aphelion: 538 AU (inbound); 710 AU (outbound)
- Perihelion: 0.295 AU
- Semi-major axis: 270 AU (inbound); 355 AU (outbound)
- Eccentricity: 0.99921
- Orbital period: ~4,500 yrs (inbound); ~6,800 yrs (outbound)
- Inclination: 128.94°
- Longitude of ascending node: 61.010°
- Argument of periapsis: 37.279°
- Mean anomaly: 0.0003°
- Last perihelion: 3 July 2020
- T_{Jupiter}: −0.408
- Earth MOID: 0.362 AU
- Jupiter MOID: 0.813 AU

Physical characteristics
- Dimensions: ~5.0 km (3.1 mi)
- Synodic rotation period: 7.58±0.03 hours
- Comet total magnitude (M1): 7.5–12.1
- Apparent magnitude: 0.5–1.0 (2020 apparition)

C/2020 F3 (NEOWISE) or Comet NEOWISE is a long period comet with a near-parabolic orbit discovered on March 27, 2020, by astronomers during the NEOWISE mission of the Wide-field Infrared Survey Explorer (WISE) space telescope. At that time, it was an 18th-magnitude object, located 2.0 AU (300 million km; 190 million mi) away from the Sun and 1.7 AU (250 million km; 160 million mi) away from Earth.

NEOWISE is known for being the brightest comet in the northern hemisphere since Comet Hale–Bopp in 1997. It was widely photographed by professional and amateur observers and was even spotted by people living near city centers and areas with light pollution. While it was too close to the Sun to be observed at perihelion, it emerged from perihelion around magnitude 0.5 to 1, making it bright enough to be visible to the naked eye. Under dark skies, it could be seen with the naked eye and remained visible to the naked eye throughout July 2020. By July 30, the comet was about magnitude 5, when binoculars were required near urban areas to locate the comet.

For observers in the Northern Hemisphere, the comet could be seen on the northwestern horizon, below the Big Dipper. North of 45 degrees north, the comet was visible all night in mid-July 2020. On July 30, Comet NEOWISE entered the constellation of Coma Berenices, below the bright star Arcturus.

NEOWISE was retroactively dubbed the Great Comet of 2020.

== History and observations ==
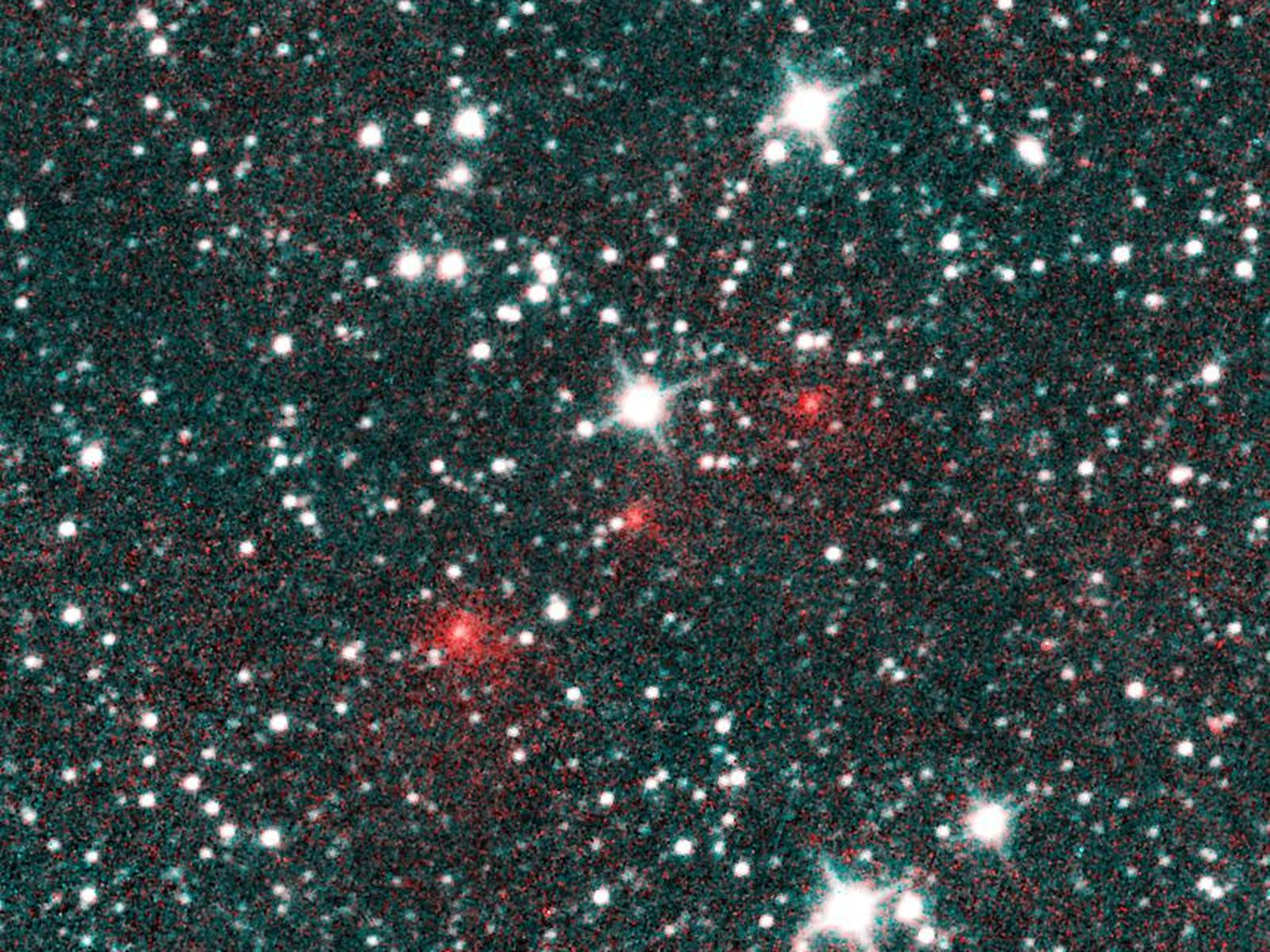
Discovery image – the comet appears as three fuzzy red dots in this composite of three infrared images taken by NEOWISE on March 27, 2020

The object was discovered by a team using the WISE space telescope under the NEOWISE program on March 27, 2020. It was classified as a comet on March 31 and named after NEOWISE on April 1. It has the systematic designation C/2020 F3, indicating a non-periodic comet which was the third discovered in the second half of March 2020.

Comet NEOWISE made its closest approach to the Sun (perihelion) on July 3, 2020, at a distance of 0.29 AU (43 million km; 27 million mi). This passage through the planetary region increases the comet's orbital period from about 4500 years to about 6800 years. Its closest approach to Earth occurred on July 23, 2020, 01:09 UTC, at a distance of 0.69 AU (103 million km; 64 million mi) while located in the constellation of Ursa Major.

In early July, the comet could be seen in the morning sky just above the north-eastern horizon and below Capella. Seen from Earth, the comet was less than 20 degrees from the Sun between June 11–July 9, 2020. By June 10, 2020 as the comet was being lost to the glare of the Sun, it was apparent magnitude 7.0, when it was 0.7 AU (100 million km; 65 million mi) away from Sun and 1.6 AU (240 million km; 150 million mi) away from Earth. When the comet entered the field of view of the SOHO spacecraft's LASCO C3 instrument on June 22, 2020, the comet had brightened to about magnitude 3.0, when it was 0.4 AU (60 million km; 37 million mi) away from the Sun and 1.4 AU (210 million km; 130 million mi) away from Earth.

By early July, Comet NEOWISE had brightened to magnitude 1.0, far exceeding the brightness attained by previous comets that year, C/2020 F8 (SWAN), and C/2019 Y4 (ATLAS). By July, it also had developed a second tail. The first tail was blue and made of gas and ions. There was also a red separation in the tail caused by high amounts of sodium. The second twin tail was a golden color and was made of dust, like the tail of Comet Hale–Bopp. The comet was brighter than C/2011 L4 (PanSTARRS), but not as bright as Hale–Bopp was in 1997. After perihelion, the comet began to fade, dropping to magnitude 2.0 in mid-July. Its nucleus activity subdued after mid-July, and its green coma was clearly visible after that.

On July 13, 2020, a sodium tail was confirmed by the Planetary Science Institute's Input/Output facility. Sodium tails have only been observed in very bright comets such as Hale–Bopp and C/2012 S1 (ISON).

From the infrared signature, the diameter of the comet nucleus is estimated to be approximately 5 km (3.1 mi). The nucleus is similar in size to Comet Hyakutake and many short-period comets such as 2P/Encke, 7P/Pons–Winnecke, 8P/Tuttle, 14P/Wolf, and 19P/Borrelly. By July 5, NASA's Parker Solar Probe had captured an image of the comet, from which astronomers also estimated the diameter of the comet nucleus at approximately 5 km (3.1 mi) as well. Later in July 2020, other observations were also reported, including those related to coma morphology, and spectrographic emissions. On 31 July 2020, strong detection of OH 18-cm emission was observed in radio spectroscopic studies at the Arecibo Observatory, in Puerto Rico. On August 14, 2020, the rotation period of the comet was reported to be "7.58±0.03 hr".

After its perihelion and closest approach to Earth, a number of authors have suggested considering NEOWISE as a great comet. Others have argued that it lacked the brightness and visible tail to qualify. Retroactively, in the years that followed, NEOWISE is commonly remembered as a great comet.

== Trajectory ==
Comet NEOWISE's retrograde orbit crossed to the north of the plane of the ecliptic, to which it is inclined at approximately 129 degrees, on June 29, 2020, 01:47 UTC. It made its closest approach to the Sun (perihelion) on July 3, 2020, at a distance of 0.29 AU (43 million km; 27 million mi). This passage increases the comet's orbital period from about 4400 years to about 6700 years. On July 18, the comet peaked at a northern declination of +48 and was circumpolar down to latitude 42N. Its closest approach to Earth occurred on July 23, 2020, 01:09 UTC, at a distance of 0.69 AU (103 million km; 64 million mi) while located in the constellation of Ursa Major.

The comet's orbital characteristics suggest it originated from the Oort cloud. Its high orbital eccentricity of 0.99921 confirms its path is a nearly parabolic trajectory, typical of long-period comets making one of their first passages into the inner Solar System. The orbital inclination of 129 degrees classifies it as a retrograde comet, meaning it orbits the Sun in the opposite direction to Earth and the other planets. This path is what allowed it to approach the Sun from the south of the ecliptic plane before crossing northwards just before its perihelion. The difference between the inbound orbital period of about 4,400 years and the outbound period of about 6,700 years is a result of gravitational perturbations from the planets. As the comet passed through the planetary region, the slight gravitational pull from the planets transferred energy to it, accelerating it and placing it on a higher-energy, longer-period outbound orbit. This also increased its aphelion, the farthest point in its orbit from the Sun.

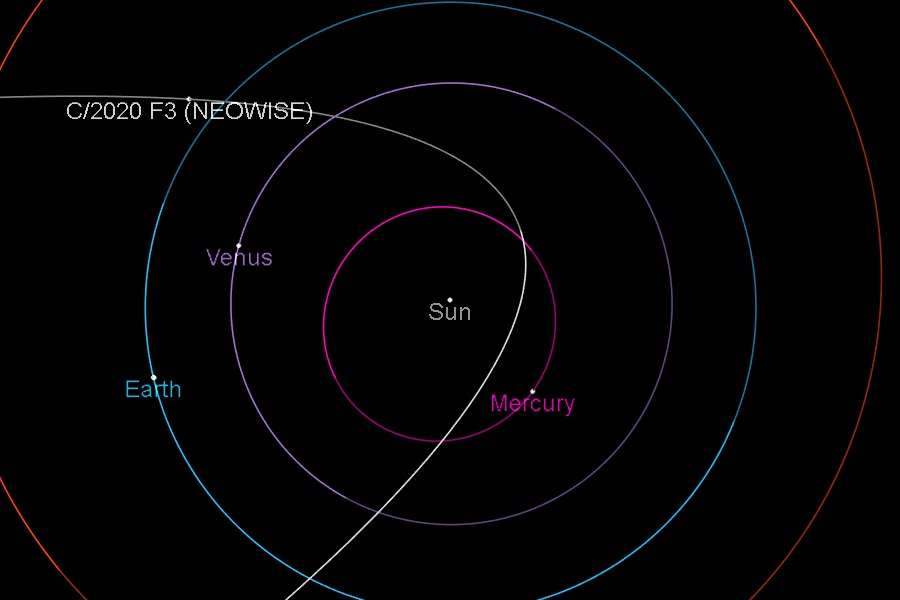
Diagram of the comet's nearly parabolic orbit

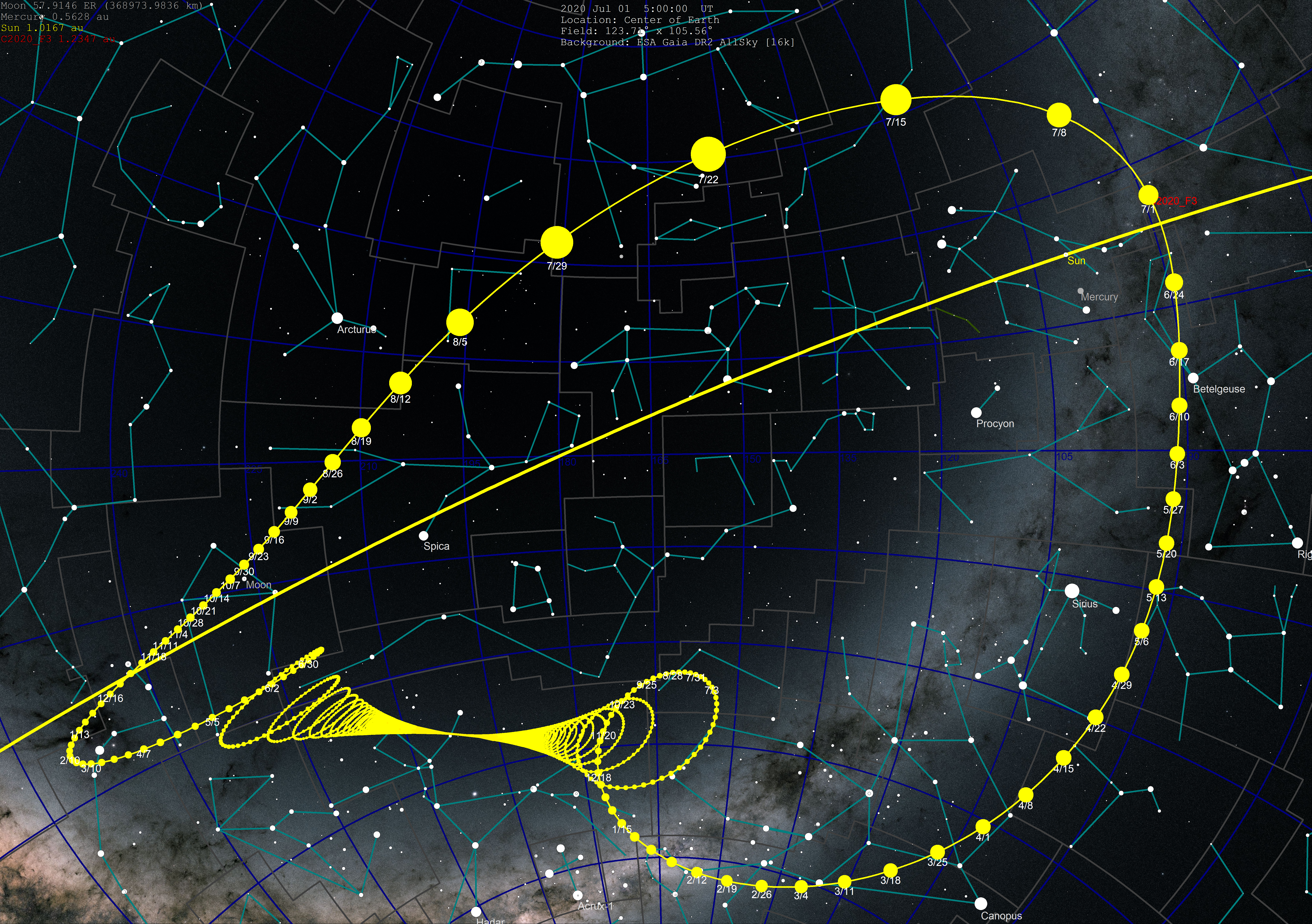
Comet's position in the sky – the retrograde loops are caused by parallax from Earth's annual motion around the Sun; the most apparent movement occurs when the comet is closest to Earth

Animation of C/2020 F3's orbit around Sun
C/2020 F3 · Sun · Mercury · Venus · Earth · Mars

== In popular culture ==
The fictional comet Dibiasky on the 2021 film Don't Look Up was "very loosely" modelled after comet NEOWISE.

== Gallery ==
In chronological order:

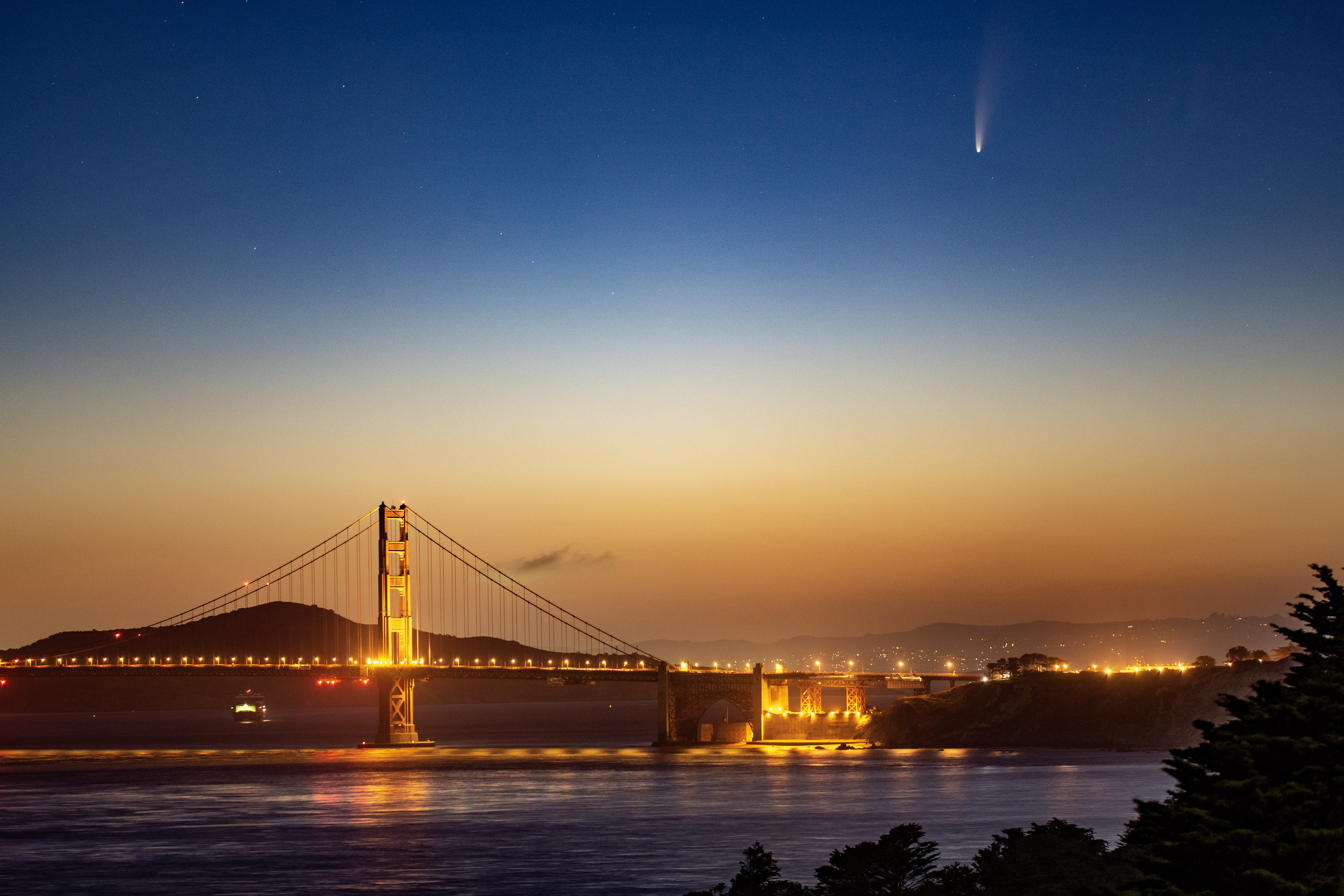
July 7, 2020, Golden Gate Bridge, California, United States

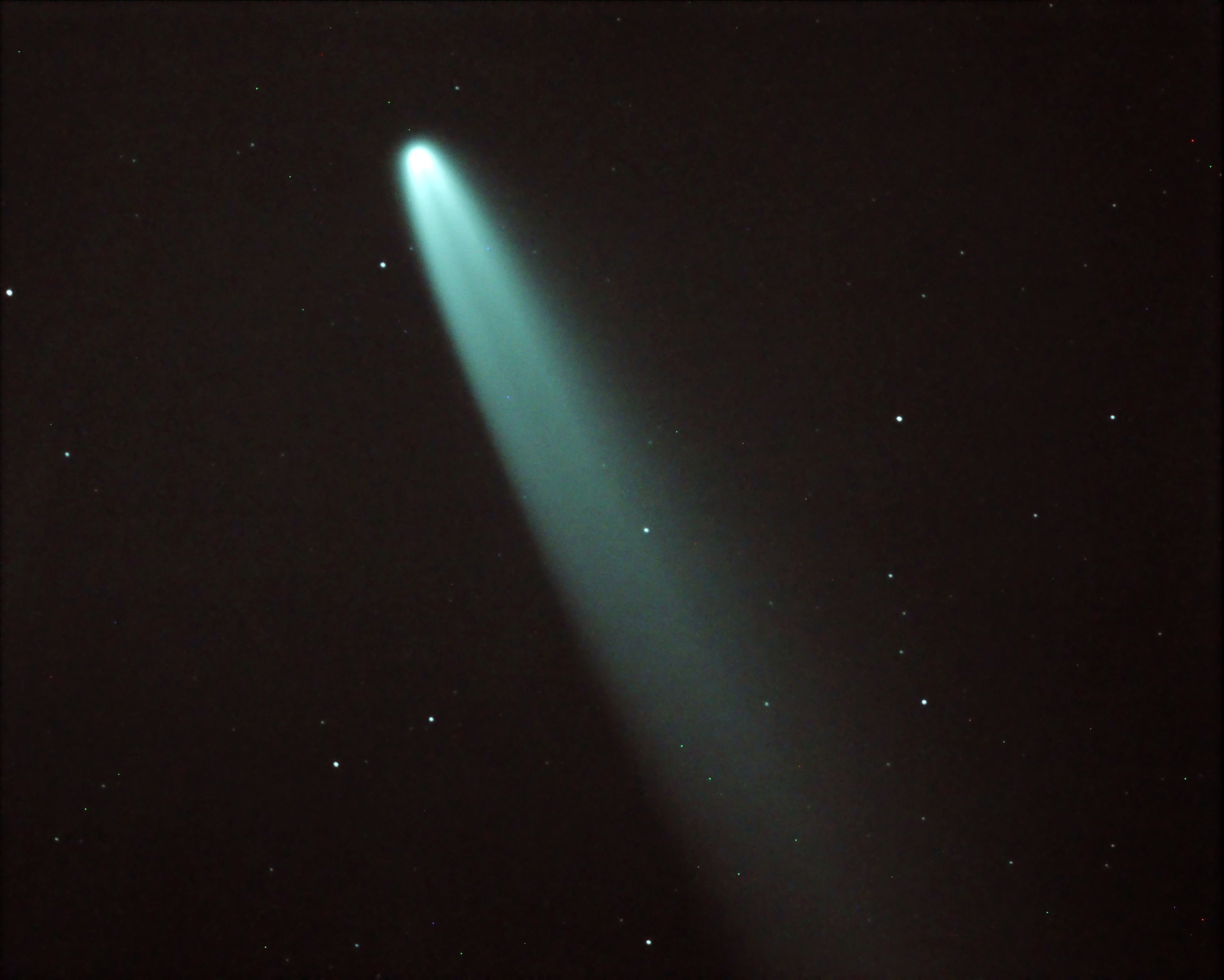
Inverted telescope image photographed on July 9, 2020

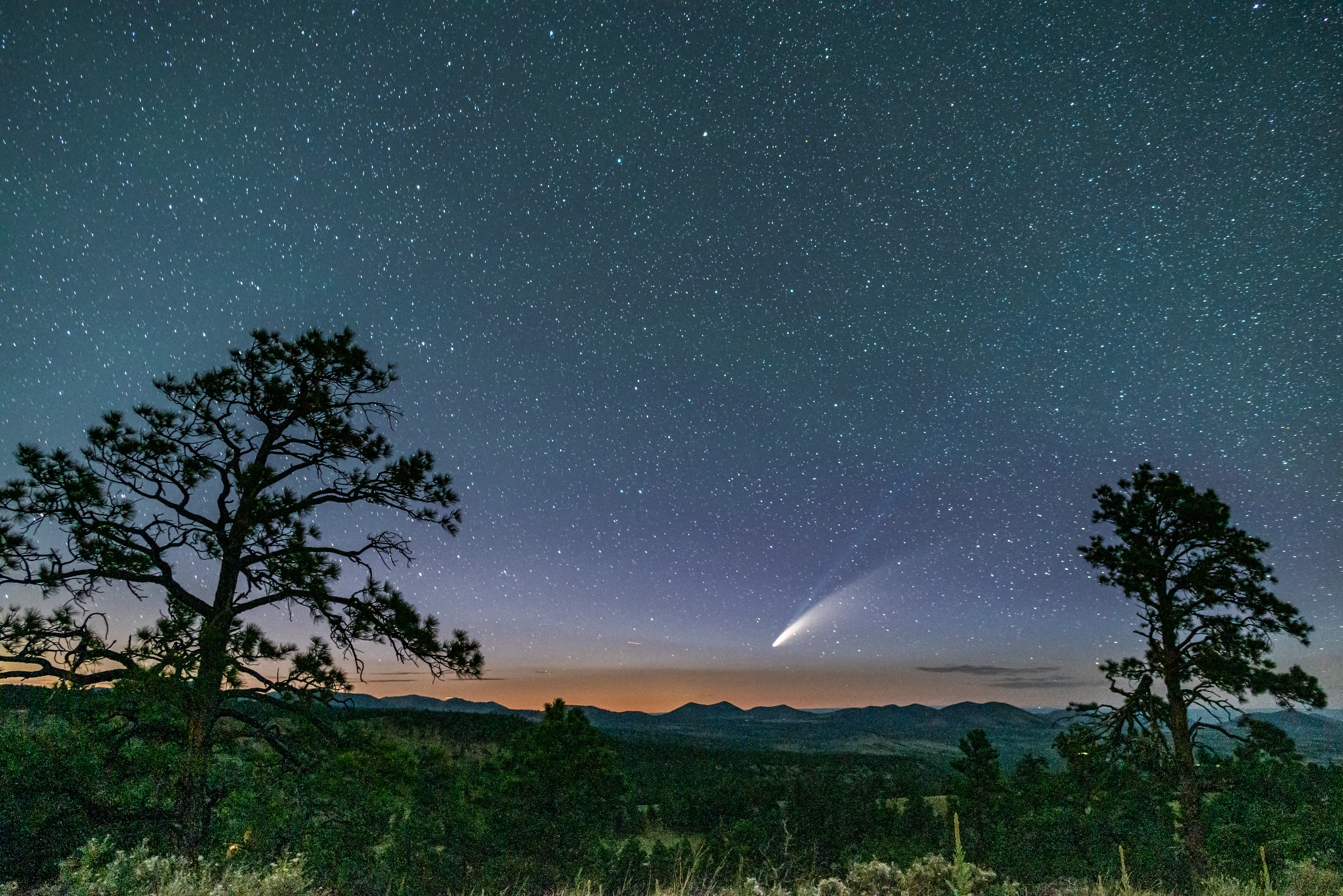
July 14, 2020 near the San Francisco Peaks in the Flagstaff dark sky preserve

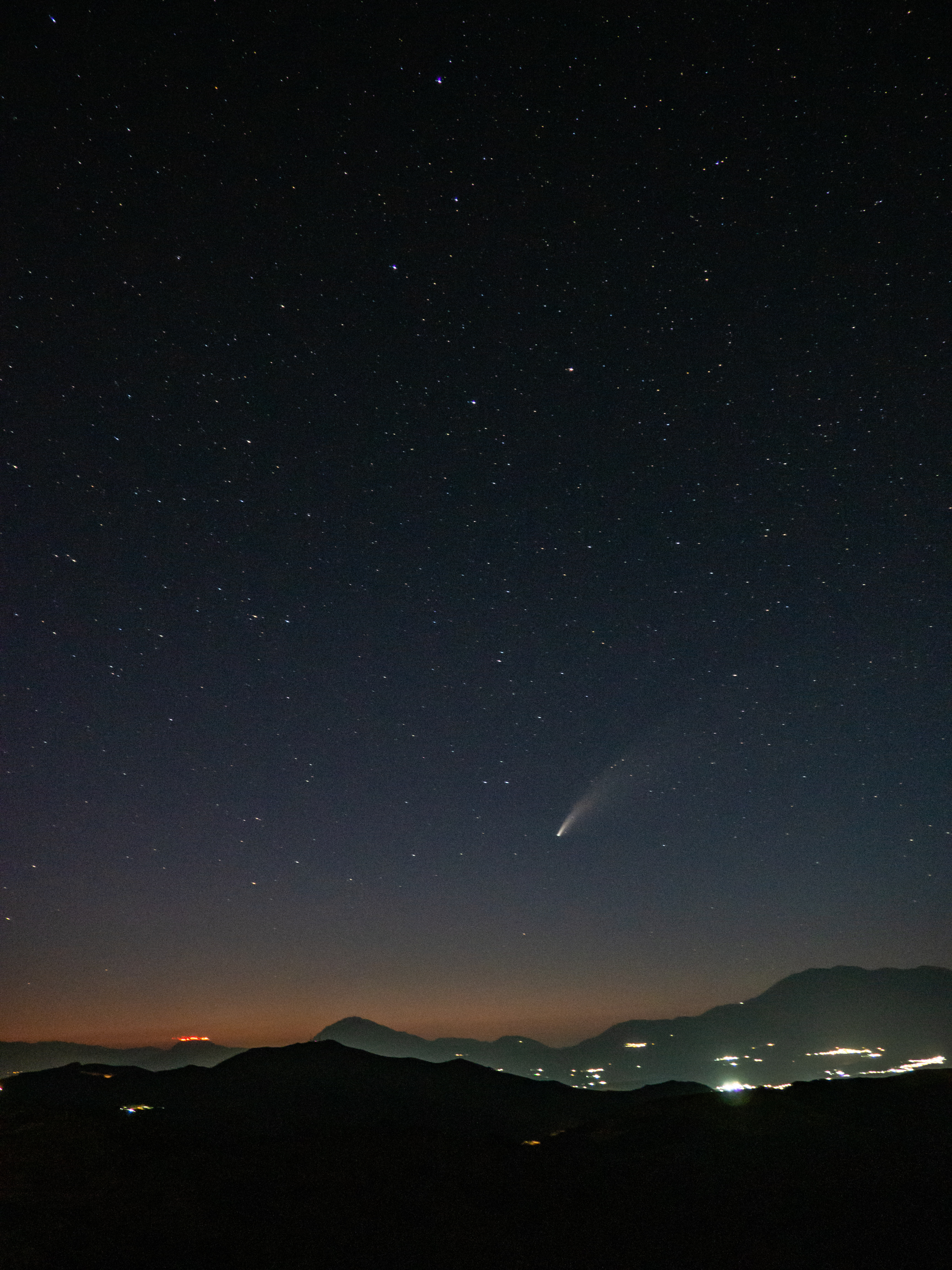
July 17, 2020, 18:59 UTC over Asterousia, Crete, as it entered into Ursa Major

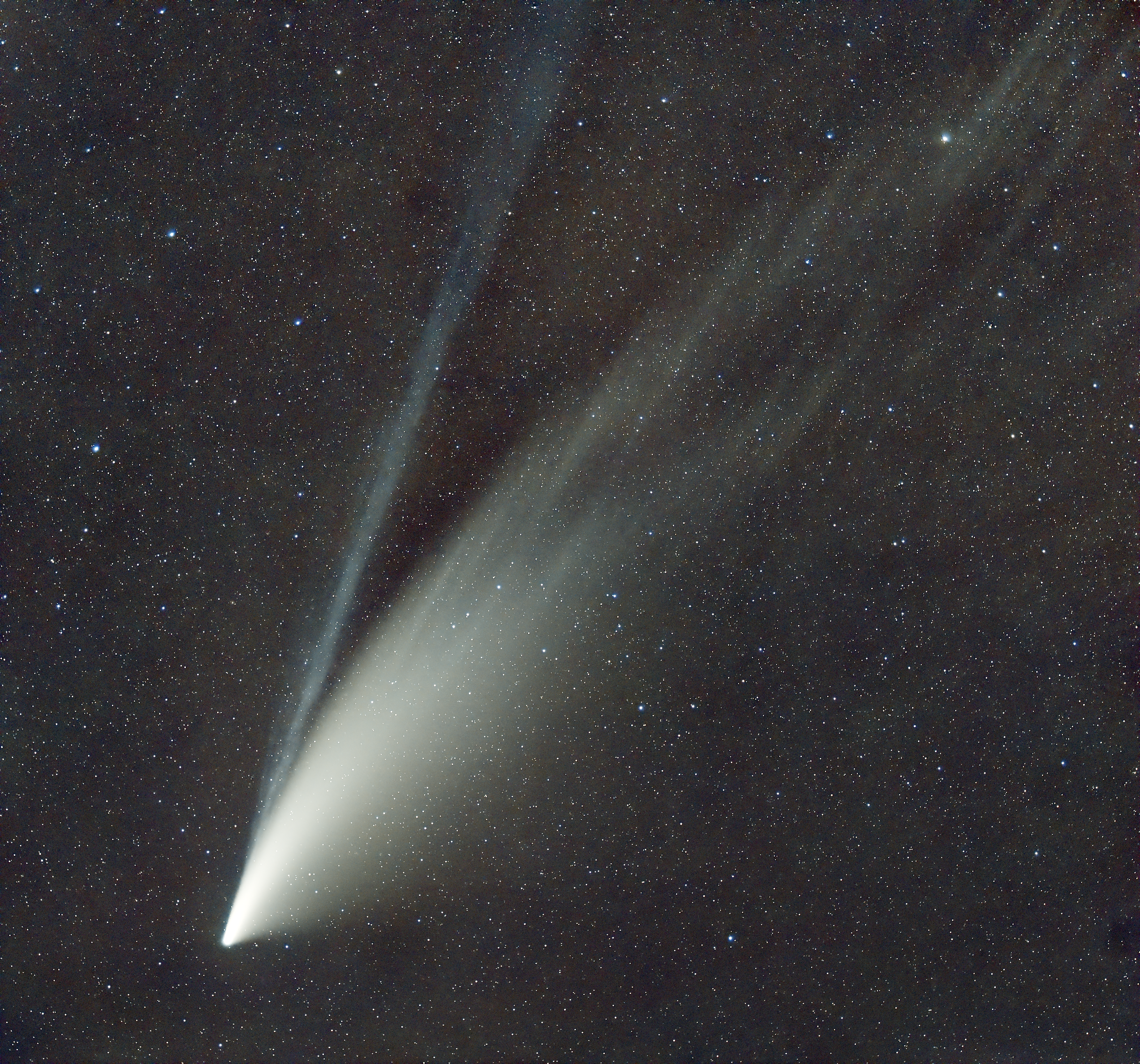
Comet C2020 NEOWISE 17-07-2020 20:51:57 UTC La Canada Observatory

Midnight, July 18, 2020 – in a time-lapse taken from the Shenandoah National Park, Virginia, U.S. the view was rotating because the lens was on a tracking mount

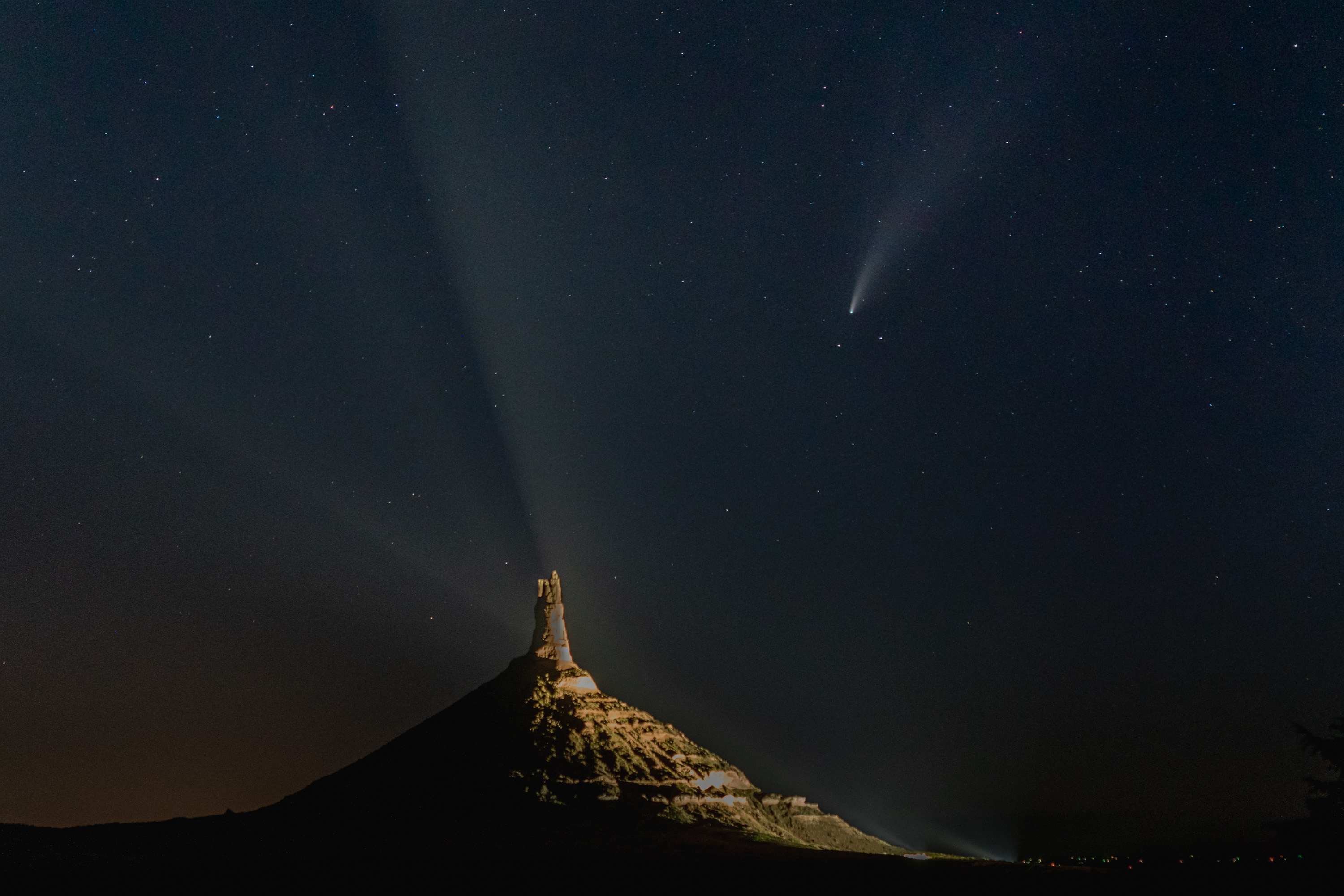
Above Chimney Rock on July 18, 2020

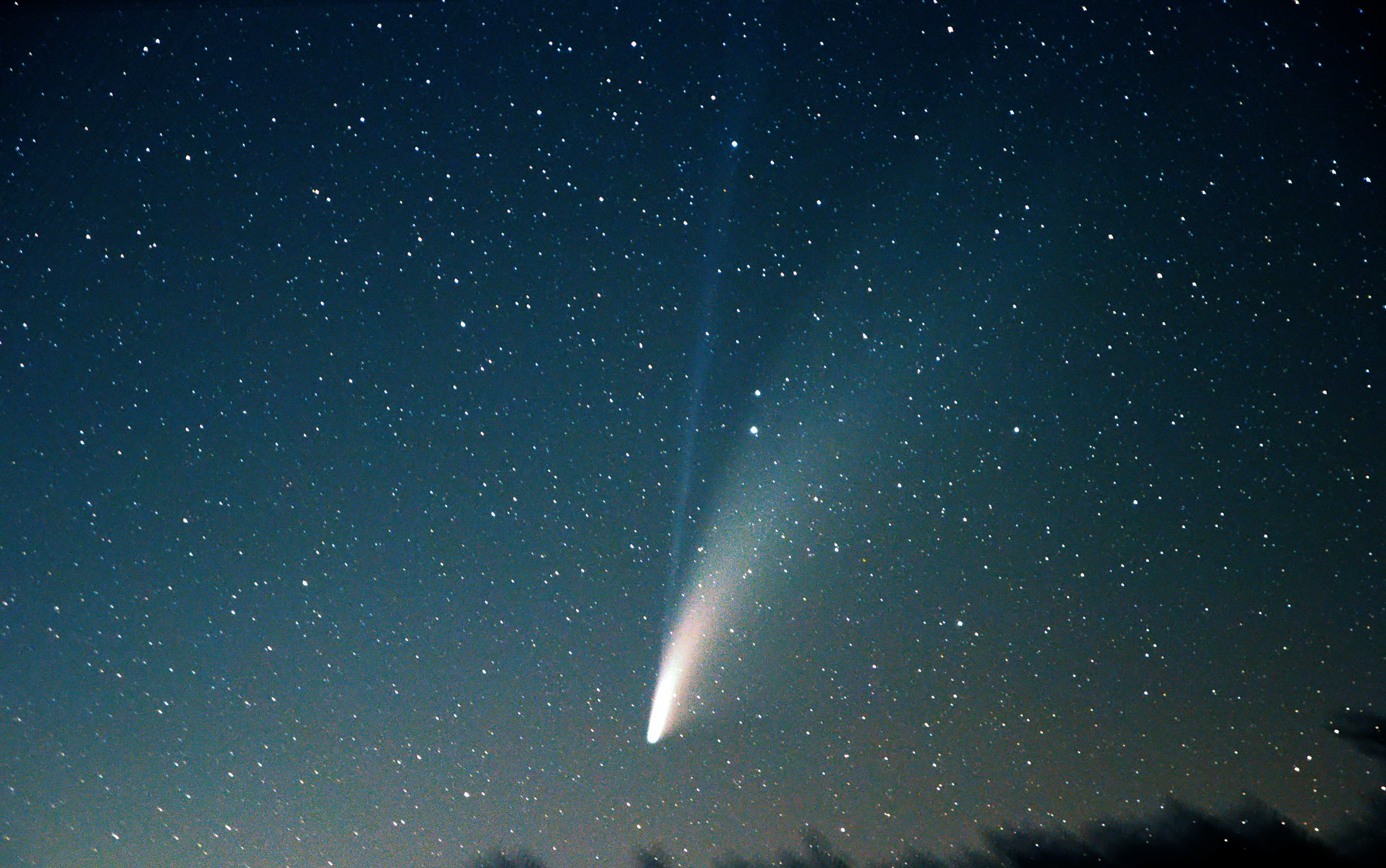
July 19, 2020 in Villanovaforru (Sardinia, Italy)

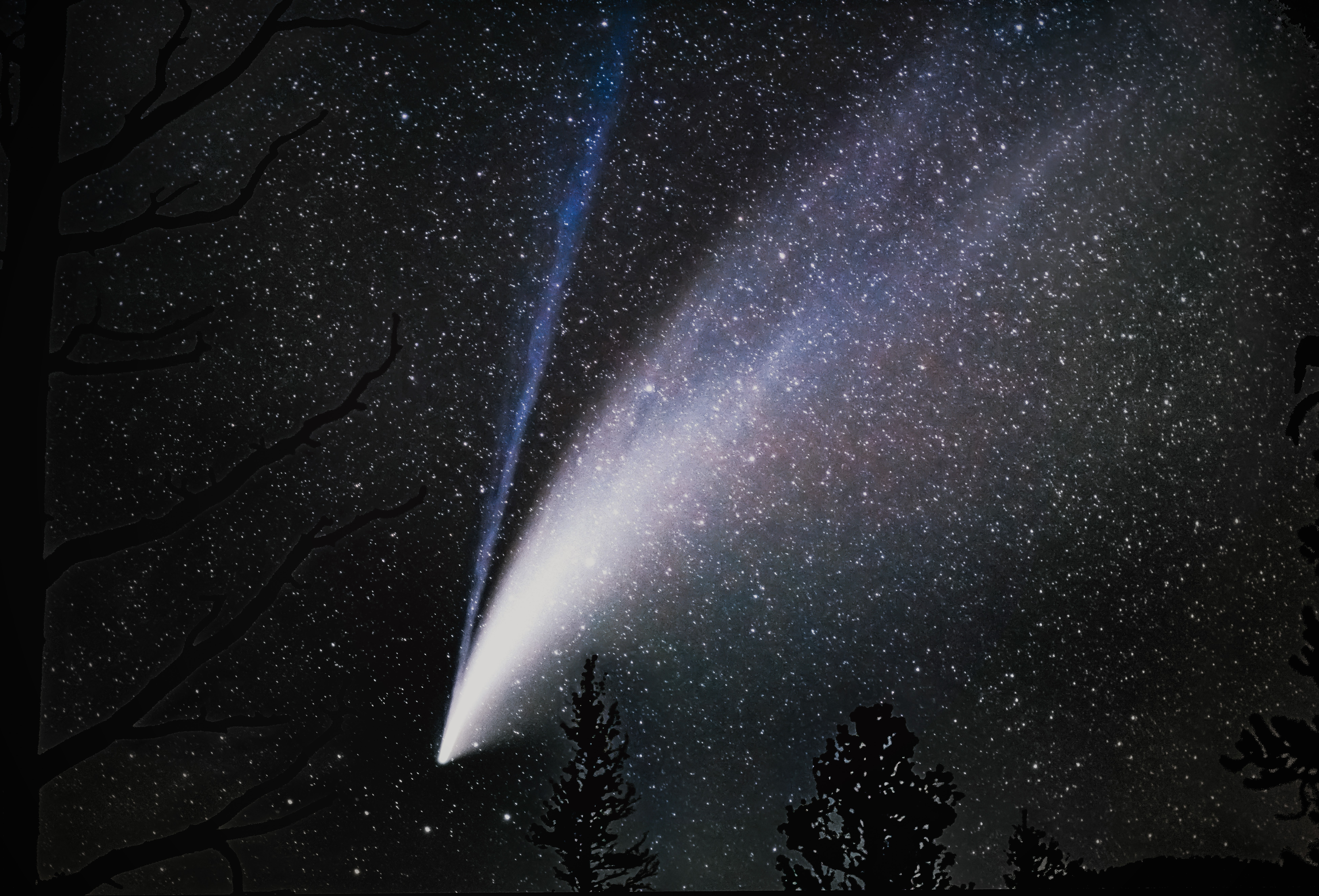
NEOWISE from the Eastern Sierra Mountains – July 20, 2020

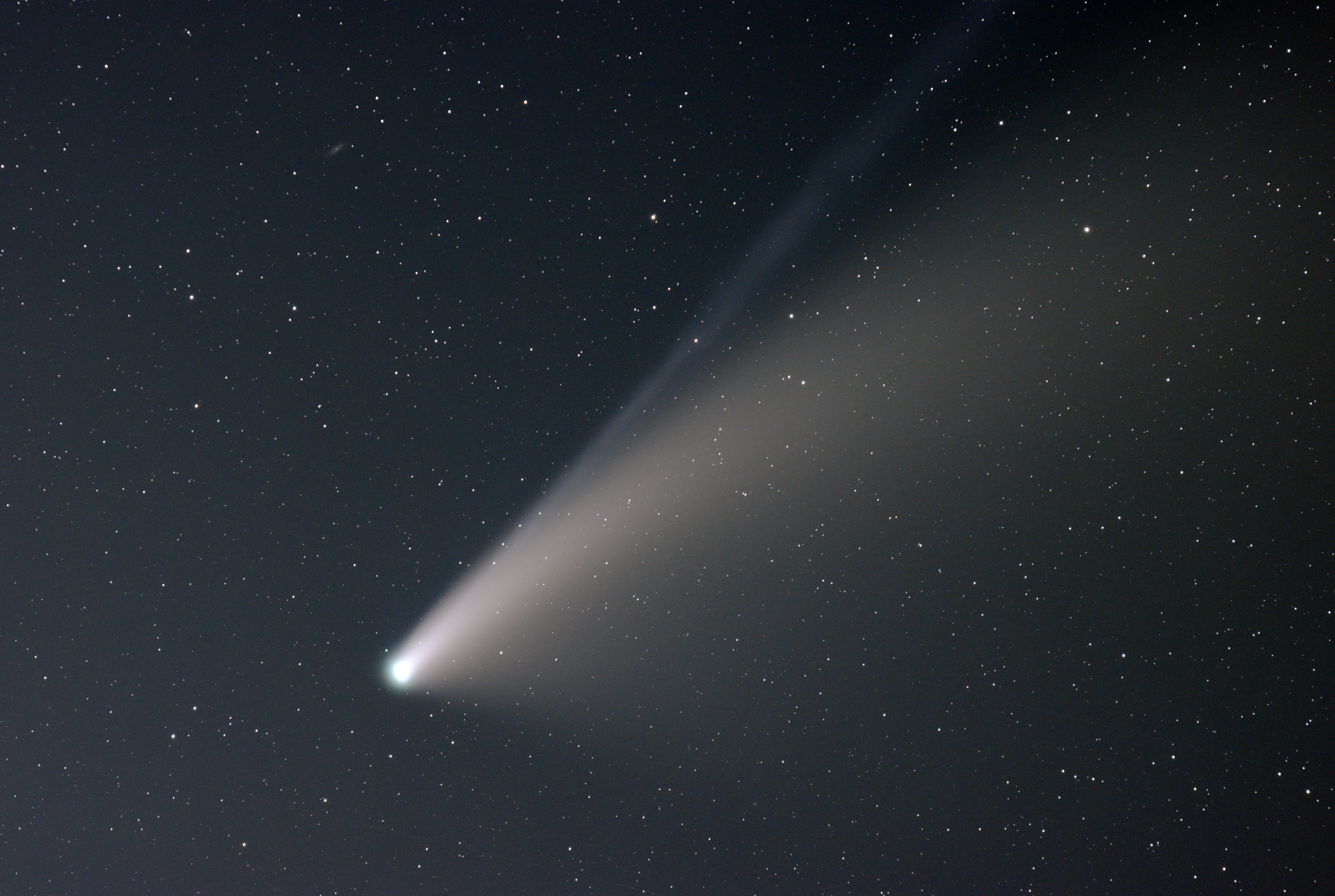
July 21, 2020 in Quebec, Canada

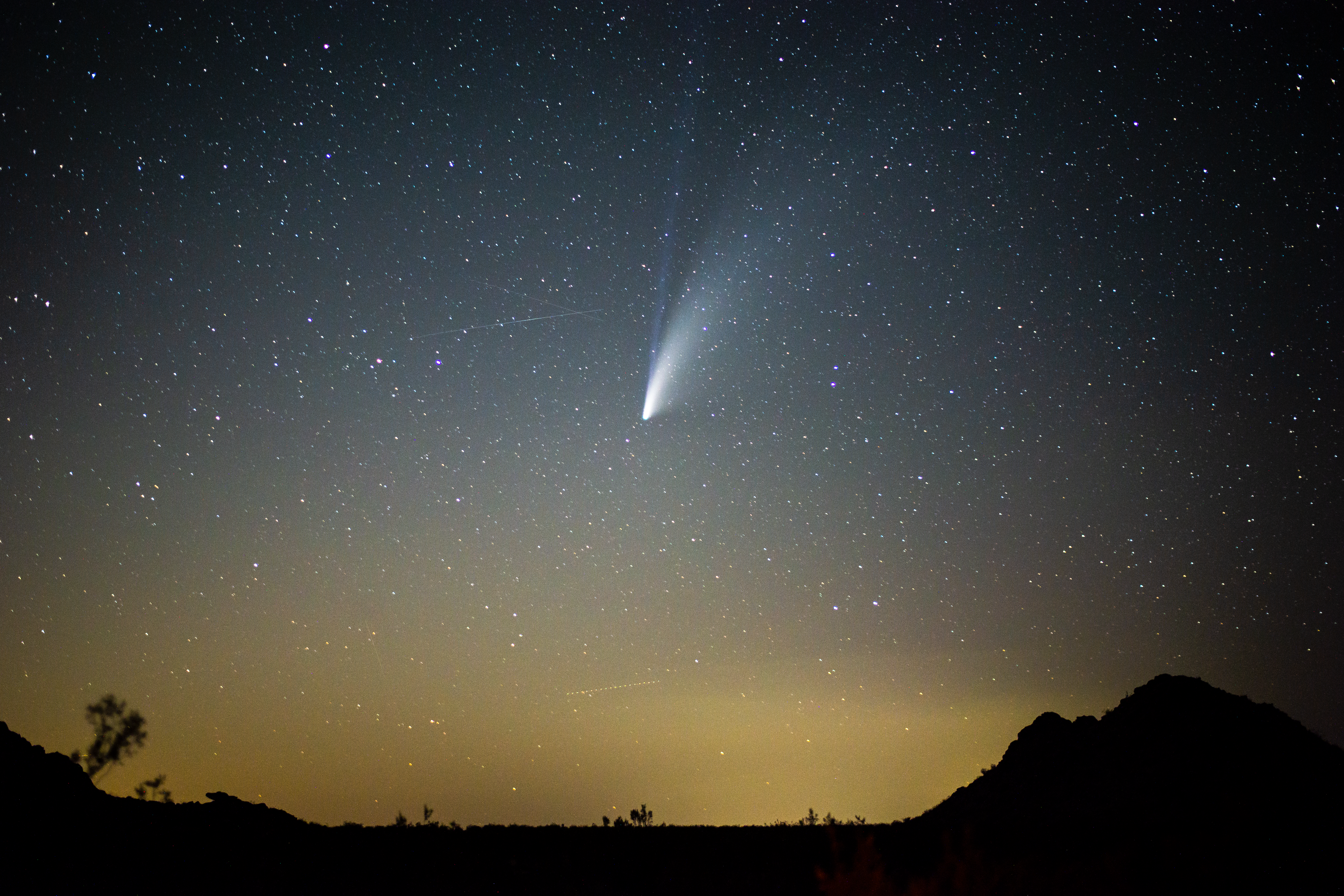
Joshua Tree National Park, a dark-sky preserve, on July 21, 2020

Time lapse from Balikesir, Turkey on July 22, 2020

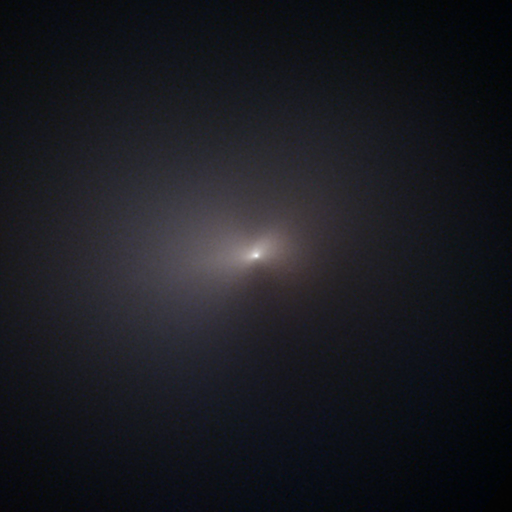
Hubble image taken on August 8, 2020

== See also ==
- Lists of comets
- Comet Tsuchinshan–ATLAS (C/2023 A3) – Also known as the Great Comet of 2024
- C/2024 G3 (ATLAS) – Also known as the Great Comet of 2025
