= Blair Jenkins =

Scottish broadcasting executive (born 1957)

Blair Jenkins OBE (born 1957 in Elgin, Scotland) is a Scottish former journalist who served as chief executive of Yes Scotland in the campaign for a "Yes" vote in the 2014 Scottish independence referendum. Previously, he was Director of Broadcasting at STV, and Head of News and Current Affairs at both STV and BBC Scotland. He chaired the Scottish Broadcasting Commission in 2007–2008 and the Scottish Digital Network Panel.

In June 2012, Jenkins was appointed chief executive of Yes Scotland. He is not a member of any political party and has not previously been involved with any political campaign.

== Journalism career ==
Jenkins was named Young Journalist of the Year at the Scottish Press Awards in 1977. He spent time with BBC News in London before moving on to STV. He went on to serve as Director of Broadcasting at STV, and Head of News and Current Affairs at both STV and BBC Scotland. He later chaired the Scottish Broadcasting Commission in 2007–2008 and the Scottish Digital Network Panel.

== Honours ==
In the Queen's Birthday Honours List 2010 he was made an OBE for services to broadcasting.
