= Swan Valley =

Swan Valley may refer to:

In Australia:

- Swan Valley (Western Australia), a region
- Swan Valley Nyungah Community

In Canada:

- Swan River Valley, a valley between the Duck and Porcupine Mountains in Manitoba
- Swan Valley Stampeders, a Manitoba Junior Hockey League team

In the United States:

- Swan Valley, Idaho
- Swan Valley High School, Saginaw, Michigan

== See also ==
- Swan (disambiguation)
