= Little Swan River =

Little Swan River may refer to one of the following rivers or places:

- Canada
  - Little Swan River (Ontario), a river
  - Little Swan River, Saskatchewan, a settlement
- United States
  - Little Swan River (Minnesota), a river

== See also ==
- Swan River (disambiguation)
