= The Swans =

The Swans may refer to:

- Swans (band), American rock band formed in 1982
- The Swans as a nickname of Swansea City A.F.C., a Welsh association football club formed in 1912
- The Swans as a nickname of Sydney Swans, an Australian Rules football club founded in 1874
- The Swans, a title given by author Truman Capote to refer to a group New York City socialites

== See also ==
- Feud: Capote vs. The Swans, the second season of the American anthology television series Feud
- Swan (disambiguation)
