= Swan Township =

Swan Township may refer to:

- Swan Township, Warren County, Illinois
- Swan Township, Noble County, Indiana
- Swan Township, Taney County, Missouri
- Swan Township, Holt County, Nebraska
- Swan Township, Vinton County, Ohio

== See also ==
- Swan (disambiguation)
