= Swan River =

Swan River may refer to:

Australia

- Swan River (Western Australia)
  - Swan River Colony, a British settlement on the river, later became Perth

Canada

- Swan River (Manitoba–Saskatchewan)
- Swan River, Manitoba
- Swan River Airport, servicing the town of Swan River in Manitoba
- Swan River (electoral district), a provincial electoral district in Manitoba

Pakistan

- Soan River, also spelled as Swan River

United States

- Swan River (Colorado)
- Swan River (Michigan)
- Swan River (northern Minnesota), a tributary of the Mississippi
- Swan River (central Minnesota), a tributary of the Mississippi
- Swan River (Montana)
- Swan River (New York), on Long Island

== See also ==
- Little Swan River (disambiguation)
- Swan (disambiguation)
