= Wild Swans (disambiguation) =

Wild Swans is a 1991 autobiographical novel by Jung Chang.

Wild Swan or Wild Swans may also refer to:

- Swan, a bird
- "The Wild Swans", a 1838 fairy tale by Hans Christian Andersen
  - The Wild Swans (1962 film), a Soviet animated film
  - The Wild Swans (1977 film), a Japanese anime fantasy film
  - The Wild Swans, a 1999 novel by Peg Kerr
  - Wild Swans (ballet), a 2003 ballet composed by Elena Kats-Chernin
- The Wild Swans at Coole, a poetry collection by W. B. Yeats
  - "The Wild Swans at Coole" (poem), a poem in the above collection
- The Wild Swans (band), a band from Liverpool, England
- The Wild Swan, a 2016 album by Foy Vance
- "Wild Swan", a 1988 song by Magnum off the album Wings of Heaven
- HMS Wild Swan, two ships of the Royal Navy
- Wild Swans (2023 film), an Indian Boro-language drama film

== See also ==
- Swan (disambiguation)
