= Koppin =

Defunct American motor vehicle manufacturer

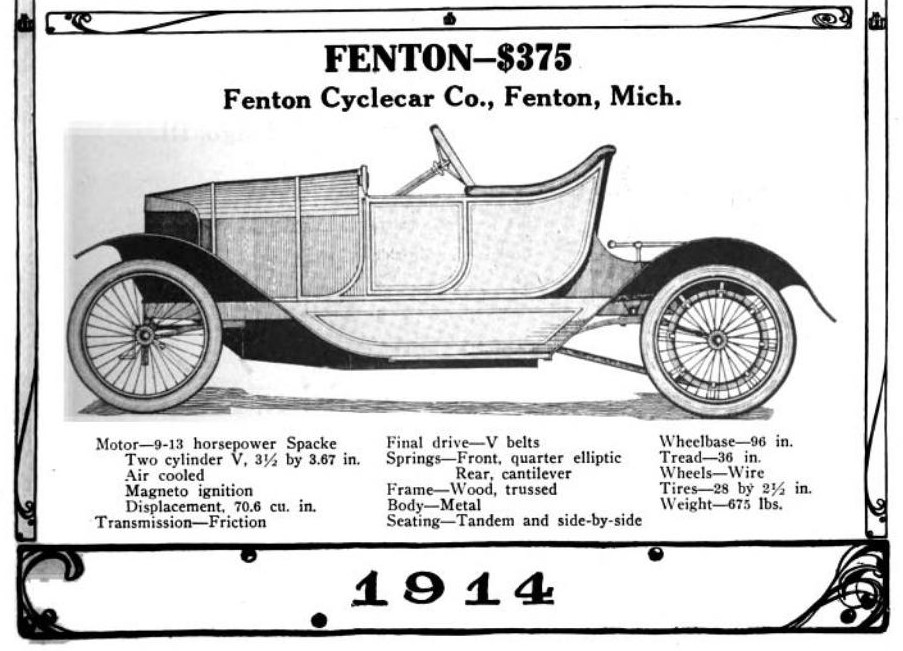
- The Koppin was identical to the Fenton

Overview
- Type: cyclecar
- Manufacturer: Koppin Motor Company
- Production: 1914
- Assembly: Fenton, Michigan
- Designer: Oscar J. Howick

Body and chassis
- Related: Fenton, Signet

Chronology
- Predecessor: Fenton, Signet

The Koppin was a cyclecar built in Fenton, Michigan, by the Koppin Motor Company in 1914.

== History ==
The Koppin was a two-seater cyclecar that used a two-cylinder air-cooled Spacke DeLuxe engine of 1.2L capacity. It came equipped with a friction transmission. The vehicle was priced at $385, equivalent to $12,375 in 2025. The Koppin Motor Company was the successor to the Fenton Cyclecar Company, the car also called the Signet in early advertising.

Oscar J. Howick, who had earlier worked for Lozier and Packard, was the designer of the Fenton. The company was organized by auto salesman George Jenks. When Jenks died on March 23, 1914, the company was reorganized by H.S. Koppin, who also owned the empty A.J. Phillips factory that production was moved to. The vehicle was renamed the Koppin Model A roadster. The Koppin factory was destroyed by fire in September 1914. Koppin carried on until the end of 1914 when the company was dissolved and he moved to Detroit.
