= Kodak Signet =

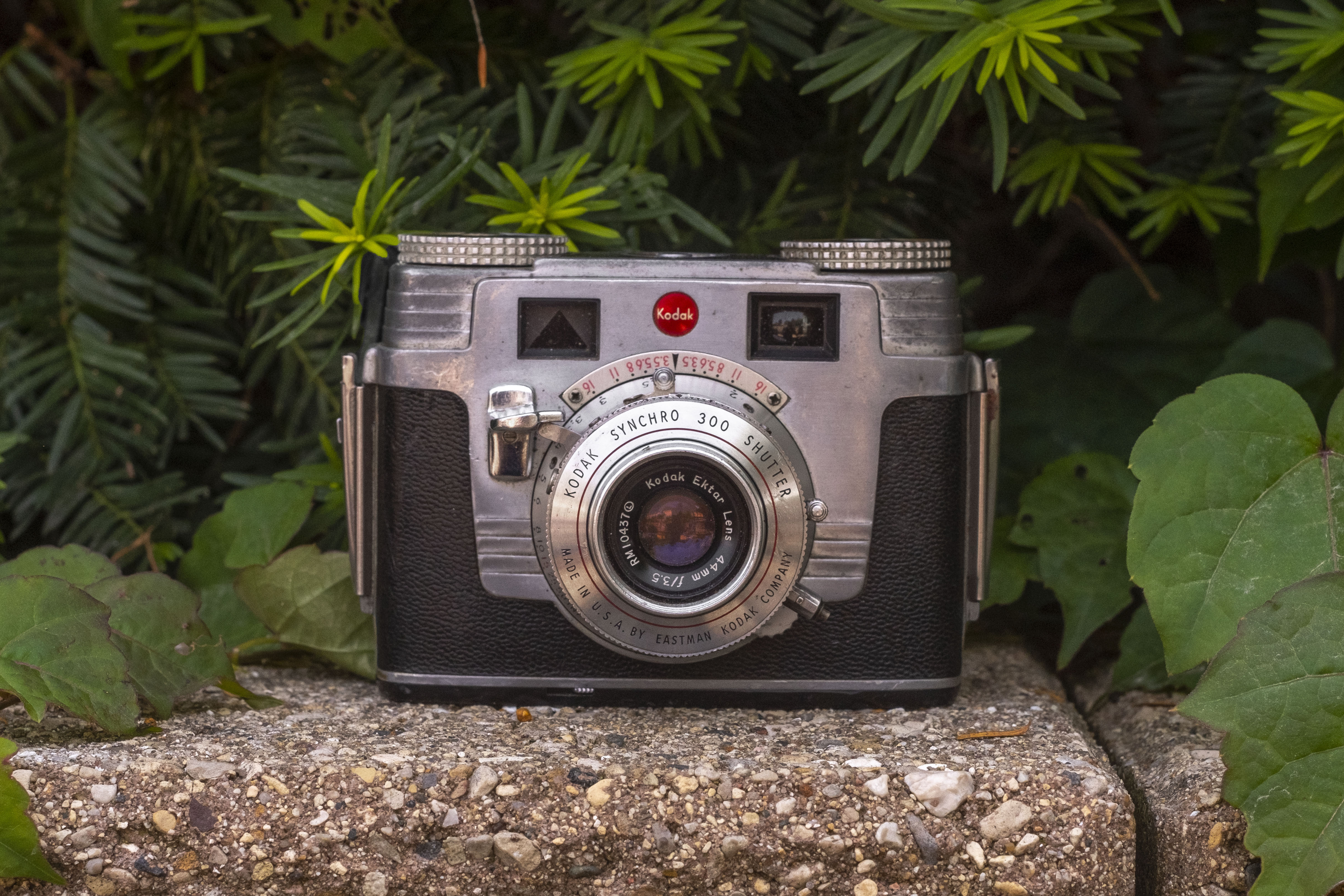
The Kodak Signet 35 was a 35mm rangefinder camera produced by the Eastman Kodak Company from 1951 to 1958.

The Kodak Signet series of 35mm cameras was Kodak's top American-made 35mm camera line of the 1950s, into the early 1960s. The designs were by Arthur H Crapsey. The first model was the Signet 35 made between February 1951 - March 1958.

The Signet series was positioned above the 35mm Pony series, and below the German made Kodak Retina series of cameras.

The models were the Signet 30, Signet 35, Signet 40, Signet 50, and Signet 80. Only the 35, 40 and the 80 had an integral rangefinder, with the latter accepting interchangeable lenes. All used a significant amount of plastic except the Signet 35 which was machined from an aluminum casting, and shared style and durability with the Kodak Chevron camera (continuation of the Kodak Medalist series).

== Features ==
The Signet 80 was Kodak's second attempt at offering a US made full camera system, the first being the ill-fated Ektra system. The Signet 80 including the accessory 35mm and 90mm lenses, cost about 75% of the cost of a comparable top-of-the-line Kodak Retina III system. The Signet line had quality control and design issues which limited appeal and durability. Despite limitations, the lenses are considered to be good, producing sharp images.

The Signet 35 has a coupled coincident image rangefinder, an excellent Ektar 44mm f3.5 lens with rear helicoid focus, automatic film stop counter with double exposure prevention, all built into a sturdy cast aluminum alloy body. The shutter must be cocked manually, and it only had four shutter speeds. The Signet 35 is very different in appearance, function, and durability, from the rest of the Signet line.

The Signet 40 was made from 1956 to 1959. It had six shutter speeds.

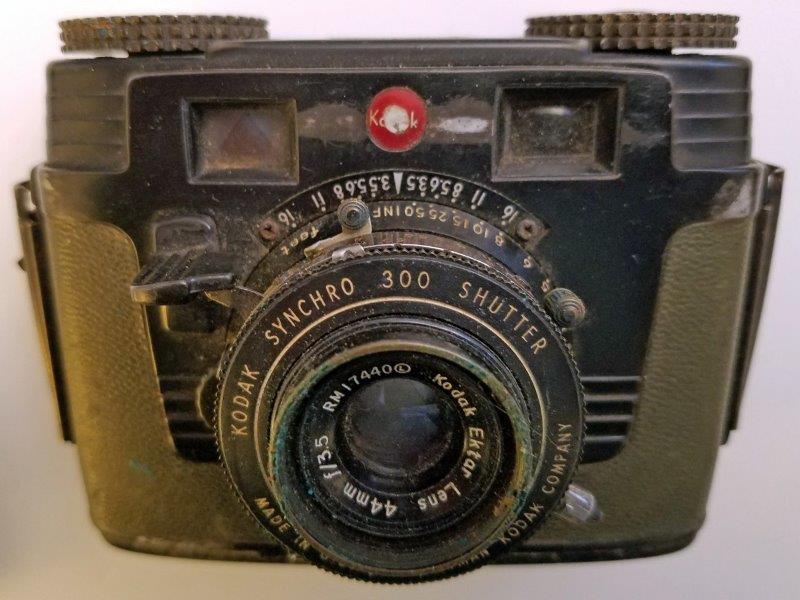

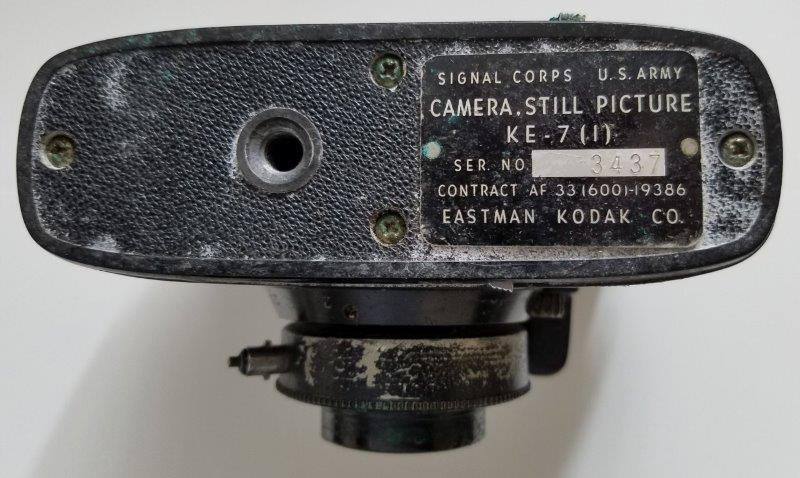
