= Signet (automobile) =

Defunct American motor vehicle manufacturer

Fenton Cyclecar Company
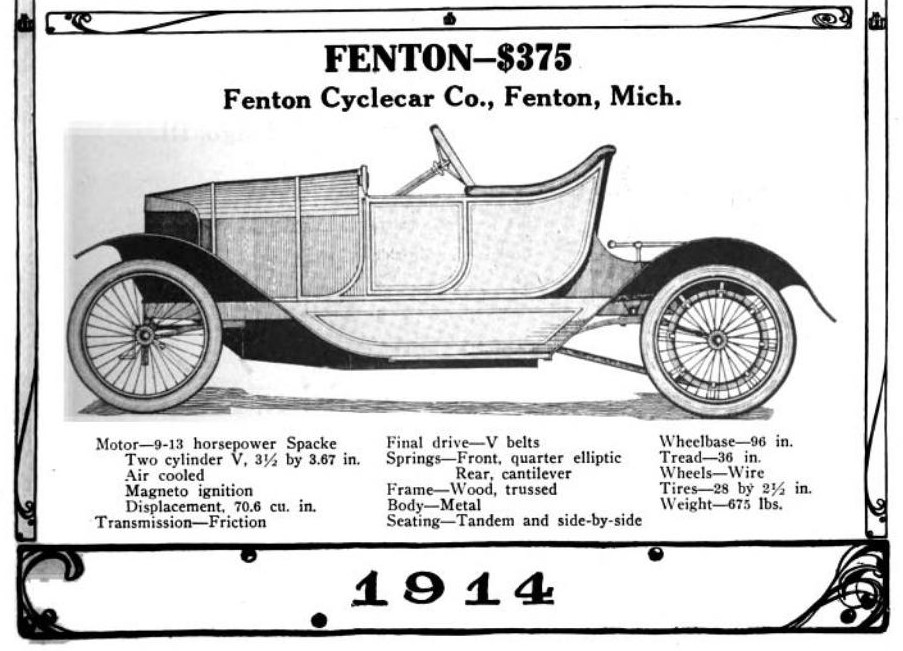
- 1914 Fenton Cyclecar advertisement in The American Cyclecar magazine. The same drawing was used for the Signet and Koppin cyclecars
- Formerly: Fenton Manufacturing Company
- Industry: Automotive
- Founded: 1913; 113 years ago
- Founder: George Jenks
- Defunct: 1914
- Fate: reorganized
- Successor: Koppin Motor Company
- Headquarters: Fenton, Michigan, United States
- Key people: Oscar J. Howick, George Jenks, H. S. Koppin
- Products: Cyclecars
- Production output: unknown (1913-1914)

The Signet cyclecar was the name used by Fenton Engineering Company of Fenton, Michigan from 1913 to 1914. In 1914 the name was changed to Fenton and was manufactured by the Fenton Cyclecar Company. In May 1914, The Fenton became the Koppin and was produced by the Koppin Motor Company until September 1914.

== History ==
Oscar J, Howick, formerly of Lozier and Packard, developed the Signet cyclecar with a Spacke DeLuxe twin-cylinder air-cooled engine, belt drive and friction transmission. The body styling with a deep vee front, full doors and fenders, and leather upholstery was more elegant than the average cyclecar. The wheelbase was 96 inches and the tread 36-inches. Two passengers sat side-by-side in the cyclecar with a package shelf behind them. Introduced as the Fenton in November 1913, the price was $375, equivalent to $12,216 in 2025.

George Jenks, a former automobile salesman, was the mover behind the Fenton and organized the Fenton Cyclecar Company to succeed Fenton Engineering Company to market the car. On March 23, 1914, tragedy struck with the sudden death of George Jenks. The Fenton Cyclecar Company was reorganized within two months as the Koppin Motor Company by H.S. Koppin, who owned the former A. J. Phillips plant in Fenton. The Fenton became the Koppin until September 1914, when the plant was destroyed by fire.
