= Scottish Broadcasting Commission =

The Scottish Broadcasting Commission (Scottish Gaelic: Coisisean craolaidh na h-Alba, Scots: Scots Braidcastin Commeesion) was established by the Scottish Government in August 2007. Its purpose is to conduct an independent investigation into television production and broadcasting in Scotland, and to define a strategic way forward for the industry. All commissioners are to be unpaid.

== Members ==
The commission is to be chaired by Blair Jenkins, former Head of News and Current Affairs at BBC Scotland and former Director of Broadcasting at STV.

The ordinary members are:

- Chris Ballance, former Green MSP, playwright, member of the Scottish Society of Playwrights and the Writers' Guild of Great Britain
- Norman Drummond, former BBC National Governor for Scotland and Chairman of the Broadcasting Council for Scotland
- Peter Fraser, Baron Fraser of Carmyllie, former Conservative MP, former Lord Advocate, convener of the Fraser Inquiry
- Murray Grigor, writer and film director
- Henry McLeish, former Labour First Minister
- Ray Michie, Baroness Michie of Gallanach, a Gaelic-speaker and a member of An Comunn Gàidhealach, former Vice-Chairman of the Scottish Liberal Democrats
- Professor Seona Reid, Director of Glasgow School of Art and former Director of the Scottish Arts Council
- Elaine C Smith, actress
- David Wightman, chief executive of computer games company Edgies, member of the Screen Industry Summit Group

The Scottish Broadcasting Commission published their final report on the Morning of 8 September 2008 in Edinburgh, Scotland.

== See also ==
- Gaelic broadcasting in Scotland
