= Scottish Wide Area Network =

The Scottish Wide Area Network (SWAN) is the secure network for Scotland's public services. More than 6,000 sites are connected by the network.

After the tendering process concluded in March 2013, one of the parties launched a legal challenge, which was dropped in February 2014.

== History ==
NHS Scotland previously used the N3 national communications network supplied by British Telecom (BT).

The procurement process for a new network began in October 2012. On 21 March 2013, three bidders were announced as having been shortlisted: BT, a partnership of Cable & Wireless Worldwide with Virgin Media Business, and a partnership of Capita with Updata Infrastructure. After a preferred bidder was selected, BT served NHS National Services Scotland (NSS) with a summons, seeking a re-run of the tendering process.

In January 2014 the case was heard at the Court of Session in Edinburgh. The court found in favour of NSS, and the following month BT decided not to appeal the decision. NSS announced the award of the contract to Capita-Updata, who had been their preferred bidder. In November 2014 BT and NSS released a statement to indicate the matter was settled.

The first phase of the network was to involve the NHS and six local authorities. By October 2015 there were 3,200 sites connected to the network. By February 2016, the rollout was 11 months behind schedule. In March 2016, the contract was worth an estimated value of up to £325 million over a nine-year period. In 2017, CityFibre were also involved in the connecting sites. In 2020 Capita secured several contract renewals.

In 2023, BT became the sole provider of the network, after an agreement was reached to cover a six-year period.

SWAN connects more than 6,000 sites across Scotland, including every hospital and ambulance station, also GP surgeries, community pharmacies, local councils premises and schools.
