= Cygnet (disambiguation) =

A cygnet is a young swan.

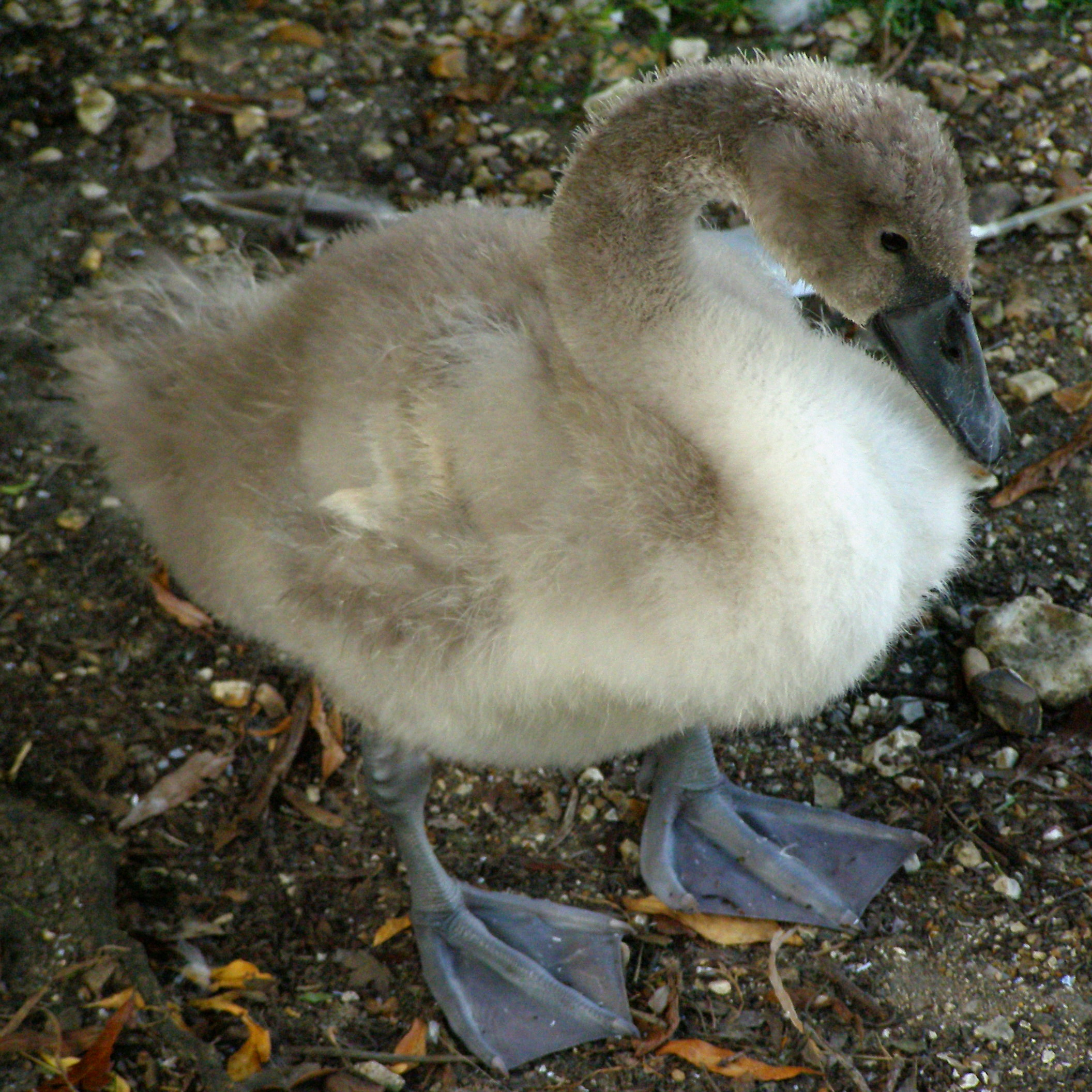
A mute swan cygnet.

Cygnet may also refer to:

== Places ==
- Cygnet Island, a small islet in south-eastern Australia
- Cygnet, Ohio, a village in the United States
- Cygnet River, South Australia, a locality on Kangaroo Island
- Cygnet, Tasmania, a town in Australia

== Vehicles ==
- Cygnet (ship), several ships
- Aston Martin Cygnet, a City car manufactured by Aston Martin
- General Aircraft Cygnet, a 1930s British light aircraft
- Hawker Cygnet, a British ultralight biplane aircraft of the 1920s
- Roberts Cygnet, glider

== Other ==
- Como Theatre, former name cinema located at 16 Preston Street, Como, Western Australia
- Cygnet Committee, a song written by David Bowie in 1969
- Cygnet Rowing Club, a rowing club founded in 1890 on the River Thames in England
- Cygnet Theatre Company, a theatre company in San Diego, California
- AEA Cygnet, a tetrahedral kite designed by Dr. Alexander Graham Bell and flown by First Lieutenant Thomas Selfridge
- Cygnet Healthcare

== See also ==
- Golden Cygnet, a racehorse
- Sea and Sky Cygnet, an American amphibious ultralight trike design
- Signet (disambiguation)
