= C/2012 E2 (SWAN) =

Kreutz sungrazer comet

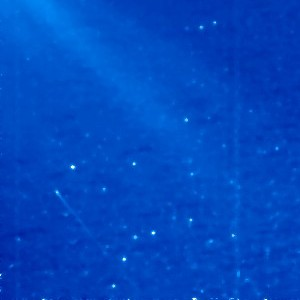
- C/2012 E2 (SWAN) on March 12, 2012 at 05:29:42 UT by the SECCHI inner Heliospheric Imager (HI-1) on the STEREO Behind observatory

Discovery
- Discovered by: SOHO; Vladimir Bezugly
- Discovery date: 8 March 2012

Orbital characteristics
- Epoch: 13 March 2012 (JD 2455999.5)
- Observation arc: 2 days (short arc)
- Number of observations: 43
- Perihelion: 0.00696 AU (1.50 R_{☉})
- Semi-major axis: −14±41 AU
- Eccentricity: 1.0005±0.001 (Note: The comet's orbit may be bound to the Sun with an eccentricity closer to 0.9992.)
- Inclination: 144.4°±0.6°
- Longitude of ascending node: 6.6°±3°
- Argument of periapsis: 82°±2°
- Mean anomaly: −0.04°±0.16°
- Last perihelion: 15 March 2012
- Earth MOID: 0.54 AU
- Jupiter MOID: 2.98 AU

Physical characteristics
- Mean radius: 0.04–0.34 km (0.025–0.211 mi)
- Apparent magnitude: 1.0 (2012 apparition)

Comet C/2012 E2 (SWAN) was a Kreutz sungrazer comet discovered by Vladimir Bezugly in publicly available images taken by the Solar Wind ANisotropies (SWAN) instrument on board the Solar and Heliospheric Observatory (SOHO). It is recognized for being the first Kreutz sungrazer observed in SWAN imagery.

== Discovery ==
On 8 March 2012, Ukrainian amateur astronomer Vladimir Bezugly reported an unknown comet in 3 images taken by the SWAN instrument on board the SOHO spacecraft. Further study of this object revealed that it was a Kreutz group sungrazer with a perihelion date on 15 March 2012. This was particularly interesting because no Kreutz sungrazer had ever been bright enough to be observed by the SWAN cameras, not even Comet C/2011 W3 (Lovejoy) which was visible to the naked-eye three months earlier. This meant that Comet SWAN had a chance of being an exceptionally bright comet.

== SECCHI and LASCO observations ==
The SECCHI HI1 camera on board the STEREO-B spacecraft was the first to observe the comet after the SWAN instrument. It entered the field of view on March 11 and appeared reasonably bright, though not as bright as it could have been.

The comet entered the visibility of SOHO's LASCO telescopes on 13 March, there too the comet did not appear exceptionally bright, it was fainter in comparison to Comet C/2011 W3 (Lovejoy) at this stage of its orbit. Though it certainly appeared brighter than most sungrazing comets of the Kreutz group. It reached a maximum apparent brightness of mag +1 before it declined in brightness due to disintegration. The comet did not survive perihelion.

SECCHI's COR instruments on both STEREO spacecraft also observed the comet's final moments.

== Other observations ==
The reason of the comet's brightness in SWAN remains unknown, though it is thought that the comet experienced an outburst a few days before discovery which rendered it much brighter than it was otherwise. No ground-based observations of the comet were available.

Due to a short 2-day observation arc, the long-term trajectory of the comet is poorly constrained. The orbital period is unknown with an orbital inclination of 144 degrees.

== See also ==
- List of Kreutz sungrazers
