= Updata =

British internet provider

Updata Infrastructure UK Ltd
- Type: Private Company
- Industry: Broadband Services
- Founded: 2003
- Defunct: 2014
- Fate: Acquired by Capita (April 2014)
- Successor: Capita
- Headquarters: Premier House; Warren Road; Reigate; Surrey; RH2 0BE; United Kingdom
- Key people: Richard Bennett (Founder/Director); Victor Baldorino (Founder/Director); Tim Pearson (Chairman)
- Website: Updata.Net

Updata Infrastructure UK Ltd was a privately held UK company providing Internet and broadband connectivity services, primarily to public sector markets. Updata’s headquarters were in Premier House, Reigate, Surrey and the company also had offices in Wales (Cefn Coed Business Park, Cardiff) and Scotland (Strathclyde Business Park, Bellshill).

In 2009/2010 Updata had revenues of £19.7m, an increase of 82% on the previous year.

Updata was acquired by Capita in 2014.

== History ==
Updata was founded in 2003 by Richard Bennett and Victor Baldorino.

In 2009, Updata received investment from UK private equity firm LMS Capital plc. Subsequently, in 2010, Tim Pearson, former CEO of RM plc, was appointed as Non-Executive Chairman.

On 1 April 2014 it was announced that the London-based professional services company Capita had acquired Updata for a cash consideration of £80m on a cash free, debt free basis. Subsequently, Updata was absorbed into the Capita I.T. Enterprise Services business.

== Activities ==
Updata initially focused on implementing local-loop unbundling in UK telephone exchanges, winning a number of contracts Over time, the company has developed a broad range of Internet and broadband services, aimed primarily at public sector clients. The company operates both as a direct supplier to public sector clients, and in partnership with larger IT services organisations such as Siemens, Logicalis and Fujitsu.

Updata had significant success with its focus on public sector contracts - offering low cost technology innovation via the competitive dialogue public-sector tendering process. As a result, they won a number of contracts with local authorities, education authorities and health service providers.

The company competed successfully for public sector business against major UK broadband suppliers. In 2010, Updata was awarded the contract to provide connectivity for the Hertfordshire Grid for Learning, displacing Virgin Media Business. This contract was valued at £17.1m over six years. In 2012, Updata won a 10-year, £81 million contract to manage and develop the IT network infrastructure and associated services for Essex County Council. The deal was won as a joint venture with Daisy Group (named Daisy Updata Communications (DUCL)) with 75 percent of the total contract value going to Updata.
