= C/2020 F8 (SWAN) =

Second brightest naked-eye comet of 2020

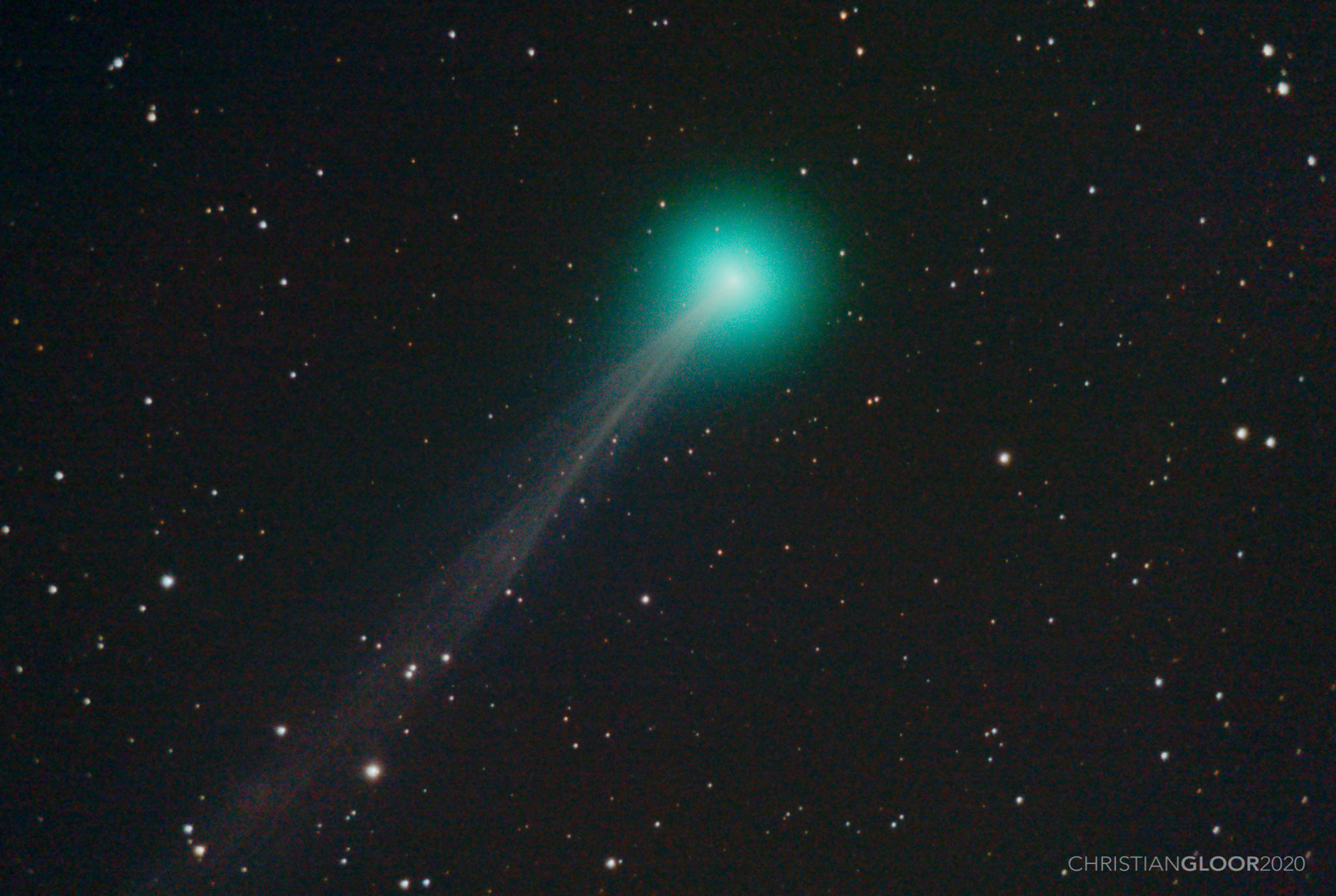
- Comet C/2020 F8 (SWAN) on May 1, 2020 from Indonesia

Discovery
- Discovered by: SOHO–SWAN; Michael Mattiazzo
- Discovery date: 25 March 2020

Designations
- Alternative designations: SOHO-3932

Orbital characteristics
- Epoch: 2020-Apr-26 (JD 2458965.5)
- Observation arc: 42 days
- Orbit type: Oort cloud
- Aphelion: ~1300 AU (outbound)
- Perihelion: 0.4303 AU (64 million km)
- Eccentricity: 0.99994
- Orbital period: Hyperbolic trajectory (inbound); ~17000 years (outbound)
- Inclination: 110.8
- Last perihelion: 27 May 2020
- Earth MOID: 0.1937 AU (29 million km; 75 LD)
- Jupiter MOID: 2.35 AU

Physical characteristics
- Dimensions: 0.4–0.8 km (0.25–0.50 mi)
- Mean diameter: 0.6 km (0.37 mi)
- Apparent magnitude: 4.7 (2020 apparition)

C/2020 F8 (SWAN), or Comet SWAN, is an Oort cloud comet that was discovered in images taken by the Solar Wind Anisotropies (SWAN) camera on 25 March 2020, aboard the Solar and Heliospheric Observatory (SOHO) spacecraft. In the glare of twilight, Comet SWAN is difficult to find with 50mm binoculars even though it is still near the theoretical range of naked eye visibility. The comet has dimmed since May 3. As of perihelion, the comet is very diffuse, does not have a visible nucleus and is not a comet that will be noticed by inexperienced observers. It is likely that the comet disintegrated.

== Observing ==
On April 28, 2020 it had an apparent magnitude of 7 and was too diffuse to be visible to the naked eye even from a dark site. The comet was also hidden by the glare of twilight, zodiacal light and atmospheric extinction. It was originally best seen from the Southern Hemisphere. It was expected to possibly reach 3rd magnitude in May, but instead hovered closer to magnitude 6. In either case it was near the glare of twilight, which made it appear significantly fainter. On May 2, the comet had reached a magnitude of 4.7 and had been detected with naked eye, the tail had a visual length of one degree and could be traced photographically for 6-8 degrees. After that the comet faded, probably as the nucleus of the comet fragmented. It passed through the celestial equator on 7 May, then it headed northward and it was near the 2nd magnitude star Algol on 20 May. It passed its perihelion on May 27, 2020.

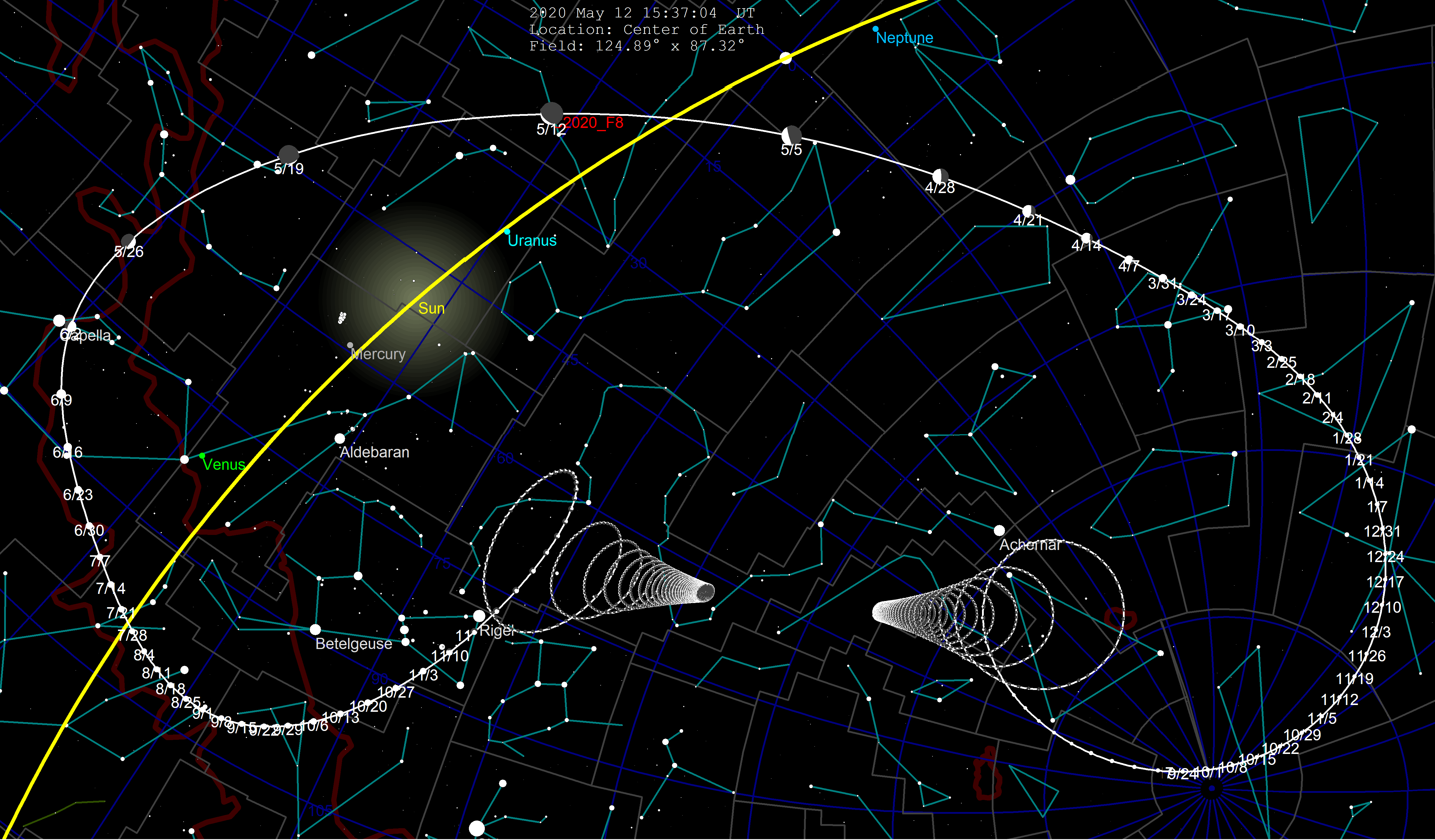
Sky trajectory with 7 week markers

== Orbit ==
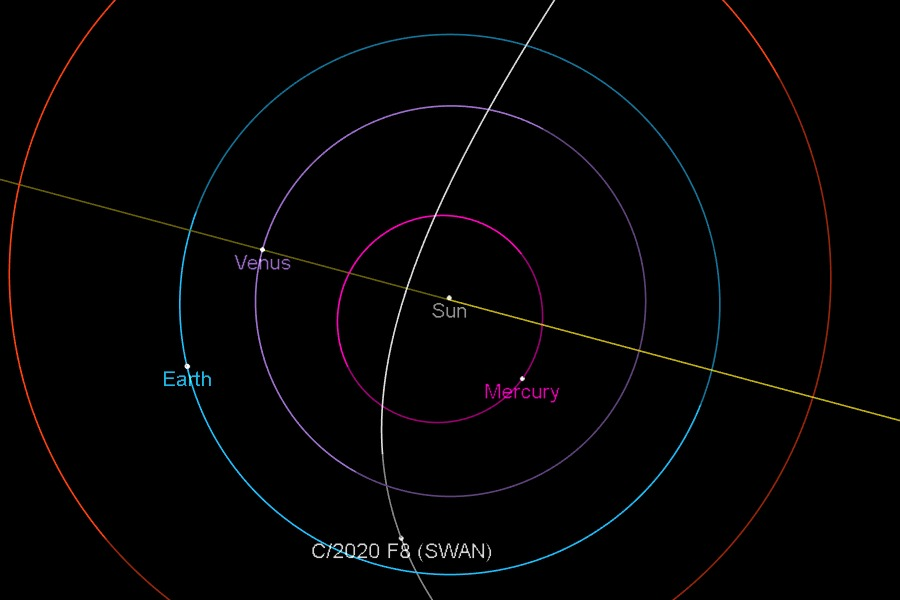
C/2020 F8 (SWAN)'s orbit

The Minor Planet Center initially listed the orbit as bound with $e<1$. With a short 18-day observation arc JPL listed the comet as hyperbolic with an eccentricity of 1.0009±0.001, but a longer observation arc was needed to refine the uncertainties and either confirm its hyperbolic trajectory, or determine its orbital period of thousands or millions of years. With a 40-day observation arc it was possible to determine that it came from the Oort cloud on a Hyperbolic trajectory and that the outbound orbit will last ~11,000 years.

On May 12, 2020, the comet passed about 0.56 AU (84 million km; 220 LD) from Earth. On May 27, 2020 the comet came to perihelion 0.43 AU (64 million km) from the Sun.

== Gallery ==
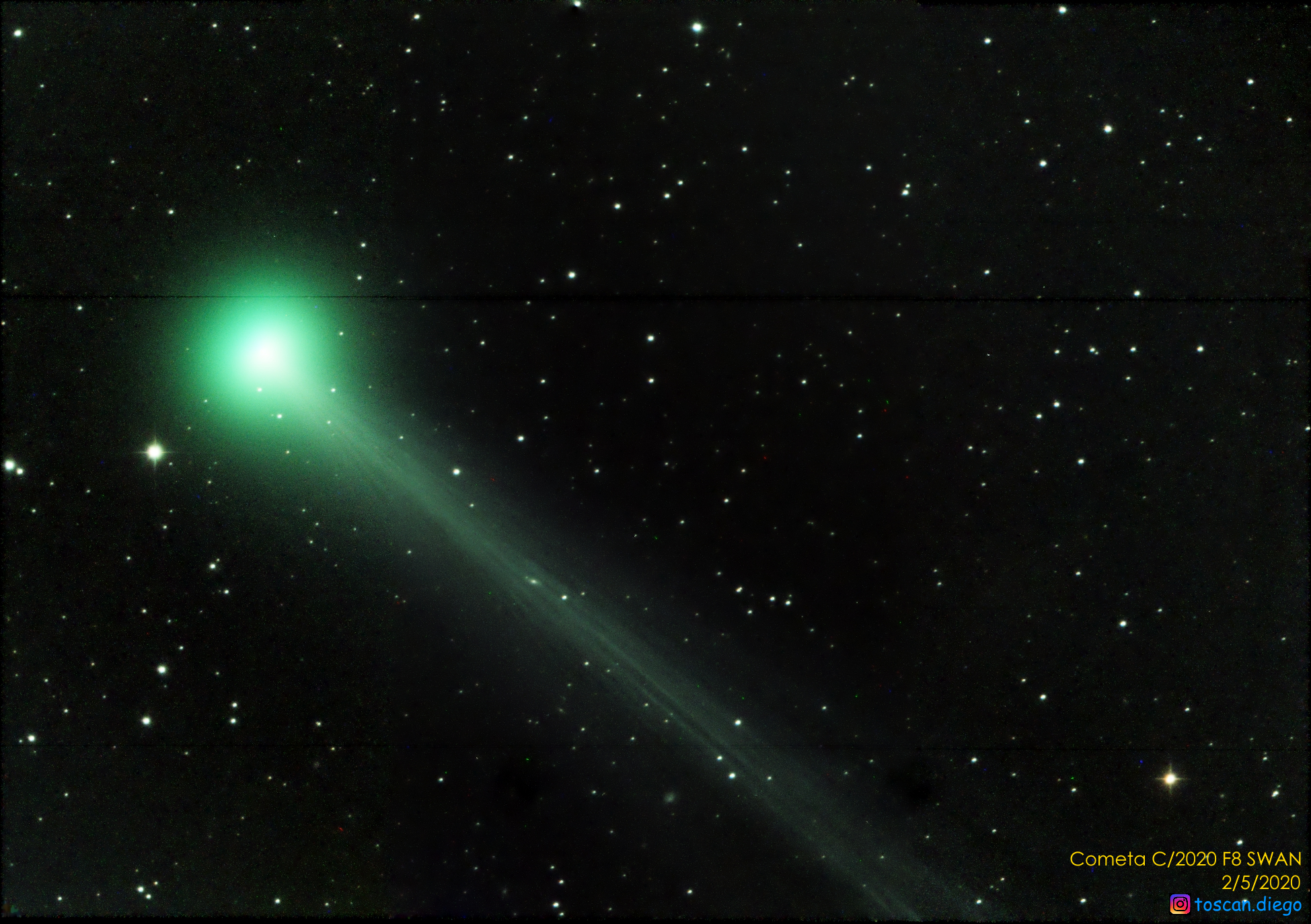
Photo taken on May 2, 2020
