= SOCATA Horizon =

French four-seat light aircraft

GY-80 Horizon
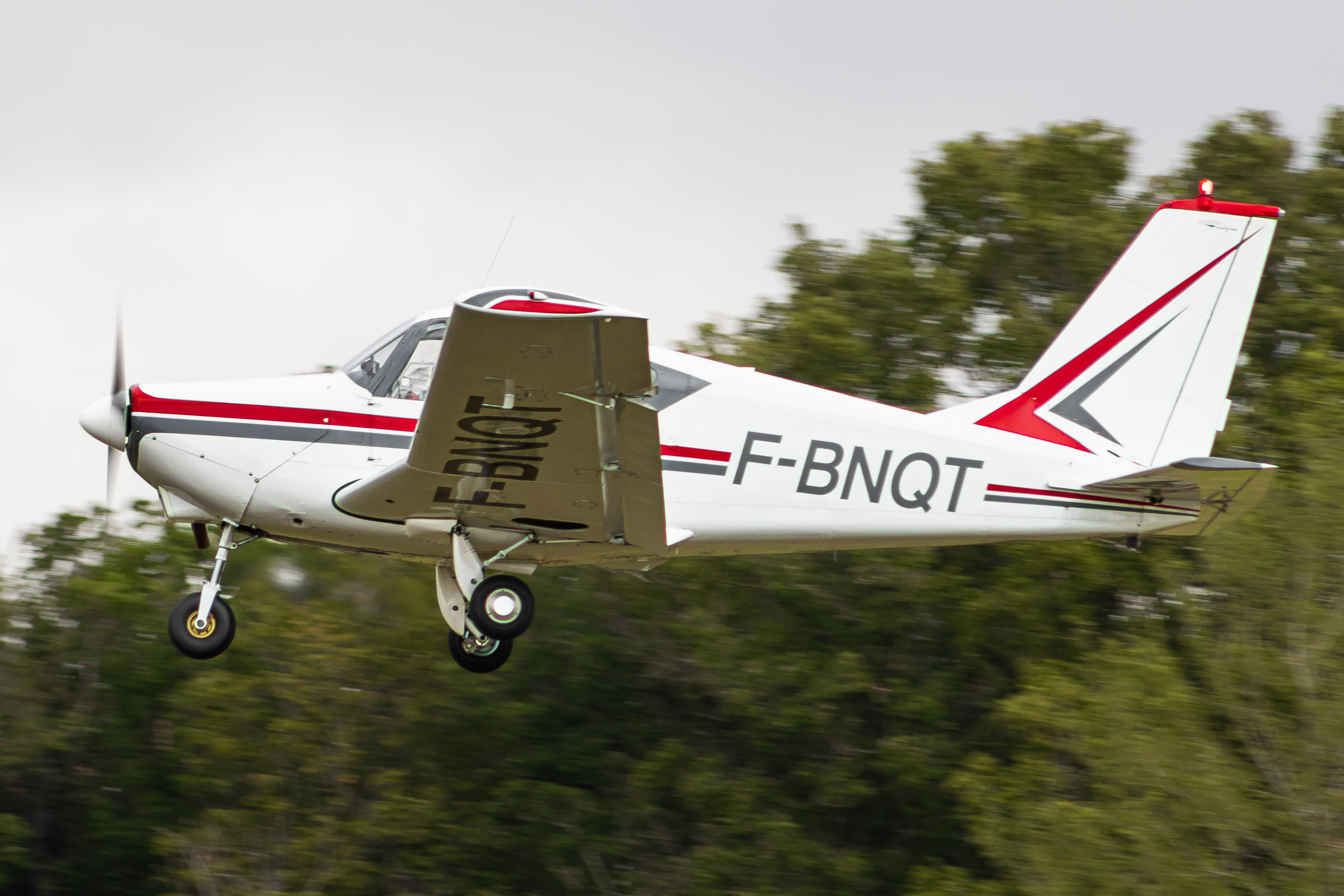
- A SOCATA Horizon taking off

General information
- Type: Four-seat light aircraft
- National origin: France
- Manufacturer: Sud Aviation; SOCATA
- Designer: Yves Gardan
- Number built: 273

History
- First flight: 21 July 1960
- Variant: SOCATA ST-10 Diplomate

The GY-80 Horizon is a French four-seat touring monoplane of the 1960s designed by Yves Gardan and built under licence, first by Sud Aviation, and later by that company's SOCATA subsidiary.

== Design and development ==
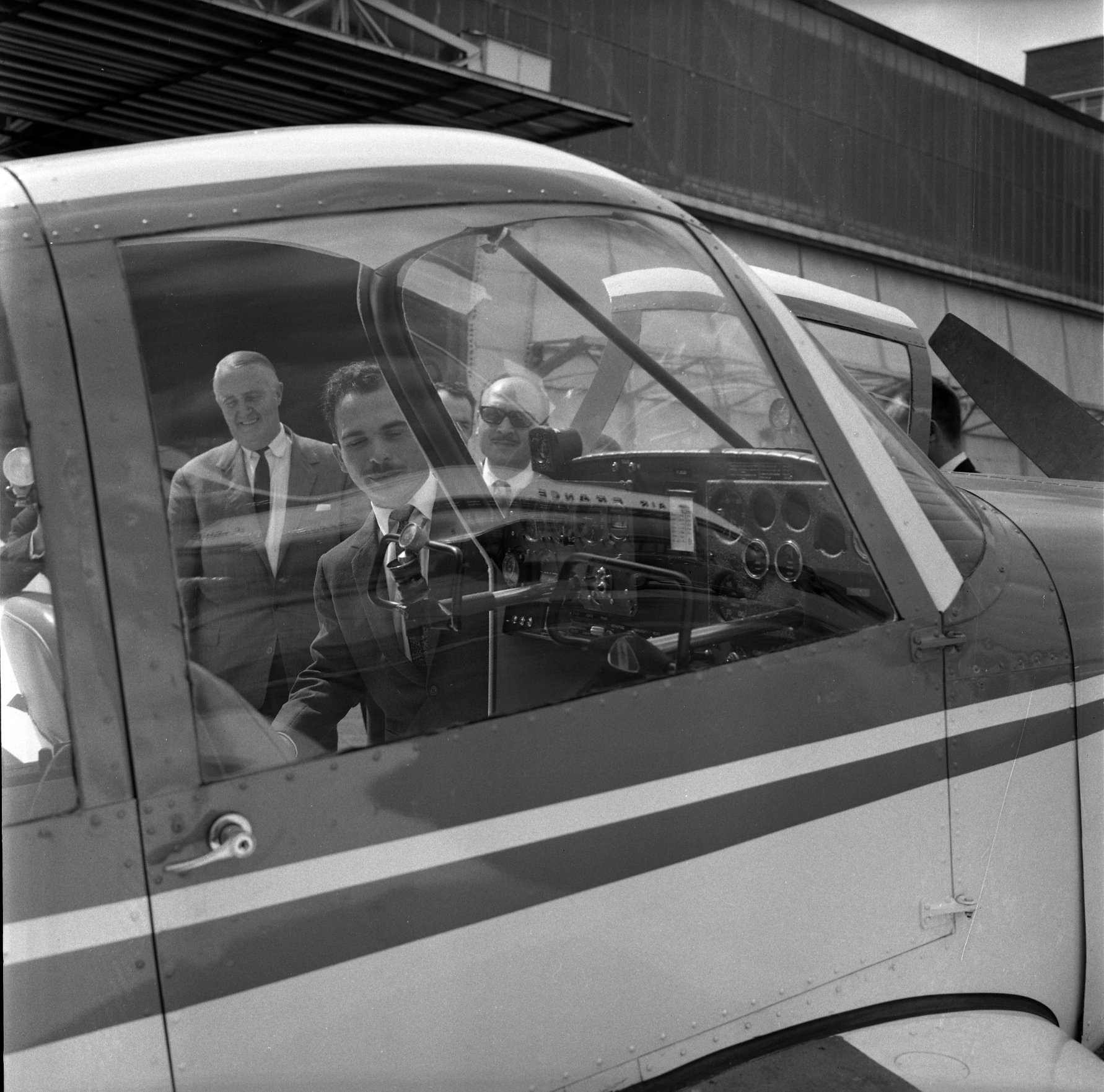
Presentation of the Horizon to King Hussein of Jordan in 1963

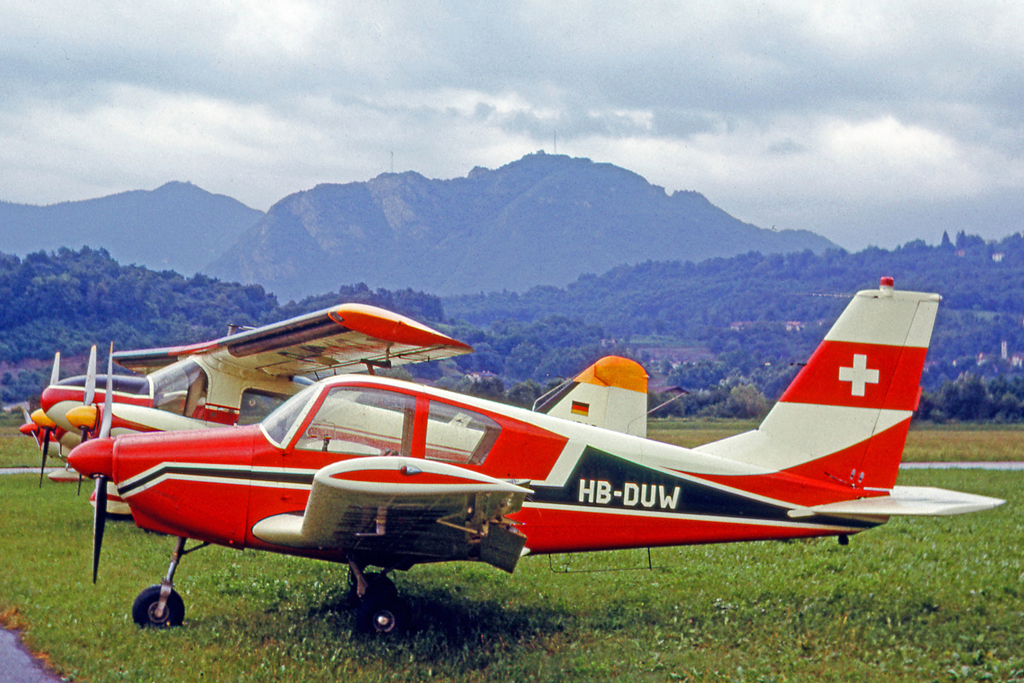
Early production Horizon in 1965 after export to Switzerland

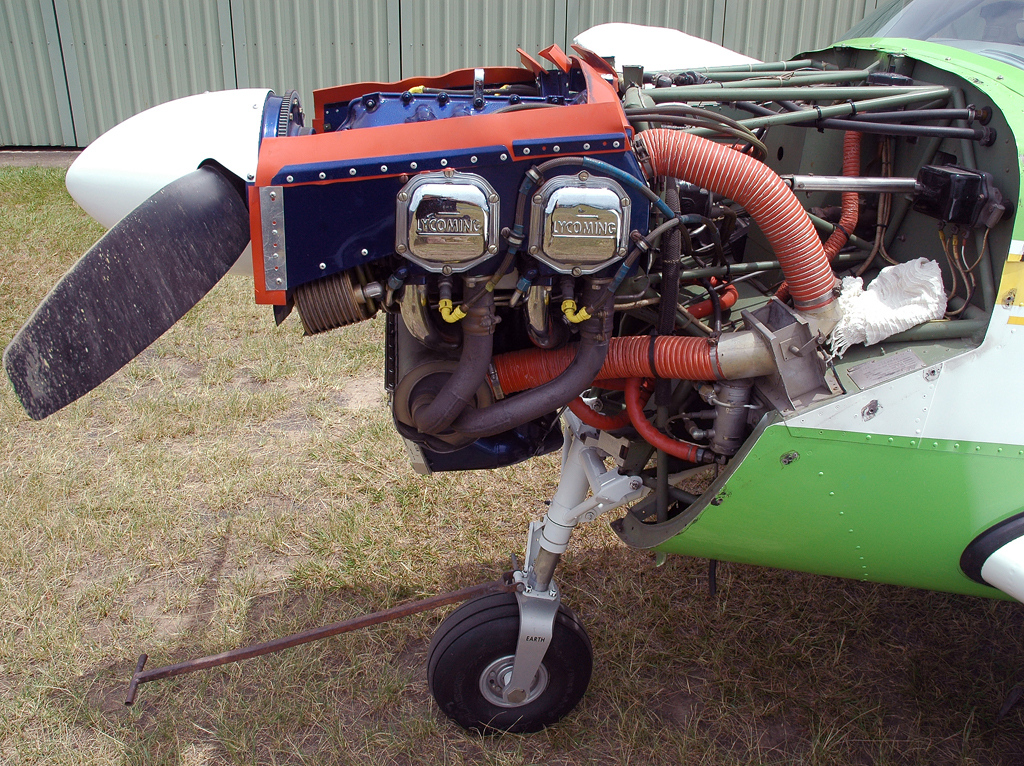
Lycoming O-320 engine of a GY-80-160D

The aircraft was designed by French designer Yves Gardan during the 1950s. In 1960, Sud Aviation acquired from Gardan a licence to build the design. The prototype first flew on 21 July 1960, and the aircraft was initially produced by Sud Aviation at Nantes and Rochefort. Sud Aviation later acquired the bankrupt Morane-Saulnier aircraft company, and in 1966 formed the subsidiary SOCATA to continue production of the Morane-Saulnier Rallye; however, Sud Aviation soon transferred production of its other general aviation aircraft to SOCATA as well. Sud Aviation and its SOCATA subsidiary manufactured 273 units by the end of 1974, when production was terminated.

The all-metal design has a low-mounted cantilever wing with four mechanically operated Fowler-type trailing-edge flaps and two Frise-type ailerons. The tricycle landing gear partially retracts, with all wheels retracting rearwards. The first prototype used a 150 hp (112 kW) Avco Lycoming O-320 flat air-cooled engine driving a fixed-pitch metal propeller, with production aircraft using this engine or a 160 hp (120 kW) version of the O-320, and had an option to use a constant speed propeller. By 1966, a 180 hp (130 kW) Lycoming O-360 engine was available, and the 150 hp option was removed by 1967.

Most Horizons were bought by French pilot owners, but examples were exported to several countries, including Germany, Switzerland and the United Kingdom, and numbers remained in service in 2014.

An improved variant was developed originally as the Super Horizon 200 and later went into production as the ST 10 Diplomate.

== Operators ==
Cambodia

- Royal Cambodian Air Force

Khmer Republic

- Khmer Air Force – former operator

== Specifications (GY-80-180 with constant-speed propeller) ==
Data from Jane's All the World's Aircraft 1969–70.

General characteristics

- Crew: 1
- Capacity: 3 passengers
- Length: 6.64 m (21 ft 9 in)
- Wingspan: 9.70 m (31 ft 10 in)
- Height: 2.60 m (8 ft 6 in)
- Wing area: 13.0 m^{2} (140 sq ft)
- Aspect ratio: 7.2:1
- Airfoil: NACA 4413.6 (mod) at root, NACA 63517 (mod) at tip
- Empty weight: 625 kg (1,378 lb)
- Max takeoff weight: 1,150 kg (2,535 lb)
- Fuel capacity: 160 L (35 imp gal; 42 US gal)
- Powerplant: 1 × Lycoming O-360-A flat-four piston engine, 130 kW (180 hp)

Performance

- Maximum speed: 250 km/h (160 mph, 130 kn) at sea level
- Cruise speed: 245 km/h (152 mph, 132 kn) at 2,500 m (8,200 ft) (75% power)
- Stall speed: 95 km/h (59 mph, 51 kn) flaps and undercarriage down
- Never exceed speed: 300 km/h (190 mph, 160 kn)
- Range: 1,250 km (780 mi, 670 nmi)
- Endurance: 5 hr 20 min
- Service ceiling: 4,700 m (15,400 ft)
- Rate of climb: 4.50 m/s (885 ft/min)
- Takeoff run from 15 m (50 ft): 480 m (1,575 ft)
- Landing run to 15 m (50 ft): 490 m (1,608 ft)

== See also ==
Related development

- SOCATA ST 10 Diplomate

Aircraft of comparable role, configuration, and era

- Ambrosini Rondone
- Beagle Pup
- Beechcraft Musketeer
- Piper Cherokee
- SOCATA Rallye
