= SOCATA TB family =

French general aviation aircraft family (made 1975–2012)

Socata TB series
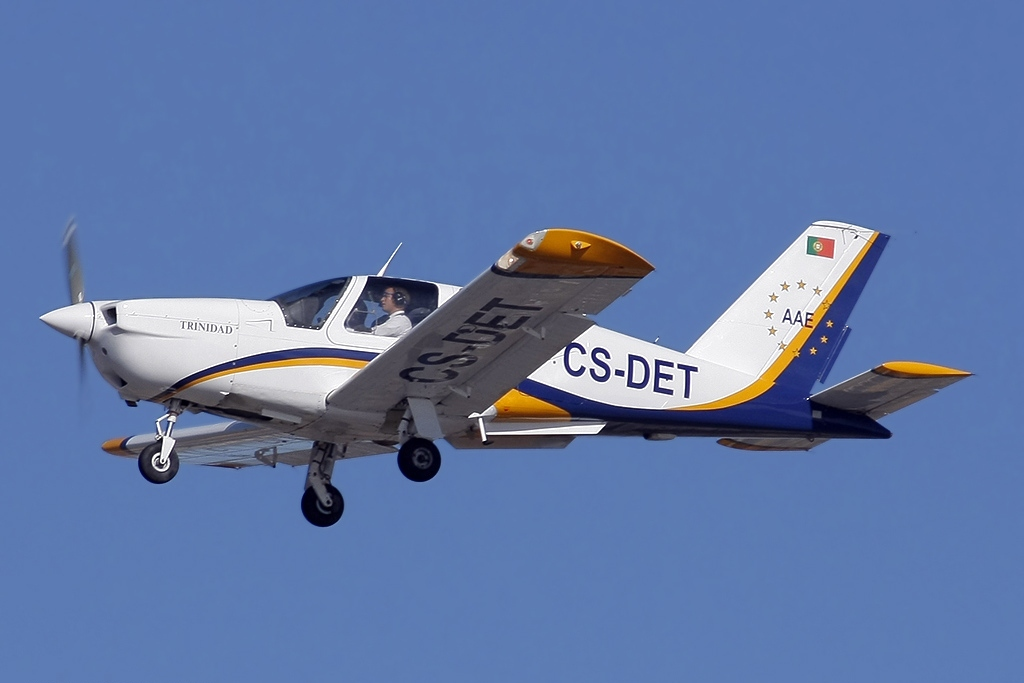
- TB20 Academia Aeronáutica de Évora

General information
- Type: Light single-engine piston aircraft
- Manufacturer: Socata
- Status: Out of production, in active service
- Number built: 2,150 (2007)

History
- Manufactured: 1975–2012
- Introduction date: 1975

The Socata TB is a series of light single-engine piston aircraft developed and manufactured by French aircraft company SOCATA. The letters TB within the designation stand for Tarbes, the French city where the aircraft series is manufactured. The TB series planes have come to be known as the "Caribbean Planes" due to the island naming convention adopted for the various models, though they are not often seen flown in that region.

All aircraft (with the exception of the TB9) have a constant-speed propeller. The TB series have become widely used in training and touring aircraft and are often used for instrument training. They are defined by their contemporary fit and finish as well as their interior size; compared to other four-seat single-engine aircraft, they are relatively roomy at roughly 49 inches (124 cm) at the shoulder. In part, this is due to the fuselage having a pronounced "round out" above the wing. Adding to the actual spaciousness, the side windows extend up well into the roof line, giving the Socata an airy feeling. Due to the larger fuselage and relatively heavy weights, TB series aircraft have lower performance figures than a similarly sized and powered but narrower aircraft, and the trade-off of speed for comfort is often cited by TB owners.

During the 2000s, sales of the TB family suffered as a consequence of a worldwide aviation recession, leading Socata to seek to restructure the marketing and production aspects of the program. Leading on from several cost-cutting measures, such as reorganisations of staff, negotiations with suppliers, and outsourcing, between 2004 and 2008, the company sought to transfer all production of the TB series out of France, selecting Romania to produce the type. However, sales of the type failed to recover, resulting in the end of series production in favor of built-to-order manufacturing instead and, eventually, the termination of all marketing and production activities by 2012. Support remains for existing customers, and new upgrades had been introduced for these aircraft, such as the option to retrofit glass cockpits.

== Development ==
=== Origins ===
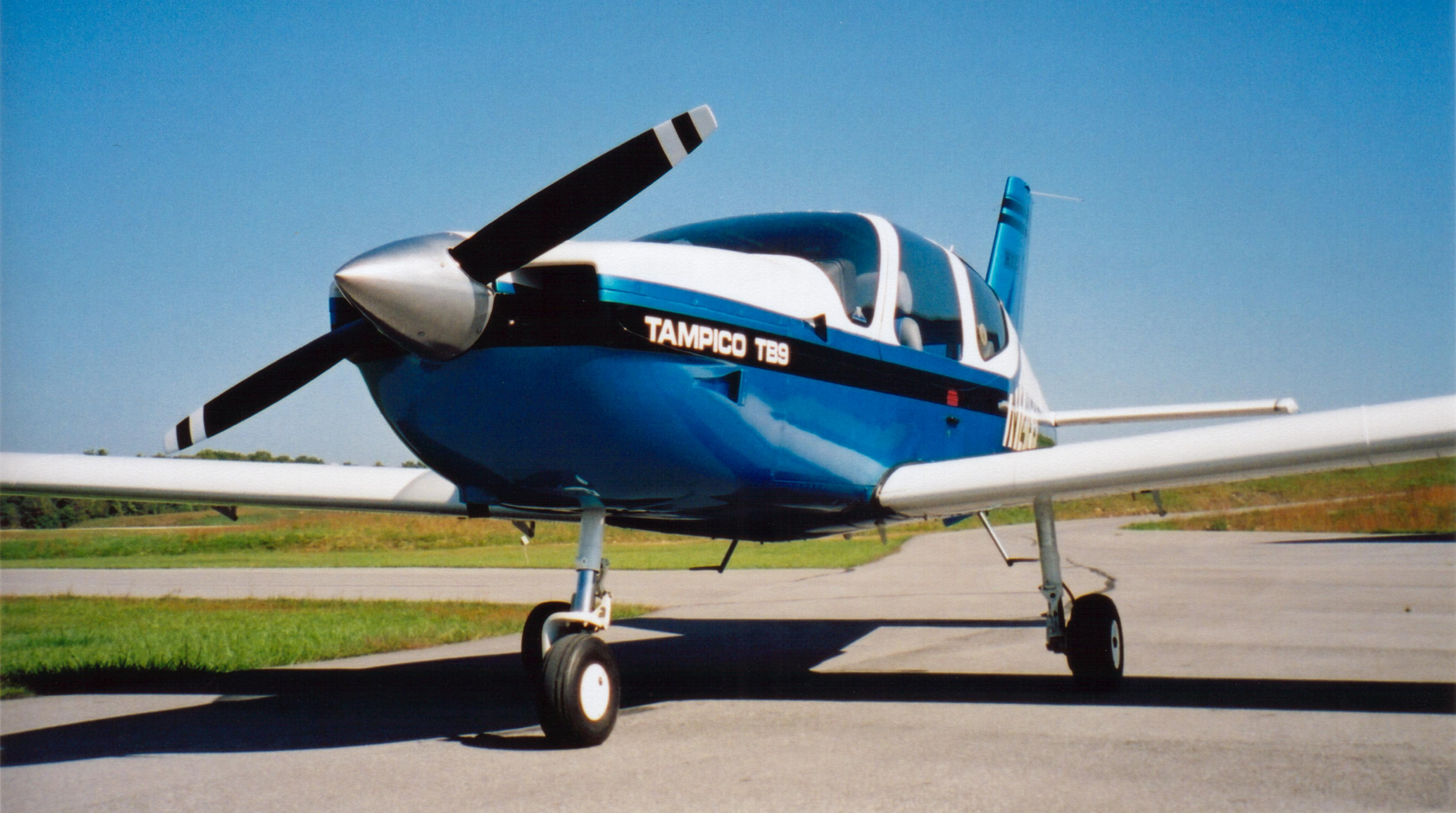
Socata TB9 Tampico

During the mid-1970s, French aircraft company SOCATA commenced design work on what would become the TB family of general aircraft; a key ambition of this new product line was to entirely replace the firm's existing and highly successful Rallye series of aircraft. The first prototype, powered by a 119 kW (160 hp) Avco Lycoming O-320 engine, flew on 23 September 1977 but was lost during spin testing on 15 December that year. A second prototype was fitted with a 134 kW (180 hp) engine. As intended, throughout 1979, production of the Rallye family began to draw down as production of the new family; In initial entry models of which were designated as the TB-9 Tampico and the TB-10 Tobago, with type certification by the French Directorate General for Civil Aviation on 26 April 1979. On 18 December 1980, an improved model of the aircraft, designated as the TB20, was awarded its type certification by the French aviation authorities. During March 1981, the first delivery of a production TB20 was completed to a German customer. Various improved models of the TB series were subsequently developed.

SOCATA adopted a straightforward assembly philosophy at its final assembly facility in Tarbes, choosing to only complete a given aircraft after having already received an order for it. Basic airframes would be produced in advance and finished upon order, allowing for customer-specified modifications and optional equipment to be installed as per their demands. While the type was completed upon a single assembly line at the facility, all models, low and top end alike, were finished upon the same line. At the start of 1993, SOCATA was manufacturing around 12 aircraft of the TB series per month, by the middle of the year, this had dipped to roughly 8 aircraft per month.

During the 1990s, an improved model of the TB family, designated as the TB20 Trinidad was developed. Around 2000, all aircraft in the TB series underwent modernisation; to reflect this upgrade, the letters GT (standing for Generation Two) were applied to applicable models. The GT versions feature an enlarged cabin and various aerodynamic improvements; the most noticeable differences between the first and second generation models are the redesigned wing tips, which are noticeably rounder upon the older models, and the shape of the vertical stabiliser, which is curved on the lower front on the GT models. The styling of the rear windows have also changed, being more blended with the fuselage on the GT models; an optional three-bladed Hartzell, which reduced cabin noise and increased ground clearance, was also made available. During February 2000, SOCATA officially launched its Generation Two range, having received a major US order for 79 aircraft from West Coast distributor New Avex.

=== Restructure and end of production ===
During the early 2000s, a major worldwide downturn in the aviation industry resulting from the 2001 9/11 terrorist attacks in the United States had severely impacted sales of the TB family. During 2003, the decision was made to suspend serial production of the type and substantial efforts were launched to establish new outsourcing arrangements, particularly focused upon companies within eastern European companies. By mid-2004, SOCATA expected to produce a maximum of 30 aircraft that year, substantially lower than the capacity available. In addition to cost-saving efforts, aimed at reducing costs by at least 30 per cent; a detailed study was also conducted into the future of the TB family, including an examination of a projected all-composite derivative of the existing aircraft. During March 2004, SOCATA transferred all of its sales and marketing operations from its office in Paris to its manufacturing site in Tarbes as a cost-saving measure.

During mid 2004, the company announced that it was considered available options for relocating portions of the manufacturing chain for the TB family abroad, the move was attributed to the associated savings in labour costs that such a move would result in. During June 2005, it was revealed that SOCATA was in the process of evaluating between two prospective new manufacturing locations in Canada and Romania, having ruled out an arrangement with EADS PZL Warszawa-Okęcie SA in Poland after the collapse of negotiations between the two parties. During 2007, it was announced that SOCATA was in the process of organising the transfer of the final assembly line of both the TB20 and TB21 models, together with a tentative model known mostly as the TB2X, to a new manufacturing site in Bacau, Romania, and operated by Aerostar as part of an industrial offset agreement. The TB2X was the working designation for a new model in the TB series; this aircraft would most likely have been similar to the TB20 Trinidad, except for being powered by a Diesel engine instead. As late as 2007, SOCATA were reporting that they anticipated a production rate of up to 100 aircraft per year to be attained at the new Bacau facility.

During 2006, it was alleged by a Dutch news site, that all production activity of the TB series would soon be terminated. At this point, while no such official announcement had been issued by the company, it was apparent that the order book for the TB family was vacant of any aircraft of the type at this time; the last three TB aircraft to have been ordered had already been delivered two years prior. During 2008, SOCATA announced that from that point onwards, the TB GT Series would be built to order only. By 2012, the TB GT series had disappeared as an order option altogether. However, the existing aircraft of the type have continued to be supported by the company; more recently, the option of retrofitting a Garmin-built glass cockpit has been made available to customers.

== Design ==
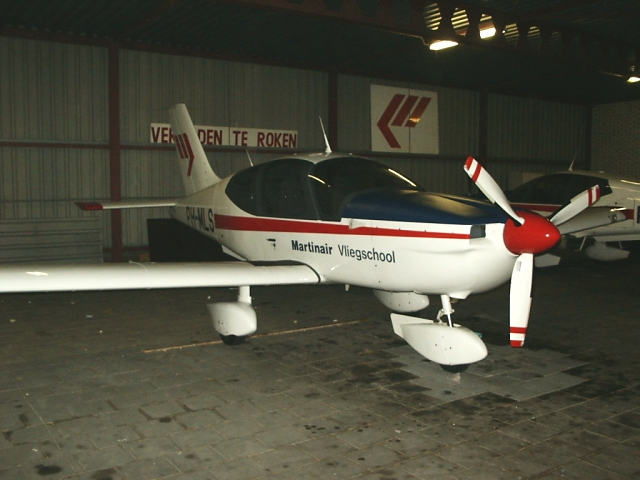
Socata TB10 Tobago GT owned by Martinair vliegschool (flying school)

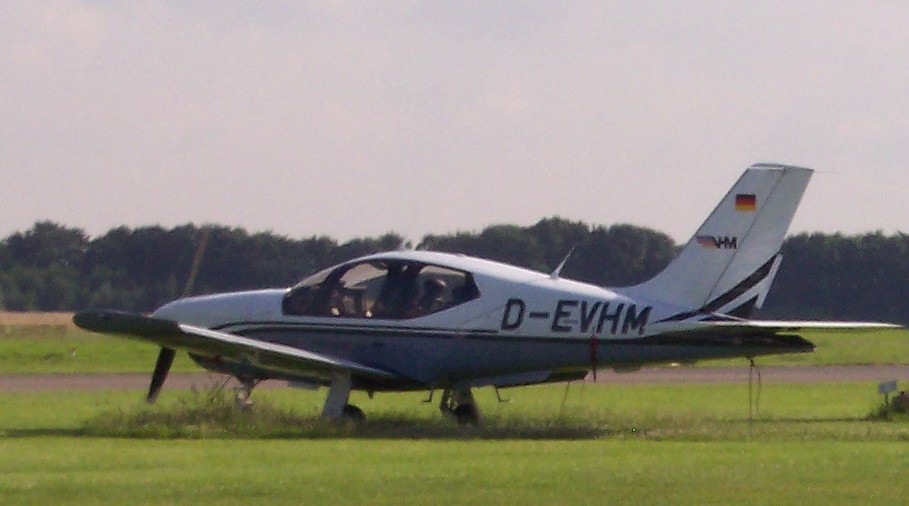
Socata TB20 Trinidad GT

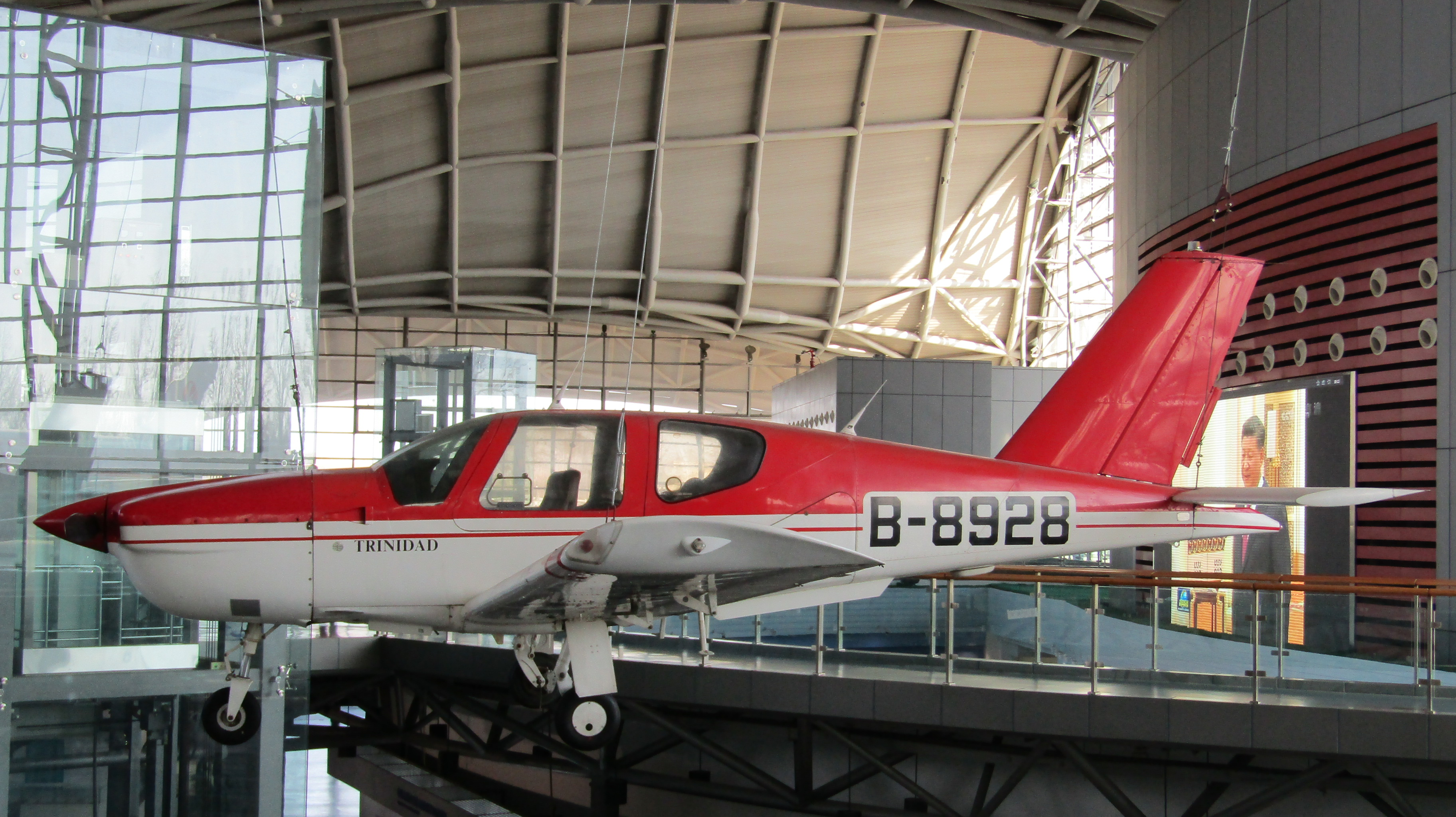
Socata TB-20 Trinidad

The SOCATA TB family is a series of single-engine light aircraft developed for general aviation and training purposes. Some versions, such as the TB-200 model, were specifically produced to meet the varied requirements of the trainer aircraft role. The type is often known for its favourable, easy to handle flight characteristics, such as its appropriate handling and control sensitivity, vice-free flying attitude, and being readily recoverable with ease from a typical stall, which lend themselves to less experienced pilots. Due to the absence of violent low-speed behaviour, the presence of a stall warning indicator is both necessary and furnished.

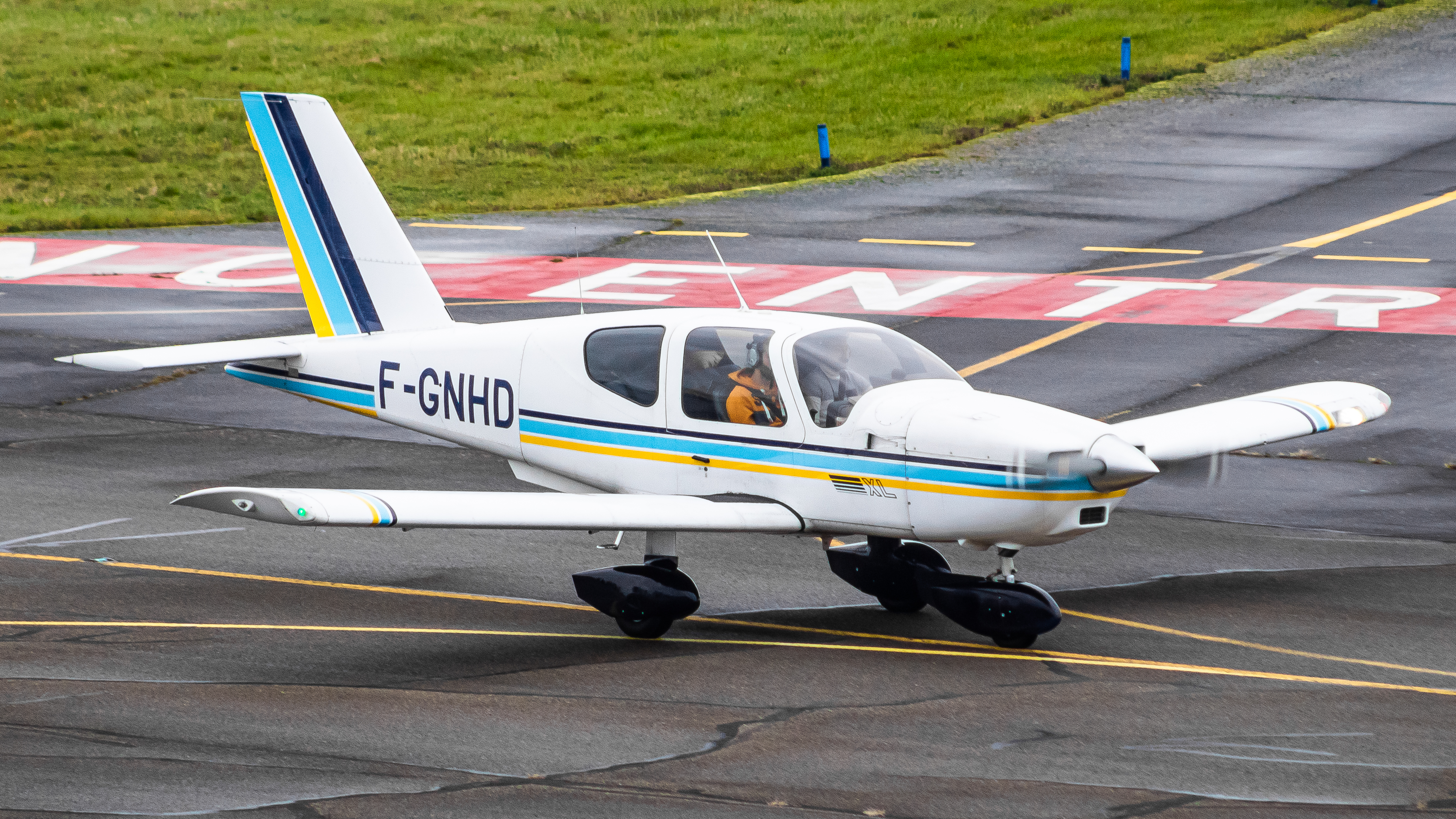
A Socata TB-200 Tobago XL

The design of the cabin incorporates a spacious and comfortable interior, intentionally reminiscent of luxury road vehicles. It can be accessed via either side of the aircraft; the door is intended to be left ajar while on the ground so that the cabin is better ventilated. A large canopy provides the pilots with a generous external view; elements of the cockpit instrumentation and controls, such as the annunciator panel, central pedestal, and individual elements like the nav/com and the circuit breakers, have been positioned to enable their easy overview as well. To aid in achieving fuel-efficiency, a simple fuel tank selection arrangement, augmented by digital gauges, is present upon most models.

The TB series all share the same basic fuselage and interior configuration. The primary differences between the models typically found in areas such as the landing gear, engine, and propeller.

- TB-9, TB-10, and TB-200 have fixed landing gear and optional landing gear fairings.
- TB-20 and TB-21 are fitted with retractable landing gear.
- TB-9 was offered with a 160 horsepower (119 kW) normally aspirated engine and either a two-bladed, fixed-pitch propeller or a two-bladed, constant speed propeller ("Tampico CS").
- TB-10 was offered with a 180 horsepower (134 kW) normally aspirated engine and a two-bladed, constant-speed propeller.
- TB-200 was offered with a 200 horsepower (149 kW) normally aspirated engine and two-bladed, constant-speed propeller.
- TB-20 was offered with a 250 horsepower (186 kW) normally aspirated engine, and either a two- or three-bladed constant speed propeller.
- TB-21 was offered with a 250 horsepower (186 kW) turbocharged engine and a three-bladed constant speed propeller.

== Operational history ==
The SOCATA TB family has been heavily used for general aviation purpose, for which it was originally designed. While typically operated by private individuals, it has been relatively popular with both civil and military training schools across various countries. According to aerospace publication Flight International, by around 1993, flight schools were accounting for the vast majority of orders for the type and that, by this point, 520 TB family aircraft had been sold to a total of 24 schools across the world.

The North American market proved to be of vital importance to the TB series; by 1993, SOCATA had received orders for in excess of 1,500 aircraft from various different customers within the region. Flight International attributed some of this success being due to product liability legislation having had a severe impact upon its American competitors, to which it was not affected by.

A major customer of the TB family has been the Civil Aviation Administration of China (CAAC), which deployed the type as a trainer aircraft. During the late 1980s, China was reportedly exploring the possibility of establishing its own independent production line to produce the TB-20 Trinidad model under licence. During December 1993, the CAAC confirmed its order with SOCATA for 43 aircraft, comprising 38 TB-200 Tobago XLs and 5 TB20 Trinidads; at this time, this was the largest ever single order to be received for the TB series.

== Variants ==
SOCATA TB-9 Tampico
Four-seat light cabin aircraft, powered by a 119 kilowatts (160 hp) Lycoming O-320-D2A piston engine, equipped with a fixed pitch propeller, fitted with fixed tricycle landing gear.
SOCATA TB-9 Tampico Club
Four-seat training version.
SOCATA TB-9C Tampico Club
SOCATA TB-9 Sprint
Fitted with a spatted undercarriage.
SOCATA TB-9 Sprint GT
Improved version of the TB-9 Sprint.
SOCATA TB-10 Tobago
Four or five-seat light cabin aircraft, powered by a 134 kilowatts (180 hp) Lycoming O-360-A1AD piston engine, equipped with a fixed spatted landing gear.
SOCATA SB-10 Tobago Privilege
Limited edition model.
SOCATA SB-10 GT
Improved version of the TB.10 Tobago
SOCATA TB-11
Powered by a 134 kW (180 hp) piston engine.
SOCATA TB-15
Proposed version. Not built.
SOCATA TB-16
Proposed version. Not built.
SOCATA TB-20 Trinidad
Four or five seat light cabin aircraft, powered by a 250 horsepower (186 kW) piston engine, fitted with retractable tricycle landing gear.
SOCATA TB-20 Trinidad Excellence
Limited edition model, fitted with enhanced avionics.
SOCATA TB-20 C Trinidad
Air ambulance and freight transport version.
SOCATA TB-20 GT
Improved version of the TB-20 Trinidad.
SOCATA TB-21 Trinidad
250 horsepower (186 kW)
SOCATA TB-21 Trinidad TC
Turbocharged variant with 250 hp (186 kW) Lycoming TIO-540 B1AD.
SOCATA TB-21 Trinidad GT
Improved version of the TB-21 Trinidad TC, fitted with a digitally-controlled turbocharger.
SOCATA TB-30 Epsilon
Military trainer aircraft unrelated to any of the other aircraft in the TB-series.
SOCATA TB-31 Omega
Proposed turboprop powered version of the TB-30 Epsilon. Only one aircraft built.
SOCATA TB-200 Tobago XL
Five-seat light cabin aircraft, powered by a 200 horsepower (149 kW) Lycoming IO-360A1B6 piston engine, fitted with fixed tricycle landing gear.
SOCATA TB-200 Tobago XL GT
Improved version of the TB-200 Tobago XL.
SOCATA TB-360 Tangara
An unrelated proposed aircraft based on the Gulfstream American GA-7 Cougar. Never entered production.

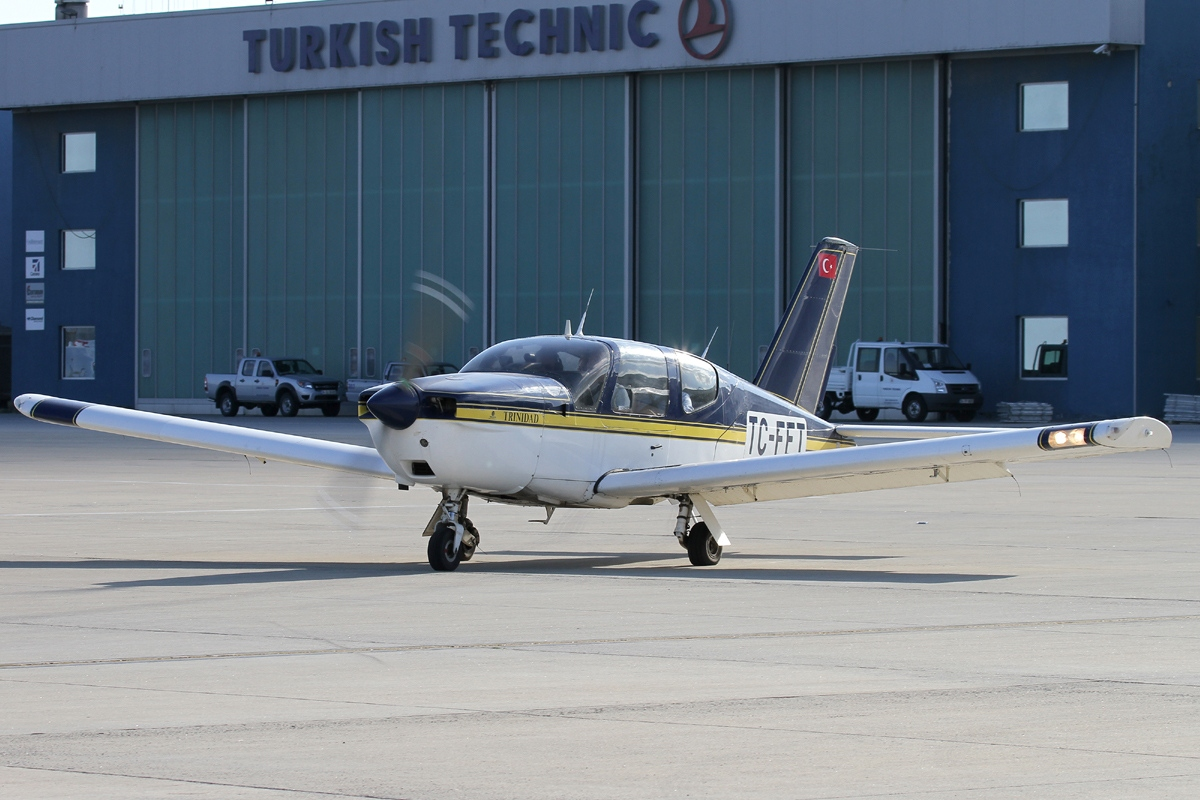
Socata TB-20 Trinidad Turkish Navy

== Operators ==
=== Military operators ===
France

- French Air Force

Greece

- Greek Coast Guard - received two TB-20s in 1988.

Indonesia

- Indonesian Navy - TB-9 and TB-10.

Israel

- Israeli Air Force

Jordan

- Royal Jordanian Air Force

Turkey

- Turkish Navy 7 TB-20

Iran

- Islamic Republic of Iran Air Force

=== Civil operators ===
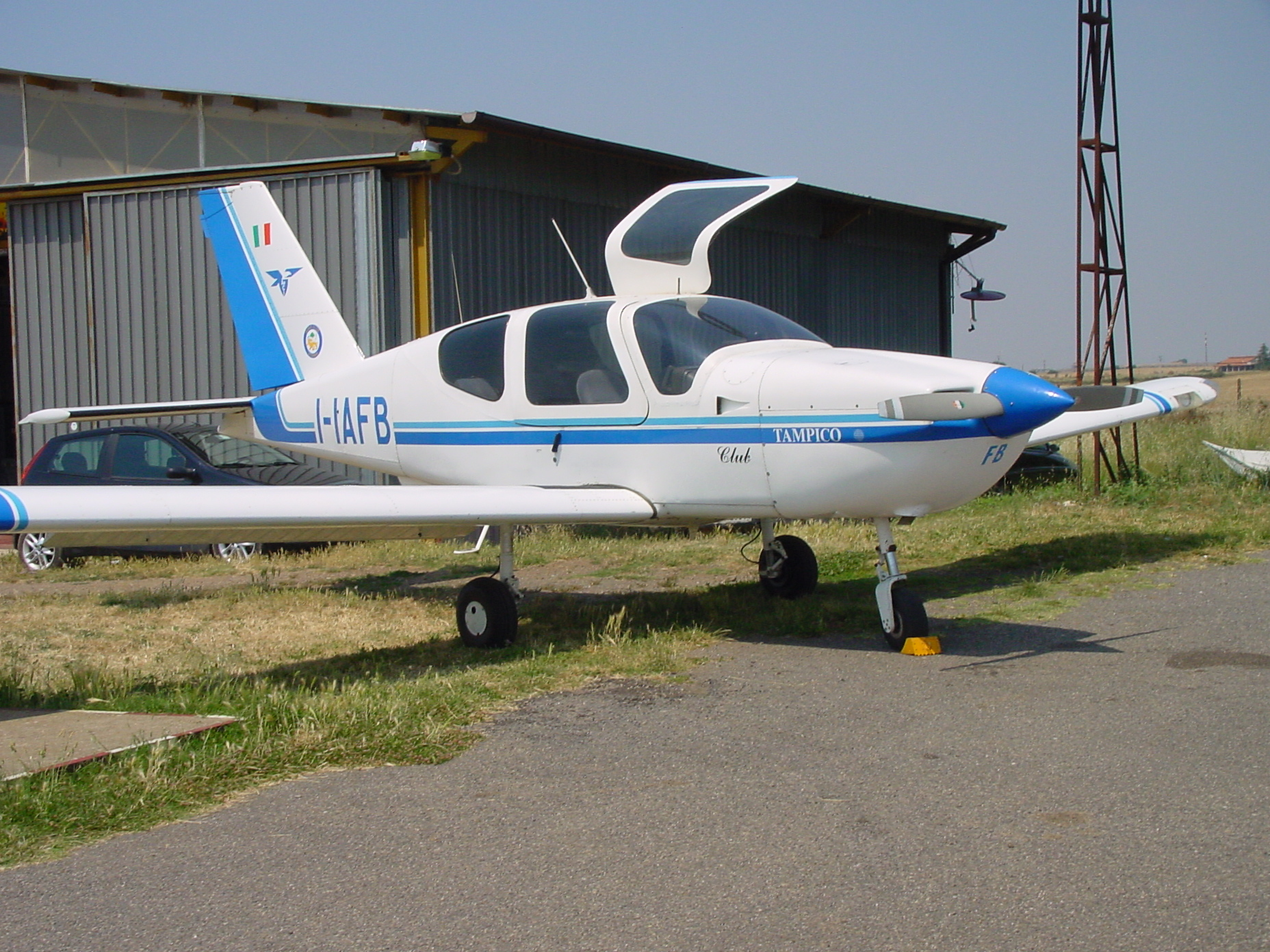
TB9 at Viterbo, Italy Air Club

France

- Directorate-General of Customs and Indirect Taxes - TB.20 Trinidad
- Ecole Nationale de l'Aviation Civile - 33 TB20 Trinidad and 10 TB20 GT

Indonesia

- Indonesian Civil Aviation Institute (ICAI)

Nigeria

Nigerian College of Aviation Technology

Philippines

- Philippine State College of Aeronautics (PHILSCA)

Poland

- Rzeszów University of Technology (Aviation Training Centre)

Italy

- Scuola di Volo Treviso

Australia

- TAFE South Australia - 19 TB10

Uruguay

- National Directorate of Civil Aviation and Aeronautical Infrastructure: Received 3 SOCATA TB-10 Tobago.

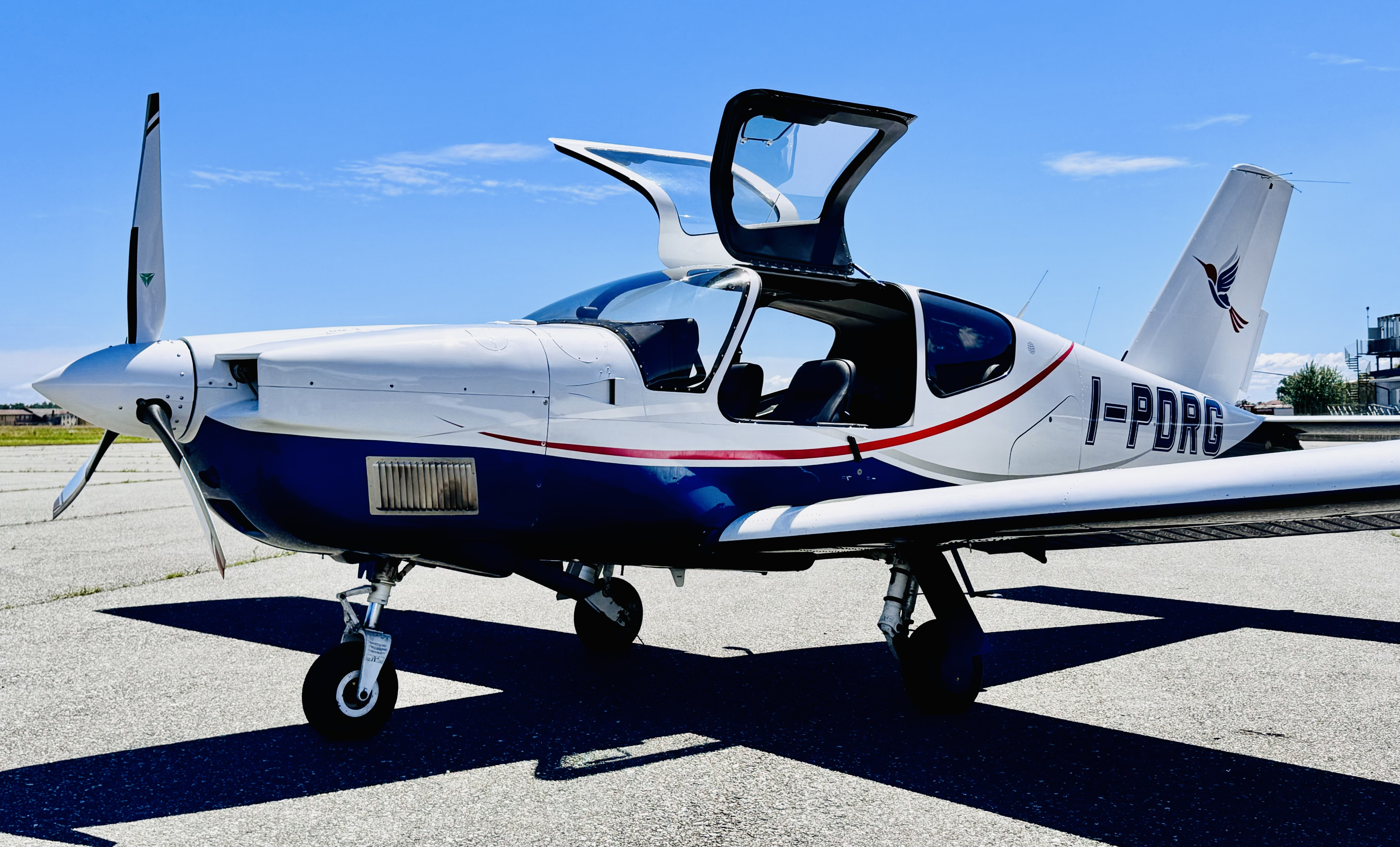
TB21 with 3 bladed propeller

== Specifications (TB 21 TRINIDAD TC) ==
Data from www.socata.org SOCATA TB user group and TB21 POH

General characteristics

- Crew: 1
- Capacity: 4 passengers
- Length: 7.75 m (25 ft 5 in)
- Wingspan: 9.85 m (32 ft 4 in)
- Height: 2.85 m (9 ft 4 in)
- Airfoil: RA 16 3C3
- Empty weight: 911 kg (2,008 lb) EFIS and MTV 9 propeller
- Max takeoff weight: 1,400 kg (3,086 lb)
- Fuel capacity: 336 Liters (88.8 U.S. Gallons)
- Powerplant: 1 × LYCOMING TIO-540-AB1AD Six-cylinder, horizontally opposed, direct drive, air-cooled and fitted with an automatically regulated turbocharger, 190 kW (250 hp)
- Propellers: 2-bladed Hartzell (option for 3 bladed MT-propeller)

Performance

- Cruise speed: 280 km/h (170 mph, 150 kn)
- Stall speed: 109 km/h (68 mph, 59 kn) Full flaps
- Never exceed speed: 350 km/h (217 mph, 189 kn)
- Range: 2,060 km (1,280 mi, 1,110 nmi) At 65% power at 25000 feet, with reserve
- Service ceiling: 7,600 m (25,000 ft)
- Rate of climb: 5.6 m/s (1,100 ft/min)

Avionics
Option for full EFIS

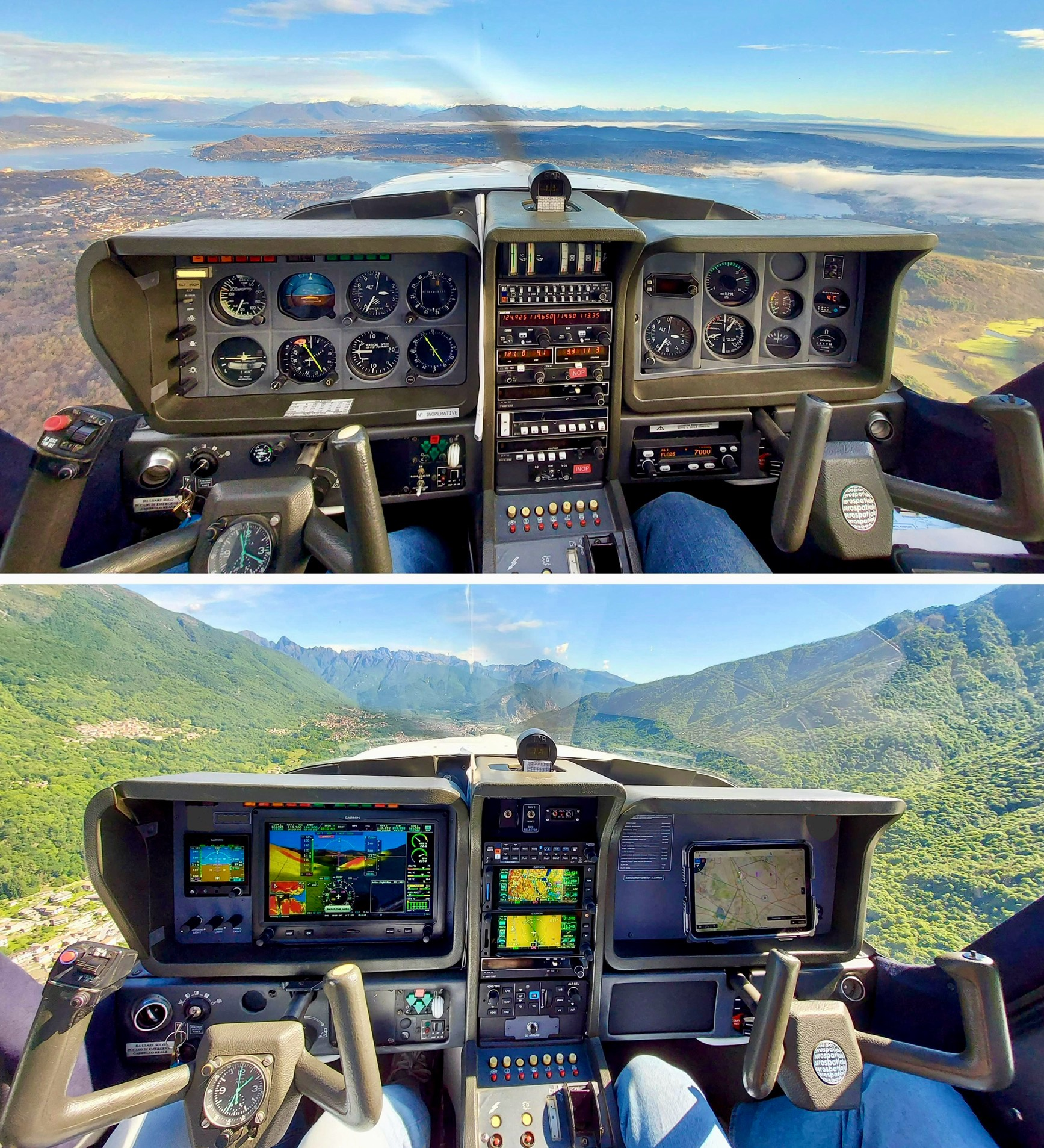
TB21 upgrade from "6 pack" to "EFIS"

== Specifications (TB 10) ==
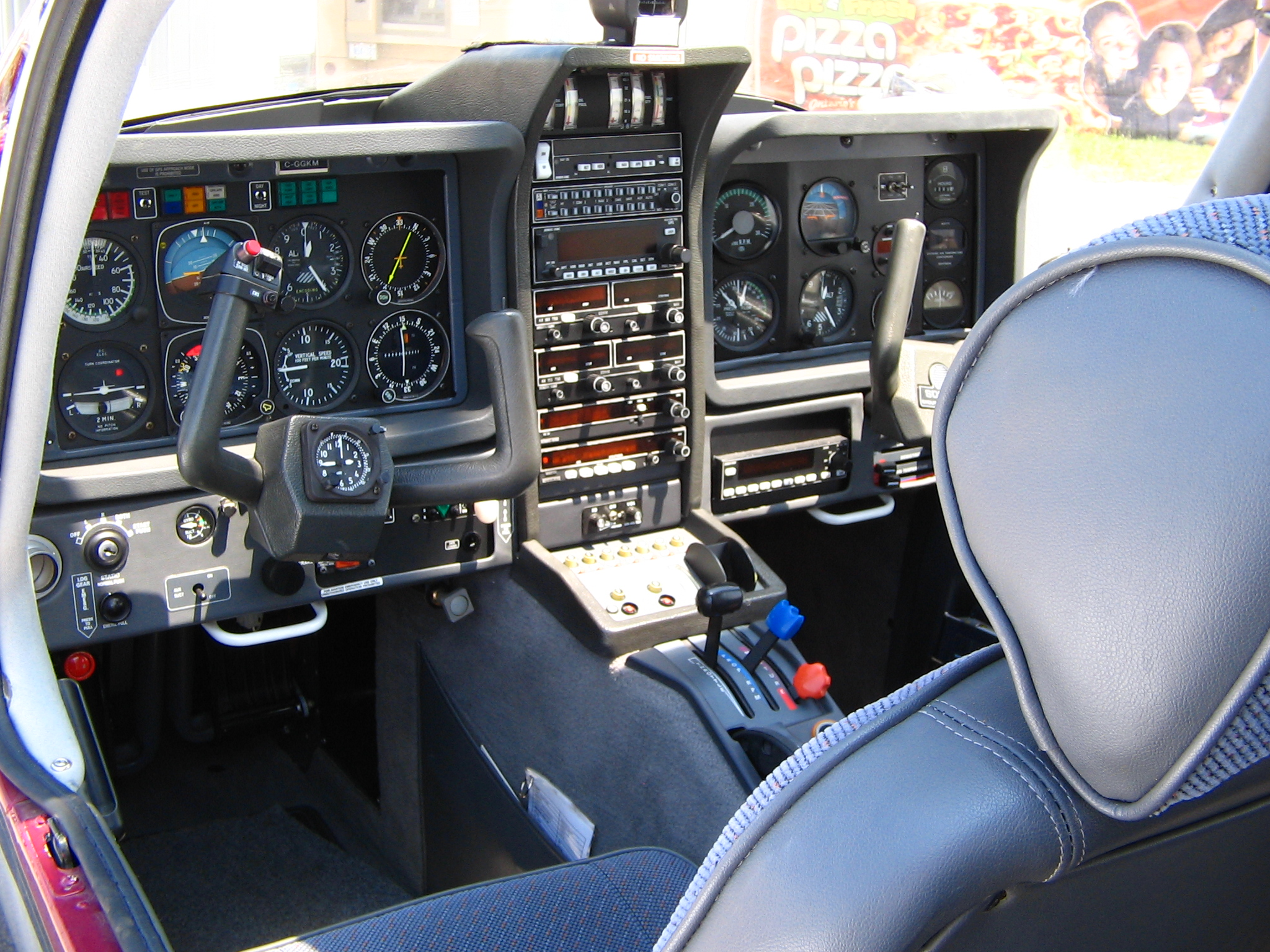
Cockpit view

Data from Jane's All The World's Aircraft 1982–83

General characteristics

- Crew: 1
- Capacity: 3-4
- Length: 7.63 m (25 ft 0 in)
- Wingspan: 9.76 m (32 ft 0 in)
- Height: 3.2 m (10 ft 6 in)
- Wing area: 11.9 m^{2} (128 sq ft)
- Airfoil: RA 16.3C3
- Empty weight: 670 kg (1,477 lb)
- Max takeoff weight: 1,150 kg (2,535 lb)
- Fuel capacity: 210 L (55 US gal; 46 imp gal) in two wing leading edge tanks; 7.5 L (2.0 US gal; 1.6 imp gal) Oil
- Powerplant: 1 × Lycoming O-360-A1AD 4-cylinder air-cooled horizontally-opposed piston engine, 134 kW (180 hp)
- Propellers: 2-bladed Hartzell constant-speed propeller, 1.88 m (6 ft 2 in) diameter

Performance

- Maximum speed: 247 km/h (153 mph, 133 kn)
- Cruise speed: 235 km/h (146 mph, 127 kn) max

217 km/h (135 mph; 117 kn) econ.

- Stall speed: 112 km/h (70 mph, 60 kn) flaps up

97 km/h (60 mph; 52 kn) flaps down

- Range: 1,210 km (750 mi, 650 nmi) max standard fuel t/o, climb, descent, 45 minutes reserve
- Service ceiling: 3,960 m (12,990 ft)
- Rate of climb: 4 m/s (790 ft/min) at sea level

Avionics
to customer specifications

== See also ==
- Socata TB 30 Epsilon
- Socata TB 360 Tangara

Related lists

- List of civil aircraft
