= SOCATA =

1966–2015 French general aviation aircraft manufacturer

- Native name: Société de construction d'avions de tourisme et d'affaires
- Formerly: SOCATA; EADS Socata; DAHER-SOCATA
- Company type: Private
- Industry: Aerospace
- Predecessor: Morane-Saulnier
- Founded: 1966
- Defunct: March 2015
- Fate: Absorbed into Daher
- Successor: Daher aircraft division
- Headquarters: Tarbes, France
- Products: Fixed-wing aircraft and aircraft structures
- Parent: Sud Aviation; Aérospatiale; EADS; Daher
- Website: https://www.daher.com/en/aircraft-manufacturer/

SOCATA (later EADS Socata and DAHER-SOCATA) was a French producer of general aviation aircraft propelled by piston engines and turboprops, including business planes, small personal or training aircraft, as well as the production of aircraft structures for other manufacturers such as Airbus, Dassault, Embraer, Eurocopter and Lockheed Martin. The company had its headquarters, along with much of its production capabilities, located in Tarbes, France.

During 1966, the French aircraft manufacturer Morane-Saulnier changed its name to SOCATA (which is an abbreviation for Société de Construction d'Avions de Tourisme et d'Affaires, French for "Company for the construction of aircraft for tourism and business") following its acquisition by Sud Aviation. During 2000, SOCATA became a wholly owned subsidiary of the multinational aerospace conglomerate EADS; shortly thereafter, the business was rebranded as EADS SOCATA. On 3 November 2008, EADS and French technology business DAHER announced that they had reached a final agreement for DAHER to acquire a 70% stake in EADS SOCATA. In June 2014, DAHER announced that it had acquired the remaining 30% of EADS SOCATA from Airbus Group (formerly EADS). During March 2015, the SOCATA name fell out of use, the company's name having been changed to just Daher at this time as part of a rebranding to align the division with its parent company.

== History ==
The history of SOCATA can be traced back to the founding of the French aircraft manufacturer Morane-Saulnier in 1911. During 1966, Morane-Saulnier changed its name to SOCATA (which is an abbreviation for Societe de Construction d'Avions de Tourisme et d'Affaires, French for "Company for the construction of aircraft for tourism and business") following the company's acquisition by the state-owned aerospace interest Sud Aviation. During this period of ownership, SOCATA focused its activities on general aviation, manufacturing thousands of light aircraft throughout the latter half of the 20th century.

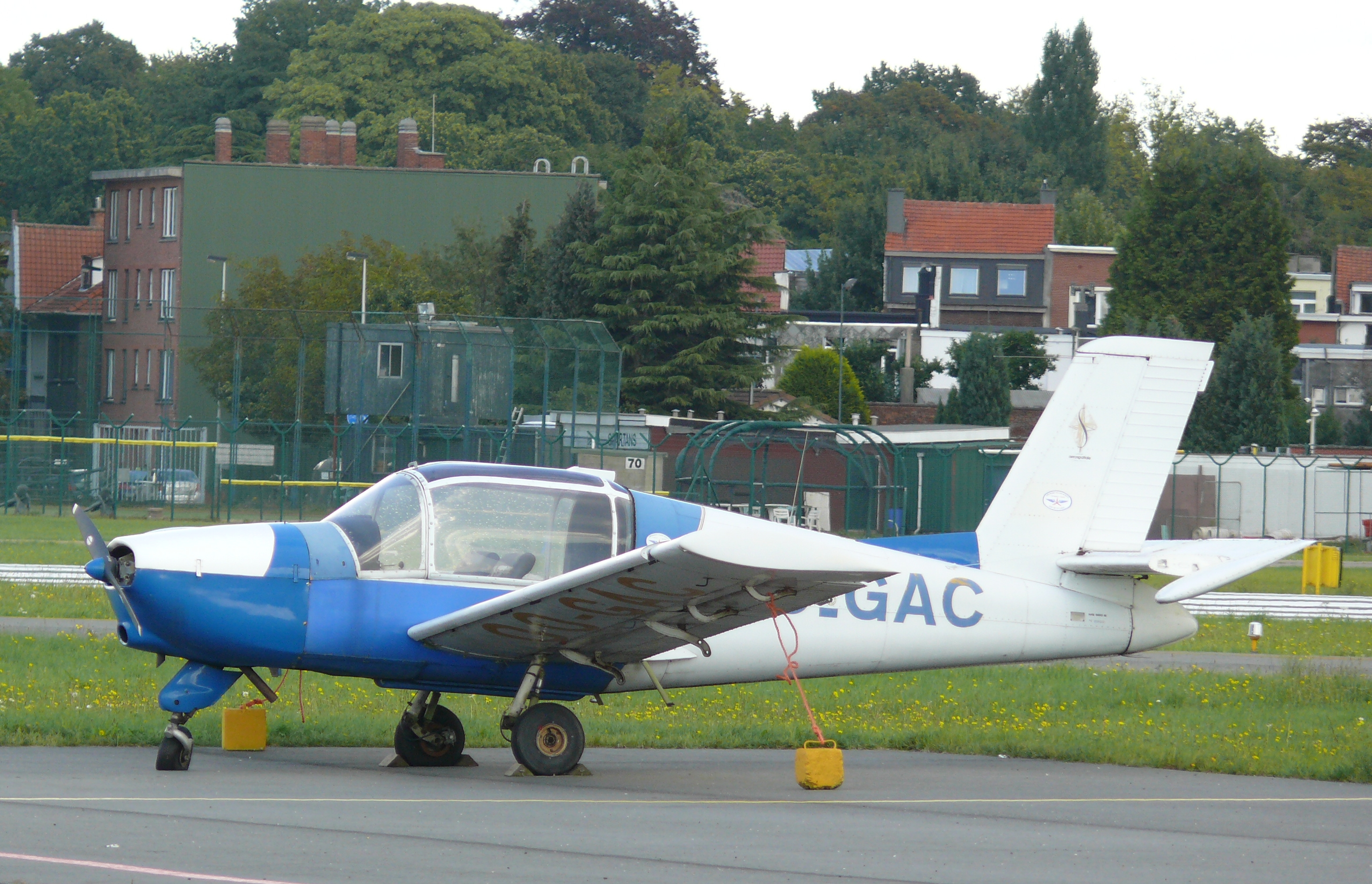
A SOCATA Rallye Club

One of the company's more popular products was the Rallye family of general aircraft. During 1979, SOCATA decided to reorganise and rebrand much of its production programmes, one of the results of which being the renaming of the various models of Rallye series, each one receiving an individual, "more Gallic" name. During the 1980s, the Rallye was gradually superseded and phased out of production in France by the newer Socata TB series. During December 1984, the final Rallye of approximately 3,300 aircraft, an armed R235 Guerrier model, was delivered. However, SOCATA's decision to terminate production in France was not the end of all manufacturing activity. During the 1970s, SOCATA had sold a license for the production of the Rallye 100ST model to the Polish State aviation company PZL, which led to the aircraft being independently constructed in its facilities in Warsaw as the PZL Koliber (Humming Bird). On 18 April 1978, the first PZL-built aircraft performed its maiden flight and, during the following year, quantity production of the Koliber commenced.

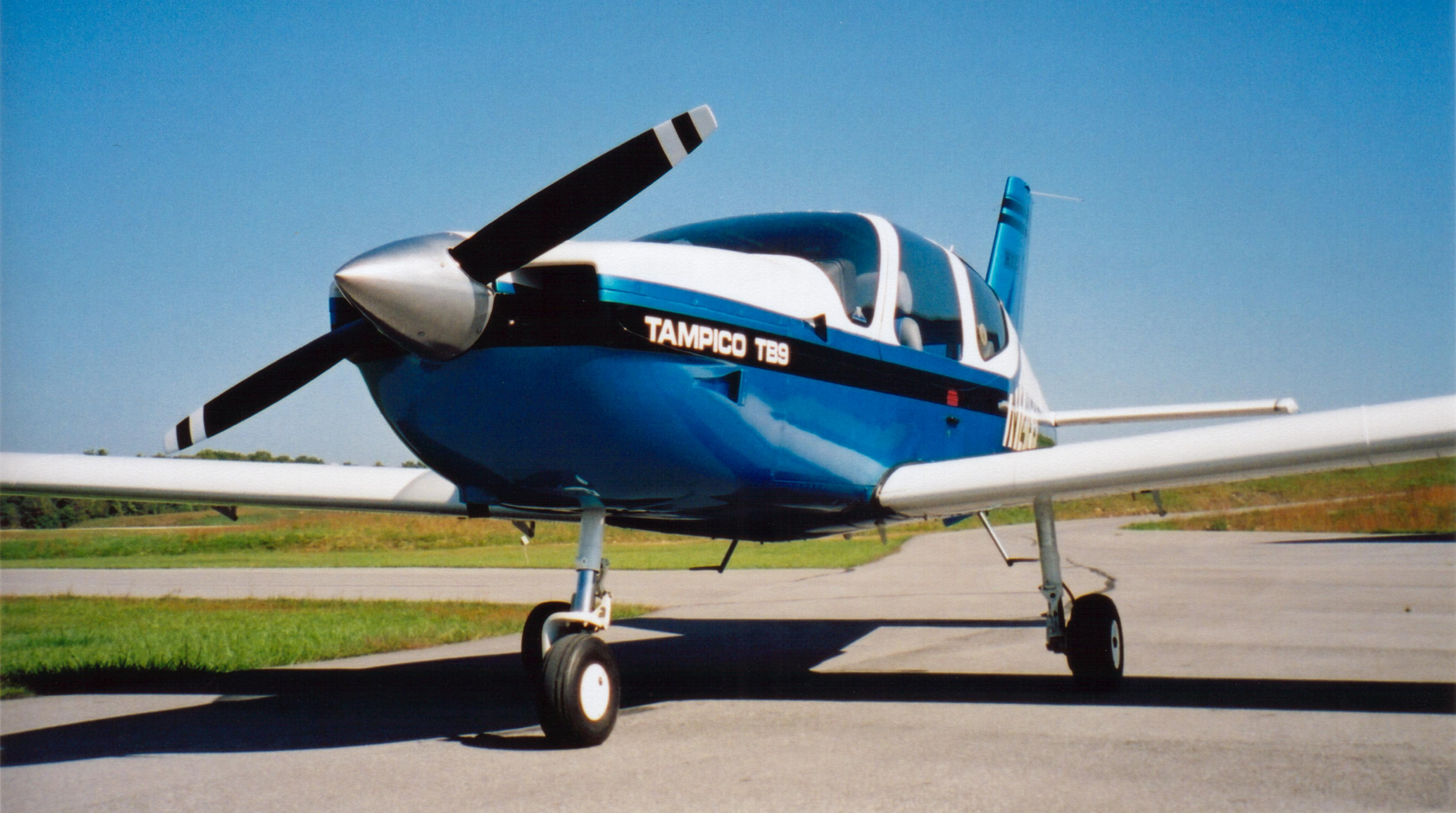
Socata TB9 Tampico

During the mid-1970s, SOCATA commenced work on what would become the TB family of general aircraft; a key ambition of this new product line was to entirely replace the firm's existing and highly successful Rallye series. As intended, throughout 1979, production of the Rallye family was drawn down as production of the new family ramped up; the initial entry models of which were designated as the TB-9 Tampico and the TB-10 Tobago. On 18 December 1980, an improved model of the aircraft, designated as the TB20, was awarded its type certification by the French aviation authorities. During March 1981, the first delivery of a production TB20 was completed to a German customer. Various improved models of the TB series were subsequently developed.

SOCATA adopted a straightforward assembly philosophy at its final assembly facility in Tarbes, choosing to only complete a given aircraft after having already received an order for it. Basic airframes would be produced in advance and finished upon order, allowing for customer-specified modifications and optional equipment to be installed as per their demands. While the type was completed upon a single assembly line at the facility, all models, low and top end alike, were finished upon the same line. At the start of 1993, SOCATA was manufacturing around 12 aircraft of the TB series per month, by the middle of the year, this had dipped to roughly 8 aircraft per month.

During the 1980s, SOCATA, having identified a vacant market position for a purpose-built optimised single-engine aircraft capable of fast personal transport and light cargo duties, became interested in the piston-powered Mooney 301 light aircraft of the Mooney Airplane Company. Accordingly, talks commenced between Mooney and SOCATA on the subject of producing a turboprop-powered derivative of the 301. The product that emerged from these discussions was a new design, referred to as the TBM 700, which was considerably heavier than the original 301 while provisioned with more than twice the available power. The prefix of the designation, TBM, originated from the initials "TB", which stands for Tarbes, the French city in which SOCATA is located, while the "M" stands for Mooney. At the time of its conception, while several aviation companies had studied or were otherwise considering the development of such an aircraft, the envisioned TBM 700 was the first high-performance single-engine passenger/cargo aircraft to enter production. From the onset, key performance criteria were established, demanding a high level of reliability while also being capable of an unequalled speed/altitude combination amongst the TBM 700 other single-engined peers.

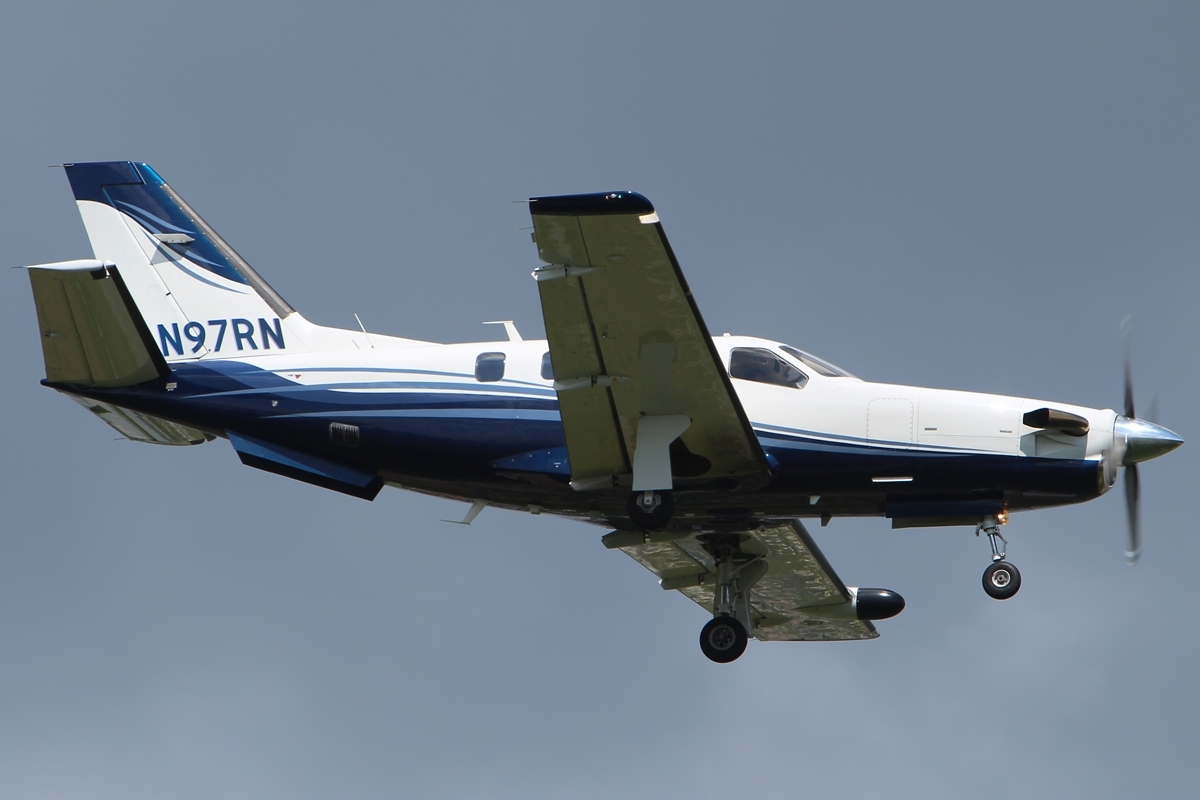
A TBM 700

Consequently, during June 1987, a joint venture, named TBM International, was established with the aim of completing development of the TBM 700 design and to perform the manufacture of the new aircraft; the ownership of the joint venture was divided between Mooney and SOCATA's then parent company, Aérospatiale. A pair of separate production lines for the TBM 700 were planned, one located at Mooney's facility in Kerrville, Texas, which was intended to cater to the American market, and the other based at SOCATA's factory in Tarbes, which was set to produce aircraft for customers throughout the rest of the world. However, during the late 1980s and early 1990s, Mooney was afflicted by persistent fiscal shortfalls; consequently, in May 1991, Mooney chose to withdraw from participation in the joint venture, leaving SOCATA as the primary company involved in the programme.

On 14 July 1988, the first TBM 700 prototype conducted the type's maiden flight. Flight testing proved that virtually all of the established goals of the design had been achieved, leading to quick progress towards production. On 31 January 1990, type certification was received from French authorities; it was followed by the awarding of US Federal Aviation Administration (FAA) certification on 28 August 1990. During early 1990, the first delivery of a TBM 700 occurred; the first production batch of 50 aircraft were sold out almost instantly. Early feedback received from operators and pilots was typically positive about the capabilities of the new aircraft, often praising its speed and generous power margins amongst other attributes. According to aerospace publication Flying, while the TBM 700 had rapidly proved popular and a good aircraft on its own merits, the services and support facilities SOCATA provided were an initial point of weakness. SOCATA, recognising the critical importance of an effective support infrastructure, invested heavily in improving worldwide support for the type; instead of being solely reliant upon third parties and partnership arrangements with other companies, the firm developed their own facilities. SOCATA opened its own service center in Florida, as well as establishing a network of distributors capable of both sales and services for the TBM 700. Consequently, during the late 1990s, sales of the type within the North American market rose dramatically.

During 2000, SOCATA became a wholly owned subsidiary of the multinational aerospace conglomerate EADS; shortly thereafter, the business was rebranded as EADS SOCATA. On 27 June 2008, EADS announced its intention to sell a controlling interest in EADS SOCATA to French technology business DAHER, but would retain a minority stake in the company. On 3 November 2008, EADS and DAHER announced that they had reached a final agreement for DAHER to acquire a 70% stake in EADS SOCATA. On 7 January 2009, DAHER confirmed its acquisition of a majority 70% stake in SOCATA.

During late 2009, it was announced that EADS SOCATA had finalised an agreement with a private company, JetSet International Ltd, for the sale of the type certificate, tooling, components, engineering plans and drawings for the Morane-Saulnier MS.760 Paris, a jet-powered business jet developed by SOCATA's predecessor. The firm had separately purchased in excess of 30 retired MS760s from the French and Argentinian governments; JetSet International Ltd reportedly had ambitions to refurbish these existing airframes and to install current-generation jet engines and avionics for the purpose of selling them on to operators for approximately $550,000.

In June 2014, Daher announced that it had acquired the remaining 30% of EADS SOCATA from Airbus Group (formerly EADS), making it a wholly owned subsidiary of the company. During March 2015, use of the SOCATA name was formally discontinued, the division having been rebranded as just Daher to more closely align itself with its new parent company.

== Products ==
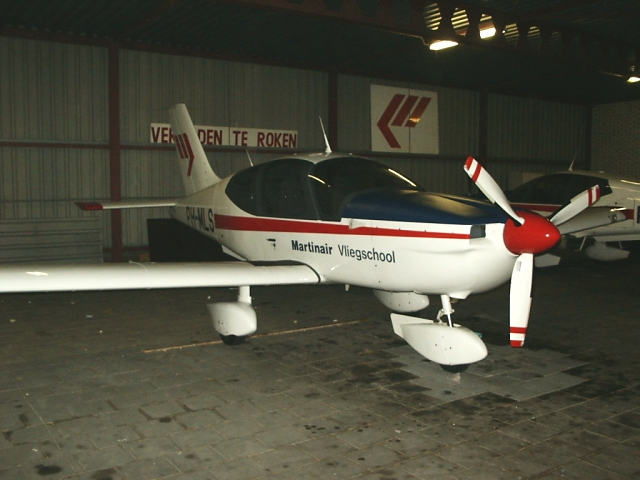
EADS Socata TB 10 Tobago GT owned by Martinair flying school

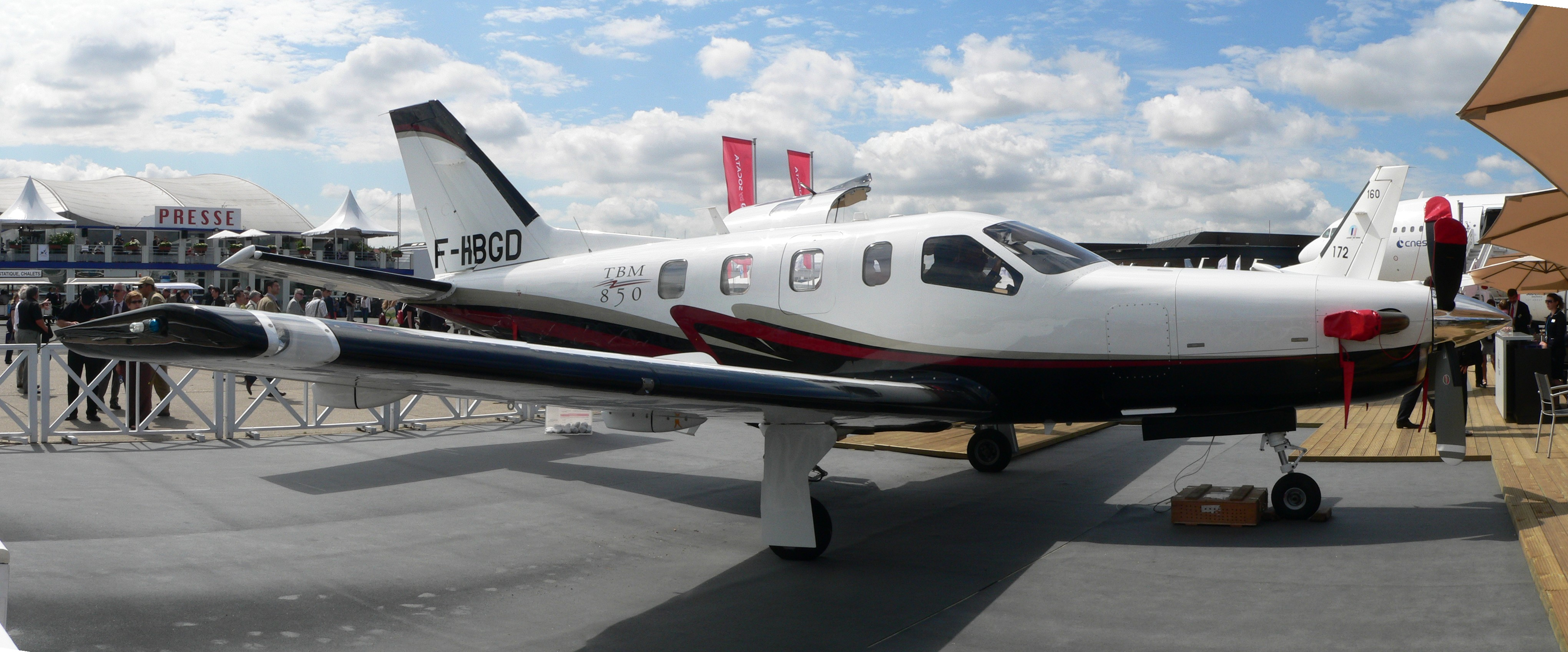
EADS Socata TBM 850 at the Paris Air Show 2007

- Socata Horizon
- Rallye series
- ST 10 Diplomate
- TB 30 Epsilon
- TB 9 Tampico GT
- TB 10 Tobago GT
- TB 200 Tobago XL GT
- TB 20 Trinidad GT
- TB 21 Trinidad TC GT
- TBM 700/850/900/910/930

Aircraft that never entered production

- TB 31 Omega
- TB 360 Tangara
