= Franklin O-235 =

American aircraft engine

O-235/4A-235/Sport 4
- Type: Piston aircraft engine
- National origin: United States
- Manufacturer: Franklin Engine Company/WSK-PZL
- First run: 1964

The Franklin O-235 (company designation 4A-235 and Sport 4) is an American air-cooled aircraft engine that first ran in the mid-1960s. The engine is of four-cylinder, horizontally-opposed layout and displaced 235 cu in (4 L). The power output is nominally 125 hp (93 kW).

== Variants ==
4A-235
130 hp (97 kW) at 2,800 rpm

Sport 4
125 hp (93 kW) at 2,800 rpm

== Applications ==
- Duruble Edelweiss
- Hollman Sportster
- MacFam Cavalier
- Practavia Sprite
- PZL-110 Koliber
- Rallye-Club
- Skystar Kitfox
- Stewart Foo Fighter

== Specifications (4A4-235) ==
Data from

=== General characteristics ===
- Type: 4-cylinder air-cooled horizontally opposed aircraft piston engine
- Bore: 4.625 in (117.5 mm)
- Stroke: 3.5 in (88.9 mm)
- Displacement: 235.2 in³ (3.85 L)
- Dry weight: 223 lb (101 kg)

=== Components ===
- Cooling system: Air-cooled

=== Performance ===
- Power output: 130 hp (75 kW) at 2,800 rpm

== See also ==
Comparable engines

- Lycoming O-235

Related lists

- List of aircraft engines
