= SOCATA ST 10 =

ST 10 Diplomate
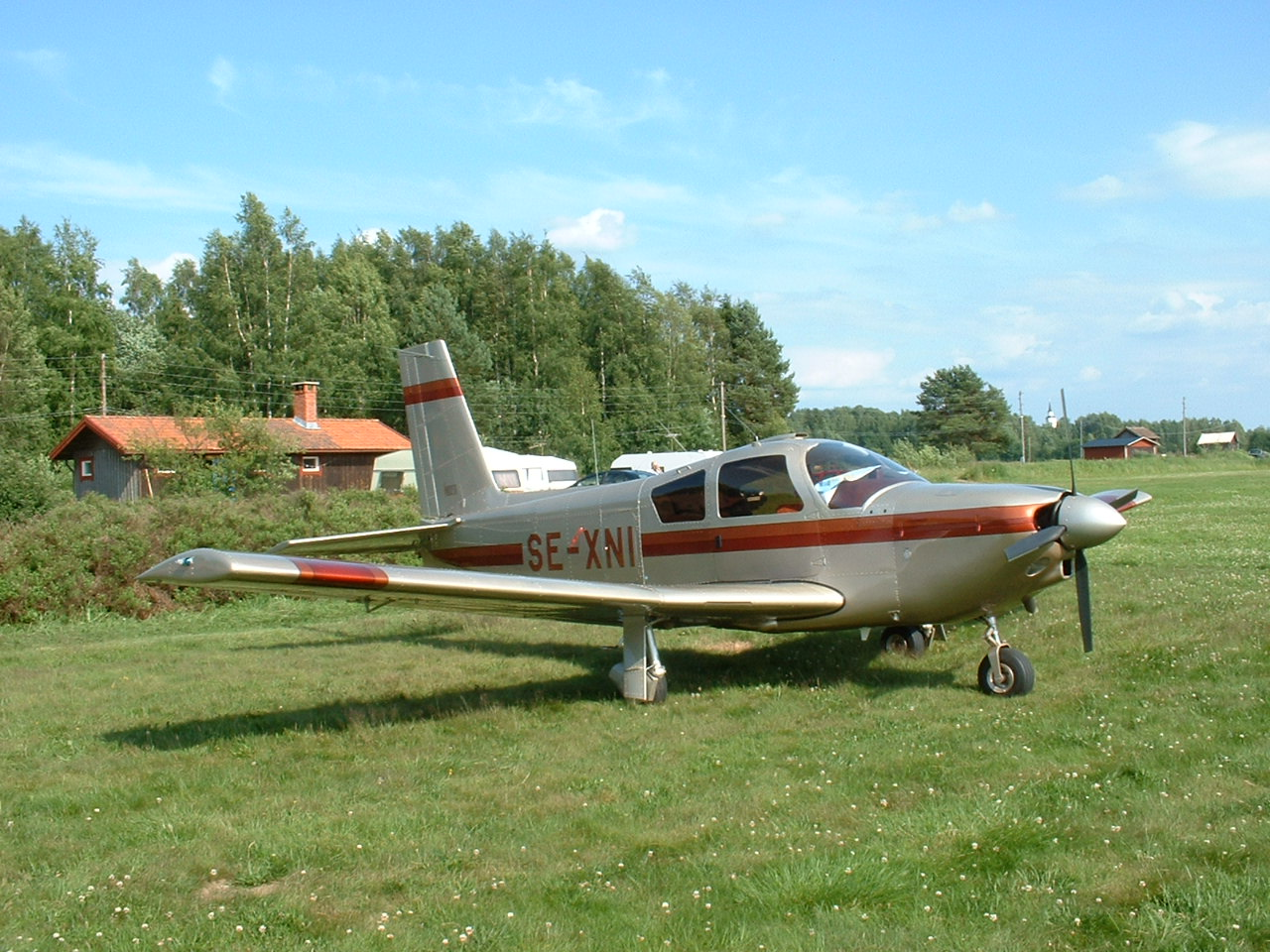

General information
- Type: Light aircraft
- National origin: France
- Manufacturer: SOCATA
- Number built: 55

History
- Manufactured: 1969-1974
- First flight: 7 November 1967
- Developed from: Gardan GY-80 Horizon

The Socata ST-10 Diplomate was a French four-seat civil light aircraft. It was a development of the GY-80 Horizon, and was initially known as the Super Horizon 200, later the Provence, before finally being named the ST-10 Diplomate. The first prototype flew on 7 November 1967, production beginning in 1970. Production ended in 1974, with a total of 56 built.

== Specifications (ST-10) ==
Data from Jane's All the World's Aircraft 1974-75

General characteristics

- Crew: 1
- Capacity: 3 pax
- Length: 7.26 m (23 ft 10 in)
- Wingspan: 9.7 m (31 ft 10 in)
- Height: 2.88 m (9 ft 5 in)
- Wing area: 13 m^{2} (140 sq ft)
- Aspect ratio: 7.1
- Airfoil: root: NACA 4413-6 (modified); tip: NACA 62A-517 (modified)
- Empty weight: 724 kg (1,596 lb)
- Max takeoff weight: 1,222 kg (2,694 lb)
- Powerplant: 1 × Lycoming IO-360-C1B 4-cylinder air-cooled horizontally-opposed piston engine, 150 kW (200 hp)
- Propellers: 2-bladed Hartzell, 1.9 m (6 ft 3 in) diameter constant-speed propeller

Performance

- Maximum speed: 280 km/h (170 mph, 150 kn) at MTOW at sea level
- Cruise speed: 265 km/h (165 mph, 143 kn) at75% power
- Stall speed: 100 km/h (62 mph, 54 kn) flaps down
- Range: 1,385 km (861 mi, 748 nmi) 1 +3 pax
- Service ceiling: 5,000 m (16,000 ft)
- Rate of climb: 5.1 m/s (1,000 ft/min)
- Take-off run: 270 m (886 ft)
- Landing run: 250 m (820 ft)

== See also ==
Related development

- Socata GY-80 Horizon

Related lists

- List of civil aircraft
