= Sud Aviation =

1957–1970 French aircraft manufacturer

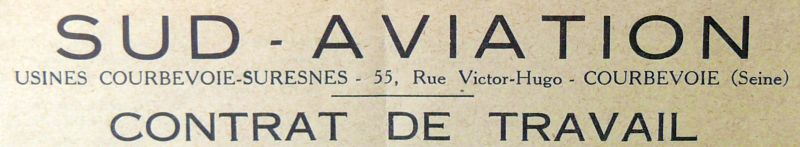
- Type: State-owned
- Industry: Aviation
- Predecessor: SNCASO · SNCASE
- Founded: 1 March 1957; 69 years ago
- Defunct: 10 July 1970
- Fate: Merged into Aérospatiale
- Headquarters: Toulouse, France
- Key people: Maurice Papon (President, 1967–68)
- Number of employees: 24,500 (1967)
- Subsidiaries: SOCATA

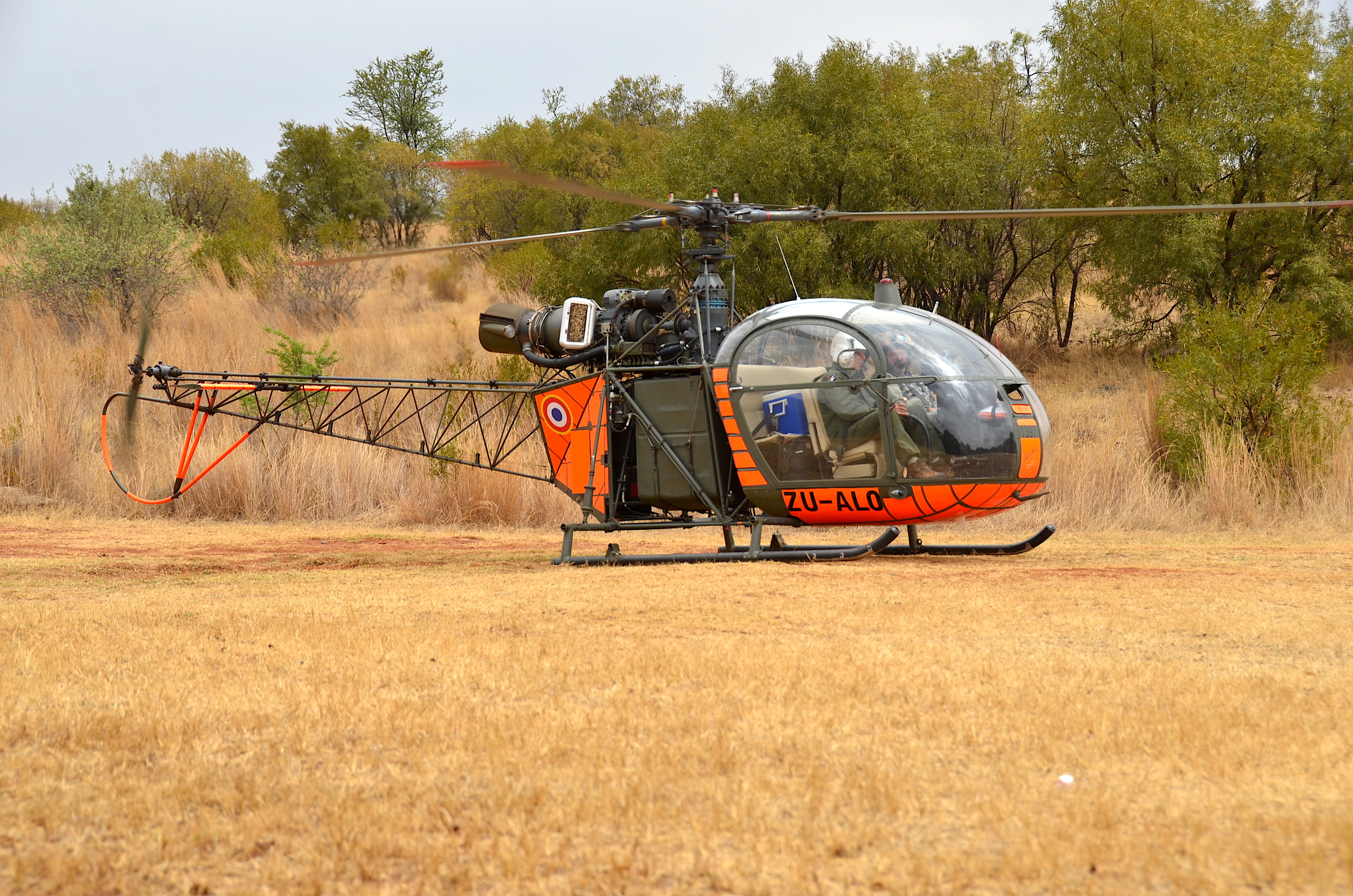
Sud Aviation SE.3130 Alouette II ZU-ALO in South Africa

Société nationale de constructions aéronautiques Sud Aviation (French pronunciation: [syd avjasjɔ̃]; lit. 'National Aeronautical Construction Company South Aviation') was a French state-owned aircraft manufacturer, originating in the merger of SNCASE and SNCASO on 1 March 1957. Both companies had been formed from smaller privately owned corporations that had been nationalized into six regional design and manufacturing pools just prior to the Second World War.

The company became a major manufacturer of helicopters, designing and producing several types which went on to be built in large numbers, including the Alouette II (the first production helicopter powered by a gas turbine engine; first flight in 1955), the Puma (1965) and the Gazelle (1967). In 1967, an agreement between France and the United Kingdom arranged for joint production and procurement of the Puma and Gazelle, together with the British-manufactured Westland Lynx. Sud Aviation also developed the Caravelle, the first jet-powered passenger airliners for the short-medium range market.

In 1970, Sud Aviation merged with both Nord Aviation and the Société d'étude et de réalisation d'engins balistiques (SEREB) to form Aérospatiale.

== History ==
Sud Aviation became an early innovator in the field of commercial jetliners. Almost two years prior to its formation, on 27 May 1955, the first prototype of the Sud Aviation Caravelle, developed by predecessor company SNCASE, had conducted its maiden flight. Sud Aviation continued the Caravelle's flight test programme, and it received its certificate of airworthiness in May 1959, commencing operations with the French flag carrier Air France shortly thereafter. Further orders for the type would be received from various airlines and in four years, 172 Caravelles had been sold. The Caravelle's favourable early sales record was attributed to it having effectively no jet-powered rivals, being the only short-haul jetliner for several years following its introduction.

Several models of the Caravelle were developed, generally in response to the increasing power of available engines, which allowed progressively higher takeoff weights. By 1963, there were six versions of the Caravelle in production, designated III, VI-N, VI-R, 10A, 10B, and X-BIR. The final assembly line for the Caravelle was at Sud Aviation's factory at Blagnac Airport near Toulouse. Parts of the aircraft were also manufactured at other sites across France and in other countries. Production ceased after 282 Caravelles of all types had been manufactured, including 2 prototypes or pre-production aircraft and 280 production aircraft. Sud Aviation's break-even point had been forecast to be around the 200-unit mark.

Despite its commercial success, the Caravelle was not the focus of Sud Aviation's development efforts during the early 1960s as the majority of the company's design engineers were reallocated onto a successor for the Caravelle. The project ambitiously aimed at producing a supersonic transport with the same general size and range as the Caravelle. It was decided that this should be named after the firm's recent success, thus the Super-Caravelle name was applied to the design. The French Government had requested supersonic transport designs from Sud Aviation, as well as French rival firms Nord Aviation and Dassault during the late 1950s and of the three submissions, the Super-Caravelle won the contest with a medium-range design, which was deliberately sized to avoid competition with transatlantic designs assumed to already be on the drawing board. However, in part due to the high projected cost of the project, it was decided, at the direction of both the French and British governments, to form a consortium with the British Aircraft Corporation (BAC) in November 1962, merging their design and production efforts to develop a supersonic transport. Out of these combined efforts, Concorde would emerge. At first, the new consortium intended to produce long-range and short-range versions, however there was no interest in the short-range version and it was dropped to focus on the long-range airliner. The consortium received non-binding options for over 100 of the long-range version from the major airlines of the day, and Pan Am, BOAC, and Air France were to be the launch customers, with six Concordes each.

In the early 1960s, Sud Aviation entered the general aviation light aircraft market when it introduced the GY-80 Horizon, designed by Yves Gardan. The first GY-80 prototype flew on 21 July 1960 and 267 of the type were eventually built.

The Super Frelon was developed by Sud Aviation from the original SE.3200 Frelon. During the type's development, Sud Aviation had risen to prominence as a major helicopter manufacturer, having exported more rotorcraft than any other European rival. Having already developed the popular Alouette II and Alouette III series, the firm was keen to establish a range of helicopters fulfilling various roles, functions, and size requirements; two of the larger models in development by the early 1960s were the Super Frelon and what would become the Aérospatiale SA 330 Puma. The Super Frelon was the largest helicopter in development by the firm, being substantially increased over the earlier Frelon, and was considered to be an ambitious design at the time. The earlier Frelon had been developed to meet the requirements of both the French Navy and the German Navy, which both had released details on its anticipated demands for a heavy helicopter; however, these requirements were revised upwards by the customer, leading to the redesign and emergence of the Super Frelon.

On 23 July 1963, a modified prototype Super Frelon helicopter was used to break the FAI absolute helicopter world speed record, having attained a maximum speed of 217.7 mph (350.4 km/h) during the flight. Flown by Jean Boulet and Roland Coffignot, a total of three international records were broken, these being: speed over 3 km at low altitude, 212.03 mph; speed at any altitude over 15 and 25 km, 217.77 mph; and 100 km closed circuit 207.71 mph. By July 1964, the French Government had placed an initial order for the Super Frelon, intended to perform logistic support duties at the Centre Experimental du Pacifique; negotiations for a further order was already being negotiated for the naval version, which were to be equipped for anti-submarine duties. However, West German support for the Super Frelon programme had already declined by this point, partially due to interest in the rival Sikorsky SH-3 Sea King, which was evaluated against the type. Both civilian and military versions of the Super Frelon were built, with the military variants being the most numerous by far, entering service with the French military as well as being exported to Israel, South Africa, Libya, China and Iraq. Three military variants were produced: military transport, anti-submarine and anti-ship. The transport version is able to carry 38 equipped troops, or alternatively 15 stretchers for casualty evacuation tasks.

During 1963, Sud Aviation began work on what would become the Puma, a mid-sized helicopter, to meet a requirement of the French Army for a medium-sized all-weather helicopter capable of carrying up to 20 soldiers as well as various cargo-carrying duties. The choice was made to develop a completely new design for the helicopter with backing from the French government. The first of two Puma prototypes flew on 15 April 1965; deliveries to the French Army commenced in early 1969. The Puma was an instant success on the export market, numerous countries purchased military variants to serve in their armed forces; the type was also popularly received in the civil market, finding common usage by operators for transport duties to off-shore oil platforms. Throughout most of the 1970s, the SA 330 Puma was the best selling transport helicopter being produced in Europe. By July 1978, over 50 Pumas had already been delivered to civil customers, and the worldwide fleet had accumulated in excess of 500,000 operational hours.

Numerous nations struck deals of manufacture the Puma overseas. Romania produced it under license as the IAR 330, manufacturing at least 163 of the type for the Romanian armed forces, civil operators, and several export customers. Indonesia also undertook domestic manufacturing of the Puma. South Africa became a prolific Puma operator as well, performed their own major modification and production program conducted by the government-owned Atlas Aircraft Corporation to upgrade their own Pumas; the resulting rotorcraft was named the Oryx.

On 20 May 1965, Sud Aviation acquired the bankrupt Morane-Saulnier aircraft company from Potez, and established a new subsidiary, Gerance de Etablissements Morane-Saulnier (GEMS), to manage its assets. In early 1966, Sud Aviation created a new subsidiary, SOCATA, to continue development and production of the Rallye family of light aircraft inherited from Morane-Saulnier. Sud Aviation soon transferred GY-80 production to SOCATA as well.

During 1966, Sud Aviation began working on a light observation helicopter as a successor to its Alouette II. The first prototype Gazelle made its maiden flight on 7 April 1967, it initially flying with a conventional tail rotor. However, this was replaced with the distinctive fenestron tail in early 1968 on the second prototype. Four Gazelle prototypes were flown, including one for British firm Westland Helicopters. On 13 May 1967, a Gazelle demonstrated its speed capabilities when two separate world speed records were broken on a closed course, achieving speeds of 307 km/h over 3 kilometres and 292 km/h over 100 kilometres. Early on, the Gazelle had attracted British interest, which would culminate in the issuing of a major joint development and production work share agreement between Aerospatiale and Westland. The deal, signed in February 1967, facilitated the licensed production in Britain of 292 Gazelles and 48 Pumas for the British armed forces; additionally, Westland received a 65% work share in the manufacturing of the Gazelle, becoming a joint partner for further refinements and upgrades of the type. While principally sold to military operators, a number of Gazelles for the civil market were also sold.

As part of the Anglo-French helicopter agreement signed in February 1967, Sud Aviation gained a 30 per cent share of production work in the Westland Lynx while Westland Helicopters performed the remainder of the work share. It was intended that France would procure the Lynx for its navy, along with a heavily modified armed reconnaissance variant for the French Army. However, in October 1969, the French Army cancelled its requirement for the Lynx, thus development of the specialised army variant was terminated at an early stage.

== Products ==
=== Fixed-wing ===
- Caravelle
- GY-80 Horizon
- Super-Caravelle
- Vautour
- Voltigeur
- Concorde (in partnership with the British Aircraft Corporation)

=== Helicopters ===
- Alouette II
- Alouette III
- Super Frelon
- Puma
- Gazelle
- Lynx (in partnership with Westland Helicopters)
