= SOCATA Rallye family =

French light aircraft

Rallye
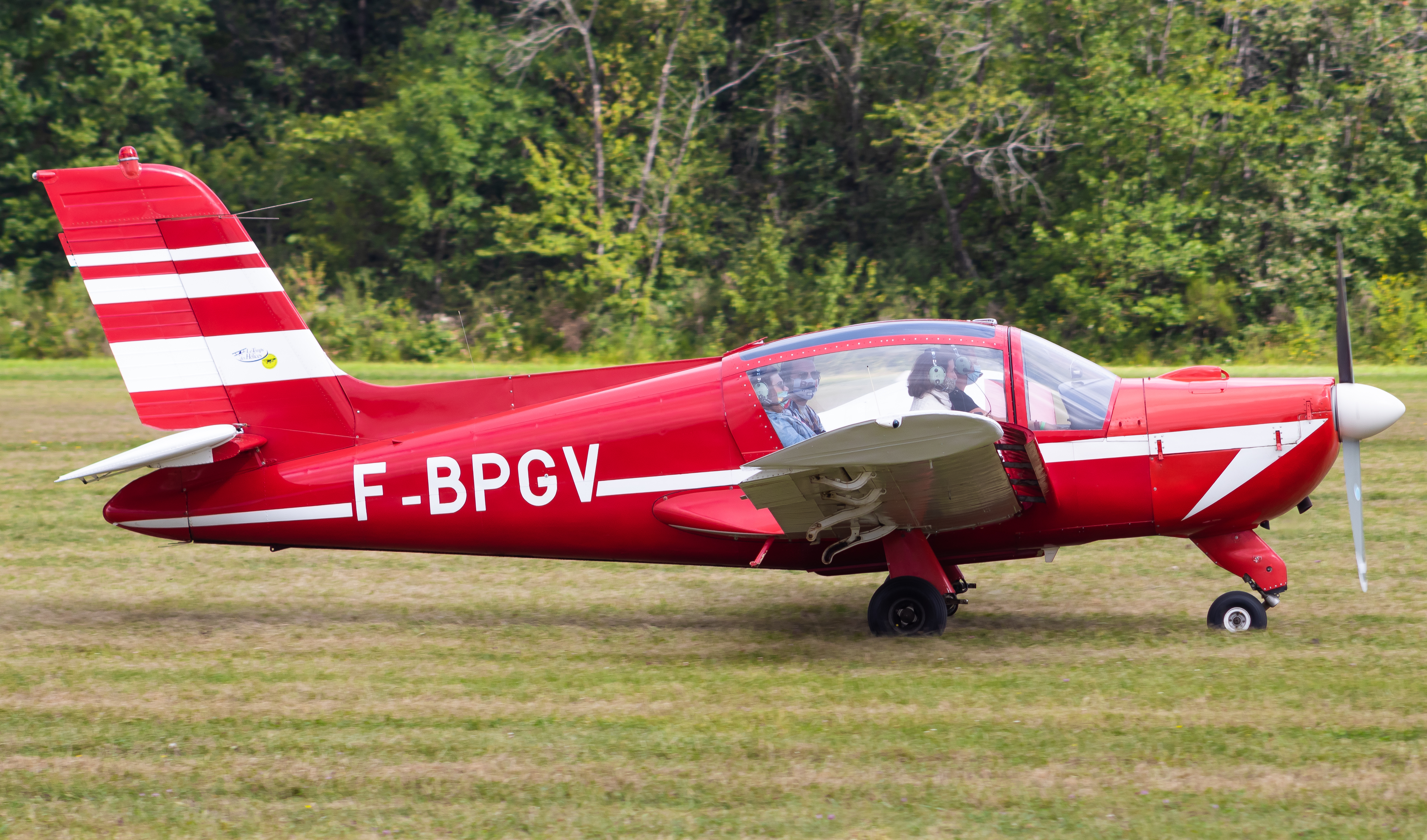
- Socata Rallye Commodore MS.893A

General information
- Type: Tourer/trainer aircraft
- National origin: France
- Manufacturer: SOCATA
- Number built: ~3,300

History
- Manufactured: 1961–1982
- Introduction date: 1961
- First flight: 10 June 1959

The SOCATA Rallye (English: Rally) is a light aircraft that was manufactured by French aviation company SOCATA. It was originally developed during the 1950s by French aircraft manufacturer Morane-Saulnier as the MS.880.

On 10 June 1959, the prototype Rallye conducted the type's maiden flight; on 21 November 1961, type certification for the first production versions of the aircraft, designated as the MS.880B and more powerful MS.885, was awarded. Successive models of the Rallye were developed and manufactured; changes typically involved the installation of more powerful engines, structural strengthening, and the expansion of some of the flight control surfaces, culminating in the MS.890 Rallye Commodore series with higher gross weight and seating for four. As part of efforts to access the lucrative North American market, distributor agreements were formed with multiple US-based companies, such as the Waco Aircraft Company and BFA Aviation, to market, sell, and service the Rallye. These efforts, while not being trouble-free, provided valuable sales of the type.

During 1979, SOCATA (which Morane-Saulnier had previously merged into) decided to rename all of the Rallye series' various models, each being assigned their own individual Gallic names. During the early 1980s, the Rallye was eventually phased out of production in France in favour of the newer Socata TB series. During December 1984, the final SOCATA-built aircraft was delivered; the entire production run had covered approximately 3,300 aircraft. However, the Rallye continued to be produced under licence in Poland by aviation company PZL, which marketed their own models under the PZL Koliber (English: Hummingbird) name. On 18 April 1978, the first flight of a prototype Koliber occurred; quantity production of the type commenced in Poland during the following year.

== Development ==
During 1958, in response to the launch of a French government competition seeking such an aircraft, French aviation company Morane-Saulnier decided to commence work upon the design of a new single-engined light aircraft, initially designated as the MS.880 Rallye Club. According to the aviation magazine Flying, in comparison with other light aircraft of the era, was relatively slow-moving and cheap fixed-wing aircraft; specifically, the magazine lauded the Rallye as being available "for a price much lower than any true STOL [short takeoff and landing], four-place aircraft". It featured a relatively simplistic design which enabled it to be provided at a highly affordable price to customers, which, along with the aircraft's capable STOL performance, was viewed as being a highly attractive selling point, particularly to customers within the North American market.

On 10 June 1959, the prototype Rallye, powered by a 90 hp (67 kW) engine, conducted its maiden flight. On 21 November 1961, the first production versions of the aircraft, designated as the MS.880B and more powerful MS.885, received their type certification, clearing them to perform operational flights. Thereafter, a range of improvements and alterations were progressively made upon the design as new models of the Rallye were introduced; typical advances included the adoption of more powerful engines, improved payload capability, and strengthened structure, the addition of wheel fairings, increased ground clearance for the propeller, expanded rudder and ailerons, and changes to the cockpit canopy arrangement.

On 19 November 1962, Morane-Saulnier filed for bankruptcy, and in January 1963 was placed under the control of Potez, which established the Société d'Exploitation des Etablissements Morane-Saulnier (SEEMS) to manage its assets. On 20 May 1965, Sud Aviation acquired SEEMS from Potez, forming Gérance des Etablissements Morane-Saulnier (GEMS). In early 1966, Sud Aviation created another new subsidiary, SOCATA, to continue development and production of the Rallye series. SOCATA continued to manufacture the Rallye in large numbers through the remainder of the 1960s and through the 1970s.

In the late 1960s, SOCATA pursued the development of an enlarged 7-seat version powered by a 300 hp (220 kW) Lycoming IO-540-K engine, the ST.60 Rallye 7. Two prototypes were constructed: a version with retractable tricycle landing gear, first flown on 3 January 1969, and an otherwise similar aircraft with fixed landing gear. However, SOCATA was not confident that a sufficient market for the aircraft existed, and no further production ensued. SOCATA subsequently introduced the enlarged MS.890 Rallye Commodore series with a heavier airframe and four seats; production and development of the MS.880 and MS.890 series continued in parallel, and the enlarged and strengthened empennage of the MS.890 was adapted to MS.880 variants using more powerful engines and those approved for spins.

Also in the late 1960s, United States aviation entrepreneur Alexander Berger—whose Allied Aero Industries holding company owned the Franklin Engine Company and Jacobs Aircraft Engine Company—formed a new venture to market European light aircraft under the banner of the defunct Waco Aircraft Company. Based in Pottstown, Pennsylvania, Waco made arrangements to market, sell, and service the Rallye throughout the sizable and attractive North American market, and introduced a licensed American-built version of the Rallye Commodore badged as the Waco MS.294A Minerva, powered by a 220 hp (160 kW) Franklin engine. Waco also sold the 150ST, 180CT and 235CT in the United States. However, the Rallye had little time to prove itself prior to Waco winding up its aviation activities following Berger's death in 1971. As a consequence of Waco's dissolution, third party aviation companies purchased the various leftover assets and continued to provide spare parts and services to American owners of the Rallye.

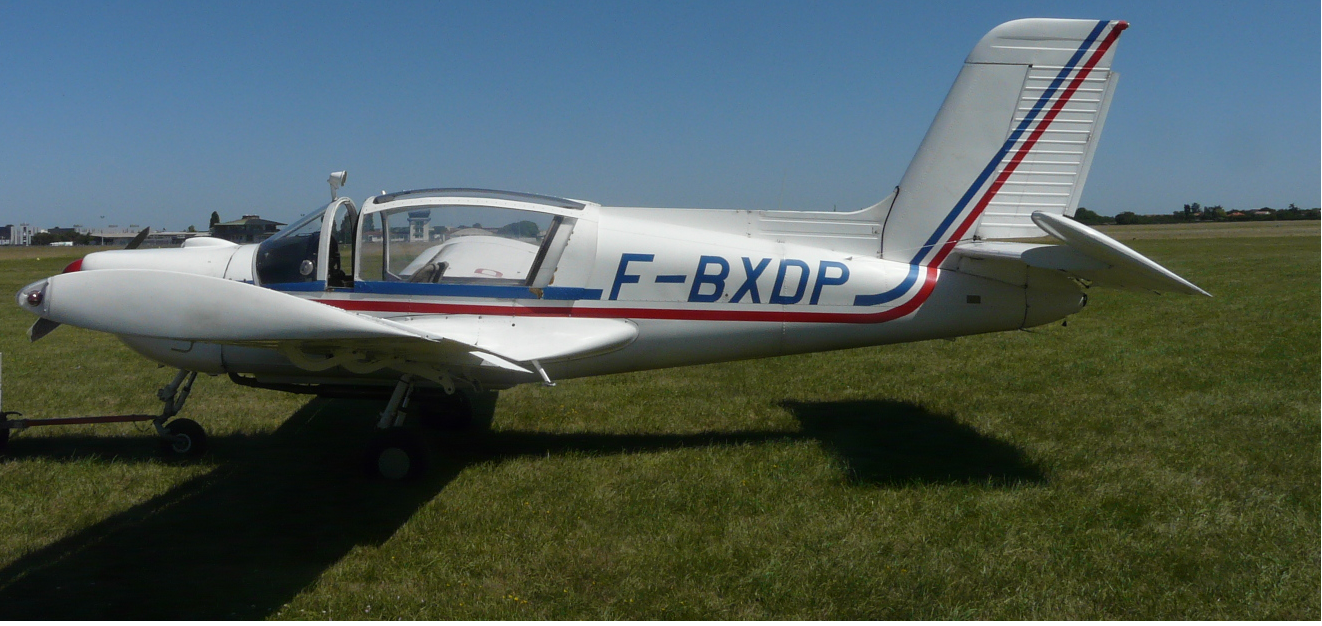
Socata MS-893E Rallye 180GT

In the early 1970s, New York-based company BFA Aviation was appointed as the type's new distributor within North America. BFA, via several subsidiaries of its parent company Aerocon Inc, performed the final assembly of the Rallye for those sold to American customers. The use of American suppliers within the aircraft's supply chain, such as the Franklin 6A-350-C1 engine, Hartzell or McCauley-built propellers, wheels, brakes, and some of the cockpit instrumentation, was made upon some models of the Rallye, such as the Minerva. Under the initial arrangement, US-built components would be shipped across the Atlantic Ocean to reach the facilities of Sud Aviation and its subsidiary companies in France for integration onto a French-built airframe which, following completion and initial test flights, would be disassembled into sections and conveyed to BFA Aviation in the United States for final assembly and sale; efforts to reduce unnecessary shipping and thus cost were explored.

During 1979, SOCATA decided to embark upon a new production programme, one of the results of which being the renaming of the various models of Rallye series, each one receiving an individual, "more Gallic" name. During the 1980s, the type was gradually superseded and phased out of production in France by the newer Socata TB series. During December 1984, the final Rallye of approximately 3,300 aircraft, an armed R235 Guerrier model, was delivered.

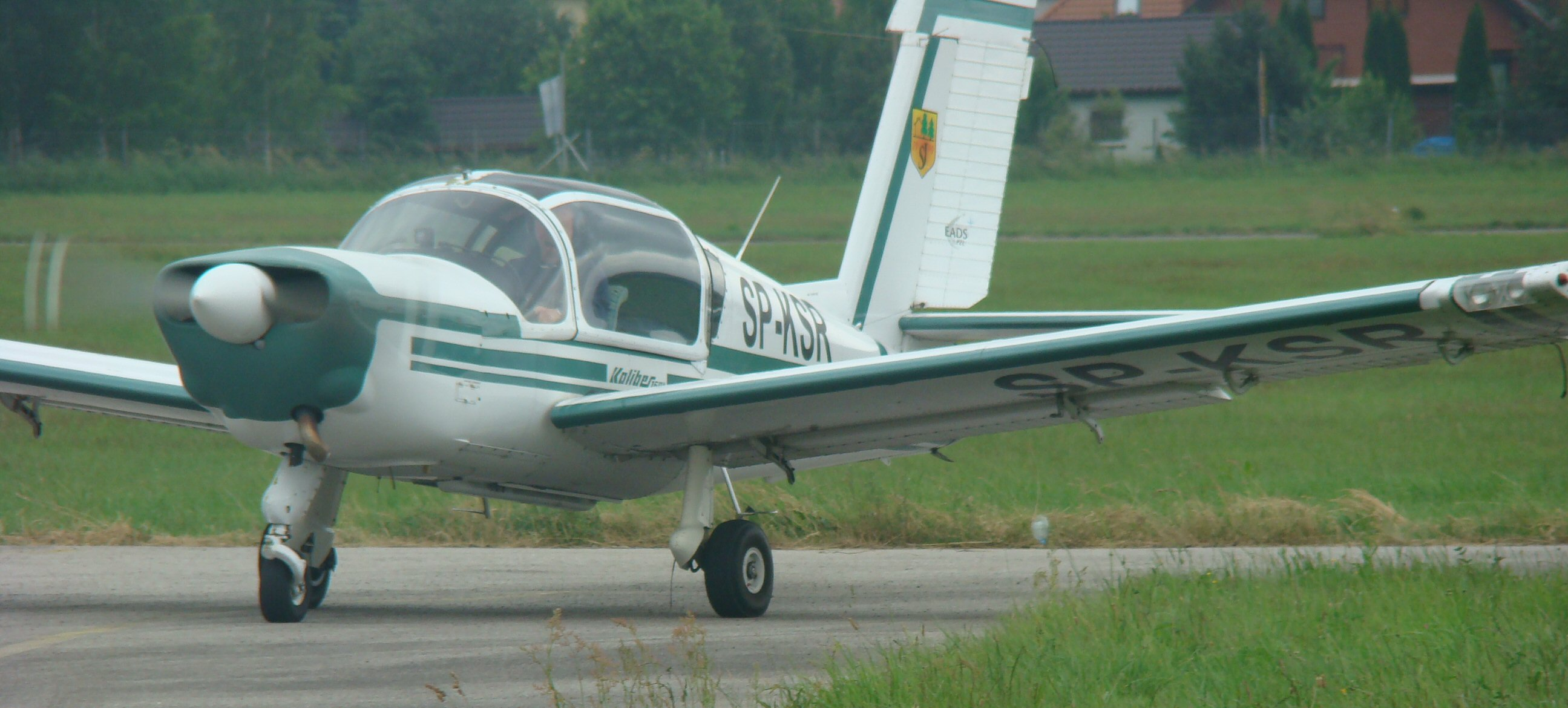
A PZL Koliber, 2014. Note the type's large tail fin

SOCATA's decision to terminate production in France was not the end of all manufacturing activity for the type however. During the 1970s, SOCATA had sold a licence for production of the Rallye 100ST model to the Polish State aviation company PZL, which led to the aircraft being independently constructed in its facilities in Warsaw as the PZL Koliber (Humming Bird). On 18 April 1978, the first PZL-built aircraft performed its maiden flight. During 1979, quantity production of the Koliber commenced; an initial batch of ten aircraft was produced that year.

During February 1994, type certification of the Koliber was granted by the American Federal Aviation Administration, clearing the Polish derivatives to be sold and operated within the North American market. Shortly thereafter, a distributor arrangement was formed with Cadmus Corporation to market and service the Koliber in the Americas. Among its uses, the aircraft proved to be a good trainer, in part due to the generous visibility provided from its cockpit and forgiving flight characteristics.

== Design ==
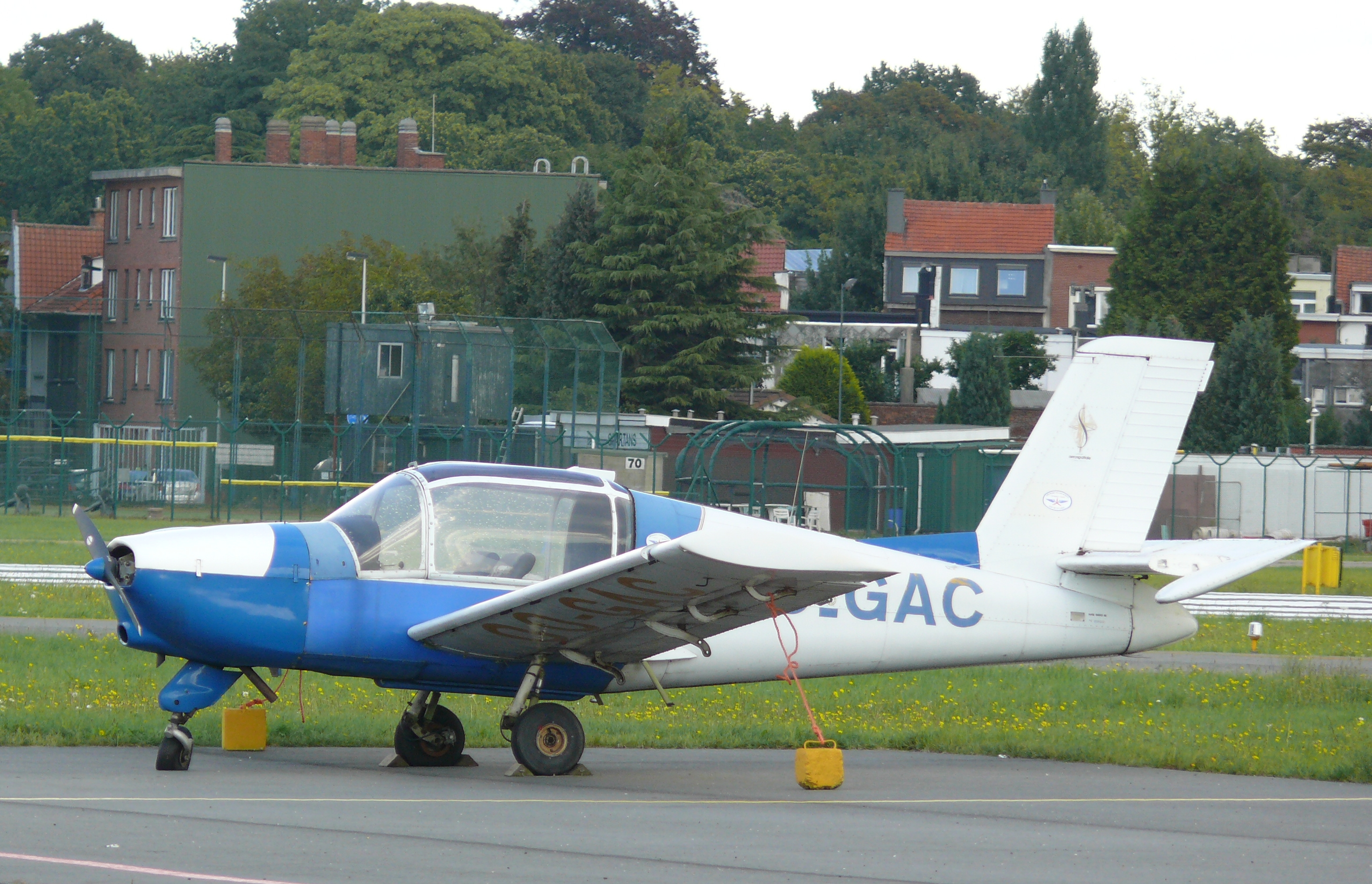
A MS.880B Rallye Club

The SOCATA Rallye is a single-engined, low-wing monoplane light aircraft, capable of STOL (short takeoff and landing) performance. The Rallye is considered to be sound and functional aircraft; efforts were made upon later-built aircraft to improve the type's visual appeal and to clean up the exterior. Composed of all metal construction, it is typically outfitted with a fixed tricycle landing gear, complete with an offset free-castering nosewheel and relatively closely spaced main gear; however, an alternative landing gear configuration is used upon the 235 C model, which was provisioned with fixed tailwheel landing gear instead. Unusually, the landing gear of the Rallye is articulated in order to better withstand the sharp forces that are imposed during STOL landings. Flying Magazine noted that the Rallye is "a very nice-landing aircraft".

The Rallye is equipped with a cantilever wing, which incorporated interconnected full-span automatic leading edge slats, wide-chord slotted ailerons, and wide-span Fowler-type trailing edge flaps. The combination of full-span slats and large Fowler flaps provided the aircraft with its capable slow-speed flight performance. Fuel is also internally carried within the wings. According to Flying Magazine, the Rallye possessed a generous degree of controllability and was relatively forgiving to fly, being extremely difficult to mishandle to the point where effective control of the aircraft would be lost. The aircraft is safe to fly at practically any piloting skill level. While the Rallye has fair manoeuvrability, such as during loops and rolls, the execution of aerobatic maneuvers is not officially approved by the manufacturer.

The aircraft's power was provided from one of a range of progressively more powerful air-cooled engines; such as the early Rallye Cub model, which was powered by a 100 hp (75 kW) Continental O-200-A engine, while the newer Rallye 235 variant was furnished with a 235 hp (175 kW) Lycoming O-540 engine.

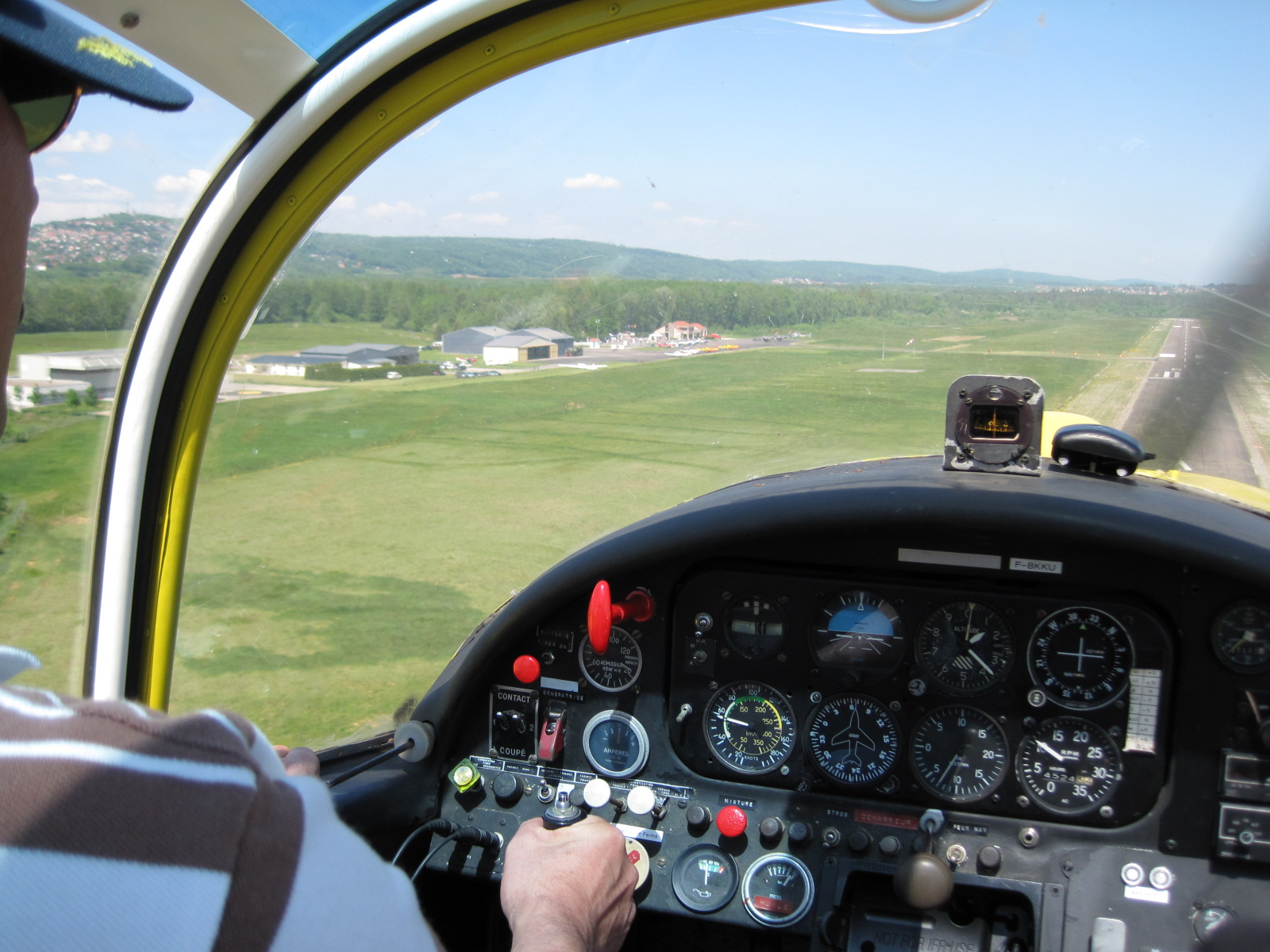
In-cockpit view of a Rallye, 2011

The Rallye was fitted with a bulbous cockpit, which was capable of accommodating two/three people in the basic lower-powered variants and up to four personnel within the more powerful models of the aircraft, some of which were designed to function as glider tugs and banner bearers. The canopy slides rearwards to provide access to and from the cockpit, aided by a step located just underneath the wing's trailing edge; on the ground. On the ground, the canopy should remain slightly open when occupied to allow for adequate airflow; in flight, the canopy can be left open at speed up to a maximum of 94 knots.

The cockpit has been described as being relatively noisy, but also often praised for the provision of excellent external visibility; Flight Magazine stated that "It is almost like being in a four-place open cockpit plane". Typically, the Rallye would be furnished with dual flying controls, each being complete with their own control stick, upon which controls for the intercom would be often mounted. While fully featured cockpit instrumentation was an available option to be installed upon the Rallye, the additional weight of this equipment would noticeably impact the aircraft's performance; thus, customers would have to weigh up the benefits of having superior flight performance or being able to make use of greater amount of cockpit features.

== Variants ==
=== French production ===
==== Lightweight airframe (MS.880 series) ====
MS.880
Two-seat prototype powered by 90 hp (67 kW) Continental C90-14F, conventional landing gear, 1 built.
MS.880A
Three-seat prototype with enlarged cockpit, swept vertical fin, 1 built.
MS.880B Rallye Club
Production version of MS.880B with 100 hp (75 kW) Continental O-200-A, 1,100 built.
MS.881
105 hp (78 kW) Potez engine. 12 built. Two-seat aircraft.
MS.883
115 hp (86 kW) Lycoming engine. 77 built. Two-seat aircraft.
MS.885 Super Rallye
Two/three-seat version; first flight 1 January 1961. 145 hp (108 kW) Continental O-300 engine. 212 built.
MS.886
150 hp (110 kW) Lycoming engine. Three built.
Rallye 100S Sport
Two-seat trainer powered by 100 hp (75 kW) Rolls-Royce Continental O-200-A, 55 built.
MS.880B Rallye 100T
MS.880B with minor changes, 3 built.
Rallye 100ST
100T with three or four seats, 45 lb (20 kg) gross weight increase, 45 built.
Rallye 125
Four-seat version of 100-T, powered by 125 hp (93 kW) Lycoming O-235.
Rallye 150T
Four-seat Rallye 100ST, increased gross weight, enlarged tail, 150 hp (110 kW) Lycoming 0-320-E2A, 25 built.
Rallye 150ST
150T stressed for spins, 66 built, sold by Waco in US.
SOCATA 110ST Galopin
Improved Rallye 100ST powered by 110 hp (82 kW) Lycoming O-235-L2A, 76 built. Can be operated as a three/four-seat aircraft if spins are prohibited.
SOCATA 150SV Garnement
Improved version of Rallye 150ST with 155 hp (116 kW) Lycoming O-320-D2A, 5 built.
SOCATA 180T Galerian
Improved version of Rallye 150T with 180 hp (130 kW) Lycoming O-360-A3A, 5 built, sold by Waco in US.

==== Heavy airframe (MS.890 series) ====
All variants beginning with the MS.890 are full four-seat aircraft.

MS.890 Rallye Commodore
The first version to incorporate four-place seating. 145 hp (108 kW) Continental engine. Eight built.
MS.892 Rallye Commodore 150
Similar to the MS.890 but with 150 hp (110 kW) Lycoming 0-320 engine. Later designated Rallye 150.
MS.893 Rallye Commodore 180
180 hp (130 kW) Lycoming O-360 engine. Later designated Rallye 180. Further redesignated SOCATA Gaillard or SOCATA Galérien (glider towing version).
MS.894 Rallye Minerva
220 hp (160 kW) Franklin 6A-350 engine. Later designated Rallye 220. Some assembled and sold as Waco Minerva in US. 211 built.
Rallye 235
Powered by 235 hp (175 kW) Lycoming O-540. Redesignated SOCATA Gabier.
SOCATA 235CA Gaucho
235 modified for aerial application with tailwheel landing gear and chemical hopper in rear seat area; 9 built.
SOCATA R235 Guerrier
Military version of Gabier/Rallye 235.
SOCATA Gaillard
Rallye 180 renamed
SOCATA Galérien
Glider tug or banner-towing version of the Rallye 180
SOCATA Gabier
renamed Rallye 235
SOCATA ST.60 Rallye 7
Enlarged 7-seat version, 300 hp (220 kW) Lycoming IO-540-K engine, two prototypes built.
Waco Minerva
Sales of the Rallye Minerva in the USA

=== Polish production ===
PZL-110 Koliber

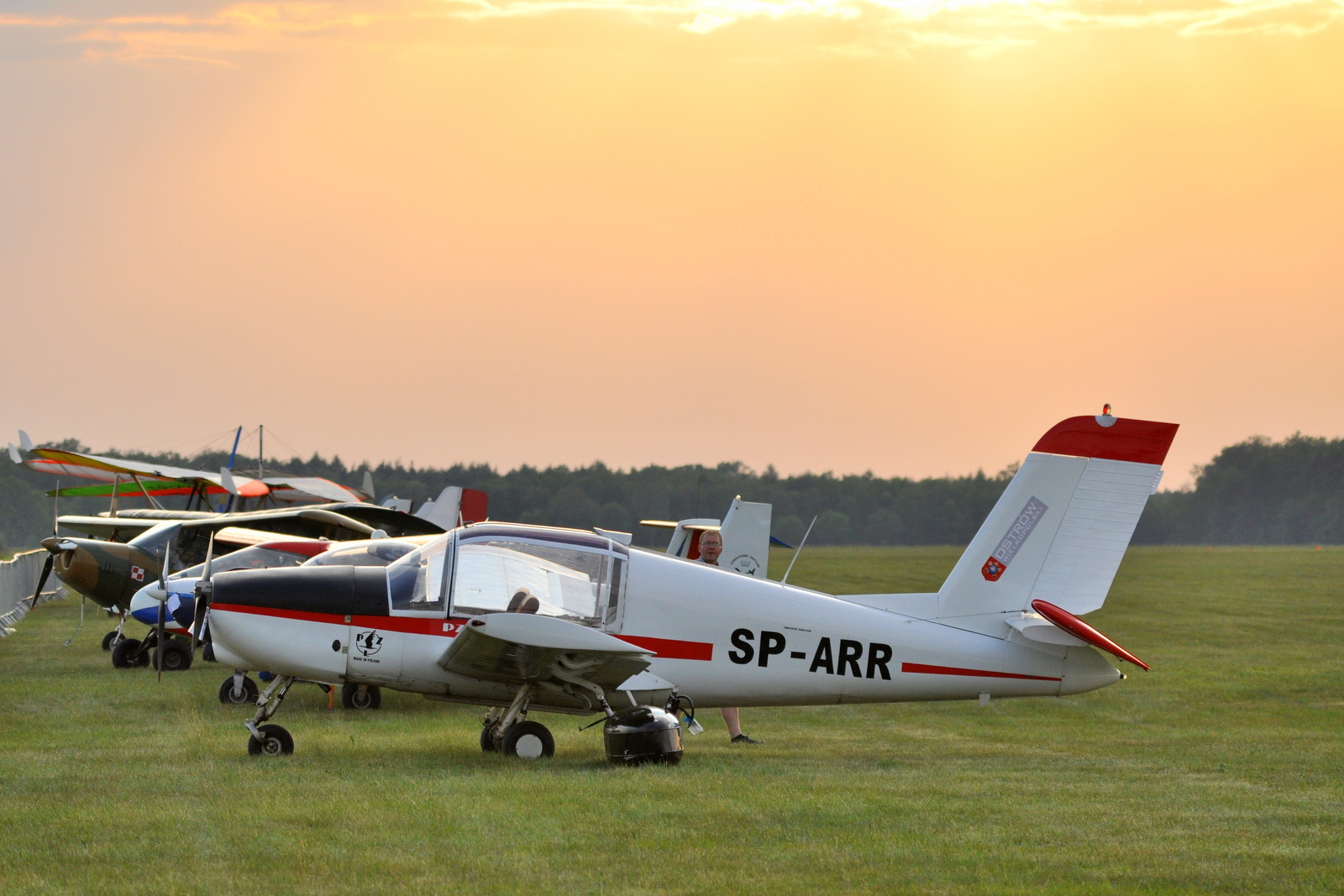
PZL-110 Koliber

Initial licence production version powered by PZL licensed 116 hp (87 kW) Franklin 4A-235, based on Rallye 100 ST. Production 32 aircraft.
PZL-110 Koliber 150
150 hp (110 kW) Lycoming O-320 engine.
PZL-110 Koliber 160
160 hp (120 kW) Lycoming O-320 engine.
PZL-111 Koliber 235
235 hp (175 kW) Lycoming O-540 engine.

== Operators ==
=== Military operators ===
Burkina Faso

- Burkina Faso Air Force

Central African Republic

- Force Aérienne Centrafricaine

Djibouti

- Djibouti Air Force

Dominican Republic

- Dominican Air Force

El Salvador

- Salvadoran of El Salvador

France

- French Air Force
- French Navy

Israel

- Israeli Air Force

Libya

- Libyan Air Force

Madagascar

- Malagasy Air Force

Mauritania

- Military of Mauritania

Morocco

- Royal Moroccan Gendarmerie

Rwanda

- Rwandan Defence Forces

Senegal

- Senegalese Air Force

Seychelles

- Seychelles Air Force

=== Government civil operators ===
France

- Directorate-General of Customs and Indirect Taxes

== Aircraft on display ==
- City of Norwich Aviation Museum – Morane-Saulnier 880B Rallye Club
- Shannon Aviation Museum - Morane-Saulnier 880B Rallye Club

== Specifications (180 GT) ==
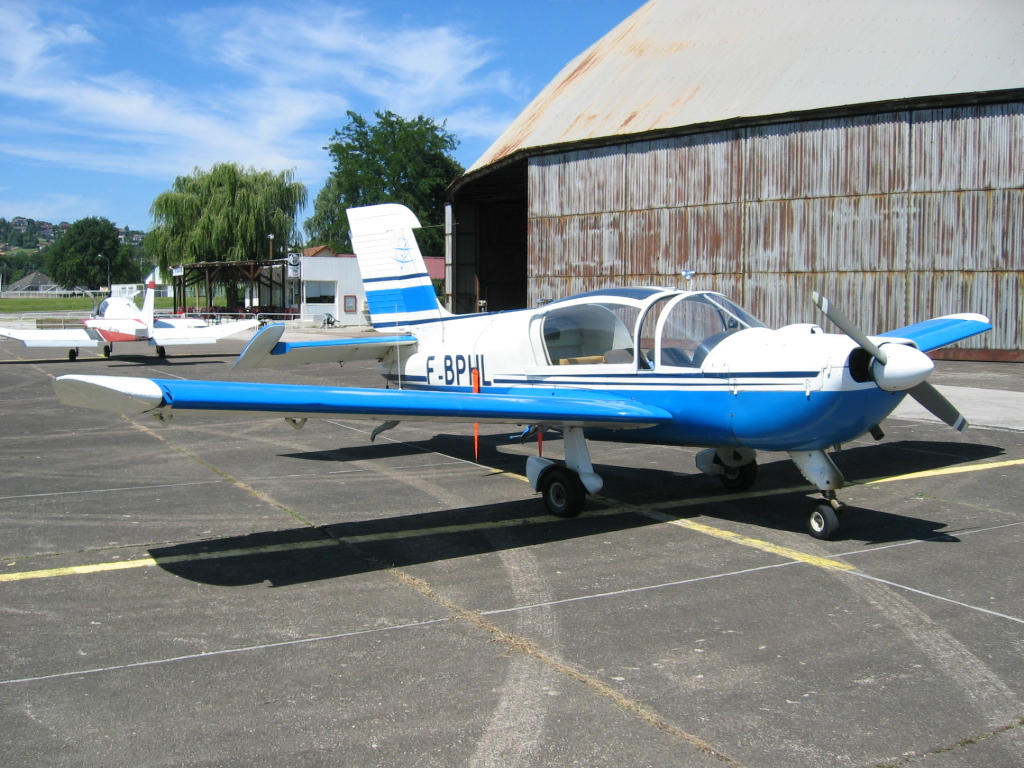
Morane Saulnier Rallye 893

Data from Jane's All the World's Aircraft 1976–77

General characteristics

- Crew: one
- Capacity: three passengers
- Length: 7.24 m (23 ft 9 in)
- Wingspan: 9.74 m (31 ft 11 in)
- Height: 2.8 m (9 ft 2 in)
- Wing area: 12.3 m^{2} (132 sq ft)
- Airfoil: NACA 63A416
- Empty weight: 570 kg (1,257 lb)
- Max takeoff weight: 1,050 kg (2,315 lb)
- Powerplant: × Lycoming O-360-A3A 4-cylinder air-cooled horizontally-opposed piston engine, 134 kW (180 hp)
- Propellers: 2-bladed variable-pitch propeller

Performance

- Maximum speed: 240 km/h (150 mph, 130 kn)
- Cruise speed: 225 km/h (140 mph, 121 kn)
- Stall speed: 92 km/h (57 mph, 50 kn)
- Range: 1,300 km (810 mi, 700 nmi)
- Service ceiling: 3,600 m (11,800 ft)
- Rate of climb: 3.85 m/s (758 ft/min)
- Wing loading: 85.4 kg/m^{2} (17.5 lb/sq ft)
- Power/mass: 0.13 kW/kg (0 hp/lb)
