= James Benson (RAF officer) =

British flying ace of WWII

- Born: 17 July 1914; Tufnell Park, London, England
- Died: 12 July 1987 (aged 72); Alton, Hampshire, England
- Military career
- Allegiance: United Kingdom
- Branch: Royal Air Force
- Service years: 1939–1946
- Rank: Wing commander
- Conflicts: Second World War: Battle of Britain; Operation Diver
- Awards: Distinguished Service Order; Distinguished Flying Cross & Bar

James Benson, DSO, DFC & Bar (17 July 1914 – 12 July 1987) was a British flying ace who served with the Royal Air Force (RAF) during the Second World War. He was credited with having shot down ten aircraft and six V-1 flying bombs.

From London, Benson was training as a pilot in the Royal Air Force Volunteer Reserve when he was called up for service in the RAF on the outbreak of the Second World War in September 1939. After his training was completed in July 1940, he was posted to No. 141 Squadron and flew Boulton Paul Defiant night fighters during the latter stages of the Battle of Britain. Paired with Lewis Brandon as his radar operator, with whom he flew operationally for much of his wartime service, he claimed his first aerial victory in December 1940 and further successes followed, resulting in an award of the Distinguished Flying Cross (DFC). In February 1943, he and Brandon were posted to No. 157 Squadron, another night fighter unit. Flying de Havilland Mosquito heavy fighters, he destroyed several more German aircraft, as well as V-1 flying bombs when his squadron was involved in the RAF's campaign against these. Benson went on to be awarded a Bar to his DFC and the Distinguished Service Order in recognition of his successes. Leaving the RAF after the end of the war, he subsequently worked for Esso Petroleum. He died in 1987, aged 72.

== Early life ==
James Gillies Benson was born on 17 July 1914 in London, England. He went to Westminster School and once his education was completed, found employment with Esso Petroleum. In June 1939, he joined the Royal Air Force Volunteer Reserve to train as a pilot. His initial flight training was at No. 15 Elementary & Reserve Training School at Redhill.

== Second World War ==
On the outbreak of the Second World War in September 1939, Benson was called up for service with the Royal Air Force (RAF) and commenced further training. After a period at No. 1 Initial Training Wing he went to No. 6 EFTS at Sywell in October before going onto No. 8 Flying Training School at Montrose the following March. Commissioned as a pilot officer on the completion of his training, he went to Aston Down for familiarisation on the Boulton Paul Defiant fighter. In late July he was posted to No. 141 Squadron.

=== Service with No. 141 Squadron ===
No. 141 Squadron was based at Grangemouth with its Defiants, having been withdrawn there after it incurred heavy losses during the early stages of the Battle of Britain. It was now engaged in patrols over shipping convoys but in September began training in night fighting duties with a detachment operating from Biggin Hill. The entire squadron moved south to Gravesend in November. In the evening of 22 December, he engaged and destroyed a Heinkel He 111 medium bomber to the east of Etchingham. In early 1941 he was posted to an Operational Conversion Unit and then took up instructing duties at No. 62 Operational Training Unit at Usworth. He was promoted to flying officer in July.

In October Benson rejoined No. 141 Squadron, which had been reequipped with the Bristol Beaufighter heavy fighter, and was assigned Lewis Brandon as his navigator and radar operator; the pair would fly together for much of their operational service in the Second World War. Their first success came on the night of 15 February 1942, when Benson shot down a Dornier Do 217 medium bomber to the south of Blyth. He damaged a Do 217 to the east of Tyne on the night of 4 June. The next month Benson went back to No. 62 OTU as an instructor, with Brandon going as well. The pair were duly recognised for their successes over the preceding months with an award of the Distinguished Flying Cross (DFC). The citation which acknowledged both men, was published in early October in The London Gazette and read:

Flying Officer Benson and Pilot Officer Brandon have flown together in night operations as pilot and observer respectively. One night in February, 1942, they destroyed a Dornier 217. In a previous sortie, Flying Officer Benson destroyed a Heinkel 111. Both these officers have always displayed a high standard of efficiency and devotion to duty.

— London Gazette, No. 35727, 2 October 1942

=== Service with No. 157 Squadron ===
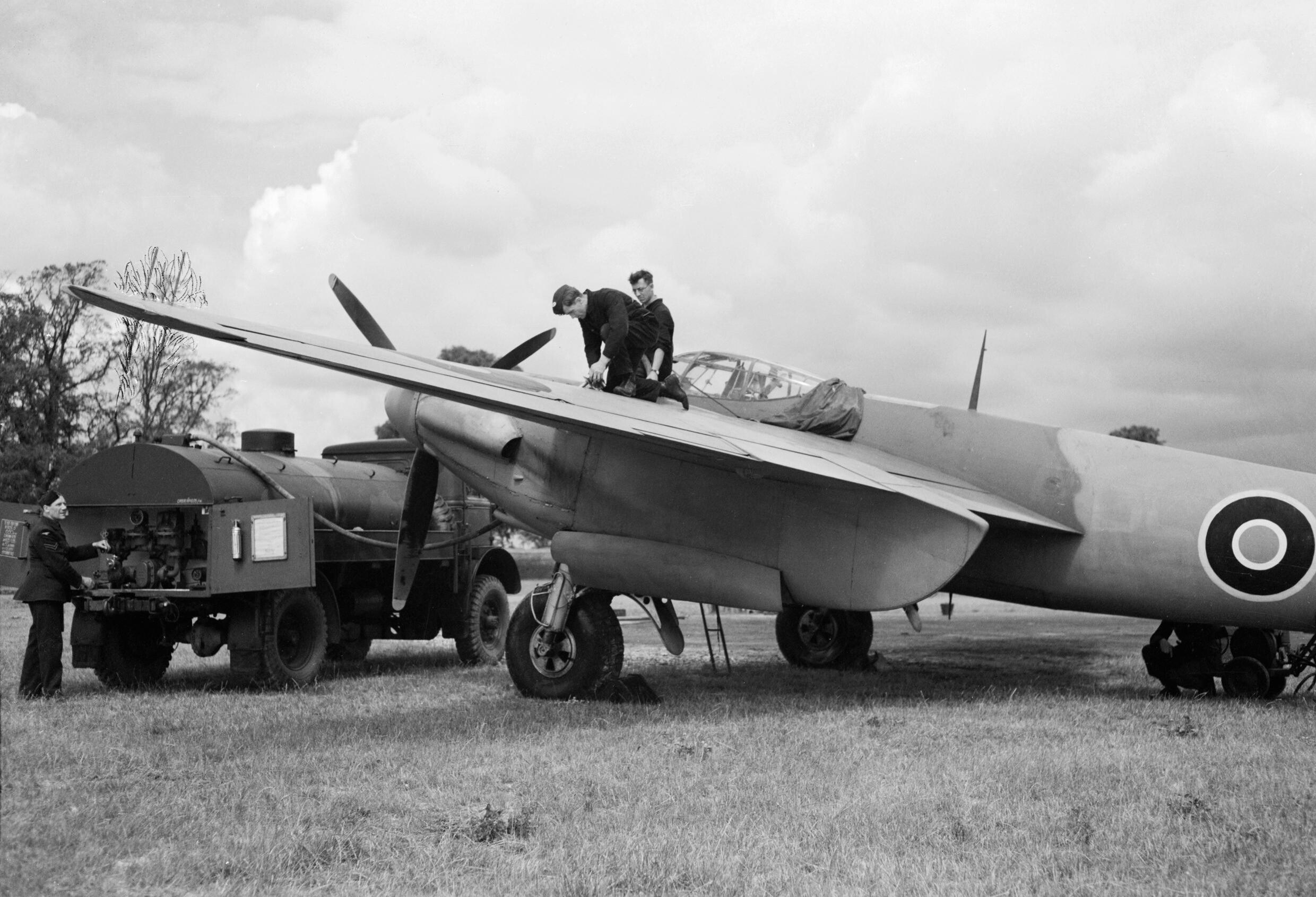
A de Havilland Mosquito heavy fighter of No. 157 Squadron being refueled at Hunsdon, June 1943

Benson and Brandon performed instructing duties until February 1943, at which time they were posted to No. 157 Squadron. This was based at Castle Camps but was about to move south to Bradwell Bay with its de Havilland Mosquito Mk II heavy fighters. From there it carried out nighttime intruder sorties to German-occupied Europe while still performing interception duties. On the night of 14 April, Benson intercepted and destroyed a Do 217. On an intruder sortie to the airfield at Saint-Trond on 3 July he shot down another Do 217. Brandon was posted away to another squadron the next month and in his absence Benson was unable to achieve any aerial victories.

In January 1944 Benson resumed his partnership with Brandon when the latter returned to No. 157 Squadron that month. At this time, the unit was based at Predannack, with a move to Valley to follow two months later. In May, the squadron was transferred to Bomber Command, to carry out bomber support duties as part of No. 100 Group. It had switched to the latest Mosquito, the Mk XIX, and Benson and Brandon claimed the first success for the type on 12 June, destroying a Junkers Ju 188 medium bomber over Forest of Compiègne. Shortly afterwards, the Germans commenced launching V-1 flying bombs against the southeast of England. To combat this threat, the RAF commenced Operation Diver, with No. 157 Squadron one of the units tasked with intercepting and destroying V-1s before they could reach their targets. Over a five-week period from late June to the end of July, Benson destroyed six V-1s.

By this time Benson was an acting squadron leader and commanding one of the flights of No. 157 Squadron. After its role in Operation Diver concluded in August, the squadron reverted to its bomber support operations which mostly involved intruder sorties to Luftwaffe night fighter airfields. On the night of 11 September Benson destroyed a pair of Ju 188s over Zeeland. Two nights later, he damaged a Junkers Ju 88 night fighter near Bonn. The following month he was awarded a Bar to his DFC, the published citation for which read:

Squadron Leader Benson has completed a large number of sorties. He has been responsible for the destruction of at least five enemy aircraft and six flying bombs; he has also effectively attacked several locomotives and supply trucks. This officer has shown a fine fighting spirit and his gallantry and determination have been exceptional.

— London Gazette, No. 36756, 20 October 1944

On a sortie to Frankfurt on the night of 10 November, Benson shot down a Ju 88. He damaged Ju 88s on 17 and 23 December respectively and then on 24 December, destroyed a Messerschmitt Bf 110 heavy fighter. This was one of four aircraft shot down by the squadron's pilots that night, the most successful of its existence. Benson destroyed a Heinkel He 219 heavy fighter over the airfield at Wesendorf on the night of 5 January 1945, his final aerial victory. At the end of the month, he and Brandon were rested. He was promoted to acting wing commander and sent to Great Massingham where he was to establish and lead No. 1692 Bomber Support Training Unit. Brandon joined him as chief ground instructor. In March, they were awarded the Distinguished Service Order in recognition of their successes as night fighters. The published citation read:

These officers have displayed the highest standard of skill and determination. As pilot and observer respectively they have completed a very large number of sorties and have inflicted much loss on the enemy. Among their successes is the destruction of 10 enemy aircraft, the last of which they shot down one night in January, 1945. Their devotion to duty has been unfailing.

— London Gazette, No. 36980, 13 March 1945

Benson's substantive rank was made up to squadron leader in April, and in October, with the war concluded, was released from the RAF.

== Later life ==
Benson resumed working for Esso Petroleum but joined the Royal Auxiliary Air Force (RAAF) when it was reconstituted in June 1946, retaining his wing commander rank. He served with No. 613 Squadron at Ringway in Manchester. Brandon wrote an account of his and Benson's wartime service; this was published as Night Flyer in 1961. Benson died on 12 July 1987, at the age of 72.

Benson is credited with the destruction of ten aircraft, as well as six V-1 flying bombs. He also damaged four aircraft. All but one of these were achieved with Brandon as his radar operator.
