= Sopwith Buffalo =

British WW1 Armoured biplane fighter/reconnaissance aircraft

Buffalo
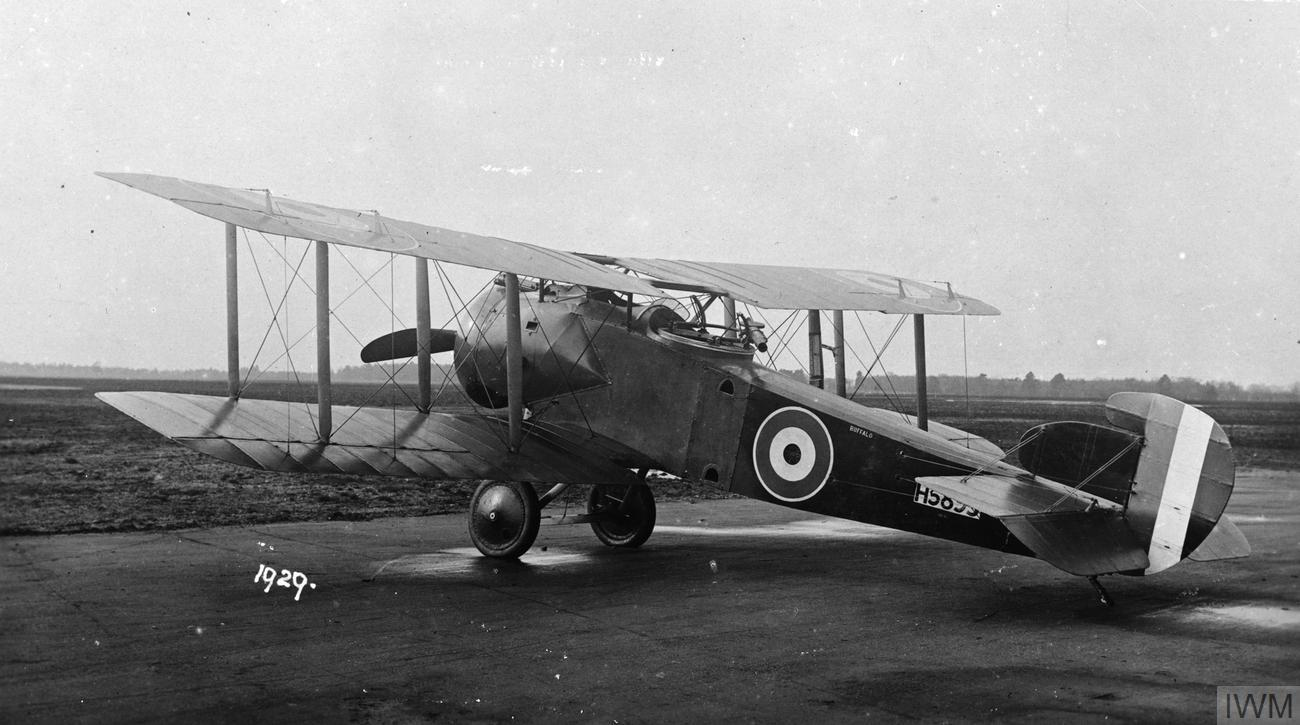

General information
- Type: Armoured fighter/reconnaissance aircraft
- National origin: United Kingdom
- Manufacturer: Sopwith Aviation Company
- Status: Prototype
- Number built: 2

History
- First flight: 19 September 1918
- Developed from: Sopwith Bulldog

The Sopwith Buffalo was a British armoured fighter/reconnaissance aircraft of the First World War. A single-engined biplane, two examples of the Buffalo were built by Sopwith to carry out reconnaissance missions low over the trenches while protected against machine-gun fire from the ground, but no production followed, with the end of the war removing the need for such an aircraft.

== Development and design ==
In July 1918, the British Air Ministry requested Sopwith, who were already building the Sopwith Salamander armoured single-seat ground attack fighter, to build an armoured two-seat aircraft to carry out the dangerous contact patrol mission. This mission involved flying at low altitude over the battlefield to locate and keep in contact with attacking forces, therefore keeping commanders in touch with the progress of the battle. This exposed aircraft carrying out such missions to heavy small arms fire from enemy trenches, resulting in heavy casualties.

Sopwith's design, the 3F.2 Buffalo, was a single-engined tractor biplane, with its two-bay wooden wings taken from Sopwith's earlier Bulldog fighter. Like the Salamander, the forward fuselage was made out of armour plate, weighing about 750 lb (340 kg), with the bottom of the fuselage 0.315 in (8 mm) thick, with the sides and front of 0.179 in (5 mm) plate. The armoured box reached back to the observer's cockpit, protecting the crew together with the fuel tanks and pipes, the carburettor and the magnetos.

The first prototype flew on 19 September 1918, flying to France for evaluation in the field on 27 September. The second prototype, which had its armour extended further aft, flew in October. While tests showed that the Buffalo had good performance, and promised to be an excellent contact patrol aircraft, the end of the war ended plans for large scale production. The two prototypes were sent to No. 43 Squadron, serving with the British Army of Occupation at Bickendorf near Cologne, Germany, but were quickly damaged in crashes.

== Operators ==
Australia

- Australian Flying Corps
  - No. 4 Squadron AFC – One Buffalo was attached to No. 4 Squadron, it was used for tests and trials during October 1918.

United Kingdom

- Royal Air Force
  - No. 43 Squadron RAF

== Specifications ==
Data from British Aeroplanes 1914-18.

General characteristics

- Crew: Two
- Length: 23 ft 3 1/2 in (7.10 m)
- Wingspan: 36 ft 6 in (11.13 m)
- Height: 9 ft 6 in (2.90 m)
- Wing area: 326 sq ft (30.3 m^{2})
- Empty weight: 2,178 lb (988 kg)
- Gross weight: 3,071 lb (1,393 kg)
- Fuel capacity: 25 imp gal (30 US gal; 110 L)
- Powerplant: 1 × Bentley BR.2 9-cylinder rotary engine, 230 hp (170 kW)
- Propellers: 2-bladed, 8 ft 6 in (2.59 m) diameter

Performance

- Maximum speed: 114 mph (183 km/h, 99 kn) at 1,000 ft (300 m)
- Range: 275 mi (443 km, 239 nmi)
- Service ceiling: 9,000 ft (2,700 m)
- Time to altitude: 4 min 55 s to 3,000 ft (910 m)

Armament

- Guns:
  - 1× forward firing .303 in Vickers machine gun
  - 1× flexibly mounted Lewis gun in rear cockpit

== See also ==
Related development

- Sopwith Bulldog

Aircraft of comparable role, configuration, and era

- Sopwith Salamander
- Junkers J.I
- AEG J.I
- Albatros J.I
