= Clerget 11Eb =

World War I–era rotary aircraft engine

11Eb
- Type: Rotary engine
- National origin: France
- Manufacturer: Clerget-Blin
- First run: 1918
- Major applications: Sopwith Bulldog

The Clerget 11Eb was an 11-cylinder rotary aircraft engine of the World War I era designed by Pierre Clerget. Powering Sopwith types it was nominally rated at 200 horsepower (150 kW).

== Applications ==
- Sopwith Bulldog
- Sopwith Hippo
- Sopwith Salamander

== Specifications (Clerget 11Eb) ==
Data from Lumsden.

=== General characteristics ===
- Type: 11-cylinder air-cooled rotary engine
- Bore: 120 mm (4.72 in)
- Stroke: 190 mm (7.48 in)
- Displacement: 21.49 L (1,311.40 cu in)
- Dry weight: 232 kg (511 lb)

=== Components ===
- Valvetrain: 1 each overhead inlet and exhaust valves operated by pushrods and rockers
- Fuel system: Bloctube carburettor
- Fuel type: Gasoline with Castor oil lubricant
- Oil system: Castor oil mixed with fuel
- Cooling system: Air-cooled

=== Performance ===
- Power output: 160 kW (215 hp) at 1,300 rpm (maximum power)
- Specific power: 0.1639 hp/cu in (7.46 kW/L)
- Compression ratio: 5.1:1
- Specific fuel consumption: 0.518 L/kW/hour (0.68pt/hp/hour)
- Oil consumption: 0.0838 L/kW/hour (0.11 pt/hp/hour)
- Power-to-weight ratio: 0.694 kW/kg (0.421 hp/lb)

== See also ==
- Clerget aircraft engines

Comparable engines

- Gnome Monosoupape
- Le Rhône

Related lists

- List of aircraft engines
