= Sopwith Hippo =

British WW1 biplane fighter aircraft

Hippo

General information
- Type: Two-seat fighter aircraft
- National origin: United Kingdom
- Manufacturer: Sopwith Aviation Company
- Status: Prototype
- Number built: 2

History
- First flight: 13 September 1917

The Sopwith 3F.2 Hippo was a prototype British two-seat fighter aircraft of the First World War. It was a single-engined biplane with considerable negative stagger. It was not successful, the Bristol F.2 Fighter (already in production) being preferred by the Royal Flying Corps.

== Development and design ==
In the summer of 1917, the Sopwith Aviation Company designed a two-seat fighter aircraft, the 3F.2 Hippo, possibly to replace the Sopwith 1½ Strutter in French service. While the British Air Board did not place an order for the Hippo, it did grant Sopwith a licence to allow it to build prototypes as a private venture. The Hippo was designed to give the best possible view to the pilot and gunner, which dictated the aircraft's shape. Its two-bay wings had heavy (2 ft 3 in (0.69 m)) negative stagger, with the pilot sitting ahead of the upper wing and the gunner sitting behind the rear spar of the upper wing. The fuselage filled the gap between the wings, with the crew's heads level with the upper wing and cutouts in the wing's forward and trailing edges for the pilot and gunner. The pilot was armed with two synchronised Vickers machine guns, while the observer was provided with two Lewis guns on a rocking pillar mount. It was powered by a Clerget 11 eleven-cylinder rotary engine, chosen as it was not heavily used.

The first prototype Hippo flew on 13 September 1917. When tested, it was found to have sluggish controls and poorer performance than the Bristol F.2 Fighter which was already in service. Despite these results, which meant that there was little chance of it being built for the Royal Flying Corps, Sopwith rebuilt the Hippo, with increased dihedral on the upper wing, reduced wing stagger and an enlarged tailfin. The crude rocking pillar mount for the gunner's Lewis guns was replaced by a more conventional Scarff ring mounting a single Lewis gun. The rebuilt prototype flew in April 1918, with a second prototype following in June. No further production followed.^{[a]}

== Specifications ==
Data from British Aeroplanes 1914–18

General characteristics

- Crew: Two
- Length: 24 ft 6 in (7.47 m)
- Wingspan: 38 ft 9 in (11.81 m)
- Height: 9 ft 4 in (2.84 m)
- Wing area: 340 sq ft (32 m^{2})
- Empty weight: 1,481 lb (672 kg)
- Gross weight: 2,590 lb (1,175 kg)
- Fuel capacity: 40.5 imp gal (48.6 US gal; 184 L)
- Powerplant: 1 × Clerget 11Eb 11-cylinder rotary engine, 200 hp (150 kW)

Performance

- Maximum speed: 115.5 mph (185.9 km/h, 100.4 kn) at 10,000 ft (3,000 m)
- Service ceiling: 17,000 ft (5,200 m)
- Rate of climb: 1,000 ft/min (5.1 m/s)
- Time to altitude: 13 min 25 s to 10,000 ft (3,000 m)

Armament

- Guns:
  - 2× forward firing .303 in Vickers guns
  - 1× .303 in Lewis gun on Scarff ring in rear cockpit

== See also ==
Aircraft of comparable role, configuration, and era

- Bristol F.2 Fighter
- Sopwith Bulldog

== Notes ==
^{a} Some sources suggest that, rather than a rebuilt first prototype, that the Hippo with reduced stagger was a new aircraft.
