= Vashon James Wheeler =

Royal Air Force officer (1898–1944)

- Born: 16 September 1898; Ludlow, Shropshire, England
- Died: 23 March 1944 (aged 45); Near Bad Schwalbach, Germany
- Burial place: British Military Cemetery, Durnbach, Bavaria
- Spouse: Josephine Hermione Wheeler
- Relatives: Admiral Sir James Vashon (great-grandfather)
- Military career
- Allegiance: United Kingdom
- Branch: British Army; Royal Air Force
- Service years: 1916–1920; 1939–1944
- Rank: Wing Commander
- Nickname: "OlePopp"
- Commands: No. 207 Squadron RAF; RAF Honiley; No. 157 Squadron RAF; RAF West Malling; No. 219 Squadron RAF
- Conflicts: First World War; Russian Civil War; Allied intervention in the Russian Civil War; North Russia intervention; Second World War; European air campaign †
- Awards: Military Cross & Bar; Distinguished Flying Cross & Bar; Order of Saint Stanislaus (Russia)

Wing Commander Vashon James "PK" Wheeler, MC & Bar, DFC & Bar (16 September 1898 – 23 March 1944) was a British Army and Royal Air Force officer who served as an infantry officer in both the First World War and the North Russia intervention, and then as a fighter and bomber pilot in the Second World War.

== Early life ==
Vashon James Wheeler was born in September 1898 near Ludlow, Shropshire. His father, James Volant Wheeler, a landowner and barrister, named his son Vashon after his great-grandfather Admiral Sir James Vashon. His mother was Sybil Grace Wheeler (née Tyrrwhit). Vashon received his early education from a private school in Bournemouth before moving on to the prestigious Eton College. During his time at Eton, the young Wheeler enrolled in the school Officer Training Corps unit and received his first taste of military life. He evidently enjoyed the military way as following the annual OTC summer camp of 1915, Wheeler went missing and was eventually tracked down by his father and housemaster at the Guards Depot Caterham, Surrey. He had lied about his age in order to enlist as a soldier in the British Army. He was soon discharged in order to resume his studies.

== First World War ==
Wheeler did not have to wait long to come of age and soon left Eton for the Royal Military College, Sandhurst, where, due to the expediencies of war, he completed a much shortened course of officer training. He was subsequently commissioned as a second lieutenant into the Rifle Brigade (The Prince Consort's Own) on 16 August 1916. He soon shipped out to the Western Front where he served with the 1st Battalion of his regiment, which at that time was part of the 11th Brigade, 4th Division. Wheeler was wounded on three separate occasions, although not seriously. At the time of the armistice of 11 November 1918 he had been promoted to captain.

== North Russia intervention ==
Following the armistice Wheeler decided to remain in the army but reverted to his substantive rank of lieutenant. He transferred to The Royal Fusiliers and became a platoon commander in the 45th Battalion. This unit was sent to Russia to support the anti communist White Movement in the Russian Civil War. Wheeler landed at Arkhangelsk with his battalion on 6 June 1919 and was soon in action. The 45th Battalion war diary records 230 enemy killed, 350 enemy wounded and 1200 enemy captured for the loss of only 2 officers and 5 men from the unit between June and the end of August. The tide soon turned however, and the battalion was involved in some vicious fighting with the communist forces in early September before being evacuated on 10 September. It was in this short time space that Wheeler distinguished himself repeatedly in combat, gaining two awards for gallantry in the space of seven days. He received the Military Cross for an action on 2 September and shortly afterwards was awarded a Bar to his Military Cross for collective actions on 7, 8 and 9 September. The London Gazette citations for the awards were published on 21 January 1920 and read as follows:

Military Cross

Lt. Vashon James Wheeler,. Rifle Bde.,.attd. 45th Bn., Royal Fus, At Vosnesenskoe he was in charge of a flank party in a raid on 2 September 1919. He was surrounded on three sides by the enemy at close quarters. He acted with great courage and determination, and with his small party drove off the enemy and inflicted severe loss on him.

Bar to Military Cross

Lt. (A./Capt.) Vashon James Wheeler, M.C., Rif. Brig, attd. 45th Bn, R. Fus. He did excellent work with his patrols on the 7, 8 and 9 September 1919, always gaining touch with the enemy. He also led his platoon with great gallantry and dash in the raid on Kodema on 8 September, and six hours later led them in a most successful counter-attack.

Wheeler was also honoured by the White Movement for his efforts, receiving the Order of Saint Stanislaus. Wheeler paid for these awards with his own pound of flesh, losing two fingers on his left hand due to a painful wound received during the fighting. By the end of the campaign Wheeler had again been promoted to captain.

== Inter-war years ==
After returning from Russia, Wheeler spent a further 10 months in the army before deciding to leave for pastures new in July 1920, he was granted a small disability pension in compensation for the loss of his two fingers. Wheeler spent the next 10 years of his life in a variety of interesting jobs overseas. He spent a year working in the office of an Indian tea plantation, spent time labouring on an Australian sheep farm and took odd jobs in Rhodesia, eventually taking ownership of his own sheep farm in New Zealand. Wheeler agreed to the sale of this farm when he was offered a very favourable price by a gentleman who wanted a find a place for his son to live, some place where he could keep a low profile. The gentleman's son had supposedly been accused of committing "...a rather nasty crime".

After returning home to England, Wheeler decided to spend a portion of the proceeds gained from the sale of his farm on a course of flying lessons at Heston Aerodrome. The missing fingers on his left hand evidently posed no hindrance as he soon gained his pilots licence and eventually gained a commercial pilots B Licence. This allowed him to fly passengers and make a living from flying as an airline pilot, this he did for the duration of the 1930s.

== Second World War ==
By 1939 Wheeler was working for an Egyptian-based airline, on the outbreak of war he immediately returned home to England with the intention of joining the Royal Air Force. Knowing that his age (41) would likely bar him from any operational flying role, he decided to utilise the same trick that he had used so successfully back in 1915, he lied about it. This resulted in his application being successful, and he was commissioned as a pilot officer in the Royal Air Force Volunteer Reserve in January 1940.

=== First posting ===
For his first posting he spent four months acting as the resident staff pilot to a Bombing and Gunnery School in Wales, duties included towing targets, transporting senior officers and performing other routine flights. Wheeler soon tired of this unexciting work and by April 1940 he had applied for and was granted a transfer to No. 271 Squadron RAF which flew the Handley Page Harrow and Bristol Bombay in the transport role. At that time the squadron was heavily involved in supporting the British Expeditionary Force in France, and subsequently assisting in its evacuation after the German Blitzkrieg in May 1940.

=== Coastal Command ===
In July 1940 Wheeler was posted to Coastal Command and No. 500 Squadron RAF at RAF Detling, flying the Avro Anson in the general reconnaissance role. Over the next four months he flew the Anson on 22 convoy escort and anti U-Boat patrols over the English Channel and the North Sea. During this time he had two memorable encounters with the Luftwaffe. On the first he managed to successfully chase a Junkers Ju 88 away from the convoy he was escorting, on the second he narrowly escaped death after being attacked by several Messerschmitt Bf 110 heavy fighters.

=== Fighter Command ===
In November 1940 Pilot Officer Wheeler was posted to Fighter Command and No. 85 Squadron RAF at RAF Gravesend, which at that time was a night fighter unit under the command of Squadron Leader Peter Townsend. Wheeler flew 71 combat missions with No. 85 Squadron and flew the Hawker Hurricane, Douglas Havoc and Bristol Beaufighter during this time. He claimed two aerial victories whilst flying the Douglas Havoc with 85 Sqn. A Heinkel He 111 on 6 May 1941 and a Junkers Ju 88 two nights later on 8 May 1941. Both combats were over the sea off Felixstowe.

In September 1941, the by then Acting Squadron Leader Wheeler was awarded the Distinguished Flying Cross. His London Gazette citation reads:

Acting Squadron Leader Vashon James WHEELER, M.C. (76594), Royal Air Force Volunteer Reserve, No. 85 Squadron. This officer has performed excellent operational work' during a long period, including convoy patrols and reconnaissance missions over enemy territory. He has also carried out a large number of operational flying hours by night. One night in May, 1941, Squadron Leader Wheeler attacked and probably destroyed a Heinkel 111. The following night he damaged a Junkers 88, setting its port engine on fire. Throughout, Squadron Leader Wheeler has shown great devotion to duty and an intense desire to engage the enemy.

By December 1941 Wheeler was promoted to acting wing commander and took command of No. 219 Squadron RAF at RAF Tangmere flying the Bristol Beaufighter. From June 1942 he was 'rested', taking the post of Station Commander at RAF West Malling until Wing Commander Cathcart Wight-Boycott assumed the role in December 1942.

On 29 December 1942 Wheeler assumed command of No. 157 Squadron RAF then at RAF Castle Camps flying the de Havilland Mosquito NF MkII in the night fighter role. Wheeler completed 29 defensive patrols with the squadron before flying the units first ever offensive Intruder operation on 23 March 1943 in the Paris area. He went on to fly a further 14 Intruder missions before his time with 157 Sqn came to an end in August 1943. Although he never managed to increase his tally of enemy aircraft further, he had some success at destroying ground targets such as trains during these missions. In recognition of his efforts with 157 Sqn he was awarded a bar to his DFC in September 1943, his London Gazette citation reads:

Acting Wing Commander Vashon James WHEELER, M.C., D.F.C. (76594) Royal Air Force Volunteer Reserve, No. 157 Squadron. This officer has led the squadron on very many sorties during which locomotives and other targets on the ground have been attacked with telling effect. Much of the success achieved can be attributed to Wing Commander Wheeler's inspiring leadership and skill. His courageous example has been worthy of great praise.

Wing Commander Wheeler was then posted as Station Commander to RAF Honiley in Warwickshire. This was a night fighter station which at that time hosted No.63 Operational Training Unit (OTU). This OTU instructed pilots on Airborne Interception techniques using the Bristol Beaufighter and Bristol Blenheim.

=== Bomber Command ===
Wheeler soon grew frustrated when it became apparent that Fighter Command was intent on keeping him desk bound due to his advanced years (45). Following a rather one sided argument with his No. 9 Group RAF Commander, Air Vice Marshal Leslie Norman Hollinghurst, Wheeler decided to offer his services to RAF Bomber Command instead. As the bombing campaign against Germany was reaching its peak, his services were gratefully received.

Following some conversion training and a short spell with No. 20 OTU at RAF Lossiemouth to pick up a crew, Wheeler took command of No. 207 Squadron RAF flying the Avro Lancaster from RAF Spilsby in Lincolnshire on 26 February 1944. Wheeler, in his typical lead from the front manner, flew with the squadron on its very next mission. This was a raid on Stuttgart on 1 March 1944. And so he continued, unlike some squadron commanders who only flew on the easy raids, Wheeler flew on every single mission that 207 Sqn was tasked for. This did not go unnoticed by the aircrews, Navigator Flight Sergeant Jack Briggs sums up the general feeling towards Wheeler at this time:

Wing Commander was a fantastic character for a crowd of young lads like us, going on every trip like he did. It was the epitome of leadership but he was still one of the lads; he was all part of what was going on, not standing on the end of the runway seeing us off like a normal CO. He gave us tremendous confidence.

== Final flight ==
Artwork depicting Avro Lancaster ME666, as flown by Wing Commander Wheeler on his final mission.

Wing Commander Wheeler took off on the night of 22/23 March 1944 in Lancaster serial number ME666, coded EM-A, to join a raid against Frankfurt. It was to be his 158th operational mission. Arriving at the target area a little ahead of schedule Wheeler began flying circuits until the Pathfinder force had marked the target. Just as the target markers were falling, Wheelers Lancaster was hit by a large calibre flak shell. Immediately engine power was lost and some of the control surfaces became unresponsive. Struggling to maintain control, Wheeler ordered the crew to bale out, only the navigator, rear gunner and mid-upper gunner managed to escape the stricken aircraft before one of the wings fell off and the aircraft exploded. The wreckage came down in woodland near to the small town of Bad Schwalbach, about 25 miles (40 km) west of Frankfurt. The bodies of Wing Commander Wheeler and his crew are buried in the British Military Cemetery at Durnbach in Bavaria.
