= Sopwith Rhino =

British WW1 triplane bomber aircraft

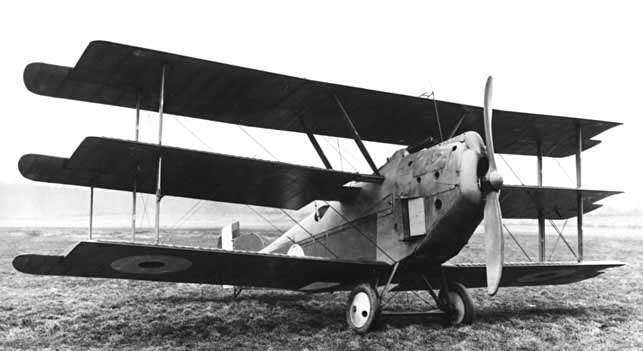
- Prototype with balanced ailerons

General information
- Type: Triplane bomber
- National origin: United Kingdom
- Manufacturer: Sopwith Aviation Company
- Number built: 2

History
- First flight: 1917

The Sopwith 2B2 Rhino was a British two-seat triplane bomber designed and built by Sopwith Aviation Company as a private venture. The Rhino was powered by a 230-horsepower (172 kW) Galloway Adriatic inline piston engine. Only two aircraft were built and the type did not enter production.

== Development and design ==
In mid-1917, the Sopwith Aviation Company prepared a design for a single-engine bomber aircraft, the Sopwith Rhino. As it did not match any official specification, it received no orders from the Royal Flying Corps or Royal Naval Air Service, but Sopwith was granted a licence to allow it to build two prototypes as private ventures.

The Rhino was a single bay tractor triplane with ailerons fitted to all three sets of wings. It had a deep fuselage, which accommodated an internal bomb-bay capable of carrying 450 lb (205 kg) of bombs in a self-contained pack that could be loaded with bombs separately and then winched into the aircraft to allow rapid re-arming. Defensive armament was a synchronised Vickers machine gun firing through the propeller disc, while the observer in the rear cockpit had a Lewis gun on a pillar mount. It was powered by a 230 hp (172 kW) BHP inline engine driving a two-bladed propeller, cooled by radiators each side of the fuselage.

The first prototype made its maiden flight at Brooklands in October 1917, with initial testing showing it to be nose heavy and subject to engine overheating. The second prototype, which differed in having the primitive pillar mounting for the observer's gun replaced by a more modern scarff ring, joined it for official testing at Martlesham Heath in February and March 1918. Performance was unimpressive, with the aircraft having a poor ceiling and low speed, and it was rejected as a service type. The two Rhinos were then used as testbeds for development of propellers.

== Specifications ==
Data from British Aeroplanes 1914–18

General characteristics

- Crew: 2
- Length: 27 ft 8 in (8.43 m) ^{[a]}
- Wingspan: 33 ft 0 in (10.06 m)
- Height: 10 ft 11 in (3.33 m)
- Wing area: 545 sq ft (50.6 m^{2})
- Empty weight: 2,185 lb (991 kg)
- Gross weight: 3,590 lb (1,628 kg)
- Fuel capacity: 60 imp gal (273 L)
- Powerplant: 1 × Galloway Adriatic six-cylinder, water-cooled inline engine, 230 hp (170 kW)

Performance

- Maximum speed: 103 mph (166 km/h, 90 kn) at 10,000 ft (3,050 m), 114 mph (184 km/h, 99 kn) at sea level
- Range: 409 mi (655 km, 363 nmi) approximate values
- Endurance: 3 h 45 min
- Service ceiling: 12,000 ft (3,700 m)
- Time to altitude: 24 min 50 s to 10,000 ft (3,050 m)

Armament

- Guns: 1 × fixed, forward firing 0.303 in (7.7 mm) Vickers machine gun and 1 × flexibly mounted Lewis gun in rear cockpit
- Bombs: 450 lb (205 kg) bombs in removable "bomb pack" carried in internal bomb-bay

== Bibliography ==
- Bruce, J. M. (1957). British Aeroplanes 1914–18. Putnam.
- Mason, Francis K (1994). The British Bomber since 1914. Putnam. ISBN 0-85177-861-5.
- Robertson, Bruce (1970). Sopwith—The Man and His Aircraft. Air Review. ISBN 0-900435-15-1.
