= Sopwith Swallow =

British WW1 parasol monoplane fighter aircraft

Swallow
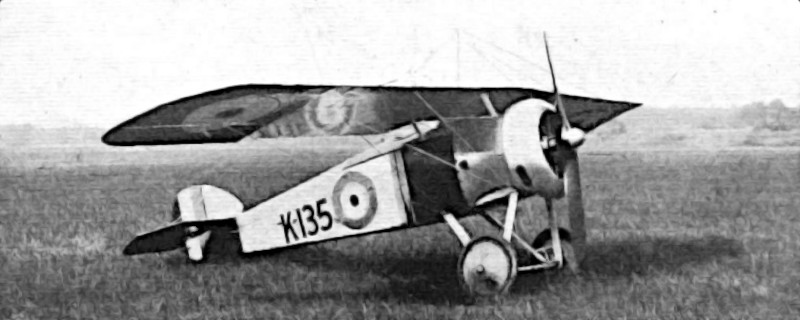

General information
- Type: Fighter aircraft
- National origin: United Kingdom
- Manufacturer: Sopwith Aviation Company
- Number built: 1 (Scooter) + 1 (Swallow)

History
- First flight: October 1918
- Developed from: Sopwith Camel

The Sopwith Swallow was a British parasol wing fighter aircraft of the First World War. A single example was built, but it saw no production, offering no performance advantages over contemporary biplanes.

== Design and development ==
In June 1918, the Sopwith Aviation Company flew an unarmed parasol monoplane derivative of the Sopwith Camel, the Sopwith Monoplane No. 1, also known as the Sopwith Scooter. It used a normal Camel fuselage, with the wing mounted just above the fuselage, with a very small gap. The wing was braced using RAF-wire (streamlined bracing wires) to a pyramid shaped cabane above the wing. It was powered by a single 130 hp (97 kW) Clerget 9B rotary engine.

The Scooter, which was used as a runabout and aerobatic mount by Sopwith test pilot Harry Hawker, demonstrated excellent manoeuvrability, and formed the basis of a fighter derivative, originally the Monoplane No. 2, and later known as the Sopwith Swallow.

Like the Scooter, the Swallow used the fuselage of a Camel, but it had a larger, slightly swept, wing of greater wingspan and area, which was mounted higher above the fuselage to allow the pilot to access the two synchronised Vickers machine guns. It was powered by a 110 hp (82 kW) Le Rhône engine.

== Operational history ==
The Swallow made its maiden flight in October 1918, and was delivered to RAF Martlesham Heath on 28 October 1918 for official testing. One possible role for the Swallow was as a shipboard fighter. Engine problems delayed testing of the Swallow, but when these problems were resolved, the Swallow proved to have lower performance than Le Rhône-powered Camels, and was discarded soon after testing was completed in May 1919.

The Scooter remained in use, and was given the civil registration K-135 in May 1919 (soon changed to G-EACZ). It was sold to Harry Hawker in April 1921, but was placed into storage when Hawker was killed in July. It was refurbished in 1925, and was used for aerobatic displays and for racing until 1927, when it was scrapped.

== Specifications (Swallow) ==
Data from War Planes of the First World War: Volume Three Fighters

General characteristics

- Crew: 1
- Length: 18 ft 9 in (5.72 m)
- Wingspan: 28 ft 10 in (8.79 m)
- Height: 10 ft 2 in (3.10 m)
- Wing area: 160 sq ft (15 m^{2})
- Empty weight: 889 lb (403 kg)
- Gross weight: 1,420 lb (644 kg)
- Powerplant: 1 × Le Rhône 9J nine-cylinder rotary engine, 110 hp (82 kW)

Performance

- Maximum speed: 113.5 mph (182.7 km/h, 98.6 kn) at 10,000 ft (3,050 m)
- Service ceiling: 18,500 ft (5,600 m)
- Time to altitude: 5 min 35 s to 6,500 ft (1,980 m)

Armament

- Guns: 2 × .303 in Vickers machine guns

== See also ==
Related development

- Sopwith Camel

Aircraft of comparable role, configuration, and era

- Fokker D.VIII
- Morane-Saulnier AI
