= National Aircraft Factory =

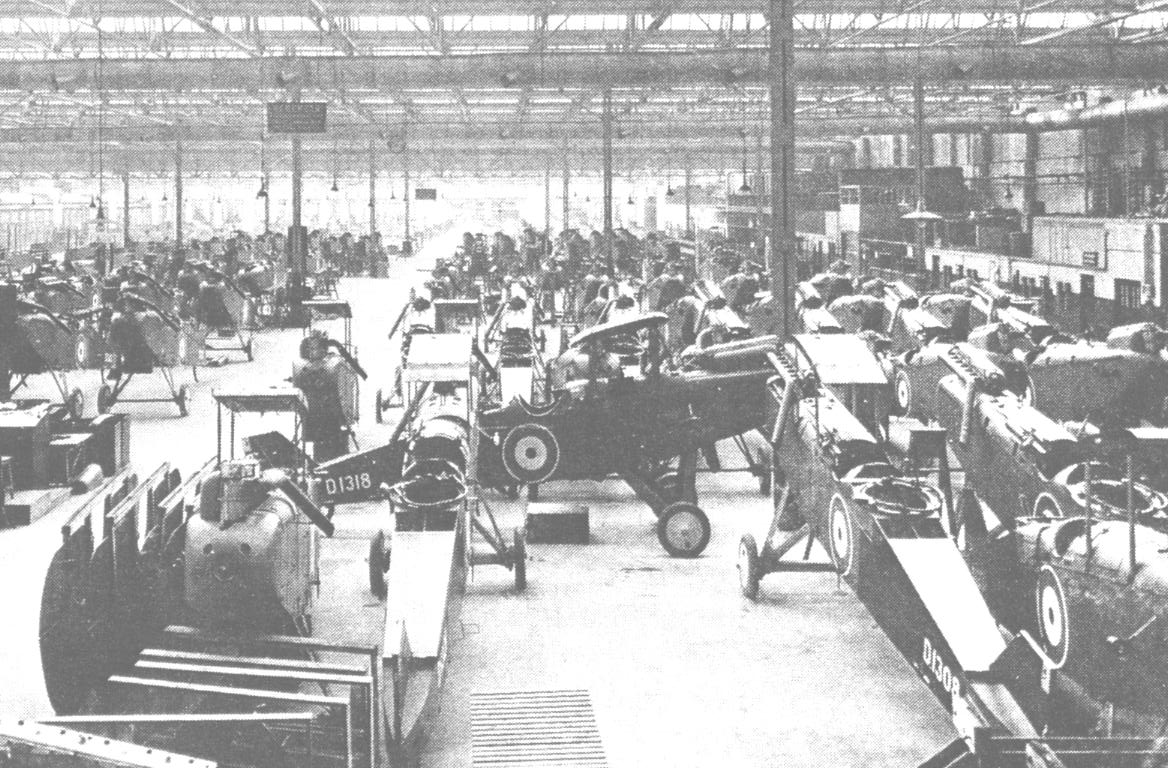
The erecting area of the National Aircraft Factory No.2 in late 1918 with de Havilland DH.9s under assembly

During World War I, the importance of military control of the air became evident. The United Kingdom government therefore sought to significantly increase aircraft manufacturing capacity. In 1917 the Ministry of Munitions, then headed by Winston Churchill, commissioned the construction of National Aircraft Factories to significantly boost the rate and scale of production.

== Four factories were commissioned ==
- National Aircraft Factory No. 1 at Waddon in Croydon, producing de Havilland DH.9
- National Aircraft Factory No. 2 at Heaton Chapel, Stockport, managed by Crossley Motors and producing de Havilland DH.9
- National Aircraft Factory No. 3 at Aintree, Merseyside, operated by Cunard to produce Bristol F.2 Fighters
- Ham near Kingston upon Thames, Surrey – leased and operated by Sopwith Aviation and producing Snipe, Dolphin and Salamander fighter planes. This, confusingly, was also referred to as National Aircraft Factory No. 2
