= No. 157 Squadron RAF =

Defunct flying squadron of the Royal Air Force

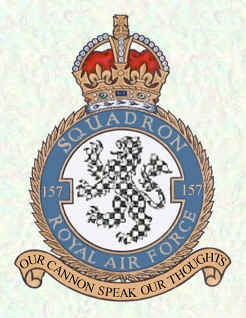
- Squadron badge
- Active: 14 Jul 1918 – 1 Feb 1919; 15 Dec 1941 – 16 Aug 1945
- Country: United Kingdom
- Branch: Royal Air Force
- Motto: Our cannon speak our thoughts

Commanders
- Notable commanders: Vashon James 'Pop' Wheeler

Insignia
- Squadron Badge heraldry: A lion rampant chequy "The lion in the squadron's badge denotes fighting power and the black and white check the squadron's day and night capability"
- Squadron Codes: RS (Dec 1941 - Aug 1945)

No. 157 Squadron RAF was a Royal Air Force Squadron active as a night fighter unit in the Second World War.

== History ==
=== Formation and First World War ===
No. 157 Squadron Royal Air Force formed on 14 July 1918 at RAF Upper Heyford and was eventually equipped with Sopwith TF.2 Salamander aircraft for ground support duties, but disbanded on 1 February 1919 without becoming operational.

=== Reformation in Second World War ===
The squadron reformed in December 1941 at RAF Debden as a night fighter unit and was eventually equipped with the latest Mosquito night-fighter aircraft at RAF Castle Camps. The squadron flew patrols over East Anglia and by July 1943, after moving to RAF Hunsdon, began intruder attacks on German fighter bases with its new Mosquito Mk VIs. In November 1943, it moved to RAF Predannack in Cornwall, closer to the German bases. In March 194, it moved to RAF Valley and flew defensive patrols over the Irish Sea. In May 1944, it moved back to East Anglia, receiving Mosquito Mk XIXs and supporting bomber streams as part of No. 100 Group RAF. It disbanded on 16 August 1945 at RAF Swannington.

== Aircraft operated ==
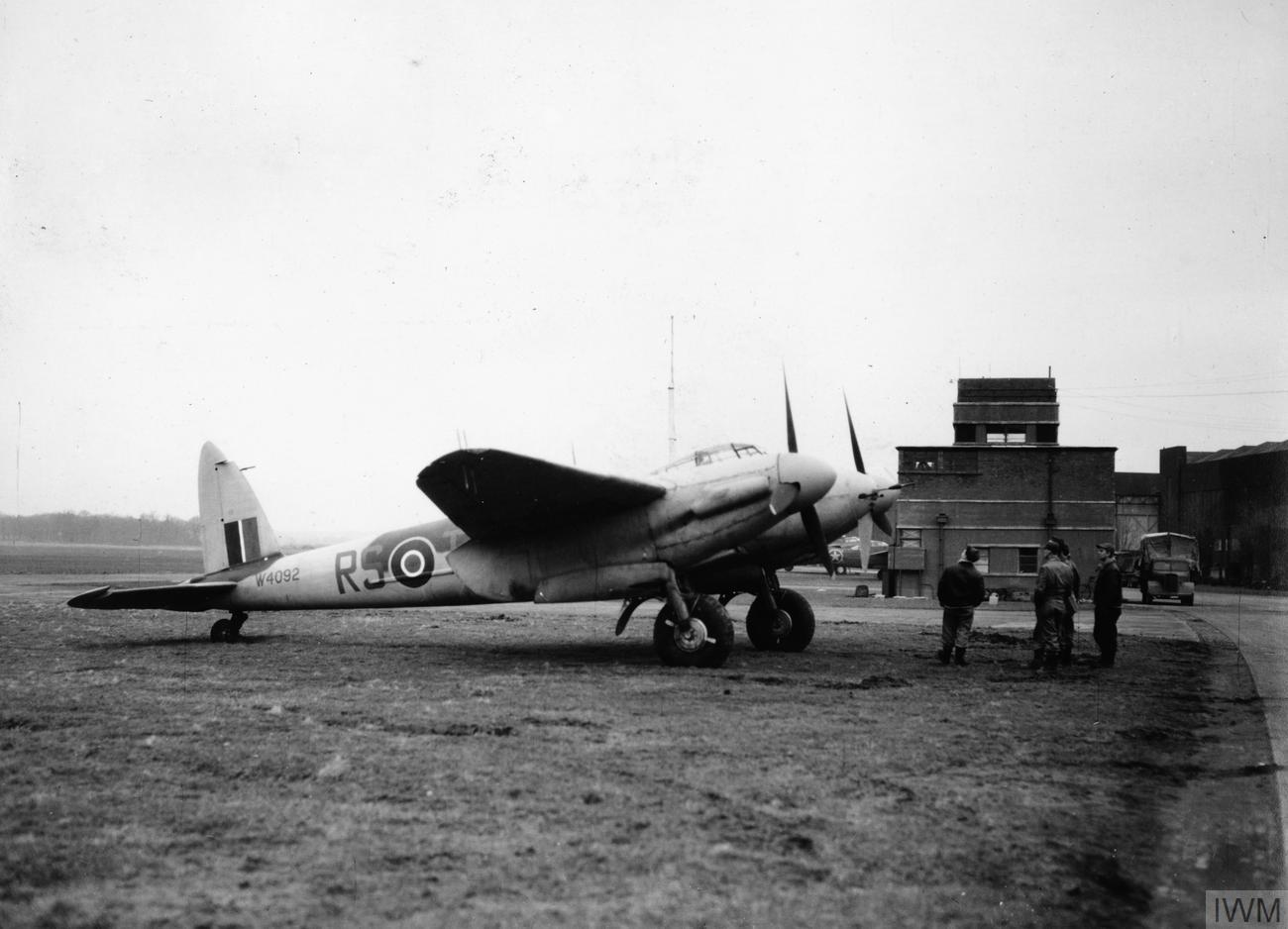
A No. 157 Squadron Mosquito NF.Mk.II at RAF Predannack

Aircraft operated by No. 157 Squadron RAF
From	To	Aircraft	Variant
November 1918	February 1919	Sopwith Salamander	
January 1942	June 1944	de Havilland Mosquito	Mk.II
July 1943	April 1944	de Havilland Mosquito	Mk.VI
May 1944	May 1945	de Havilland Mosquito	Mk.XIX
February 1945	August 1945	de Havilland Mosquito	Mk.XXX

== Squadron bases ==
Bases and airfields used by No. 157 Squadron RAF
From	To	Base	Remark
14 July 1918	1 February 1919	RAF Upper Heyford, Oxfordshire	
13 December 1941	17 December 1941	RAF Debden, Essex	
17 December 1941	15 March 1943	RAF Castle Camps, Cambridgeshire	
15 March 1943	13 May 1943	RAF Bradwell Bay, Essex	
13 May 1943	9 November 1943	RAF Hunsdon, Hertfordshire	
9 November 1943	26 March 1944	RAF Predannack, Cornwall	
26 March 1944	7 May 1944	RAF Valley, Anglesey, Wales	
7 May 1944	21 July 1944	RAF Swannington, Norfolk	
21 July 1944	28 August 1944	RAF West Malling, Kent	
28 August 1944	16 August 1945	RAF Swannington, Norfolk	

== Commanding officers ==
Officers commanding No. 157 Squadron RAF
December 1941	January 1943	W/Cdr. R.G. Slade
January 1943	August 1943	W/Cdr. V.J. Wheeler, MC, DFC
August 1943	March 1944	W/Cdr. J.A. Mackie
March 1944	June 1944	W/Cdr. H.D.U. Denison
June 1944	September 1944	W/Cdr. W.K. Davison
September 1944	August 1945	W/Cdr. K.H.P. Beauchamp, DSO, DFC
