= Sopwith 1½ Strutter =

British WW1 biplane fighter, bomber and reconnaissance aircraft

Sopwith 1 1/2 Strutter
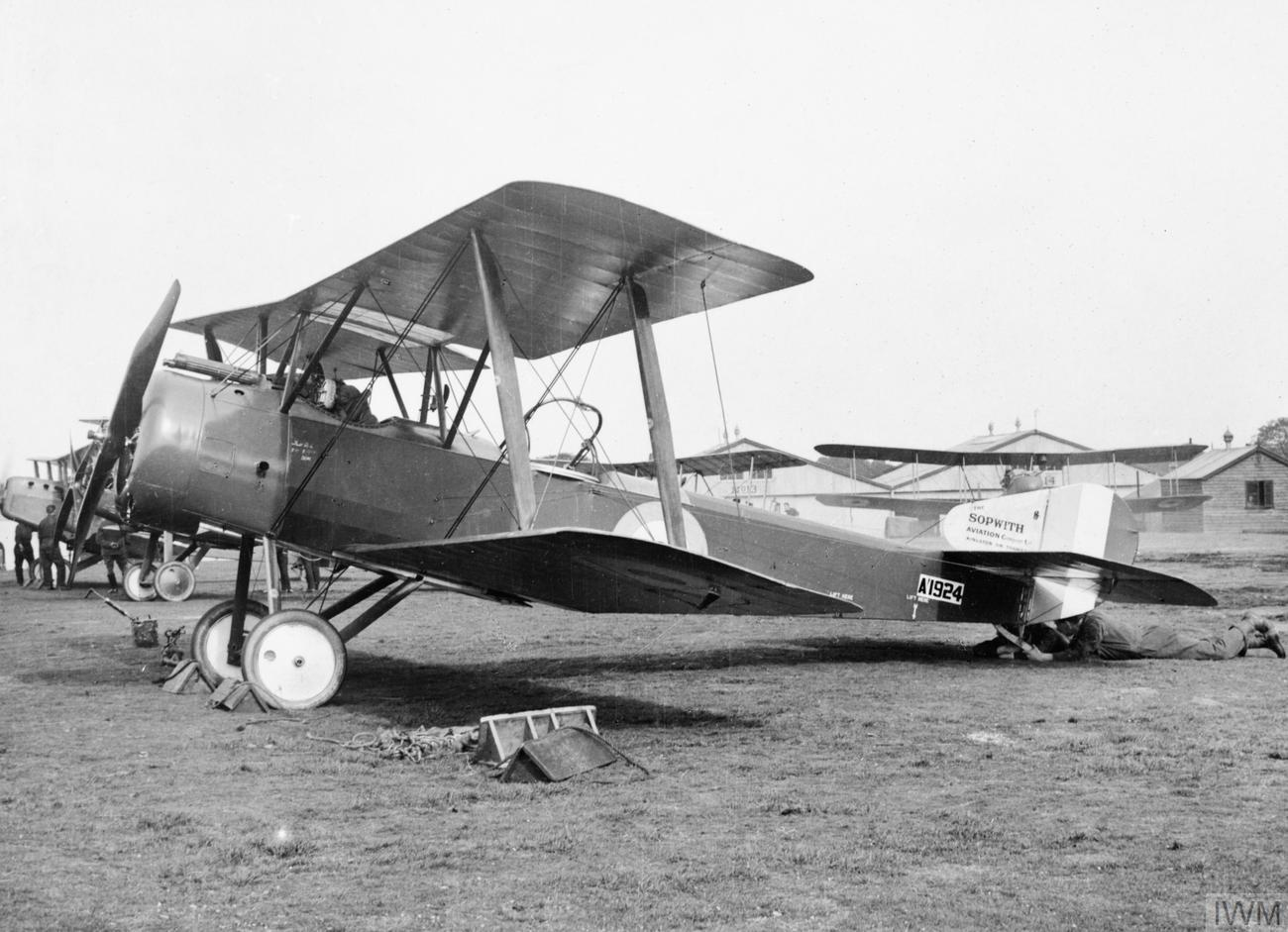

General information
- Type: Biplane general purpose aircraft
- National origin: United Kingdom
- Manufacturer: Sopwith Aviation Company
- Primary users: Royal Naval Air Service Royal Flying Corps; Aéronautique Militaire
- Number built: 4,500 France; 1,439 Great Britain

History
- Introduction date: April 1916
- First flight: December 1915

The Sopwith 1 1/2 Strutter is a British single- or two-seat multi-role biplane aircraft of the First World War. It was the first British two-seat tractor fighter and the first British aircraft to enter service with a synchronised machine gun. It was given the name 1 1/2 Strutter because of the long and short cabane struts that supported the top wing. The type was operated by both British air services and was in widespread but lacklustre service with the French Aéronautique Militaire.

== Design and development ==
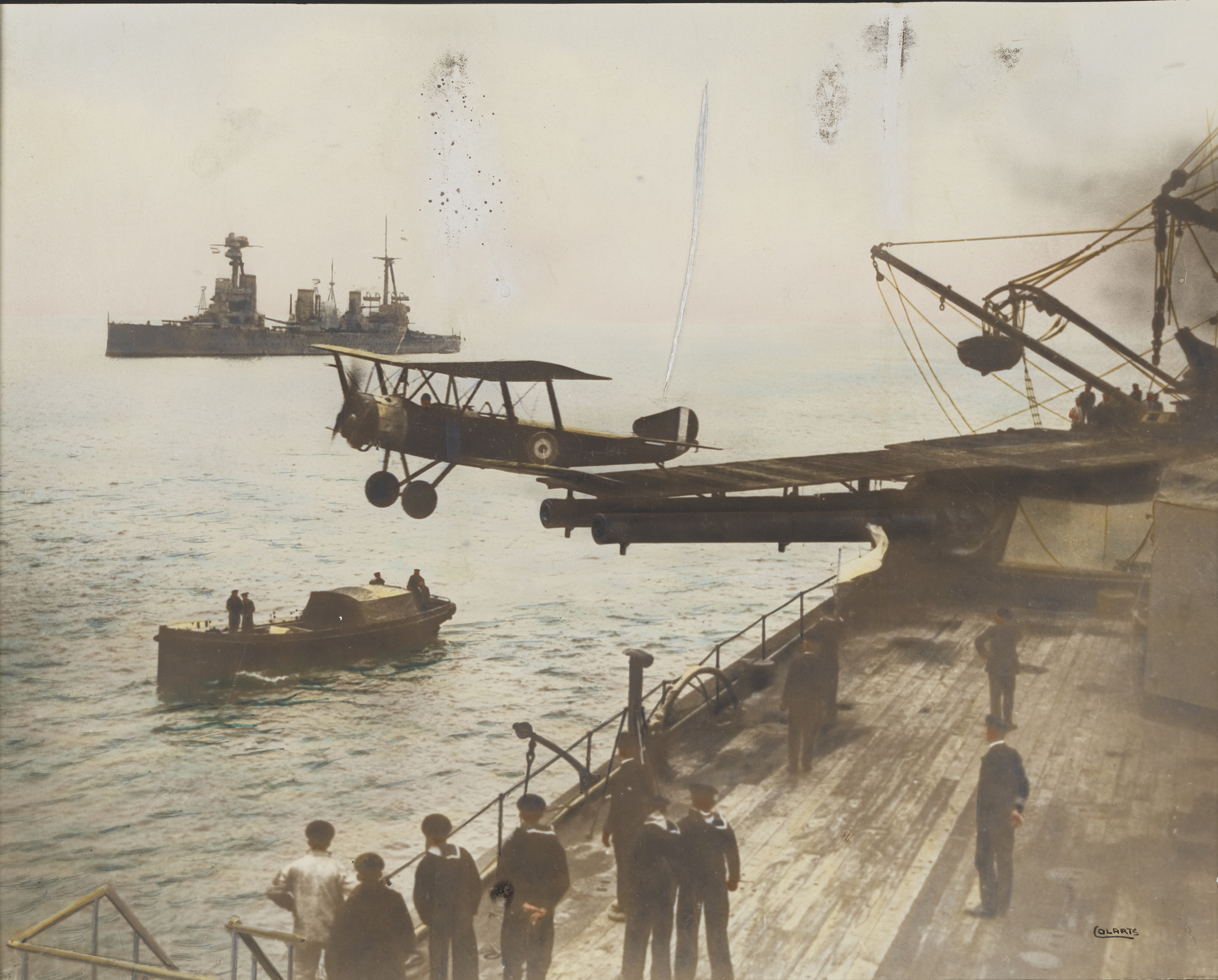
Sopwith 1 1/2 Strutter biplane aircraft taking off from a platform built on top of HMAS Australia's midships 'Q' turret. 1918

In December 1914, the Sopwith Aviation Company designed a small, two-seat biplane powered by an 80 hp (60 kW) Gnome rotary engine, which became known as the "Sigrist Bus" after Fred Sigrist, the Sopwith works manager. The Sigrist Bus first flew on 5 June 1915 and although it set a new British altitude record on the day of its first flight, only one was built, serving as a company runabout.

The Sigrist Bus formed the basis for a new, larger, fighter aircraft, the Sopwith LCT (Land Clerget Tractor), designed by Herbert Smith and powered by a 110 hp (82 kW) Clerget engine. Like the Sigrist Bus, each of the upper wings (there was no true centre section) was connected to the fuselage by a pair of short (half) struts and a pair of longer struts, forming a "W" when viewed from the front; this giving rise to the aircraft's popular nickname of the 1 1/2 Strutter. The first prototype was ready in mid-December 1915, undergoing official testing in January 1916.

The 1 1/2 Strutter was of conventional wire-braced, wood and fabric construction. The pilot and gunner sat in widely separated tandem cockpits, with the pilot in front, giving the gunner a good field of fire for his Lewis gun. The aircraft had a variable-incidence tailplane that could be adjusted by the pilot in flight and airbrakes under the lower wings to reduce landing distance.

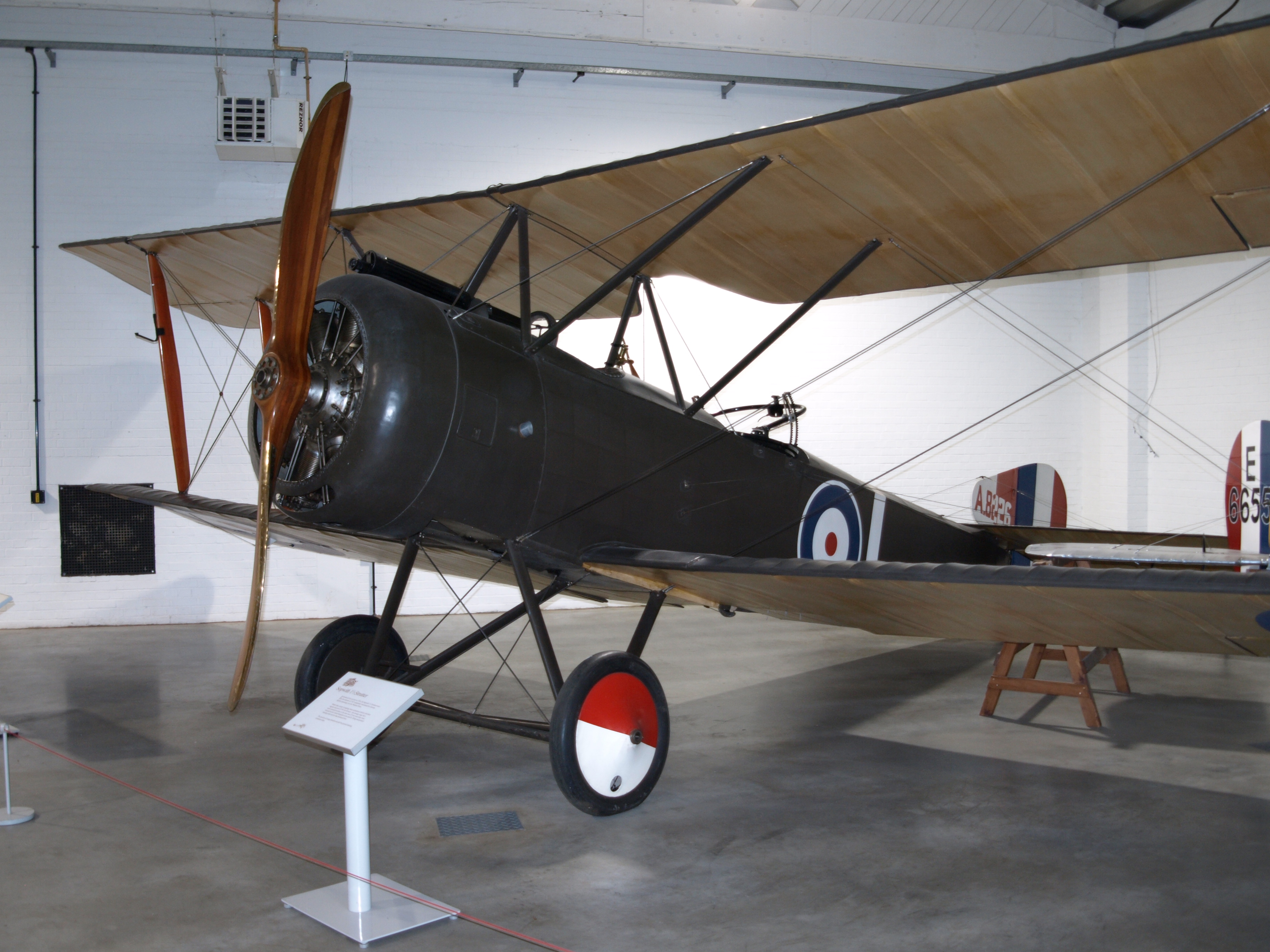
A preserved Sopwith 1 1/2 Strutter at the RAF Museum, London, showing the W-form pairs of "1 1/2" struts that gave the aeroplane its name, and the centrally-mounted Vickers machine gun

The Vickers-Challenger synchronisation gear was put into production for the Royal Flying Corps (RFC) in December 1915 and in a few weeks, a similar order for the Scarff-Dibovski gear was placed for the RNAS. Early production 1 1/2 Strutters were fitted with one or the other of these gears for the fixed .303-in Vickers machine gun; due to a shortage of the new gears some early aircraft were built with only the observer's gun. Later aircraft were either fitted with the Ross or the Sopwith-Kauper gears. No early mechanical synchronisation gear was reliable and it was not uncommon for propellers to be damaged or shot away.

The Scarff ring mounting was also new and production was at first slower than that of the aircraft requiring them. Various makeshift Lewis mountings as well as the older Nieuport ring mounting, were fitted to some early 1 1/2 Strutters as a stopgap. The two-seaters could carry four 25 lb (11 kg) bombs underwing, which could be replaced by two 65 lb (29 kg) bombs for anti-submarine patrols. From the beginning, a light bomber version was planned, with the observer's cockpit eliminated to allow more fuel and bombs to be carried in the manner of the Martinsyde Elephant and the B.E.12, with an internal bomb bay capable of carrying four 65 lb (29 kg) bombs.

== Operational history ==
=== In British service ===
The prototype two seater flew in December 1915 and production deliveries started to reach the RNAS in February 1916. By the end of April, No. 5 Wing RNAS had a flight equipped with the new aircraft. The Sopwiths were used to escort the wing's Caudron G.4 and Breguet Bre.4 bombers and for bombing. The War Office had ordered the type for the RFC in March but because Sopwith's production capacity was contracted to the navy, the RFC orders had to be placed with Ruston Proctor and Vickers. Sub-contract production from these manufacturers did not get into its stride until August. Since the Battle of the Somme was planned for the end of June and with the RFC having a shortage of modern aircraft, it was agreed that a number of Sopwiths would be transferred from one service to the other, allowing 70 Squadron to reach the front by early July 1916 with Sopwith-built 1 1/2 Strutters, originally intended for the Navy.

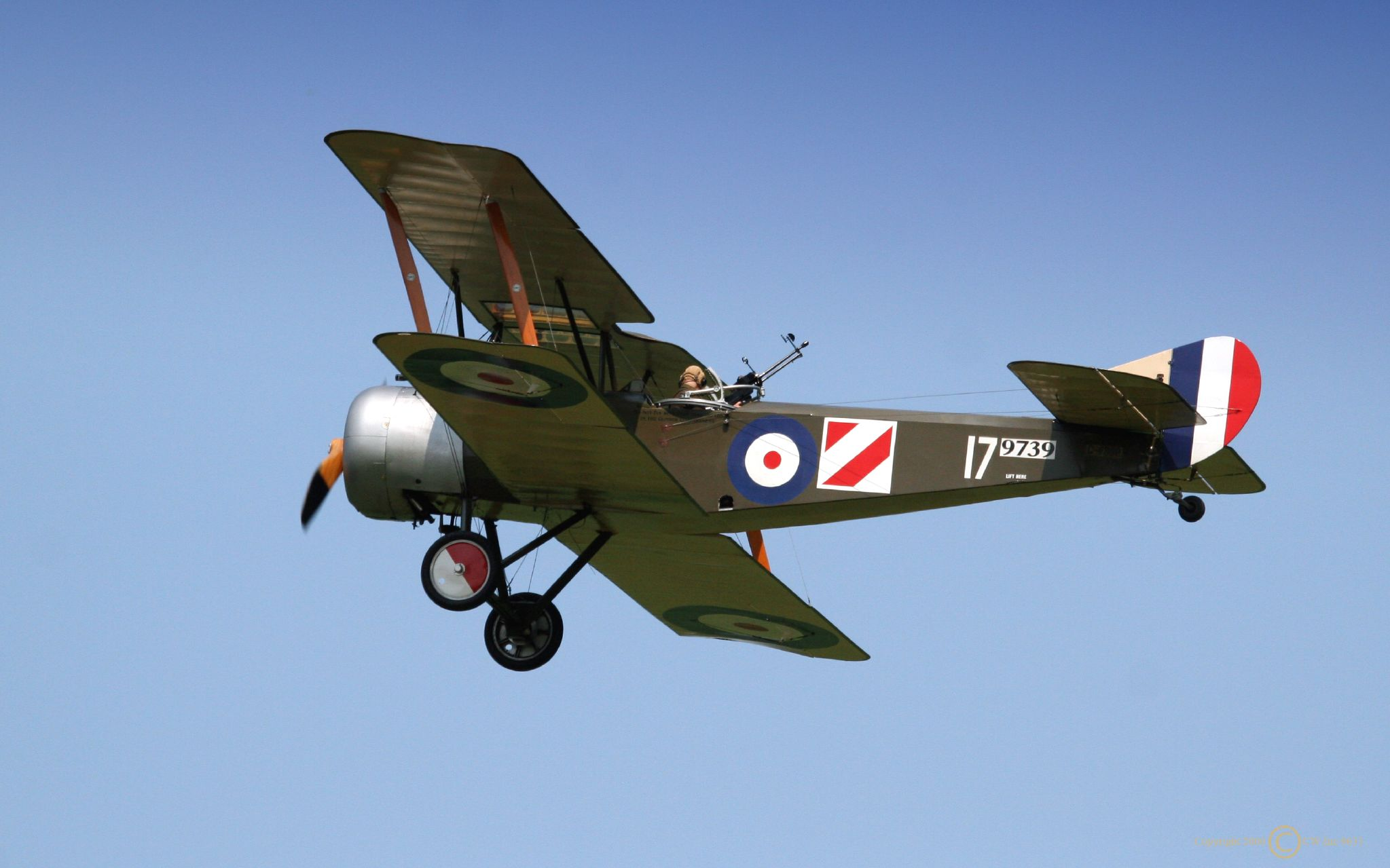
A replica Sopwith 1 1/2 Strutter in 1916 RNAS livery, flying at a 2006 air show

At first, 70 Squadron did very well with their new aircraft. The period of German ascendency known as the Fokker scourge was over and the 1 1/2 Strutter's long range and excellent armament enabled offensive patrolling deep into German-held territory. By the time 45 Squadron reached the front in October, the new Albatros fighters were arriving at the Jagdstaffeln. By January 1917, when 43 Squadron arrived in France, the 1 1/2 Strutter was outclassed as a fighter; a more powerful 130 hp (97 kW) Clerget 9B improved performance slightly but too late to reverse the situation. It was still a useful long-range reconnaissance aircraft when it could be provided with adequate fighter escort but was one of the types to suffer severely during "Bloody April", 43 squadron alone suffering 35 casualties, from an officer establishment of 32.

Like other early Sopwith types, the 1 1/2 Strutter was very lightly built and its structure did not stand up very well to arduous war service. It was far too stable to make a good dogfighter and the distance between the pilot and the observer's cockpits impeded their communication. The last operational 1 1/2 Strutters in the RFC were replaced by Sopwith Camels in late October 1917.

The type's long range and stability were good qualities for a home defence fighter and it served with 37, 44 and 78 squadrons. Most of the 1 1/2 Strutters supplied to home defence units had been built as two-seaters but many were converted locally to single-seaters to improve performance. Some of these single-seaters were similar to the bomber variant but others were of a different type, known (like similarly adapted Sopwith Camels) as the Sopwith Comic. The cockpit was moved back behind the wings and one or two Lewis guns, either mounted on Foster mountings or fixed to fire upwards, outside the arc of the propeller, replaced the synchronised Vickers.

The RNAS used most of their 1 1/2 Strutters as bombers (in the Aegean and Macedonia as well as in France) and as shipboard aircraft, where it was known as the Ship's Strutter and flew from aircraft carriers, other warships of the Royal Navy, and the battlecruiser HMAS Australia. It had been planned to use them on the Tondern raid, but Sopwith Camels were used instead. The RNAS and the RFC (and after April 1918 the Royal Air Force [RAF]) used the type as a trainer after it had been withdrawn from operational service and like the Sopwith Pup, it proved a popular personal aircraft for senior officers.

=== In French service ===
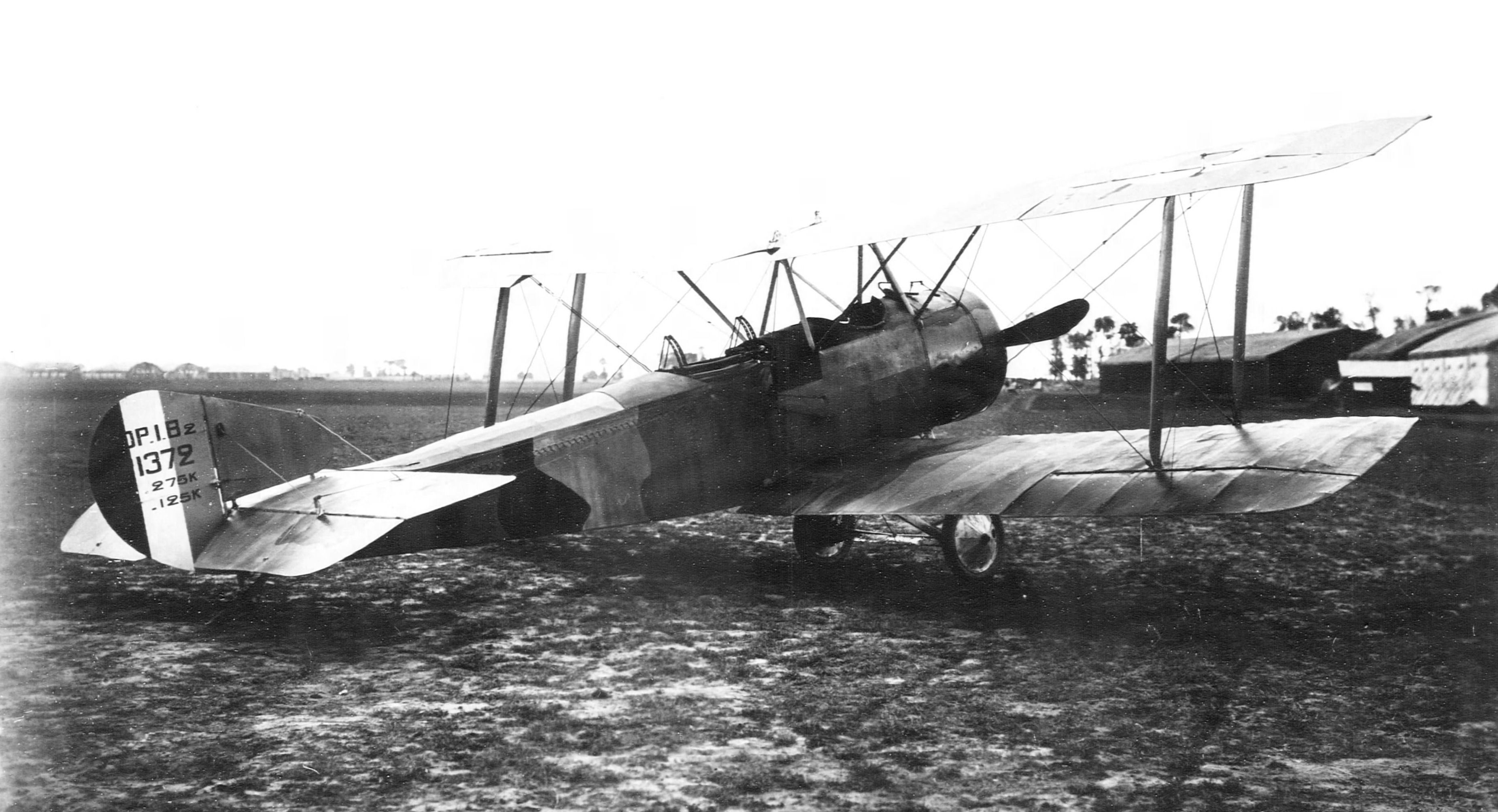
French Sopwith 1B.2 Strutter in late war camouflage

The largest user of the Sopwith was actually the French Aéronautique Militaire. By May 1916 it was obvious that the pusher Farman and Breguet bombers and reconnaissance aircraft were obsolete and with the failure of their tractor aircraft replacements, particularly the Nieuport 14, the Sopwith was ordered in large numbers from French manufacturers in three versions, the SOP. 1A.2 (two-seat reconnaissance), SOP. 1B.2 (two-seat bomber) and SOP. 1B.1 (single-seat bomber). While in French service, they equipped a large portion of the French bomber and artillery-observation squadrons and carried out many bombing attacks against industrial and military targets, including the German front lines. It was not as successful against fighters, suffering substantial casualties and downing fewer enemy aircraft than either the aircraft used before it or after. With the belated introduction of the Breguet 14 A.2 and B.2, the last of the Sopwiths were withdrawn from operational service in early 1918 although they would continue in service with training units until after the end of the war.

=== In other foreign service ===
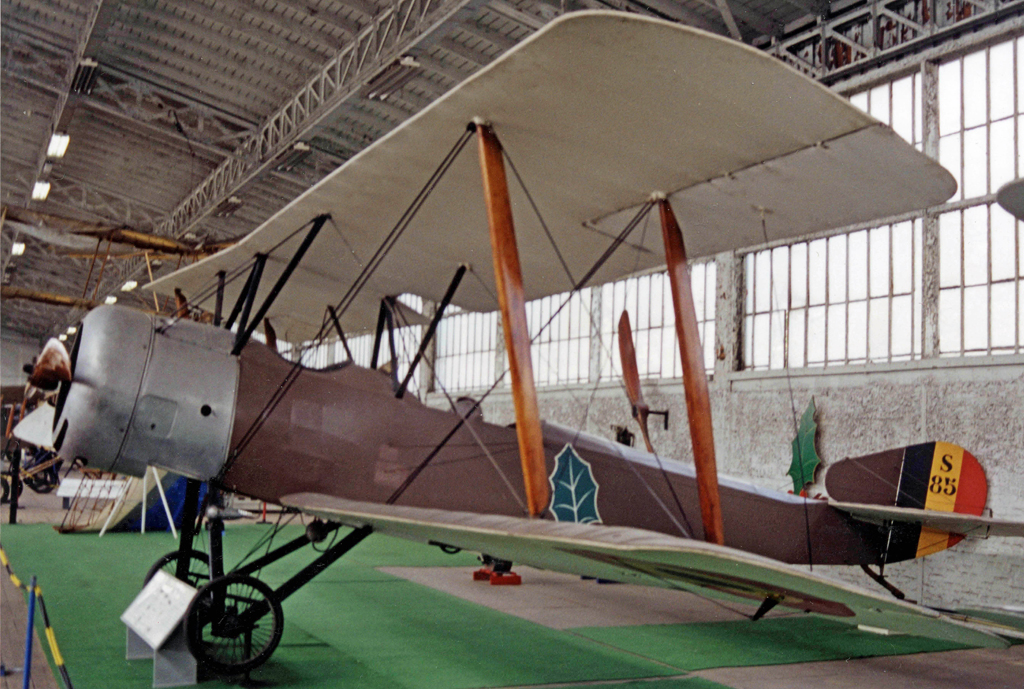
Belgian Air Force Sopwith on display in the Brussels Military Museum

Three Belgian squadrons also flew French-built Sopwiths, and surplus French Sopwiths were used by several countries postwar. During the war, several 1 1/2 Strutters that were interned after landing in the Netherlands were purchased for the Dutch Luchvaart Afdeeling. Over 100 1 1/2 Strutters were also built in Russia by Duks and Lebedev, supplemented by large numbers delivered directly from Britain and France. The 1 1/2 Strutter remained in large scale use by both the Soviet forces and White Russians during the Russian Civil War and Polish-Soviet war. Three were captured during this war and used by the Poles in 1919–1920. Other captured ones were used by Baltic states.

The American Expeditionary Force purchased 384 two-seat Strutter observation aircraft and 130 single-seat bombers from France in 1917–18. While mainly used for training, they were used operationally by the 90th Aero Squadron as an interim measure, due to a shortage of later types. The U.S. Navy used a number of the two-seat Sopwiths, along with Nieuport 28s and Hanriot HD.1s and 2s as ships' aircraft in the early postwar years, testing the use of aircraft from platforms mounted on the turrets of battleships. The 1 1/2 Strutter also served with the Imperial Japanese Army Air Force – some examples serving in the Japanese expeditionary force in Siberia during 1918. Around 1,500 1 1/2 Strutters were built for the Royal Flying Corps and the Royal Naval Air Service and between 4,200 and 4,500 were built in France.

== Variants and designations ==
Sopwith Land Clerget Tractor (or Sopwith LCT)
Sopwith company designation.
Sopwith Type 9400
Admiralty designation for two seater, number from serial of last aircraft in first batch ordered.
Sopwith Type 9700
Admiralty designation for single- seater bomber, number likewise assigned.
Sopwith Two seater
RFC designation.
Sopwith 1 1/2 Strutter
Unofficial name due to configuration of struts, also used by US Navy.
Sopwith Comic
Single seat home defence fighter
Ship(s) Strutter
Shipboard version
SOP. 1
French built version.

SOP. 1A.2 two-seat reconnaissance aircraft
SOP. 1B.1 single-seat bomber
SOP. 1B.2 two-seat bomber
SOP. 1E.2 two-seat trainer

LeO 1
Lioré et Olivier licence-built version.
So-shiki Model 1
Japanese licence-built bomber version.
So-Shiki Model 2
Japanese licence-built LeO 1 reconnaissance version.

== Operators ==
=== Military ===
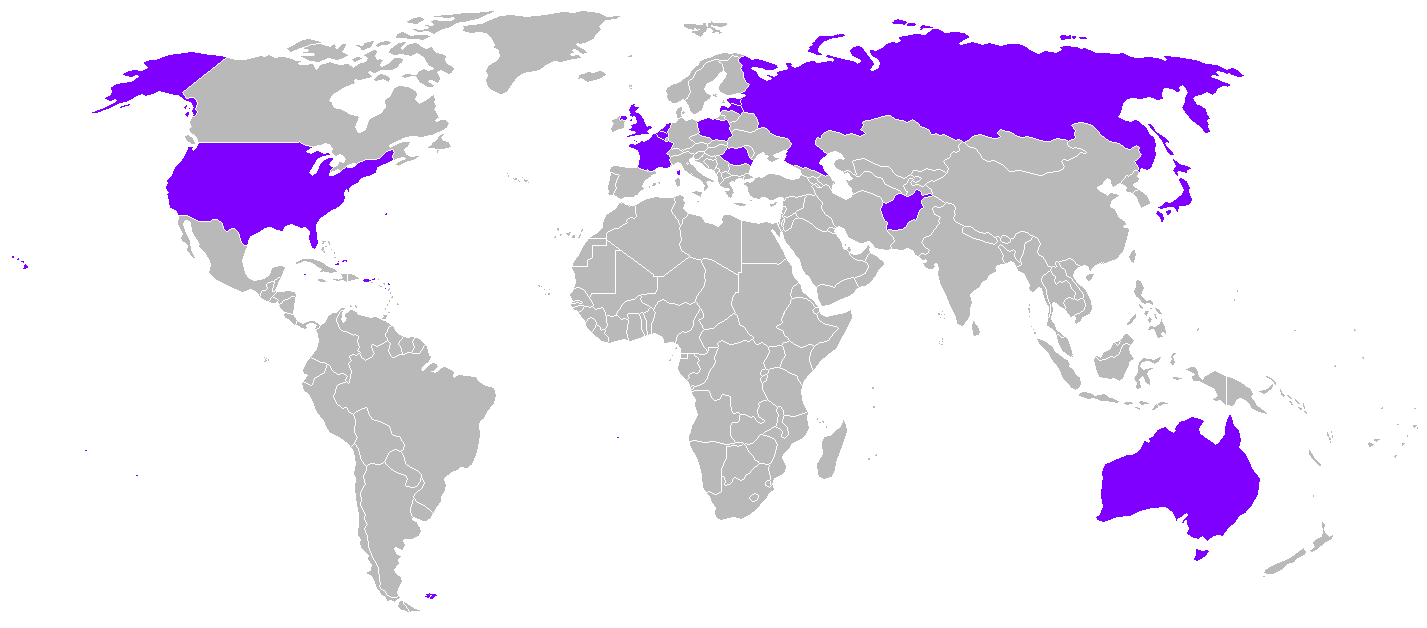
1 1/2 Strutter operators.

Afghanistan

- Afghanistan Air Force received a single aircraft from the Soviet Union in September 1921, which remained in existence until at least December 1924.

Australia

- Australian Flying Corps
  - No. 2 Squadron AFC operated one aircraft for training only.
  - No. 4 Squadron AFC used Strutters for training.
  - No. 6 (Training) Squadron AFC in the United Kingdom

Belgium

- Aviation Militaire Belge
  - 2ème Escadrille
  - 3ème Escadrille
  - 4ème Escadrille
  - 6ème Escadrille

Brazil

- Escola de Aviação Militar used three aircraft for liaison and army co-operation duties.

Czechoslovakia
Czechoslovak Legion used four SOP 1 A.2 delivered by the French Aviation Mission in Russia, and at least one Strutter captured from bolsheviks.
Estonia

- Estonian Air Force operated a single ex-Soviet aircraft.

France

- Aéronautique Militaire – A total of 72 Escadrilles equipped either wholly or partly.
- Aéronautique Navale

Greece

- Hellenic Navy – Six aircraft used in the Asia Minor Campaign against Turkey, 1918–21.

Japan

- Imperial Japanese Army Air Service

Latvia

- Latvian Air Force operated four ex-Soviet aircraft.
- Aizsargi

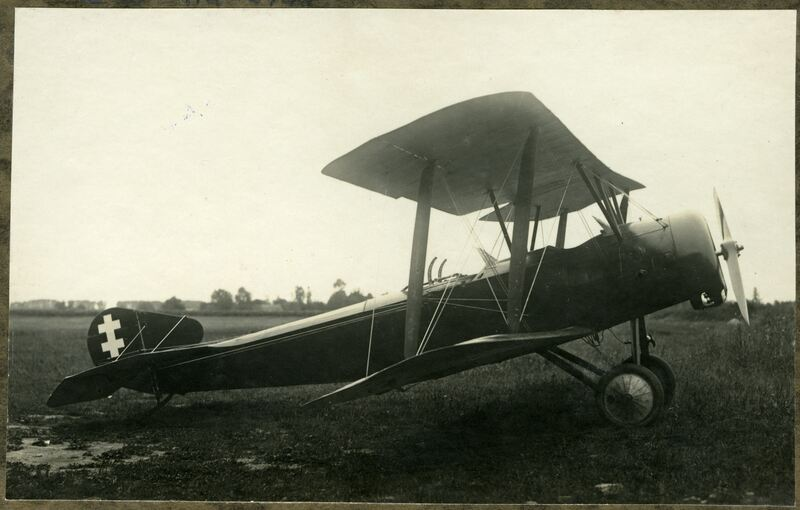
Strutter of Lithuanian Air Force. Before 1923

Lithuania

- Lithuanian Air Force operated a single ex-Soviet aircraft that landed behind Lithuanian lines during the Lithuanian–Soviet War. Two others may also have been operated.

Mexico

- Arma de Aviación Militar operated one example (TNCA registration 1-S-68) from c1920–1924.

Netherlands

- Luchtvaart Afdeling used five 1 1/2 Strutters that forced landed in neutral the Netherlands and were interned and subsequently purchased.

Poland

- Polish Air Force operated three aircraft captured from the Soviets in 1919–1920.

Romania

- Romanian Air Corps
  - Grupul 1 Aviație
  - Grupul 2 Aviație
  - Grupul 3 Aviație
  - Grupul 5 Aviație

Russia

- Imperial Russian Air Force and White Russian forces

Soviet Union

- Soviet Air Force

Ukraine

A single aircraft acquired from Russia in 1918.

United Kingdom

- Royal Flying Corps
  - No. 37 Squadron RFC
  - No. 39 Squadron RFC
  - No. 43 Squadron RFC
  - No. 44 Squadron RFC
  - No. 45 Squadron RFC
  - No. 46 Squadron RFC
  - No. 70 Squadron RFC
  - No. 78 Squadron RFC
  - No. 143 Squadron RFC
- Royal Naval Air Service
  - No. 2 (Naval) Squadron
  - No. 5 (Naval) Squadron
  - No. 8 (Naval) Squadron

United States

- Aviation Section, U.S. Signal Corps
- United States Army Air Service
  - 88th Aero Squadron
  - 90th Aero Squadron
  - 99th Aero Squadron
- United States Navy

=== Civil ===
Argentina

Two aircraft registered in 1928. R-105 (later LV-BAA) and R-106 (later LV-CAA). One of these two preserved in Florida.

France

55 aircraft on French civil register in 1922.

Japan

At least seven aircraft registered.

Sweden

Possibly one aircraft from Switzerland in 1926.

Switzerland

Two aircraft, CH-53 registered 9 April 1921, cancelled 9 October 1923. CH-67 registered 5 December 1923, cancelled December 1926 as sold to Sweden.

United Kingdom

One civil registered aircraft, G-EAVB.

== Survivors ==
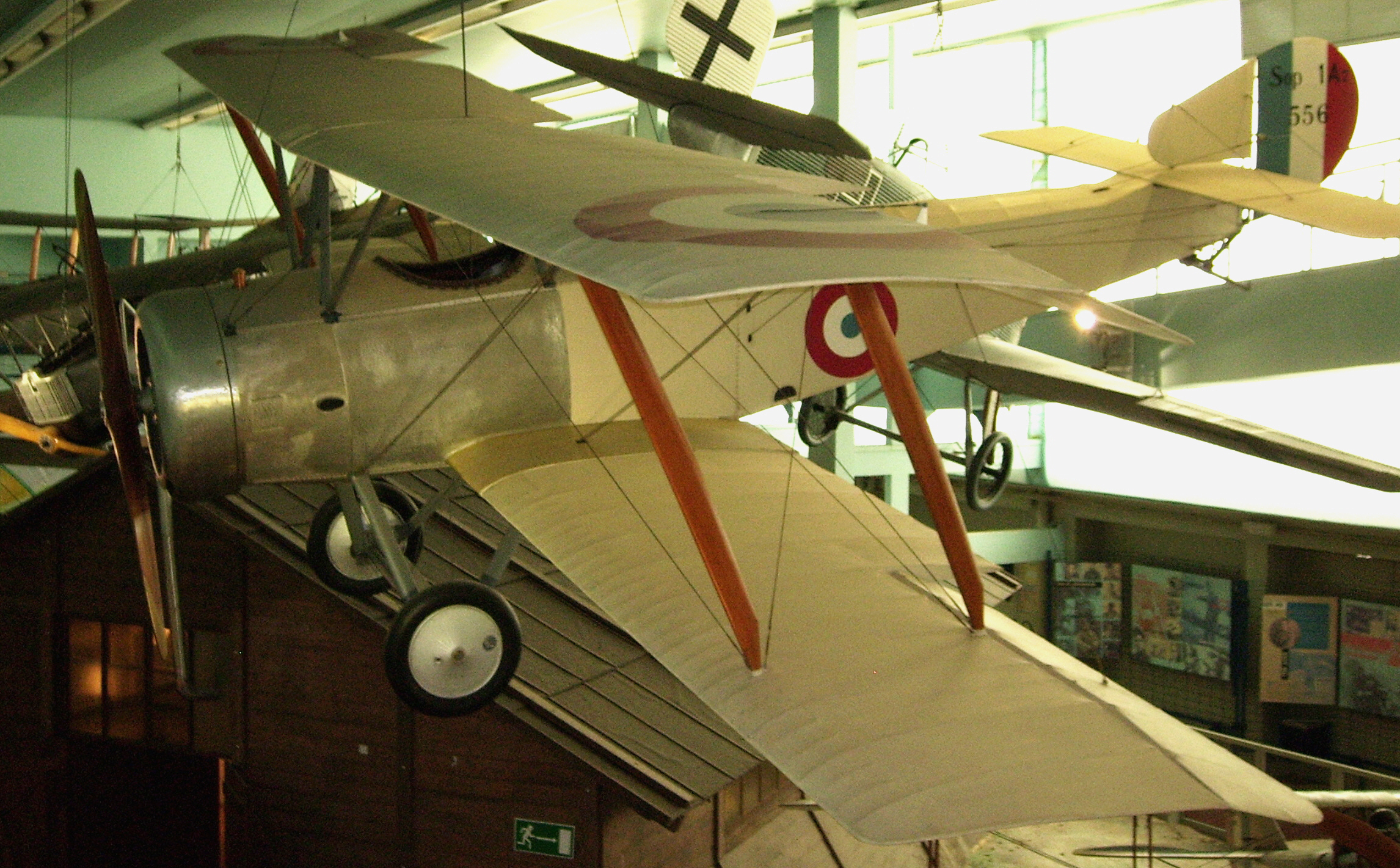
Sopwith No. 556 on display in the Musée de l'Air et de l'Espace at Paris le Bourget

Sopwith 1 1/2 Strutter aircraft are preserved at the following locations.

Belgium

- S-88 – On static display at the Royal Museum of the Armed Forces and of Military History in Brussels.

Canada

- Replica (C-FSOP) – Airworthy at The Great War Flying Museum in Caledon, Ontario.

France

- 556 – Sop.1A.2 on static display at the Musée de l'Air et de l'Espace in Paris, Île-de-France.
- 2897 – Sop.1B.2 airworthy at the Memorial Flight Association in La Ferté-Alais, Île-de-France.

New Zealand

- Unknown – Under restoration at The Vintage Aviator Limited in Masterton, Wellington. It was previously owned by Fantasy of Flight in Polk City, Florida, and was operated by Argentina before that.

United Kingdom

- Airworthy replica (G-CMDN) – built using original plans by the Aviation Preservation Society of Scotland at Congalton Gardens, North Berwick, East Lothian, EH39 5JP. First flew in September 2024.

== Specifications (1 1/2 Strutter – two seater, 130 hp Clerget) ==
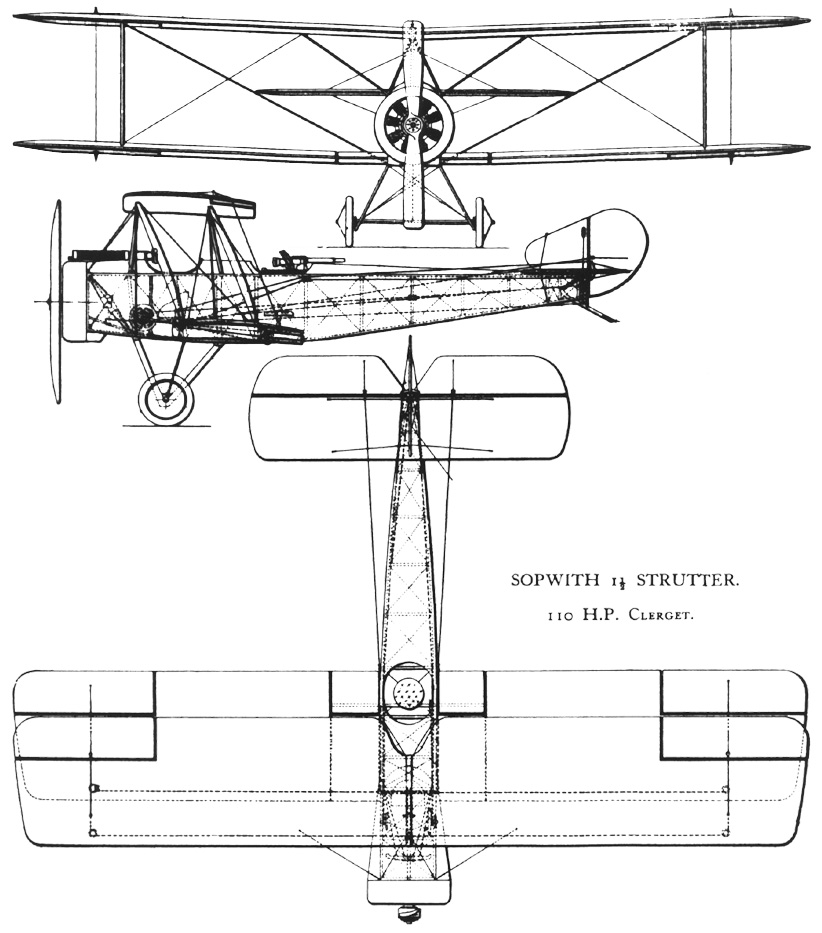
Sopwith 1 1/2 Strutter drawing

Data from British Aeroplanes 1914–18

General characteristics

- Crew: 2
- Length: 25 ft 3 in (7.70 m)
- Wingspan: 33 ft 6 in (10.21 m)
- Height: 10 ft 3 in (3.12 m)
- Wing area: 346 sq ft (32.1 m^{2})
- Empty weight: 1,305 lb (592 kg)
- Gross weight: 2,149 lb (975 kg)
- Max takeoff weight: 2,154 lb (977 kg)
- Powerplant: 1 × Clerget 9B 9-cylinder air-cooled rotary piston engine, 130 hp (97 kW)
- Propellers: 2-bladed fixed-pitch propeller

Performance

- Maximum speed: 100 mph (160 km/h, 87 kn) at 6,500 ft (1,981 m)
- Endurance: 3 hours 45 minutes
- Service ceiling: 15,500 ft (4,700 m)
- Time to altitude: 6,500 ft (1,981 m) in 9 minutes 10 seconds

Armament

- Guns: ** 1 × .303 in (7.7 mm) forward-firing synchronised Vickers machine gun
  - 1 × .303 in (7.7 mm) Lewis gun in observer's cockpit
- Bombs: Up to 130 lb (60 kg) bombs

== See also ==
Related development

- Sopwith Pup

Aircraft of comparable role, configuration, and era

- Dorand AR
- Nieuport 14
- Royal Aircraft Factory R.E.8

Related lists

- List of aircraft of the Royal Flying Corps
- List of aircraft of the Royal Naval Air Service
