= Lewis Brandon =

RAF navigator, actor and author (1911–2002)

- Born: 1911
- Died: 22 April 2002 (aged 90–91)
- Military career
- Allegiance: United Kingdom
- Branch: Royal Air Force
- Rank: Squadron leader
- Conflicts: Second World War: Battle of Britain; Operation Diver
- Awards: Distinguished Service Order; Distinguished Flying Cross & Bar

Squadron Leader Lewis Brandon DSO DFC and Bar (1911-22 April 2002) was an actor in the 1930s and served in the Royal Air Force as a navigator in night fighters during World War Two.

Brandon's acting career lasted throughout the 1930s and included regular work as a body double for actors such as Rex Harrison, Robert Donat and Robert Newton.

After being called up to wartime service, he joined the Royal Air Force and flew on around 80 defence flights over Britain and about 50 across Europe, flying Bristol Beaufighters and de Havilland Mosquitos, mostly as navigator and radar operator to James Benson. He received one Distinguished Service Order and two Distinguished Flying Crosses.

After leaving the RAF in 1955, he ran a café in Melton Mowbray before moving to Brighton to run the Rex Hotel. In 1961, his autobiographical book Night Flyer, which described his wartime experiences, was published and was "warmly praised by Winston Churchill". In 1965 he moved to a house in neighbouring Hove and took over as landlord of the Albion Inn there.

Brandon was married and had four children.

== Bibliography ==
- Middleton, Judy (2002). The Encyclopaedia of Hove & Portslade. Brighton: Brighton & Hove Libraries.
