= Sopwith Bulldog =

British WW1 two-seat biplane fighter aircraft

Bulldog
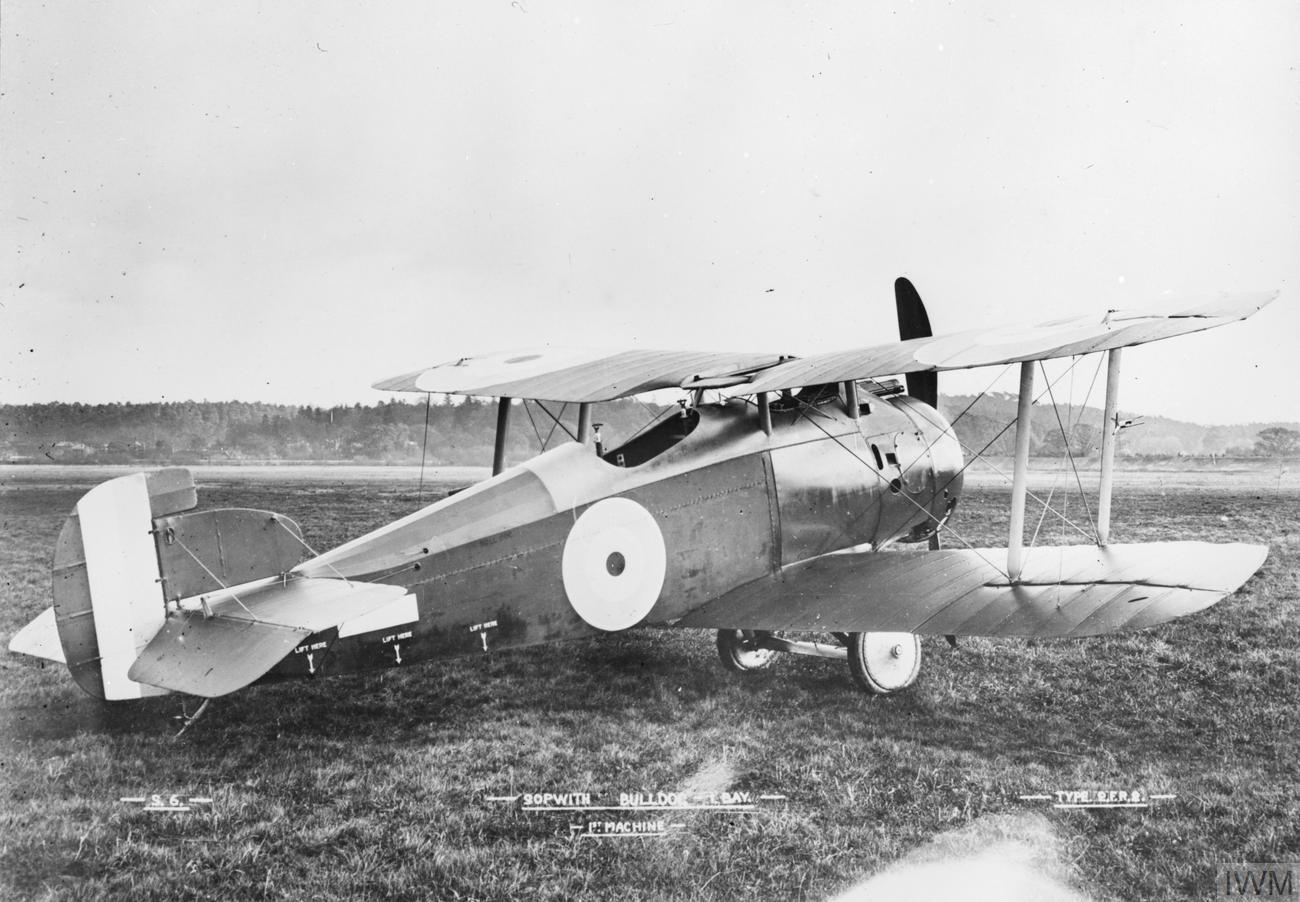

General information
- Type: Fighter/reconnaissance aircraft
- National origin: United Kingdom
- Manufacturer: Sopwith
- Number built: 2

History
- First flight: 1918

The Sopwith 2FR.2 Bulldog was a prototype British two-seat fighter of the First World War. A single-engined biplane, the Bulldog was a fighter/reconnaissance aircraft intended to replace the Bristol F.2 Fighter, but was unsuccessful, with no replacement for the Bristol Fighter being purchased.

== Development and design ==
In August 1917, the Sopwith Aviation Company started design of a two-seat fighter reconnaissance aircraft intended to replace the Bristol F.2 Fighter, and received permission to build prototypes of the Sopwith FR.2. It was intended to power the FR.2 with a 200 hp (149 kW) Hispano-Suiza 8 water-cooled V-8 engine, but the Hispano was in great demand, and it was decided to switch to the new Clerget 11, an eleven-cylinder rotary engine, a change which led to the prospective design being redesignated 2FR.2.

The Bulldog was a compact single-bay biplane resembling the first prototype Sopwith Snipe single-seat fighter. The pilot sat under the upper wing, with his head and shoulders protruding through a large gap in the centre section, while the observer's cockpit was aft of the trailing edge of the upper wing. Armament was two synchronised Vickers machine guns in a hump ahead of the pilot, while the observer/gunner was provided with two Lewis guns, one on a telescopic mounting forward of the observer's cockpit, and the second on a pillar mounting to give rearward defence.

The first prototype appeared early in 1918, but it was overweight and handled poorly. It was quickly rebuilt with much larger two-bay wings, which improved the handling, but the prototype's performance remained disappointing, not even matching that of the aircraft it was intended to replace. The poor performance was in part due to the Clerget engine's failure to provide the expected power, producing only 200 hp (149 kW) instead of the expected 260 hp (194 kW). The second prototype was fitted with a 360 hp (267 kW) ABC Dragonfly radial engine, becoming the Bulldog Mk.II, with the first prototype becoming the Bulldog Mk.I. However, although the Dragonfly gave much more power than the Clerget, it was hopelessly unreliable, with one test pilot stating that "... I never remember being able to get all cylinders to fire at the same time" and "I don't remember that we got a single successful performance with the engine."

Work on a third prototype was abandoned because of the failure of the first two aircraft, although the second prototype continued in use until at least March 1919 carrying out test flights in futile attempts to solve the problems of the Dragonfly.

== Specifications (Mk.I, two-bay wings) ==
Data from War Planes of the First World War: Volume Three Fighters

General characteristics

- Crew: 2
- Length: 23 ft 0 in (7.01 m)
- Wingspan: 33 ft 9 in (10.29 m)
- Height: 8 ft 9 in (2.67 m)
- Wing area: 335 sq ft (31.1 m^{2})
- Empty weight: 1,441 lb (654 kg)
- Gross weight: 2,495 lb (1,132 kg)
- Powerplant: 1 × Clerget 11Eb 11-cylinder rotary piston engine, 200 hp (150 kW)
- Propellers: 2-bladed fixed-pitch propeller

Performance

- Maximum speed: 109 mph (175 km/h, 95 kn) at 10,000 ft (3,000 m)
- Endurance: 2 hours
- Service ceiling: 15,000 ft (4,600 m)
- Time to altitude: 15,000 ft (4,600 m) in 15 minutes 35 seconds

Armament

- Guns: 2× forward firing .303 in Vickers machine guns and 2× Lewis guns in rear cockpit

== See also ==
Aircraft of comparable role, configuration, and era

- Bristol F.2 Fighter
- Sopwith Hippo
