= Sopwith Salamander =

British WW1 biplane ground attack/close support aircraft

Sopwith TF.2 Salamander
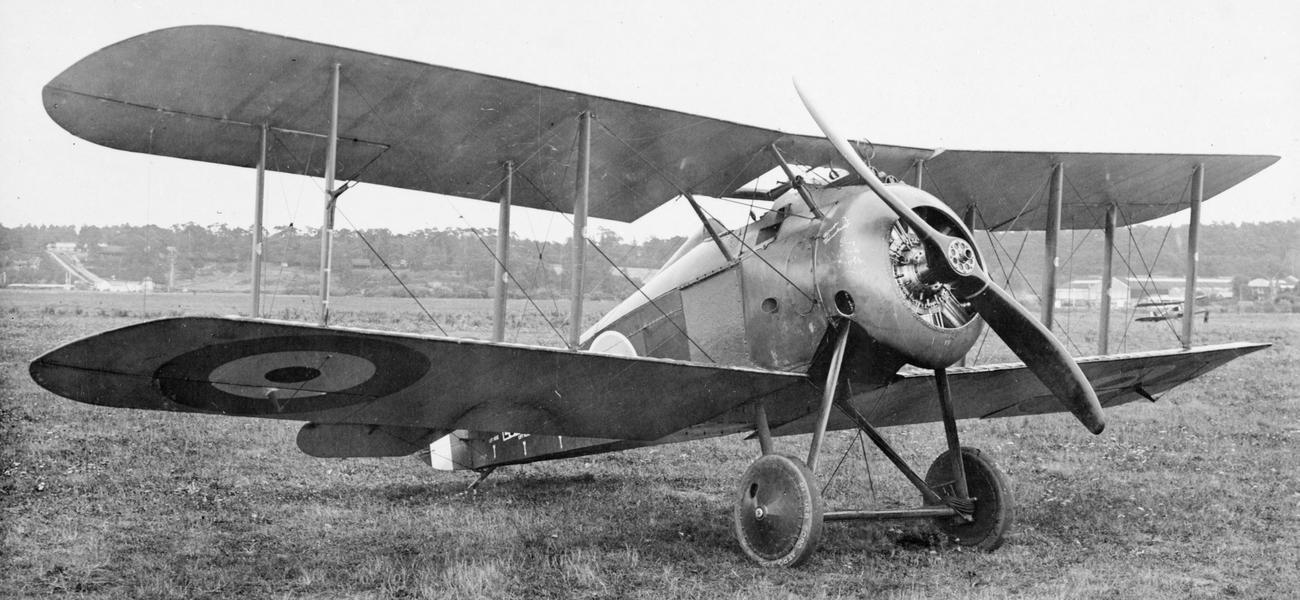
- Salamander prototype at Brooklands

General information
- Type: Ground attack
- National origin: United Kingdom
- Manufacturer: Sopwith
- Primary user: Royal Air Force
- Number built: 210

History
- Manufactured: 1918–1919
- Introduction date: 1918
- First flight: 27 April 1918
- Developed from: Sopwith Snipe

The Sopwith TF.2 Salamander was a British ground-attack aircraft of the First World War designed by the Sopwith Aviation Company which first flew in April 1918. It was a single-engined, single-seat biplane, based on the Sopwith Snipe fighter, with an armoured forward fuselage to protect the pilot and fuel system from ground fire during low level operations. It was ordered in large numbers for the Royal Air Force but the war ended before the type could enter squadron service, although two were in France in October 1918.

== Design and development ==
In August 1917, the British Royal Flying Corps (RFC) introduced the coordinated mass use of single-seat fighter aircraft for low-level ground-attack operations in support of the Third Battle of Ypres, with Airco DH.5s, which were unsuitable for high-altitude combat, specialising in this role. The tactic proved effective and was repeated at the Battle of Cambrai in November 1917 by DH.5s and Sopwith Camels being used in strafing attacks. While the tactic proved successful, losses of the unarmoured fighters proved to be extremely high, reaching up to 30 per cent per day. Most losses were due to ground fire, although low-flying aircraft also proved vulnerable to attacks from above by enemy fighters. Two-seat German fighters such as Halberstadt CL.II, originally designed as escort fighters, were also used for ground-attack, playing an important role in the German counter-offensive at Cambrai. While the CL-type fighters were not armoured, the Germans also introduced more specialised heavily armoured two-seat aircraft such as the Junkers J.I for contact patrol and ground-attack work.

As a result of the high losses sustained during strafing and after seeing the success of the new German types, the RFC instructed the Sopwith Aviation Company to modify a Camel for close air support, by fitting downward-firing guns and armour. The modified Camel, known as the "TF.1" (trench fighter 1), flew on 15 February 1918. Two Lewis guns were fixed to fire downwards and forwards at an angle of 45 degrees and a third gun was mounted on the upper wing. The downward-firing guns proved to be of little use, being almost impossible to aim. The TF.1 did not go into production but information gained in testing it was used for the Salamander design.

Work on a more advanced armoured fighter, conceived as an armoured version of the Sopwith Snipe, began early in 1918. The forward portion of the fuselage was a 605 lb (275 kg) box of armour plate, forming an integral part of the aircraft structure, protecting the pilot and fuel system, with a 0.315 in (8 mm) front plate, a 0.433 in (11 mm) bottom plate, 0.236 in (6 mm) side plates and rear armour consisting of an 11-gauge and 6-gauge plate separated by an air gap. The rear (unarmoured) section of the fuselage was a generally similar structure to the Snipe but flat sided, to match the forepart. The two-bay wings and tailplane were identical in form to those of the Snipe but were strengthened to cope with the extra weight, while the fin and rudder were identical to the Snipe. The new aircraft used the same Bentley BR2 rotary engine as the Snipe, covered by an unarmoured cowling – the foremost armour plate forming the firewall.

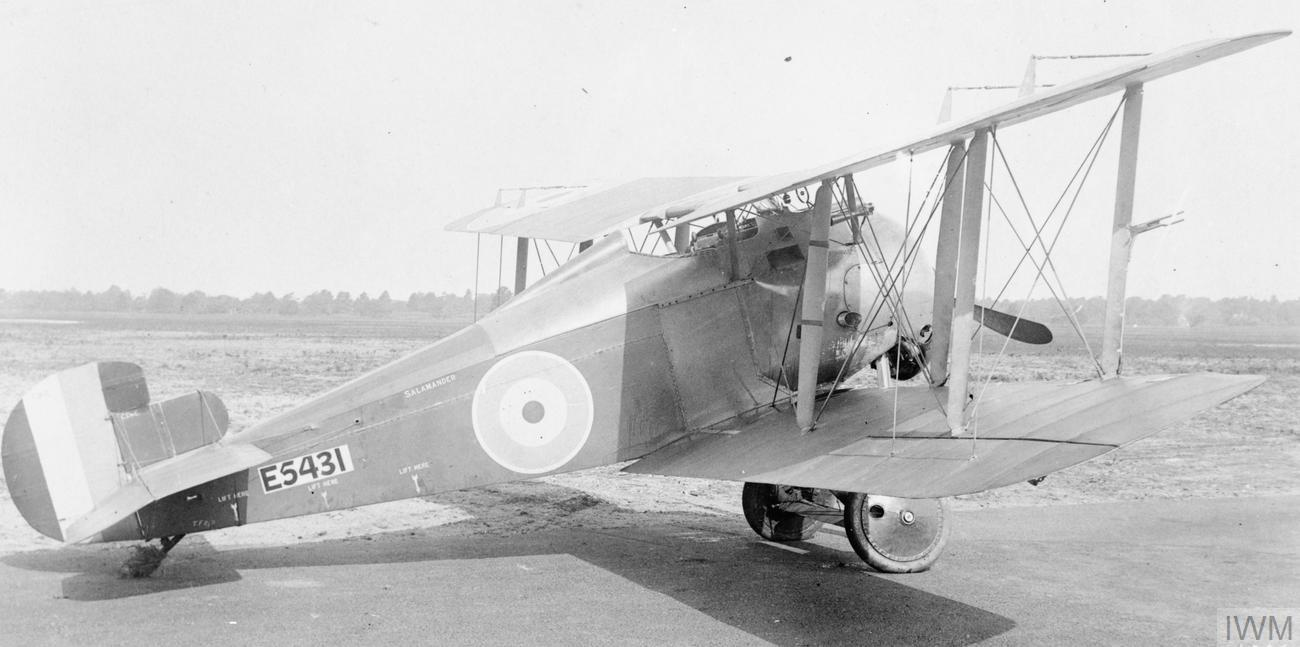
Side view of third prototype Salamander

Originally an armament of three machine guns was planned, with two Lewis guns firing forwards and downwards through the cockpit floor as in the TF.1, and a forward firing Vickers machine gun. This was changed to a conventional battery of two synchronised Vickers guns in front of the cockpit, as on the Snipe, before the first prototype was complete. The guns were staggered, with the starboard gun mounted a few inches forward of the port one to give more room for ammunition. Four light bombs could also be carried.

The first prototype started flight tests at Brooklands aerodrome on 27 April 1918 and was sent to France for evaluation on 9 May. It was wrecked in a crash on 19 May while being flown by No. 65 Squadron when the pilot had to avoid a tender crossing the aerodrome responding to another crash. While the Salamander was generally considered promising in the ground-attack role, lateral control was recognised as poor. To rectify these problems, the Salamander underwent many of the same modifications to the tail and ailerons as the Snipe.

== Service history ==
Production was intended to be on a very large scale – an initial order for 500 aircraft was placed with Sopwith on 18 June, followed by additional orders with Wolseley Motors, the Air Navigation Co., Glendower Aircraft, Palladium Motors and the National Aircraft Factory No. 1. A total of 1,400 Salamanders were ordered. Production was slowed, however, by problems producing the armour plate, this being prone to distortion during the hardening process, and shortages of the BR.2 engine. (Note: The 200 hp (149 kW) Clerget 11Eb rotary engine was planned as an alternative to the BR.2, but no Clerget powered Salamanders were built.) By the end of October 1918 only 37 Salamanders were on RAF charge, and just two of these were in France. The first Salamander-equipped squadron, 157 Squadron, was due to fly out to France with 24 aircraft on 21 November, with more squadrons in the process of forming in the United Kingdom.

With the Armistice, the immediate need for a specialist close support aircraft evaporated, and 157 Squadron was quickly disbanded. Production continued for several months following the Armistice, with at least 497 completed. It was discovered postwar that 70 Salamanders had been fitted with Sopwith Snipe wings instead of the stronger wings of the Salamander, rendering the aircraft unsafe, while the armoured section was subject to spontaneous distortion, misaligning the airframe and again making the aircraft dangerous. The Salamander was used in trials of various patterns of disruptive camouflage in 1919, while some Salamanders were still in use at Heliopolis, Egypt in 1922. One example went to America, and was still in existence at McCook Field in 1926.

== Operators ==
United Kingdom

- Royal Air Force
  - No. 86 Squadron RAF
  - No. 96 Squadron RAF
  - No. 157 Squadron RAF

== Specifications (Sopwith TF.2 Salamander) ==
Data from British Aeroplanes 1914–18

General characteristics

- Crew: 1
- Length: 19 ft 6 in (5.94 m)
- Wingspan: 31 ft 2.6 in (9.51 m)
- Height: 9 ft 4 in (2.84 m)
- Wing area: 272 sq ft (25.3 m^{2})
- Empty weight: 1,844 lb (836 kg)
- Gross weight: 2,512 lb (1,139 kg)
- Fuel capacity: 29 imp gal (35 US gal; 132 L)
- Powerplant: 1 × Bentley BR2 9-cylinder air-cooled rotary piston engine, 230 hp (170 kW)
- Propellers: 2-bladed fixed-pitch propeller

Performance

- Maximum speed: 125 mph (201 km/h, 109 kn) at 500 ft (152 m)
- Endurance: 1 hour 30 minutes
- Service ceiling: 13,000 ft (4,000 m)
- Time to altitude:

- 6,500 ft (1,981 m) in 9 minutes 5 seconds
- 10,000 ft (3,048 m) in 17 minutes 5 seconds

Armament

- Guns: 2 × 0.303 in Vickers machine guns, 2,000 rounds of ammunition
- Bombs: 4 × 25 lb (10 kg) bombs

== See also ==
Related development

- Sopwith Snipe
- Sopwith Dragon

Aircraft of comparable role, configuration, and era

- AEG DJ.I

Related lists

- List of aircraft of the Royal Air Force
