= Sopwith Aviation Company =

British aircraft manufacturer, 1913–1920

Sopwith Aviation & Engineering Company Limited
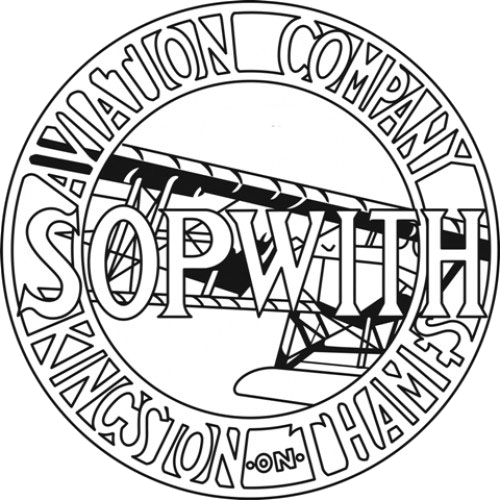
- Formerly: Sopwith Aviation Company
- Industry: Aviation
- Founded: 15 December 1913
- Founder: Thomas Sopwith
- Defunct: 16 September 1920
- Fate: Ceased trading
- Successor: H. G. Hawker Engineering
- Headquarters: Kingston-on-Thames, UK
- Products: Aircraft
- Number of employees: 5,000

The Sopwith Aviation Company was a British aircraft company that designed and manufactured aeroplanes mainly for the British Royal Naval Air Service, the Royal Flying Corps and later the Royal Air Force during the First World War, most famously the Sopwith Camel. Sopwith aircraft were also used in varying numbers by the French, Belgian and American air services during the war.

In April 1919, the company was renamed as the Sopwith Aviation & Engineering Company Limited. In September 1920, the company entered voluntary liquidation after an attempt to build motorcycles failed. The patents and other assets were bought by a new company, H. G. Hawker Engineering.

== Early years ==
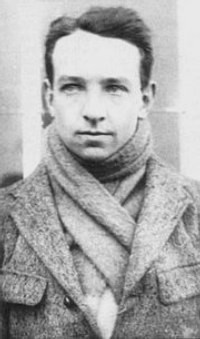
Thomas Sopwith, c. 1910

The Sopwith Aviation Company (based at Brooklands) was created in June 1912 by Thomas Sopwith, a wealthy sportsman interested in aviation, yachting and motor-racing, when he was 24 years old. Following their first military aircraft sale in November 1912, Sopwith moved to the company's first factory premises which opened that December in a recently closed roller skating rink in Canbury Park Road near Kingston Railway Station in South West London. An early collaboration with the S. E. Saunders boatyard of East Cowes on the Isle of Wight, in 1913, produced the Sopwith "Bat Boat", an early flying boat with a Consuta laminated hull which could operate on sea or land. A small factory subsequently opened in Woolston, Hampshire in 1914.

== First World War ==
The company made more than 16,000 aircraft during the First World War. Many more of the company's aircraft were built by subcontractors rather than by Sopwith themselves. These included Fairey, Clayton and Shuttleworth, William Beardmore and Company and Ruston Proctor.

Towards the end of the war, Sopwith took out a lease on National Aircraft Factory No.2, constructed in 26 weeks during the winter of 1917 a mile to the north of the Canbury works in Ham. The company were able to greatly increase production of Snipe, Dolphin and Salamander fighter planes as a result. At the beginning of the war the company had 200 employees; this had reached 6,000 employees by the Armistice.

== Post-war diversification and failure ==
After the war, the company attempted to produce aircraft for the civil market based on their wartime types. These included aircraft such as a single-winged Camel and the Dove, a derivative of the Pup and the Swallow, but the wide availability of war-surplus aircraft at knock-down prices meant this was never economical. In 1919 the company was renamed as Sopwith Aviation & Engineering Company, and the factory was re-organised to produce ABC motorcycles under licence; this included an investment of £100,000 in new machinery. In September 1920 the Kingston factory closed for stocktaking, and the company decided to enter voluntary liquidation; the works manager at Kingston announced in a letter to the 1400 employees:

We much regret we find it impossible to reopen the works, as the difficulties caused by restricted credit prevent the company from finding sufficient capital to carry on the business, and it will be therefore wound up.

— H. G. Mitchell,

At a meeting of creditors held in October 1920 it was explained that although the company had previously accumulated a surplus of £900,000 in 1918, following a slump in the sale of motorcycles the company had liabilities of £705,430 (which included £583,510 for excess profits duty) and assets of £862,630. The amount of excess profit duty was being disputed by the company which had already paid £450,000 in duty. The meeting concluded that the best result would be to sell the business as a going concern.

The Ham factory, which was included in 38 acres (15 ha) of freehold land, was sold to Leyland Motors. The newly formed H. G. Hawker Engineering Company obtained the Sopwith patent rights and a government contract to refurbish Sopwith Snipe biplanes.

== Hawker Engineering ==
Upon the liquidation of the Sopwith company, Tom Sopwith himself, together with Harry Hawker, Fred Sigrist and Bill Eyre, immediately formed H. G. Hawker Engineering, forerunner of the Hawker Aircraft and Hawker Siddeley lineage. Sopwith was Chairman of Hawker Siddeley until his retirement. Hawker and its successors produced many more famous military aircraft, including the inter-war Hart and Demon; World War II's Hurricane, Typhoon, and Tempest; and the post-war Sea Fury, Hunter and Harrier. These later jet types were manufactured in the same factory buildings used to produce Sopwith Snipes in 1918, as Hawker Aircraft bought the Ham Factory when Leyland's lease expired in 1948.

== Present day ==
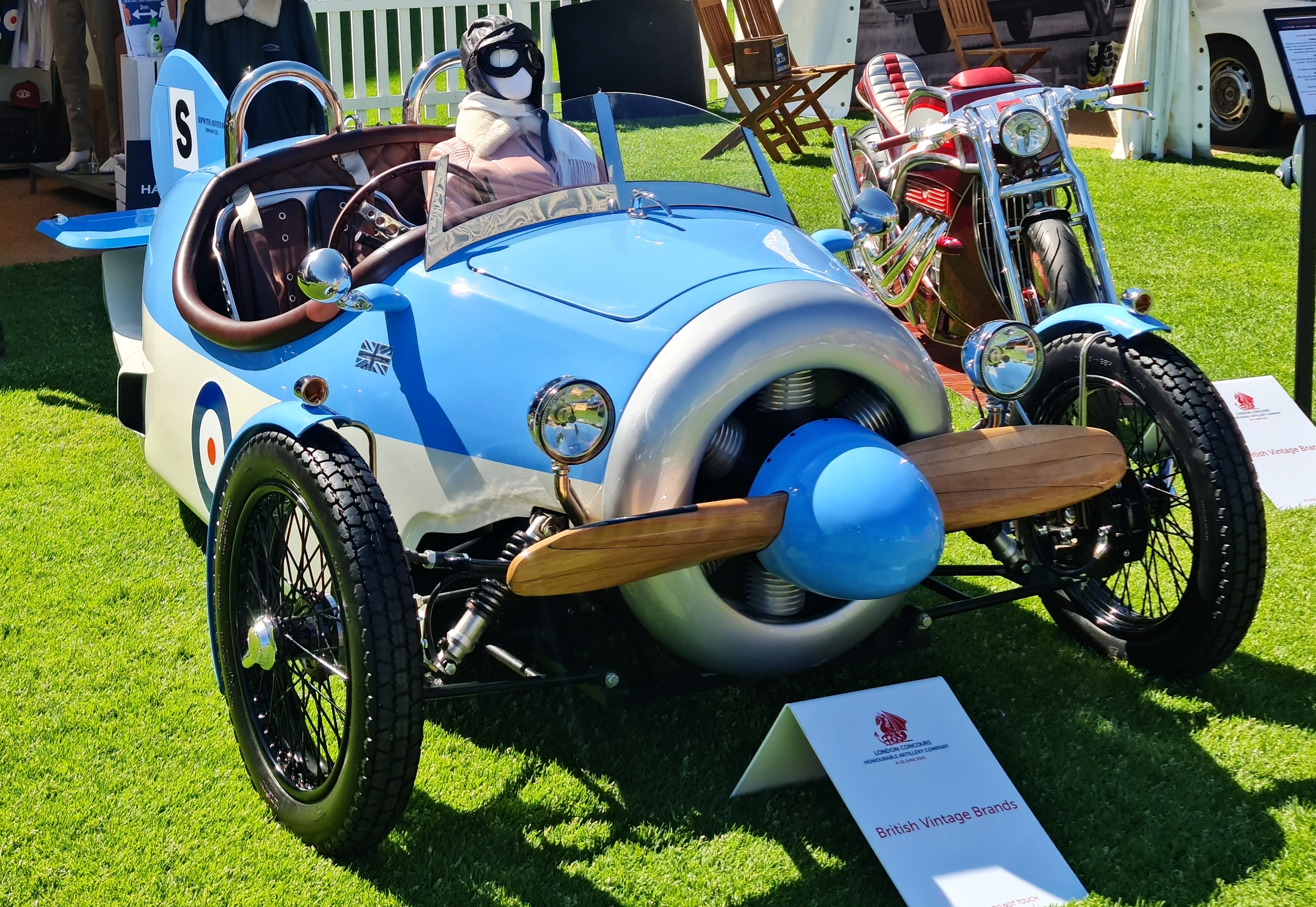
Sopwith Dove concept vehicle

In 2021, the Sopwith Aviation name was acquired by Bevan Davidson International based in Swaffham, Norfolk, who plan to release a line of celebratory motor vehicles in celebration of the history of Sopwith. A two-seater sports car, styled and named after the Sopwith Dove was revealed at the London Concours car show later that year.

== Famous Sopwith aircraft ==
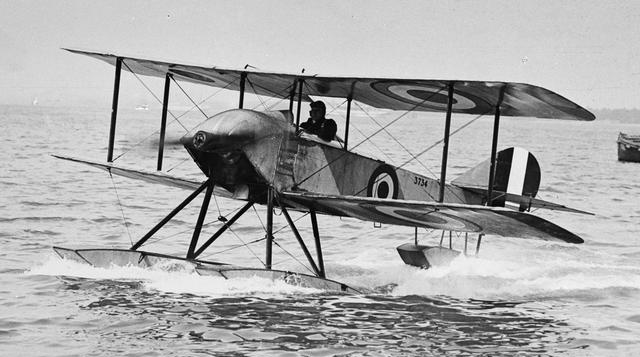
The Sopwith "Schneider" (a float-equipped Sopwith Tabloid) at the 1914 Schneider Trophy in Monaco

Initially, Tom Sopwith himself, assisted by his former personal mechanic Fred Sigrist, led the design of the company's types. Following a number of pre-war designs for the Royal Naval Air Service, such as the Three-seater and the Bat Boat, Sopwith's first major success was the fast and compact (hence the name) Tabloid, a design which first showed the influence of the company's test pilot, the Australian Harry Hawker. A float-equipped version of this aircraft won the Schneider Trophy in 1914. The landplane version was used by both the RNAS and RFC at the start of the war. With higher power and floats, the type evolved into the Sopwith Baby, which was a workhorse of the RNAS for much of the First World War.

In 1916, Herbert Smith became Chief Engineer of the Sopwith company, and under his design leadership its other successful World War I types included the larger Type 9901. This aircraft, better known as the 1½ Strutter due to its unconventional cabane strut arrangement, was used from 1916 by the RNAS, RFC and the French Aviation Militaire as a single-seat bomber, two-seat fighter and artillery spotter and trainer. Soon after came the small and agile single-seat Scout, which quickly became better known as the Pup because of its obvious descent from the 1½ Strutter. The Pup and 1½ Strutter were the first successful British tractor fighters equipped with a synchronisation gear to allow a machine gun to fire through the rotating propeller. This gear was known as the Sopwith-Kauper gear from its designers, although several other designs were used later. The Pup was widely used on the Western Front by the RFC and from ships by the RNAS from the autumn of 1916 to the early summer of 1917, and was considered a delight to fly by its pilots. It continued in use as an advanced trainer for the remainder of the War. The Pup began the famous series of animal-named Sopwith aircraft during the war, which, as a whole, would become renowned in aviation history as "The Flying Zoo".

Experimentally equipped with three narrow-chord wings and a more powerful engine, the Pup led to the Triplane, which was used by just four squadrons of the RNAS during 1917, but became well known for its startling fighting qualities, put to best use by Raymond Collishaw's famous 'Black Flight' of 'Naval 10' (No. 10 Squadron RNAS). This flight was so called due to the black identification colour of the flight's aircraft, which in turn led to their naming as Black Maria, Black Prince, Black Death, Black Roger and Black Sheep. Such was the impact of this type that it spawned a large number of experimental triplane designs from manufacturers on all sides, although only the Fokker Triplane achieved any subsequent success.

In the early summer of 1917, the twin-gun Camel fighter was introduced. This aircraft was highly manoeuvrable and well-armed, and over 5,000 were produced up until the end of the War. It destroyed more enemy aircraft than any other British type, but its difficult flying qualities also killed very many novice pilots in accidents. It was used, modified, as both a night-fighter and shipboard aircraft, and was flown in combat by the Belgian and American Air Services as well as the British.

Later still in front-line service came the stationary-engined four-gun Dolphin and the ultimate rotary-engined fighter, the Snipe. The Snipe saw little wartime service, being issued only in small numbers to the Front, but William George Barker, the Canadian ace, won a Victoria Cross flying one in an epic single-handed dogfight against enormous odds.

Towards the end of the war, the company produced the Cuckoo torpedo-bomber and the Salamander armoured ground-attack development of the Snipe, but these types were too late to see action. Many other experimental prototypes were produced throughout the war, mostly named after animals (Hippo, Gnu etc.), leading to some referring to the 'Sopwith Zoo'.

Following World War I, the Sopwith Snipe was chosen as the standard fighter of the much-reduced Royal Air Force, and soldiered on until finally replaced in the late 1920s.

== Aircraft ==
=== Pre-World War I ===
- Sopwith-Wright Biplane (1912)
- Sopwith Hybrid Biplane (1912)
- Sopwith Three-seater (1912)
- Sopwith Bat Boat (1913)
- Sopwith Sociable (1913)
- Sopwith 1913 Circuit of Britain floatplane -See Sopwith Bat Boat Improved Type 2 (Circuit of Britain)
- Sopwith Admiralty Type C (1914)
- Sopwith Special torpedo seaplane Type C
- Sopwith 1914 Schneider Racer
- Sopwith Type SPGN or "Gunbus"

=== World War I ===
- Sopwith Admiralty Type 137
- Sopwith Type 806
- Sopwith Type 807
- Sopwith Type 860
- Sopwith Two-Seat Scout
- Sopwith Tabloid
- Sopwith Baby
- Sopwith Sparrow
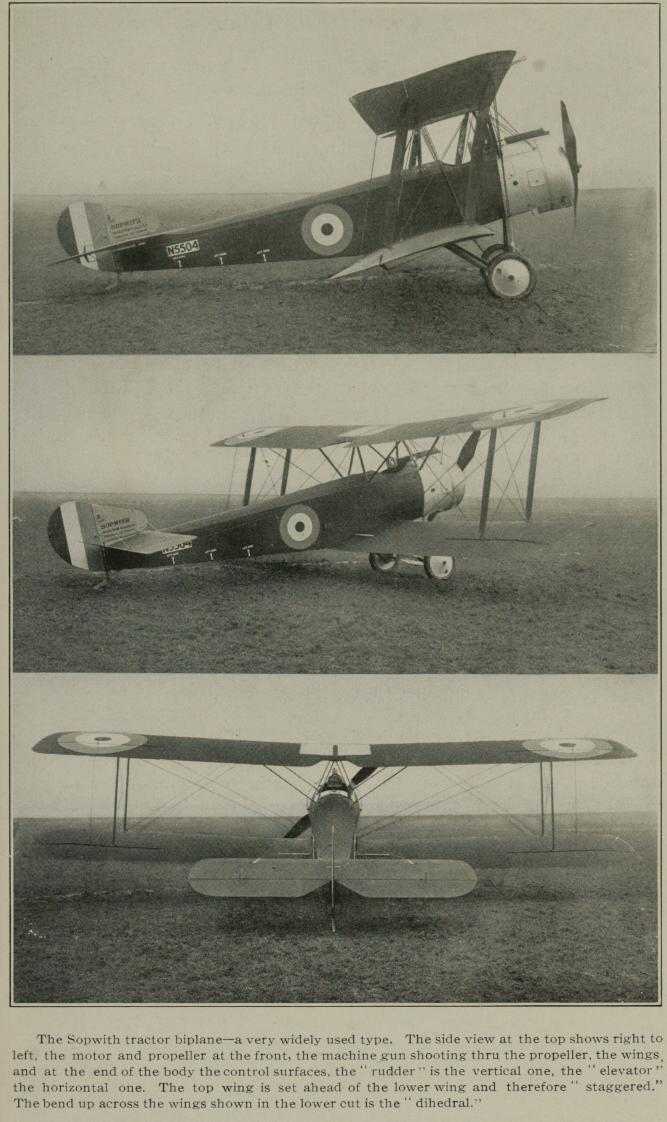
  Three views of the single-seat bomber version of the Sopwith 1½ Strutter
- Sopwith 1½ Strutter
- Sopwith Pup
- Sopwith Triplane
- Sopwith L.R.T.Tr.
- Sopwith Hispano-Suiza Triplane
- Sopwith Bee
- Sopwith Camel
- Sopwith B.1
- Sopwith Hippo
- Sopwith Cobham Twin Engine Bomber
- Sopwith AT "Aerial Target" – radio controlled guided missile
- Sopwith Dragon
- Sopwith Snipe
- Sopwith Dolphin
- Sopwith Salamander
- Sopwith Cuckoo
- Sopwith Bulldog
- Sopwith Buffalo
- Sopwith Rhino
- Sopwith Scooter
- Sopwith Swallow
- Sopwith Snail
- Sopwith Snapper
- Sopwith Snark

=== Post World War I ===
- Sopwith Gnu
- Sopwith 1919 Schneider Cup Seaplane
- Sopwith Atlantic
- Sopwith Antelope
- Sopwith Wallaby
- Sopwith Rainbow racer
- Sopwith Grasshopper

== See also ==
- List of aircraft manufacturers
