= RAF Castle Camps =

Former RAF Base in Cambridgeshire, England

RAF Castle Camps
- Near Castle Camps, Cambridgeshire in England

Site information
- Type: Royal Air Force satellite station 1940 & 1941-42 & 1943- Parent station 1942-43
- Code: CC
- Owner: Air Ministry
- Operator: Royal Air Force
- Controlled by: RAF Fighter Command * No. 11 Group RAF

Location
- Shown within Cambridgeshire RAF Castle Camps (the United Kingdom)
- Coordinates: 52°03′05″N 000°22′43″E

Site history
- Built: 1940
- Built by: John Laing & Son Ltd
- In use: June 1940 – January 1946
- Battles/wars: European theatre of World War II

Airfield information
- Elevation: 127 metres (417 ft) AMSL
Runways
| Direction | Length and surface |
|---|---|
| 00/00 | Tarmac |
| 00/00 | Tarmac |
| 00/00 | Tarmac |

Royal Air Force Castle Camps or more simply RAF Castle Camps is a former Royal Air Force satellite station, it was listed as being in Cambridgeshire as it is close to its namesake Cambridgeshire village. It is very near the Suffolk border and the airfield straddled the Essex and Cambridgeshire county border. Construction of the station was started in September 1939. It opened as a satellite of RAF Debden in June 1940 and became a satellite of RAF North Weald in July 1943.

During the Battle of Britain, one of the units operating from Castle Camps was 85 Squadron, whose Hawker Hurricanes were commanded by Peter Townsend.

The airfield was used by numerous squadrons throughout the Second World War. In 1945, it was commanded by Battle of Britain ace Tim Vigors. It closed in January 1946.

== Operational Units and Aircraft ==
| Unit | From | To | Aircraft | Version | Notes |
|---|---|---|---|---|---|
| No. 85 Squadron RAF | 23 May 1940; 3 September 1940 | 19 August 1940; 5 September 1940 | Hawker Hurricane; Hawker Hurricane | I I | As a detachment. Full strength. |
| No. 73 Squadron RAF | 5 September 1940 | 6 November 1940 | Hawker Hurricane | I | |
| No. 157 Squadron RAF | 18 December 1941 | 15 March 1943 | de Havilland Mosquito | II | |
| No. 605 (County of Warwick) Squadron AAF | 15 March 1943 | 6 October 1943 | de Havilland Mosquito | II/VI | |
| No. 456 Squadron RAAF | 29 March 1943 | June 1943 | Bristol Beaufighter de Havilland Mosquito | IIF; II/VI | |
| No. 527 Squadron RAF | 15 June 1943 | 28 February 1944 | Bristol Blenheim; Hawker Hurricane de Havilland Hornet Moth | IV; I | Formed here. |
| No. 91 (Nigeria) Squadron RAF | 29 February 1944 | 17 March 1944 | Supermarine Spitfire | XII/XIV | |
| No. 486 Squadron RNZAF | 6 March 1944; 29 March 1944 | 21 March 1944; 29 April 1944 | Hawker Typhoon | IB | |
| No. 410 Squadron RCAF | 30 December 1943 | 29 April 1944 | de Havilland Mosquito | XIII | |
| No. 68 Squadron RAF | 23 June 1944 | 28 December 1944 | de Havilland Mosquito | XVII/XIX | |
| No. 151 Squadron RAF | 8 October 1944 | 19 November 1944 | de Havilland Mosquito | XXX | |
| No. 25 Squadron RAF | 27 October 1944 | 14 July 1945 | de Havilland Mosquito | XXX/VI | |
| No. 307 Squadron RAF | 27 January 1945 | 31 May 1945 | de Havilland Mosquito | XXX | |

The following units were also here at some point:

- No. 25 (Base) Defence Wing RAF (March – May 1944)
- No. 85 Group Communication Squadron RAF (May – June 1944)
- No. 149 Airfield Headquarters RAF (March – April 1944)
- No. 2771 Squadron RAF Regiment
- No. 2879 Squadron RAF Regiment
- No. 2887 Squadron RAF Regiment

== Current use ==
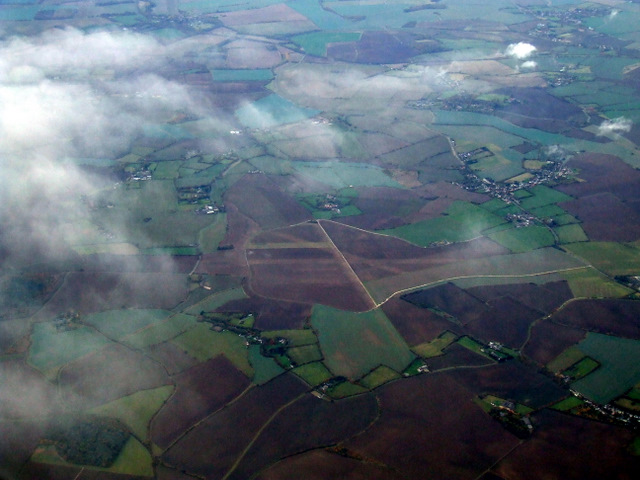
Site of RAF Castle Camps from the air in 2011

The site has reverted to agricultural use. However the outlines of portions of the runways in the fields (when viewed on Google Earth), can still be seen and some of the perimeter roads are even now in use as farm tracks.

Some of the airfield buildings are still present and being used by local farms and industry.
