= List of aircraft (So) =

This is a list of aircraft in alphabetical order beginning with 'So'.

== So ==
=== Soaring Concepts ===
(Sturgis, Michigan, United States)

- Soaring Concepts Sky Trek

=== SOBEH ===
(Stichting voor Ontwikkeling en Bouw van Experimenteel Hefschroefvligtuig)

- SOBEH H-2

=== SOCATA ===
(SOciété de Construction d'Avions de Tourisme et d'Affaires)

- SOCATA ST 10 Diplomate
- SOCATA Rallye
- SOCATA TB-9 Tampico
- SOCATA TB-10 Tobago
- SOCATA TB-11 – Powered by a 134-kW (180-hp) engine.
- SOCATA TB-15 – Proposed version. Not built.
- SOCATA TB-16 – Proposed version. Not built.
- SOCATA TB-20 Trinidad
- SOCATA TB-21 Trinidad
- SOCATA TB-30 Epsilon
- SOCATA TB-60
- SOCATA TB-200 Tobago XL
- SOCATA TB-360 Tangara
- SOCATA TBM-700
- SOCATA TBM-850
- SOCATA TBM-900
- SOCATA Gabier
- SOCATA 110ST Galopin
- SOCATA Garnement
- SOCATA Gaucho
- SOCATA Guerrier
- SOCATA Gulfstream
- SOCATA Horizon

=== Sochen ===
(Edwin Sochen)

- Sochen Phoenix

=== Södertelge ===
(Södertelge Verkstäde)

- Södertelge Verkstäder SW 15
- Södertelge Verkstäder SW 16

=== Softex-Aero ===
- Softex-Aero V-24
- Softex-Aero V-51

=== Soigneux ===
(A. Soigneux)

- Soigneux Monocoupe

=== SOKO ===
- Soko 522
- Soko G-2 Galeb
- Soko G-3 Galeb
- Soko G-4 Super Galeb
- Soko J-20 Kraguj
- Soko J-21 Jastreb
- Soko J-22 Orao
- Soko S-55

=== Sokol ===
- Sokol F-15 Peregrine

=== Sokopf ===
(Innsbruck, Austria)

- Sokopf Falke

=== Solar ===
(Solar Aircraft Co (fdr: Edmund T Price), 1212 Juniper Ave, San Diego, CA)

- Solar MS-1
- Solar MS-2

=== Solar-Powered Aircraft Developments ===
- Solar One

=== Solar Wings ===
(a division of P&M Aviation)

- Solar Wings Ace
- Solar Wings Breeze
- Solar Wings Fever
- Solar Wings Rumour
- Solar Wings Rush
- Solar Wings Scandal
- Solar Wings Storm
- Solar Wings Typhoon
- Solar Wings Whisper

=== Solaris ===
(Solaris Aviation)

- Solaris Sigma

=== Soldenhoff ===
(Alexander Soldenhoff)

- Soldenhoff So.A1
- Soldenhoff So.A2
- Soldenhoff So.A3
- Soldenhoff So.A4
- Soldenhoff So.A5
- Soldenhoff So.S5

=== Solid Air ===
(Solid Air UL-Bau Franz GmbH, Rheinland-Pfalz, Germany)

- Solid Air Diamant LP
- Solid Air Diamant Twin

=== Solo Wings ===
(Solo Wings CC, Gillitts, KwaZulu-Natal, South Africa)

- Solo Wings Aquilla
- Solo Wings Windlass

=== Soloy ===
( Soloy Aviation Solutions)

- Soloy Pathfinder 21

=== Sol Paragliders ===
(Jaraguá do Sul, Brazil)

- Sol Atmus
- Sol Auster
- Sol Axion
- Sol Balance
- Sol Caesar
- Sol Classic
- Sol Cyclone
- Sol Dynamic
- Sol Eclipse
- Sol Ellus
- Sol Flexus
- Sol Hercules
- Sol Hoops
- Sol Impulse
- Sol Jumbo
- Sol Kangaroo
- Sol Koala
- Sol Kuat
- Sol Lotus
- Sol Magic Fun
- Sol Neon
- Sol Onyx
- Sol Pero
- Sol Prymus
- Sol Quasar
- Sol One
- Sol Sonic
- Sol Faly Stabilis
- Sol Start
- Sol Super Sonic
- Sol Syncross
- Sol Synergy
- Sol Taxi
- Sol Torck
- Sol Tornado
- Sol TR2
- Sol Tracer
- Sol Unno
- Sol Vello
- Sol Yaris
- Sol Yess

=== Solution F ===
- Solution F / Chretien electric helicopter

=== Sombold ===
- Sombold So 344 Schußjäger

=== Somers-Kendall ===
- Somers-Kendall SK-1

=== Somerville ===
(William E Somerville, Coal City, IL)

- Somerville 1910 Monoplane
- Somerville 1912 Biplane

=== Sommer ===
(Deutsche Sommer-Werke)

- Sommer 1910 biplane
- Sommer Hoch-Tiefs Doppeldecker 1912
- Sommer monoplane

=== Sonaca ===
(Sonaca Aircraft)

- Sonaca 200

=== Sondag-Pavia-Domecq ===
(Sondag-Pavia-Domecq)

- Sondag-Domecq-Pavia Sopado

=== Sonex ===
- Sonex Aircraft Onex
- Sonex Aircraft Sonex
- Sonex Aircraft Waiex
- Sonex Aircraft Xenos
- Sonex Aircraft SubSonex
- Sonex Aircraft Teros (UAV)

=== Sonoda ===
(Takehiko Sonoda)

- Sonoda 1912 Aeroplane

=== Sons ===
(John A Sons, Humble, TX)

- Sons Trainer

=== Sopwith ===
- Sopwith-Wright biplane
- Sopwith 1½ Strutter
- Sopwith 3-Seater
- Sopwith Admiralty Type 137
- Sopwith Admiralty Type 138
- Sopwith Admiralty Type 806
- Sopwith Admiralty Type 807 Folder Seaplane
- Sopwith Admiralty Type 860
- Sopwith Antelope
- Sopwith Anzani Tractor Seaplane (HT)
- Sopwith AT (Aerial Torpedo)
- Sopwith Atlantic
- Sopwith B.1
- Sopwith Baby
- Sopwith Bat Boat
- Sopwith Bee
- Sopwith Buffalo
- Sopwith Bulldog
- Sopwith Camel
- Sopwith Cobham
- Sopwith Cuckoo
- Sopwith Dragon
- Sopwith Dolphin
- Sopwith Dove
- Sopwith Gnu
- Sopwith Gordon-Bennet racer
- Sopwith Grasshopper
- Sopwith Greek Seaplane
- Sopwith Gun Bus
- Sopwith L.R.T.Tr.
- Sopwith Hippo
- Sopwith Hispano-Suiza Triplane
- Sopwith Hydro Tractor (HT) – also known as "Sopwith Tractor Waterplane"
- Sopwith Pup
- Sopwith Pusher
- Sopwith Rainbow
- Sopwith Rhino
- Sopwith Salamander
- Sopwith Schneider 1913
- Sopwith Schneider 1919
- Sopwith Scooter
- Sopwith SL.T.B.P.
- Sopwith Snail
- Sopwith Snapper
- Sopwith Snark
- Sopwith Snipe
- Sopwith Sparrow
- Sopwith Swallow
- Sopwith Tabloid
- Sopwith Triplane
- Sopwith Two-Seat Scout
- Sopwith Type C (Special torpedo seaplane Type C)
- Sopwith Type D
- Sopwith Wallaby

=== Sorenson ===
(Keith Sorenson, Van Nuys, CA)

- Sorenson Special

=== Sorrell ===
(Otto Sorrell, Rochester, WA)

- Sorrell Bathtub
- Sorrell Colt

=== Sorrell Aviation ===
(Hobart C Sorrell & Sons (John, Mark, Tim), Tenino, Washington, United States )

- Sorrell Biggy Rat
- Sorrell DFG-1
- Sorrell Dr.1
- Sorrell Golden Condor
- Sorrell Intruder
- Sorrell Nieuport 17
- Sorrell SNS-2 Guppy
- Sorrell SNS-4
- Sorrell SNS-6 Hiperbipe
- Sorrell SNS-7 Hiperbipe
- Sorrell SNS-8 Hiperlight
- Sorrell SNS-9 Hiperlight
- Sorrell Hiperlight EXP
- Sorrell EXP II
- Sorrell-Robinson Wenoso
- Sorrell-Robinson Cool Crow

=== Société Nouvelle d'Aviation Sportive ===
(Stryke-Air, Noillac, France)

- SNAS Stryke-Air Bi
- SNAS Stryke-Air Monoplace

=== Southampton University ===
- SUMPAC

=== Southern Aeronautical Corporation ===
(Southern Aeronautical Corporation, Miami Lakes, Florida, United States)

- Southern Aeronautical Renegade
- Southern Aeronautical Scamp

=== Southern ===
(Southern Aircraft Co. / Glenn E. Messer / Messer Aeronautical Industries Inc.)

- Southern Air Boss

=== Southern ===
(Southern Commercial Aircraft Co (founders: Walter & Merle Krouse), Hialeah, FL)

- Southern Sea Hawk

=== Southern ===
(Southern Aircraft Company)

- Southern Martlet
- Southern Metal Martlet

=== Southern ===
(Southern Commercial Airmotive Corp, Dothan, AL)

- Southern 1950 Biplane

=== Southern ===
(Southern Aircraft Div, Portable Products Corp (pres: Willis C Brown), Garland and Greenville, TX)

- Southern Aerocar
- Southern BM-10
- Southern BM-11
- Southernaire
- Southernaire Model II
- Southern XC-1

=== Southern Aircraft ===
(Fleet Southern Aircraft Inc, Travis Field, Savannah, GA)

- Southern Fleet Super-V

=== Southern Crane ===
(Manncraft Airplane Co (pres: H W Mann), Collierville (Memphis), TN)

- Southern Crane 1929 Monoplane

=== Southern Cross ===
- Southern Cross Aviation SC-1

=== Southern Eagle ===
(Southern Eagles Avn Club, Baltimore, MD)

- Southern Eagle A

=== Southern Pacific ===
(Southern Pacific Aircraft corp, Santa Monica, CA)

- Southern Pacific Dragonfly

=== Southern Powered Parachutes ===
(Nicholson, GA), (formerly called Condor Powered Parachutes)

- Southern Condor
- Southern Raptor

=== Southern Skies ===
(Southern Skies, LLC, Taylorsville, North Carolina, United States)

- Southern Skies Spymotor
- Southern Skies Quattro

=== Sowers-Haugsted ===
(Marcellus Sowers & C Haugsted, Nevada, IA)

- Sowers-Haugsted Sportplane

=== Southwest Research Institute ===
- Southwest Research Institute HiSentinel 80

=== Soyer-Barritault ===
- Soyer-Barritault SB1
