= Bateleur (disambiguation) =

A bateleur is a medium-sized eagle.

Bateleur may also refer to:

- Bateleur Aquilla, ultralight trike aircraft
- Bateleur Sky Sports, a US aircraft distributor active in the late 1990s and early 2000s
- Bateleur Windlass, ultralight trike aircraft
- Denel Aerospace Systems Bateleur, an unmanned aerial vehicle
- RMT Bateleur, a German light-sport aircraft
- Bateleur FV2 An improved version of the Valkiri, a multiple rocket launcher
