= V51 =

V51 may refer to:

- DB Class V 51, a German locomotive
- Softex-Aero V-51, a Ukrainian helicopter
- Vanadium-51, an isotope of vanadium
- Vultee V-51, a trainer aircraft prototype
