= Espenlaub (automobile) =

The Espenlaub line of automobiles was a series of innovative and unusual vehicles created by Gottlob Espenlaub, a German inventor, between 1928 and 1953. Although Espenlaub was mainly known for his work on gliders and rocket propulsion, he also worked as a pioneer of aerodynamics and lightweight construction. The early experimental cars were unusual and unique. Plans to launch a range of elegant, sporty coupés in the early 1950s fell through for economic reasons, and only a few pre-production vehicles were available for testing.

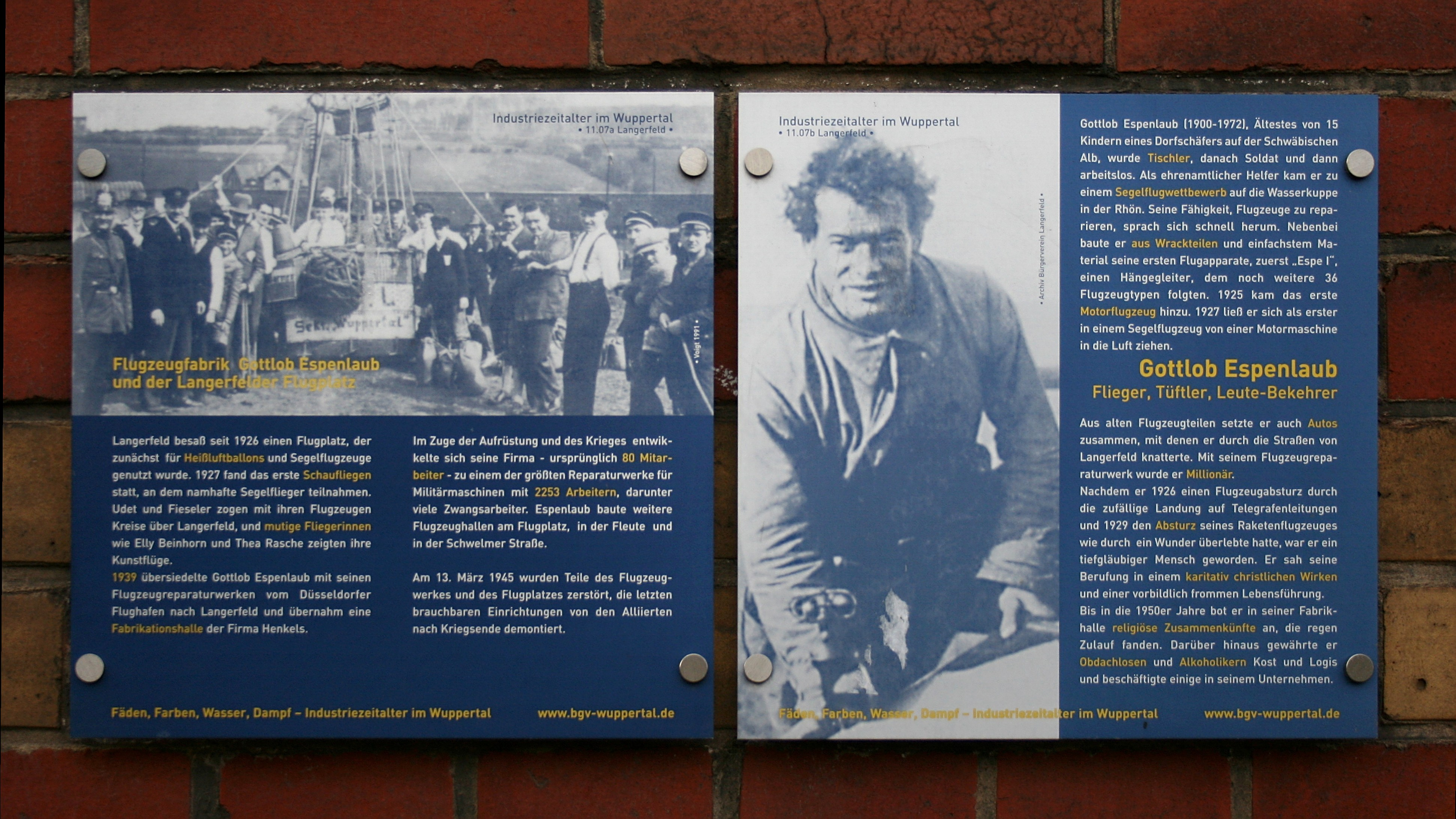
Information boards about the former aircraft factory, photographed in Wuppertal-Langerfeld
