= SNAS =

SNAS may refer to:

- Satellite Navigation Augmentation System, a proposed Chinese space-based navigation system
- Singapore National Academy of Science
- Société Nouvelle d'Aviation Sportive, a French aircraft manufacturer of the 2000s
- Sudanese National Academy of Sciences
- Systemic Nickel Allergy Syndrome, a form of nickel allergy
