= Vomperbach =

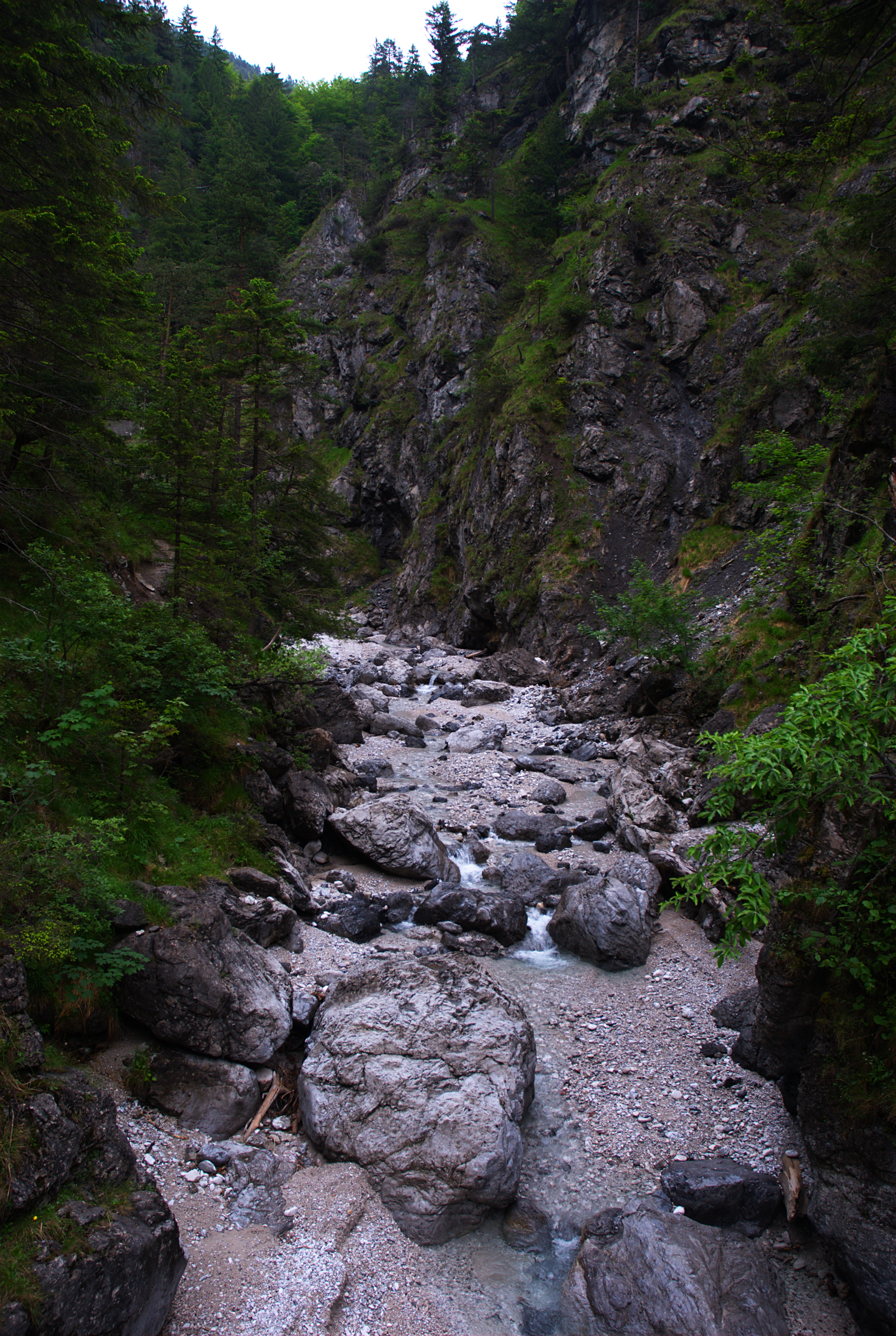
- The Vomperbach in the Vomper Loch

Location
- Country: Austria
- State: Tyrol

Physical characteristics
- Source
  - location: Karwendel mountain range
- Mouth
  - location: Between Vomp and Terfens into the Inn
  - coordinates: 47.3243°N 11.6791°E
- Length: 17.2 km (10.7 mi)

Basin features
- Progression: Inn→ Danube→ Black Sea

The Vomperbach is a river of Tyrol, Austria, a tributary of the Inn.

The Vomperbach rises in the Karwendel mountain range, close to the source of the Isar and flows first from west to east. In the Vomper Loch, a tributary valley of the Inn that is partly a ravine, the Vomperbach changes its course southward and finally passes as boundary between the villages of Vomp and Terfens, where it discharges into the Inn. It has a length of 17 kilometres (11 mi).

== Water quality ==
In its upper course in the Vomper Loch, the river is partly covered by detrital, therefore almost invisible and a water quality cannot be measured. Below until its mouth the water quality remains constantly grade A and provides the villages with drinking water.
