= Solid Air (disambiguation) =

Solid Air is a 1973 album by John Martyn.

Solid Air may also refer to:

- Solid Air UL-Bau Franz, a German aircraft manufacturer
- Aerogel, or "solid air", a synthetic porous ultralight material
- Solid Air, a 2003 film by May Miles Thomas
