= Sol Paragliders =

Brazilian aircraft manufacturer

- Company type: Privately held company
- Industry: Aerospace
- Founded: 1979
- Founder: Ary Carlos Pradi
- Headquarters: Jaraguá do Sul, Brazil
- Products: Paragliders
- Number of employees: 200 (2026)
- Website: www.solparagliders.com.br

Sol Paragliders (Sun Paragliders) is a Brazilian aircraft manufacturer based in Jaraguá do Sul and founded by Ary Carlos Pradi. The company specializes in the design and manufacture of paragliders and paramotor wings in the form of ready-to-fly aircraft. The company also produces paragliding harnesses, rescue parachutes and accessories.

== History ==
The company was founded in 1979 as a hang glider manufacturer and started building paragliders in 1991 under the name FUN Gliders. By 1993, 70% of their business was for export. The company name was changed to Sol Paragliders in 1996 and shortly thereafter the company started a partnership with Nova Performance Paragliders of Austria. By 1999 the company had its own design and certification staff and decided to take its brand globally without partners. Between 2000 and 2010 pilots flying Sol gliders set 15 world records. In 2004 the company was certified by the German Deutscher Hängegleiterverband e.V. (DHV)

Sol's Super Sonic established itself as a leading design for flying paraglider aerobatics, with its introduction in 2005. In 2009 Kamira Pereira set four new women's world records on Sol gliders, while Horacio Llorens set the world record spins with 281 set in Nepal, an achievement that got widespread news coverage. The Sol Tracer was a highly competitive design and Frank Brown was named Brazilian champion for the ninth time and Kamira Pereira women's champion for the fifth time flying the design. In 2011 the company won an Innovation Award of the Year for its Sol One design. In 2012 four more world records were set on Sol gliders.

The company also has a museum that was opened on 18 February 2011.

In 2004 the company had about 50 employees. By 2010 that had grown to 120 employees, of whom 22 were paraglider pilots.

== Aircraft ==
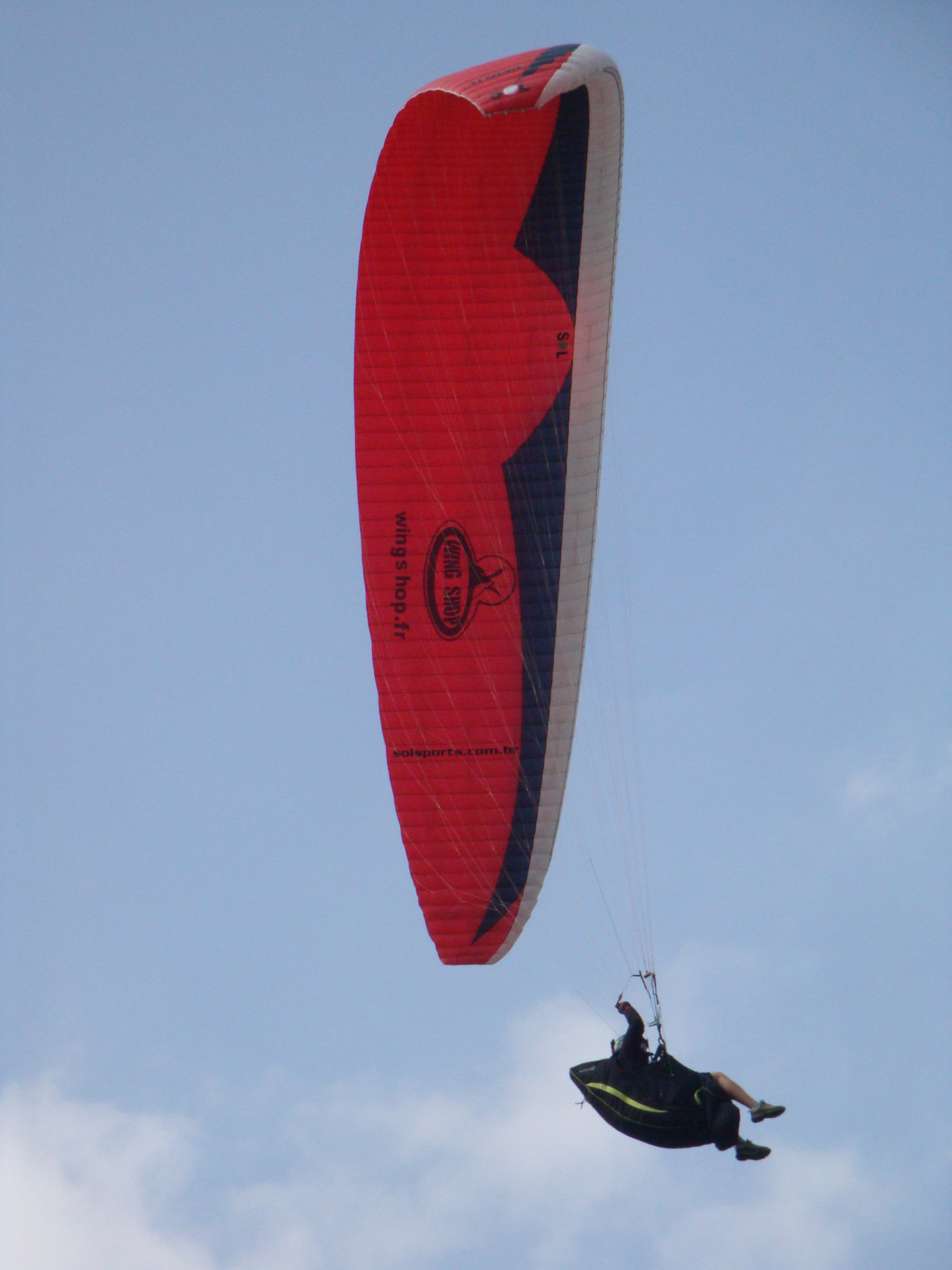
Sol Tracer paraglider

Summary of aircraft built by Sol:

- Sol Atmus
- Sol Auster
- Sol Axion
- Sol Balance
- Sol Caesar
- Sol Classic
- Sol Cyclone
- Sol Dynamic
- Sol Eclipse
- Sol Ellus
- Sol Flexus
- Sol Hercules
- Sol Hoops
- Sol Impulse
- Sol Jumbo
- Sol Kangaroo
- Sol Koala
- Sol Kuat
- Sol Lotus
- Sol Magic Fun
- Sol Neon
- Sol Onyx
- Sol Pero
- Sol Prymus
- Sol Quasar
- Sol One
- Sol Sonic
- Sol Faly Stabilis
- Sol Start
- Sol Super Sonic
- Sol Syncross
- Sol Synergy
- Sol Taxi
- Sol Torck
- Sol Tornado
- Sol TR2
- Sol Tracer
- Sol Unno
- Sol Vello
- Sol Yaris
- Sol Yess
- Sol Sycross
- Sol Auster gt
- Sol Runner
