= Nova Performance Paragliders =

Austrian aircraft manufacturer

- Company type: Privately held company
- Industry: Aerospace
- Founded: 1989
- Founder: Hannes Papesh
- Headquarters: Terfens, Austria
- Key people: Hermann Habe, Toni Bender
- Products: Paragliders
- Number of employees: 110
- Website: www.nova.eu

Nova Performance Paragliders is an Austrian aircraft manufacturer based in Terfens. The company specializes in the design and manufacture of paragliders in the form of ready-to-fly aircraft.

The company was founded in 1989 and originally located in Innsbruck. In 2010 the company relocated its headquarters to Terfens. By 2016 the company had 110 employees, including 95 in the Mecsek Ballon KFT Hungarian production plant in Pécs and 15 in Terfens.

The company's first designer was Hannes Papesh. Other founders were Hermann Habe and competitive paraglider pilot Toni Bender.

== History ==
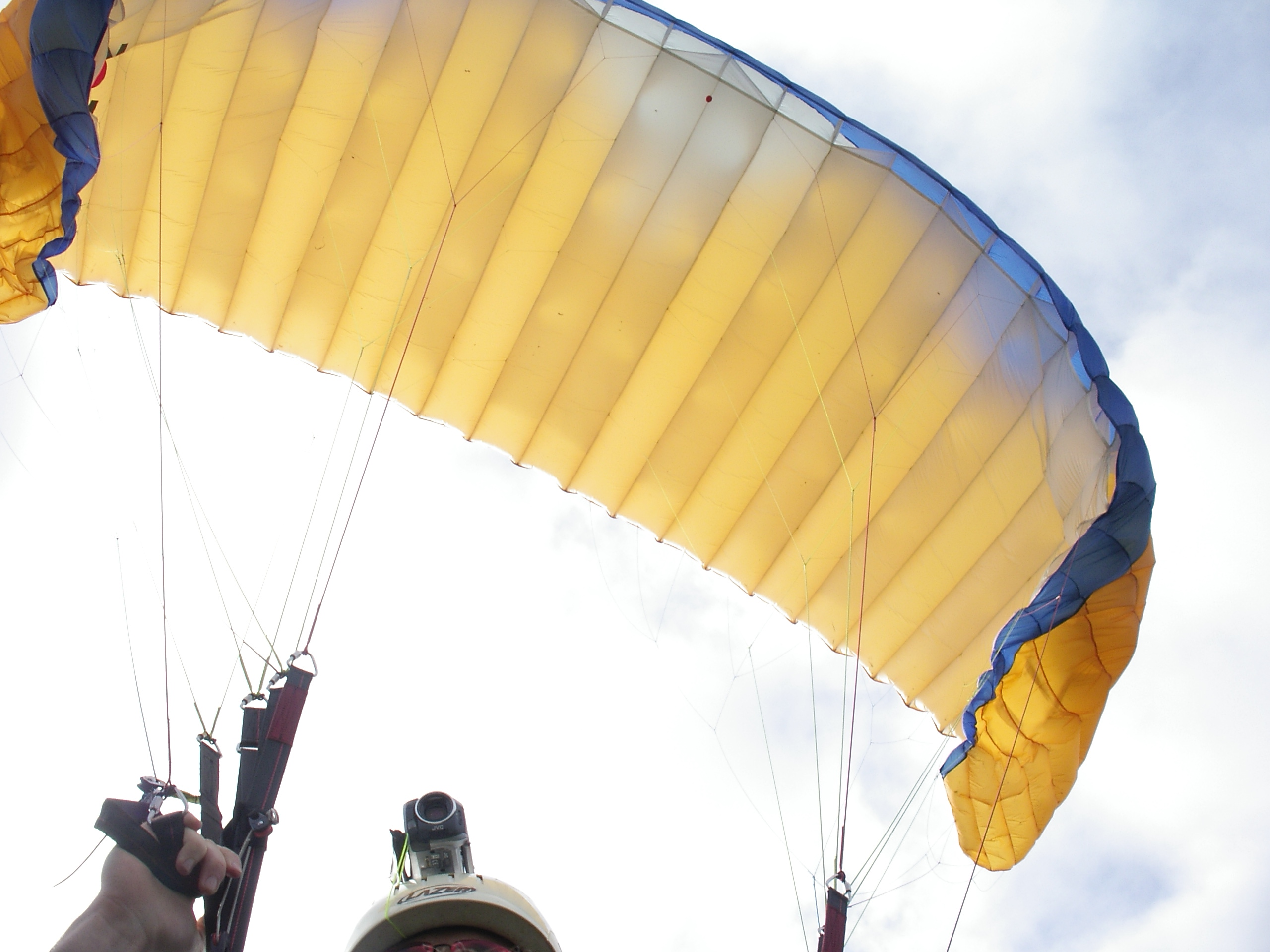
Nova paraglider performing big ears.

The company's first design, the Nova CXC was sewn by Papesh on his mother's home sewing machine. The company initially operated from Wolfgang Lechner's apartment.

In 1990 the company established a manufacturing relationship with Mecsek Ballon KFT in the Hungarian town of Pécs to take on production. In the communist era Mecsek Ballon had been a balloon and mountaineer clothing manufacturer.

Glider development was not without problems. In 1992 the Nova Phantom developed technical problems that could not be easily resolved and was replaced in the line by the Nova Phönix.

Paraglider pilot Christian Heinrich won the 1999 World Paragliding Championships, held in Bramberg am Wildkogel, Austria, flying a Nova Krypton, although the contest was not validated, due to poor weather.

The Nova Argon introduced in 2000 was DHV certified with unsheathed Kevlar lines, which greatly reduced drag in flight. The introduction of the Nova Carbon in 2001 resulted in delays filling customer orders as demand exceeded the ability of the fabric manufacturer to provide the cloth for construction. In 2002 The Carbon wing developed porosity in the field after delivery to customers, resulting in parachute-like descents. The fault lay with a batch of fabric which the fabric manufacturer had sub-contracted to a new factory and which had produced a sub-standard product. Nova replaced 65 Carbon wings of the 1440 sold that had developed issues.

By the mid-2000s the company had a full line of gliders, including the beginner Phorus, intermediate Pheron and Artax, performance Aeron and Radon, plus the two-place flight training Phor.

In 2003 Hungarian paraglider pilot Szilard Forgo flew a new world record to a declared goal of 278.3 km (172.9 mi) flying a Nova Aeron in Brazil.

The 2008 contest season XContest resulted in the Nova Mentor being flown by the first-, third-, fourth-, seventh- and eighth-place finishers.

In 2011 the Nova Mentor 2 dominated the standard class in the DHV league, with Mentor 2 pilots taking seven of the top ten places. In the XContest nine of the top ten gliders flown were Mentor 2s, including the top three.

On the 10 May 2012, Werner Luidolt flew the 200 km mark (223.90 km) on a Nova Ion 2 and won 5,135 euros in the ION 2-Hundred Challenge. The Nova Mentor was also successful in standard class competition. Pilot Hans Tockner even won the Austrian XC championships on a Mentor 2.

In 2012 the Nova SuSi was also introduced. The SuSi (SuperSimple) is a simple design with an emphasis on simple construction, benign flying characteristics and a high degree of safety.

2013 the next version of the Nova Mentor came to market: The Mentor 3. Hans Tockner again won all classes of the Austrian XC league and also flew an FAI triangle of over 263 km on 16 July 2013. Christoph Bessei became the German XC champion in the Standard and Junior class on his Nova Mentor. Urs Haari won the Swiss Standard and Sports class on a Nova Mentor 3. Mauro Pianaro won the Sports class of the Italian cross-country championships on a Nova Factor 2.

On 8 June 2014, Berni Pessl flew the first FAI triangle over 300 km ever done on an EN-B paraglider using his Nova Mentor 3. In 2014 designer and Nova co-founder Hannes Papesh left the company after 25 years. Philipp Medicus took over the position of head designer.

In 2015 Nova expanded and opened a paraglider factory in Vietnam. Team pilot Robert Schaller and his Nova Prion 3 flew the first FAI triangle over 200 km (124 mi), completing 209.2 km (130 mi).

In 2016 the Nova Phantom was introduced to the market. In Brazil, Joe Edlinger flew 435 km open distance on the Phantom, which was a world record in the EN-B class.

The Nova Mentor 5 came out in 2017. Berni Pessl won the XContest.org world-wide standard class ranking, for the fourth time in a row.

The EN-C wing Nova Sector came out in 2018. Also, Nova introduced the Nova Pentagon, which was the first five-sided parachute.

2019, Nova was 30 years old and introduced a new wing design. Also NOVA published the first issue of the house magazine Airtime. The Nova Mentor 6, Nova Mentor 6 Light, Nova Doubleskin and Nova Bantam came out in 2019. Also in 2019, a world record for tandem paragliding was set of 233.23 km (145 mi), flown by Nova Team Pilot Stefan Lauth and his wife. The flight with the Nova Bion 2 began at the Grente and lasted for nine hours.

In 2020, Nova introduced the high end EN-A Nova Aonic wing. In the EN-B class the Nova Ion 6 came out. Nova's first reversible harness, the Itus was introduced.

== Aircraft ==
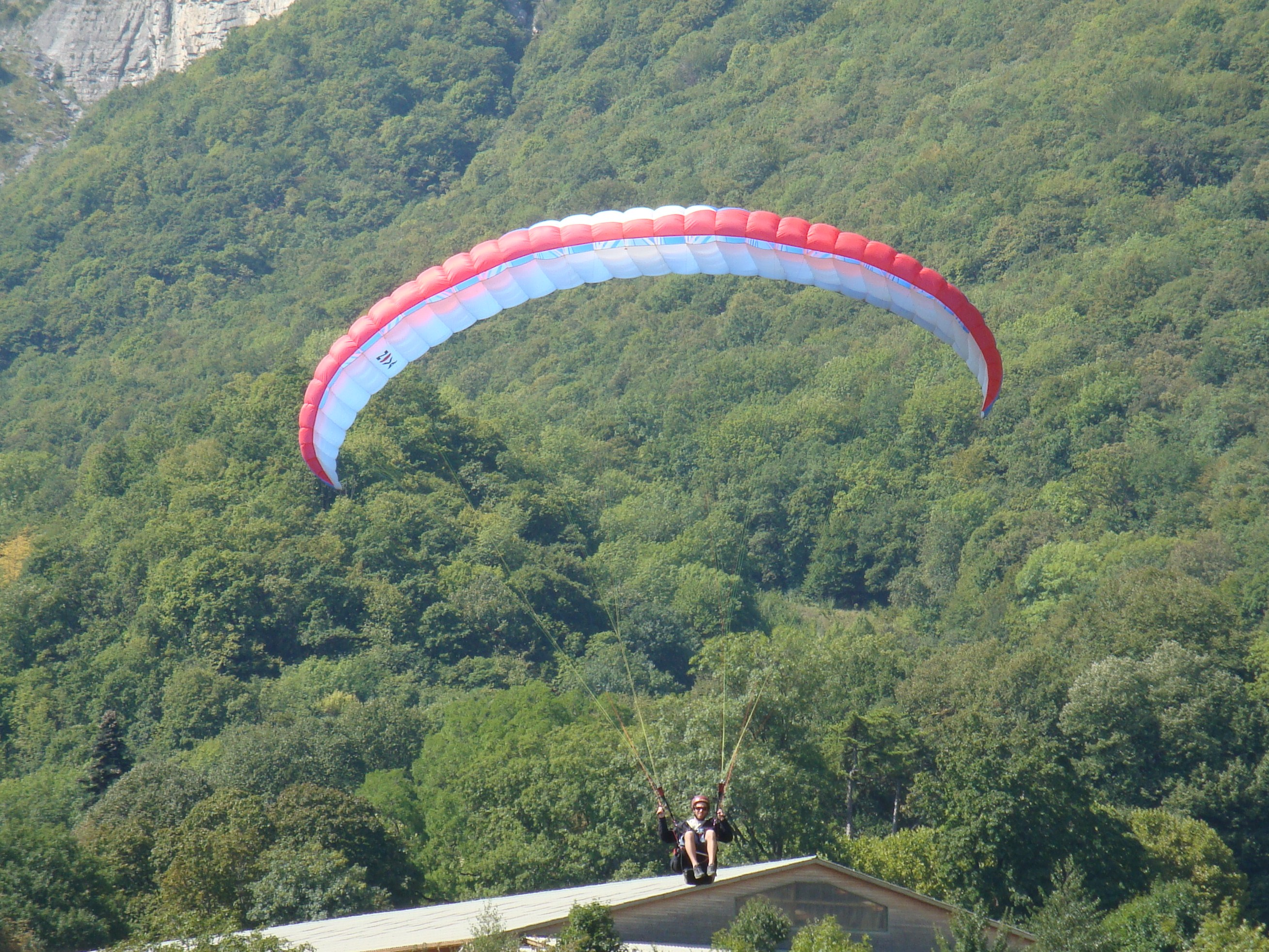
Nova Primax

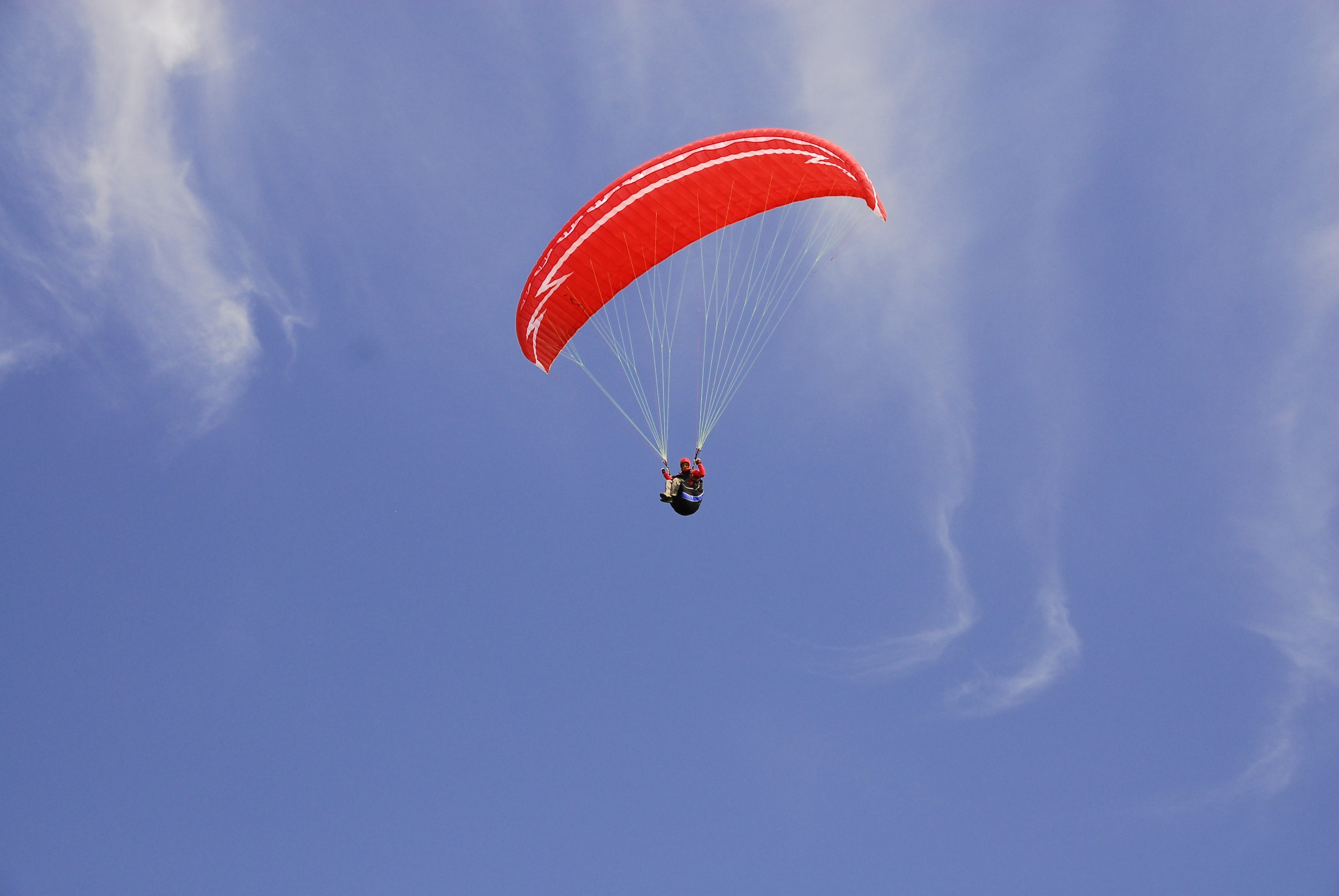
Nova Mentor

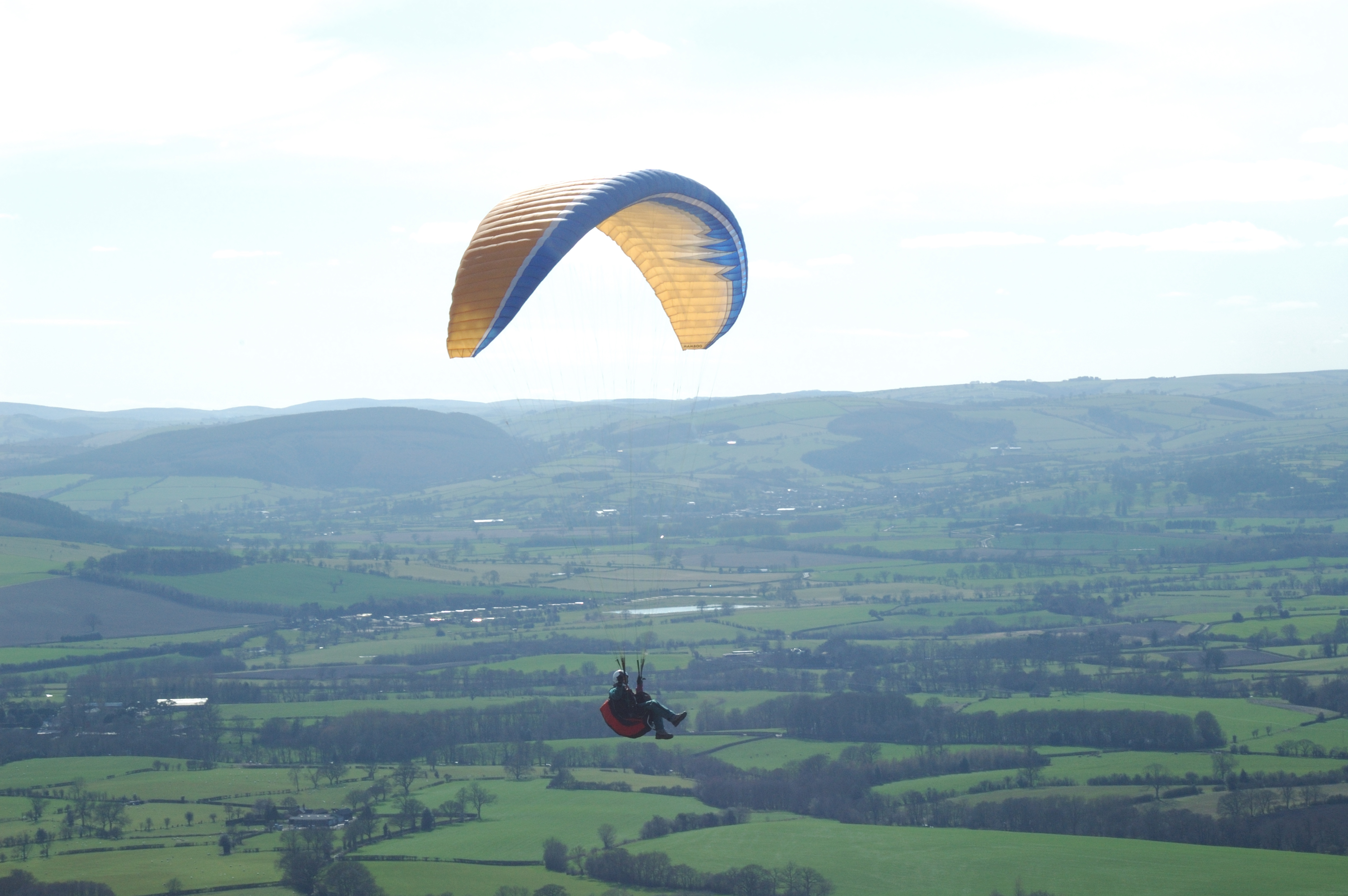
Nova Mamboo

Summary of aircraft built by Nova:

- Nova Aeron
- Nova Aonic
- Nova Argon
- Nova Artax
- Nova Axon
- Nova Bantam
- Nova Bion
- Nova Carbon
- Nova CXC
- Nova Doubleskin
- Nova Factor
- Nova Glitch
- Nova Ibex
- Nova Ion
- Nova Ion Light
- Nova Jamboo
- Nova Krypton
- Nova Mamboo
- Nova Mentor
- Nova Mentor Light
- Nova Oryx
- Nova Phantom
- Nova Pheron
- Nova Philou
- Nova Phocus
- Nova Phönix
- Nova Phor
- Nova Phorus
- Nova Primax
- Nova Prion
- Nova RA
- Nova Radon
- Nova Rookie
- Nova Rotor
- Nova Sector
- Nova Shockwave
- Nova Speedmax
- Nova Susi
- Nova Susi Q
- Nova Syntax
- Nova Tattoo
- Nova Trend
- Nova Triton
- Nova Tycoon
- Nova X-ACT
- Nova Xenon
- Nova Xyon
