= Terfens =

- Municipality
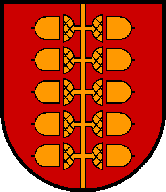
- Coat of arms

- Location within Austria
- Coordinates: 47°19′34″N 11°38′46″E
- Country: Austria
- State: Tyrol
- District: Schwaz

Government
  - Mayor: Florian Gartlacher

Area
  - Total: 15.22 km^{2} (5.88 sq mi)
- Elevation: 591 m (1,939 ft)

Population (2018-01-01)
  - Total: 2,184
  - Density: 143.5/km^{2} (371.7/sq mi)
- Time zone: UTC+1 (CET)
  - Summer (DST): UTC+2 (CEST)
- Postal code: 6123
- Area code: 05224
- Vehicle registration: SZ
- Website: terfens.at

Terfens is a municipality in the Schwaz district with 2116 inhabitants in the Austrian state of Tyrol. It is located about 20 km northeast of Innsbruck in the Lower Inn Valley.

== Geography ==
Terfens lies in the Lower Inn Valley 20 km east of Innsbruck. The Inn forms the southern municipal boundary. On the north and east, the boundary is the brook of Vomperbach, which flows into the Inn. Between the two is the small lake Weißlahnsee.

== Heraldry ==
The arms were granted on September 3, 1974. The name is derived from a Celtic word for oak or acorn. The coat of arms contains five pairs of acorns fesswise in pale Or.

== Neighbouring municipalities ==
Neighbourghing municipalities of Terfens are Weer, Kolsass, Weerberg, Pill, Fritzens and Kolsassberg.

== Customs ==
The Chapel of Terfens (Bundesmusikkapelle Terfens), a traditional brass orchestra, was founded in 1796 in the course of the reopening of the Maria Larch church. In 2016, the chapel had 55 active musicians.

In autumn it is custom to do an Almabtrieb from Engalm via Lamsenjoch and the streets of Vomp to Terfens, that means the cows from the Alm are brought with traditional flower decoration on their heads to the village.

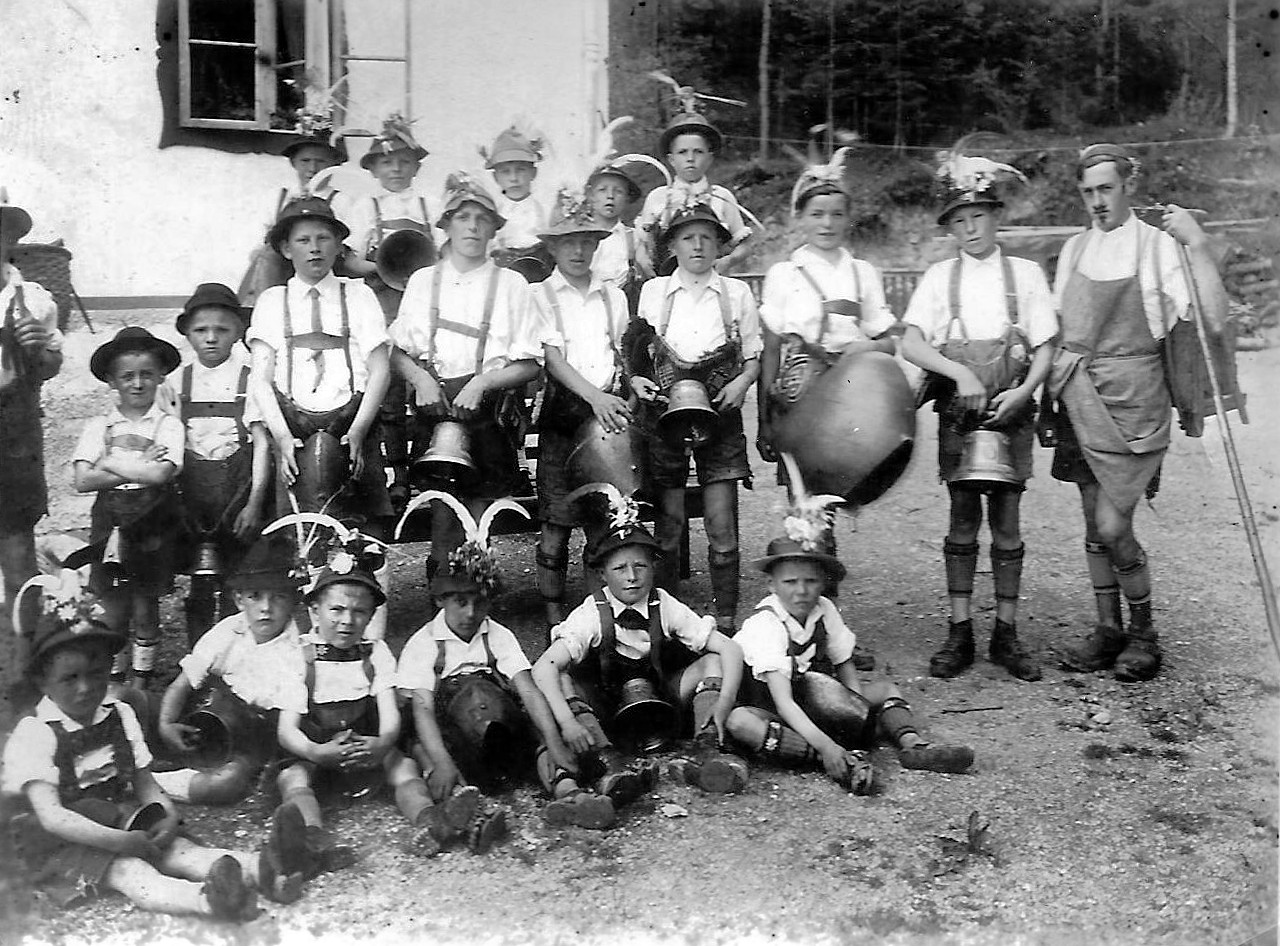
Grasausläuten in Terfens in the 1930s

Like in other municipalities of the district of Schwaz, there is the custom of Grasausläuten in spring. Boys of the village go through the village with bells in order to announce the end of winter.

== Architecture ==
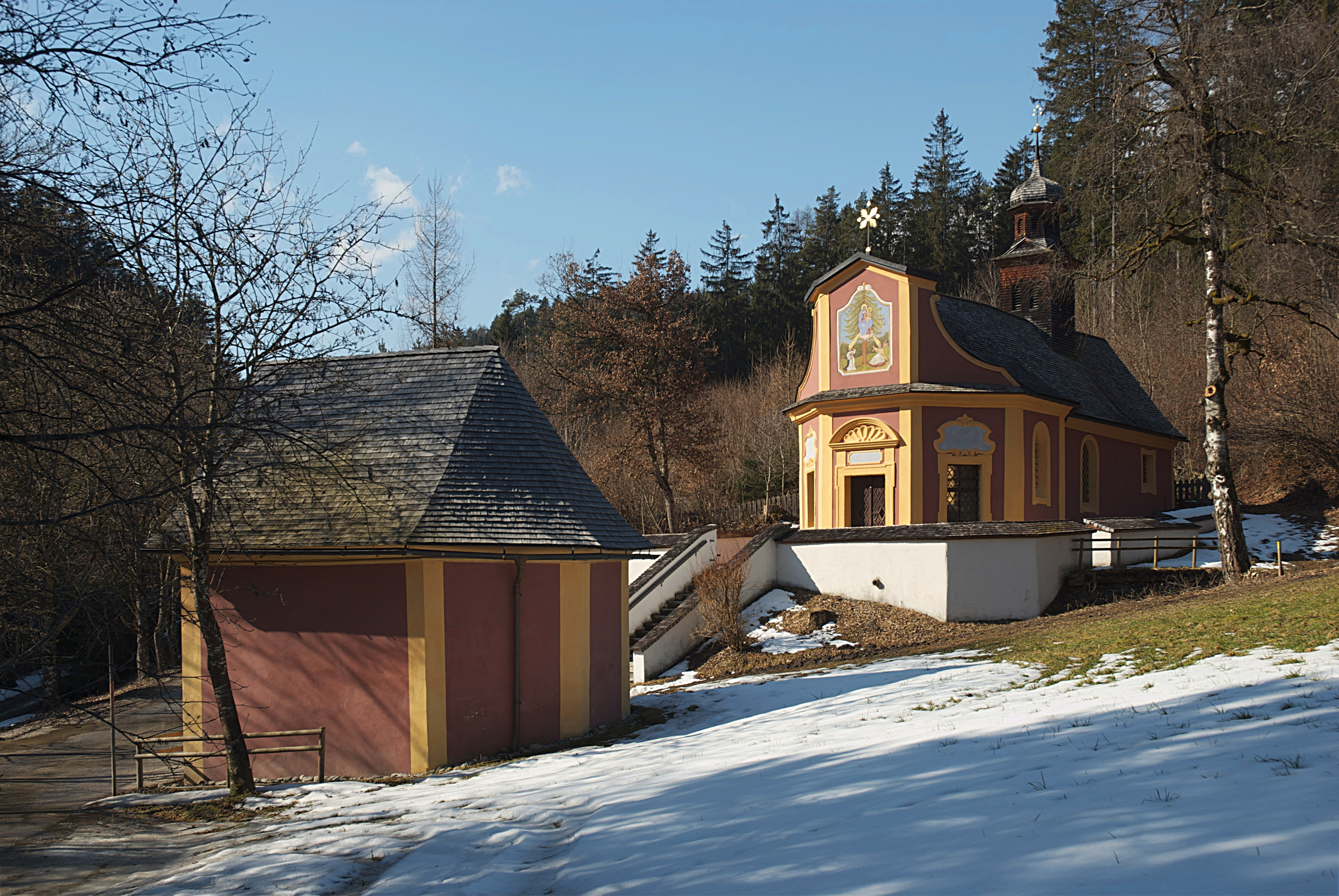
The church Maria Larch

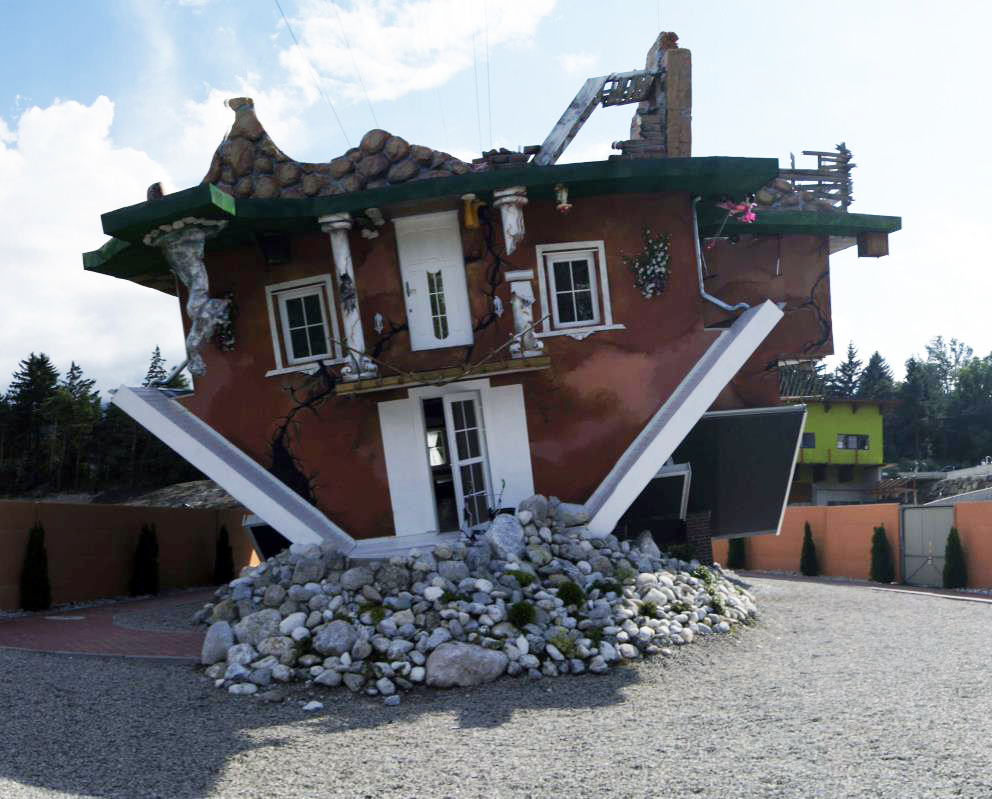
Upside-down house in Terfens

One of Terfens' major landmarks is the Maria Larch pilgrimage church. The church was founded in 1678 in the former location of a statue of the Virgin Mary attached to a larch tree. The statue originates in 1665; it was put there because a farmer's wife prayed to the larch tree and when she told the story to a hermit called Johann Weiss, he created the clay statue. The church was renovated in 1994.

Terfens is famous for having an upside-down house which has become a tourist attraction. It was built in 2012 by two Polish architects.

== Prominent figures ==
The spouses Paul Unterkircher and Karola Unterkircher, who committed bomb attacks in South Tyrol (Pfunderer Buam or Ein Tirol) with the goal of having South Tyrol become a part of Austria again instead of remaining Italian lived in Terfens. The municipal council of Terfens campaigned for the pardon of Karola Unterkirchers after she was arrested.
