= Solid Air Diamant Twin =

German ultralight trike

Diamant Twin
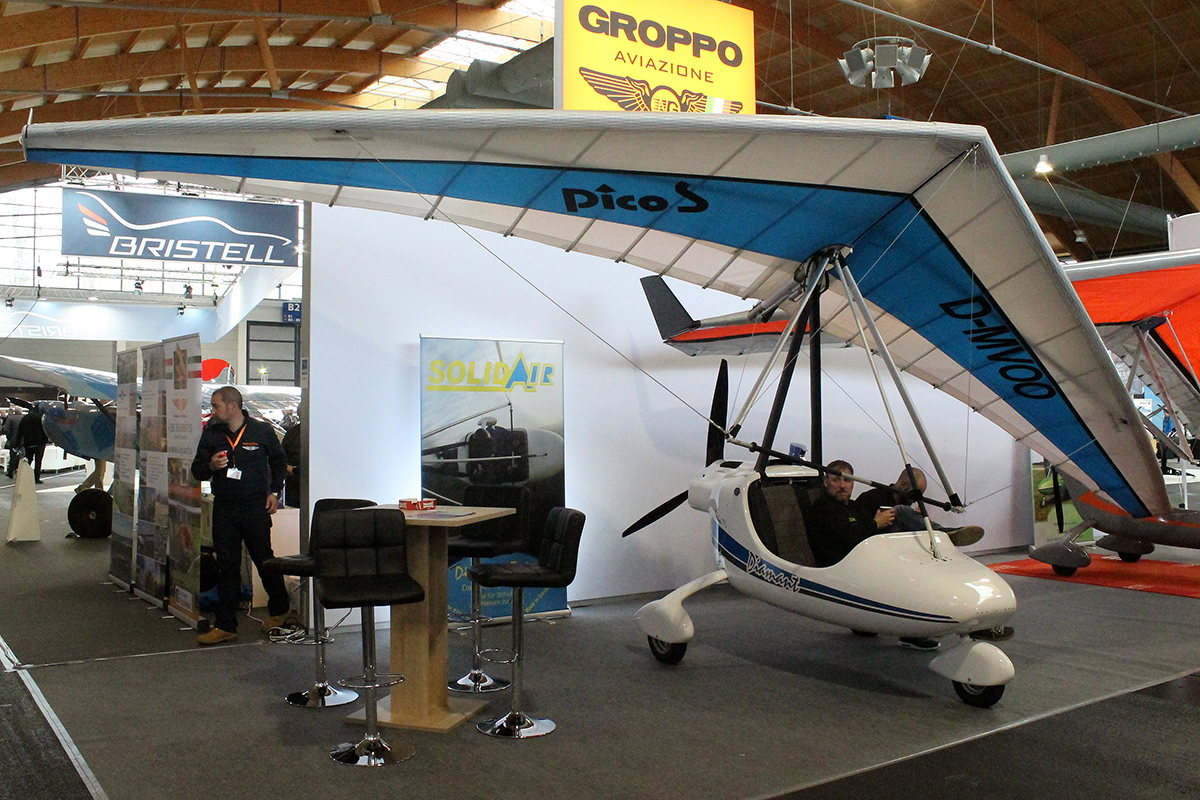

General information
- Type: Ultralight trike
- National origin: Germany
- Manufacturer: Solid Air UL-Bau Franz
- Status: In production (2013)

The Solid Air Diamant Twin (English: Diamond) is a German ultralight trike, designed and produced by Solid Air UL-Bau Franz of Hundheim, Rheinland-Pfalz. The aircraft is supplied as a complete ready-to-fly-aircraft.

== Design and development ==
The Diamant Twin was designed to comply with the Fédération Aéronautique Internationale microlight category, including the category's maximum gross weight of 450 kg (992 lb) and, in fact, the aircraft has a maximum gross weight of 450 kg (992 lb). It features a cable-braced hang glider-style high-wing, weight-shift controls, a two-seats-in-side-by-side configuration open cockpit with a cockpit fairing, tricycle landing gear with wheel pants and a single engine in pusher configuration.

The aircraft fuselage is made from fibreglass, with its double surface aluminum-framed wing covered in Dacron sailcloth. Unusually the engine firewall is made from fibreglass-laminated plywood. Its 10.1 m (33.1 ft) span standard Bautek Pico wing is supported by a single tube-type kingpost and uses an "A" frame weight-shift control bar. The landing gear features fibreglass suspension. The powerplant is a horizontally opposed, four-cylinder, air-cooled, two-stroke, dual-ignition 83 hp (62 kW) Hirth F-30 engine or, optionally a BMW four stroke powerplant.

The aircraft has an empty weight of 190 kg (419 lb) and a gross weight of 450 kg (992 lb), giving a useful load of 260 kg (573 lb). With full fuel of 40 litres (8.8 imp gal; 11 US gal) the payload is 231 kg (509 lb).

A number of different wings can be fitted to the basic carriage, including the Bautek Pico and the La Mouette Ghost 12 and 14.

== Specifications (Diamant Twin with Bautek Pico wing) ==
Data from Bayerl

General characteristics

- Crew: one
- Capacity: one passenger
- Wingspan: 10.1 m (33 ft 2 in)
- Wing area: 14.8 m^{2} (159 sq ft)
- Empty weight: 190 kg (419 lb)
- Gross weight: 450 kg (992 lb)
- Fuel capacity: 40 litres (8.8 imp gal; 11 US gal)
- Powerplant: 1 × Hirth F-30 horizontally opposed, four-cylinder, air-cooled, two-stroke, dual-ignition aircraft engine, 62 kW (83 hp)
- Propellers: 3-bladed composite

Performance

- Maximum speed: 150 km/h (93 mph, 81 kn)
- Cruise speed: 92 km/h (57 mph, 50 kn)
- Stall speed: 60 km/h (37 mph, 32 kn)
- Rate of climb: 4.5 m/s (890 ft/min)
- Wing loading: 30.4 kg/m^{2} (6.2 lb/sq ft)
