= Beuren, Esslingen =

Beuren
- Municipality
- Coat of arms

- Location of Beuren within Esslingen district
- Interactive map of Beuren
- Location within Germany Location within Baden-Württemberg
- Coordinates: 48°34′9″N 9°24′10″E
- Country: Germany
- State: Baden-Württemberg
- Admin. region: Stuttgart
- District: Esslingen
- Subdivisions: 2

Government
  - Mayor (2023–31): Daniel Gluiber

Area
  - Total: 11.69 km^{2} (4.51 sq mi)
- Elevation: 435 m (1,427 ft)

Population (2025-12-31)
  - Total: 3,552
  - Density: 303.8/km^{2} (787.0/sq mi)
- Time zone: UTC+01:00 (CET)
  - Summer (DST): UTC+02:00 (CEST)
- Postal codes: 72660
- Dialling codes: 07025, 07022 (Sonnenhof)
- Vehicle registration: ES
- Website: www.beuren.de

Beuren (German pronunciation: [ˈbɔʏʁən]) is a municipality in the district of Esslingen in Baden-Württemberg in southern Germany. It is a spa and resort. With the majority of its district (95.2%), Beuren is part of the Swabian Alb Biosphere Reserve.

== Geography ==
Beuren is located 28 km southeast of Stuttgart and 16 km southwest of Reutlingen.

== Politics ==
=== Mayors since 1853 ===
- 1853–1879: Nicolaus Klaß
- 1879–1888: Jacob Klaß
- 1888–1890: Philipp Friedrich Nestel
- 1890–1927: Wilhelm Eugen Schraft
- 1927–1934: Karl Friedrich Schminke
- 1934: Wilhelm König
- 1934–1945: Wilhelm Spanagel
- 1945–1946: August Reuß
- 1946–1948: Helmut Link
- 1948–1983: Willi Gras
- 1983–2015: Erich Hartmann
- since 2016: Daniel Gluiber

=== Municipal council ===
The result of the local government elections on 25 May 2014:

CDU	46,2%	+2,1	6 seats	±0
Freie Wähler	53,8%	+15,7	8 seats	+2

== Notable people ==
- August Pfänder (1891–1971), mayor in Neuffen and Nürtingen
- Gottlob Espenlaub (1900–1972), born in Balzholz, German pilot and plane-constructor
- Karl Albert Pfänder (1906–1990), wooden sculptor and wood turner, designer for wood products
- Wolfgang Ischinger (born 1946), German jurist, former diplomat, leader of Munich Security Conference since 2008
