= Solid Air Diamant LP =

German ultrlight trike

Diamant LP
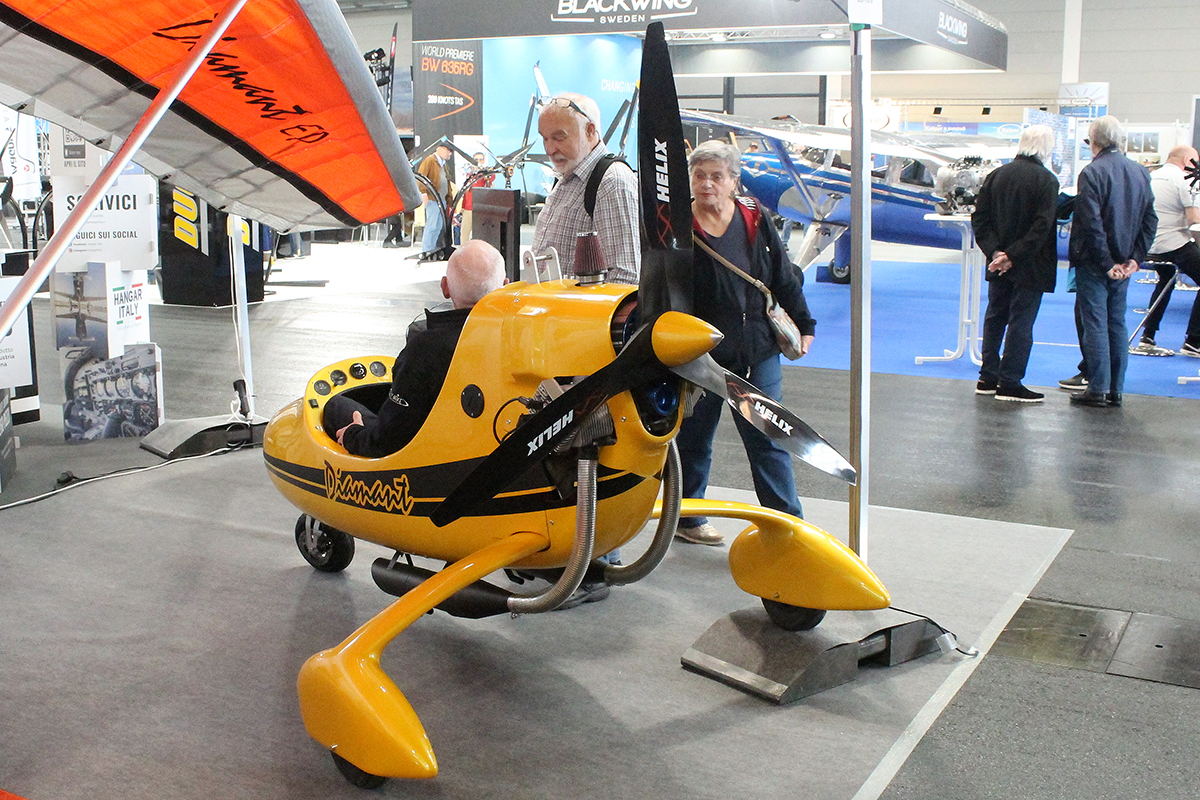

General information
- Type: Ultralight trike
- National origin: Germany
- Manufacturer: Solid Air UL-Bau Franz
- Status: In production (2013)

The Solid Air Diamant LP (English: Diamond, Light Performance) is a German ultralight trike, designed and produced by Solid Air UL-Bau Franz of Hundheim, Rheinland-Pfalz. The aircraft is supplied as a complete ready-to-fly-aircraft.

== Design and development ==
The Diamant LP was designed to comply with the German 120 kg (265 lb) microlight category. The aircraft has a standard empty weight of 118 kg (260 lb). It features a cable-braced hang glider-style high-wing, weight-shift controls, a single-seat open cockpit with a cockpit fairing, tricycle landing gear with wheel pants and a single engine in pusher configuration.

The aircraft fuselage is made from composites, with its double surface aluminum-framed wing covered in Dacron sailcloth. Its 9.7 m (31.8 ft) span Bautek Pico L wing is supported by a single tube-type kingpost and uses an "A" frame weight-shift control bar. The wing has a two-point mounting system which allows the nose of the aircraft to be raised when flaring for landing. The pilot's seat is adjustable for both leg length and back angle. The landing gear features both disc brakes and fibreglass suspension. The powerplant is a twin cylinder, air-cooled, two-stroke, dual-ignition 50 hp (37 kW) Hirth F-23 engine.

The aircraft has an empty weight of 118 kg (260 lb) and a gross weight of 238 kg (525 lb), giving a useful load of 120 kg (265 lb).

== Specifications (Diamant LP with Bautek Pico L wing) ==
Data from Bayerl

General characteristics

- Crew: one
- Wingspan: 9.7 m (31 ft 10 in)
- Wing area: 12.2 m^{2} (131 sq ft)
- Empty weight: 118 kg (260 lb)
- Gross weight: 238 kg (525 lb)
- Powerplant: 1 × Hirth F-23 twin cylinder, air-cooled, two stroke aircraft engine, 37 kW (50 hp)
- Propellers: 3-bladed composite

Performance

- Maximum speed: 130 km/h (81 mph, 70 kn)
- Cruise speed: 100 km/h (62 mph, 54 kn)
- Stall speed: 45 km/h (28 mph, 24 kn)
- Rate of climb: 4.5 m/s (890 ft/min)
- Wing loading: 19.5 kg/m^{2} (4.0 lb/sq ft)
