= Weißlahnsee =

Lake in Terfens, Tyrol, Austria

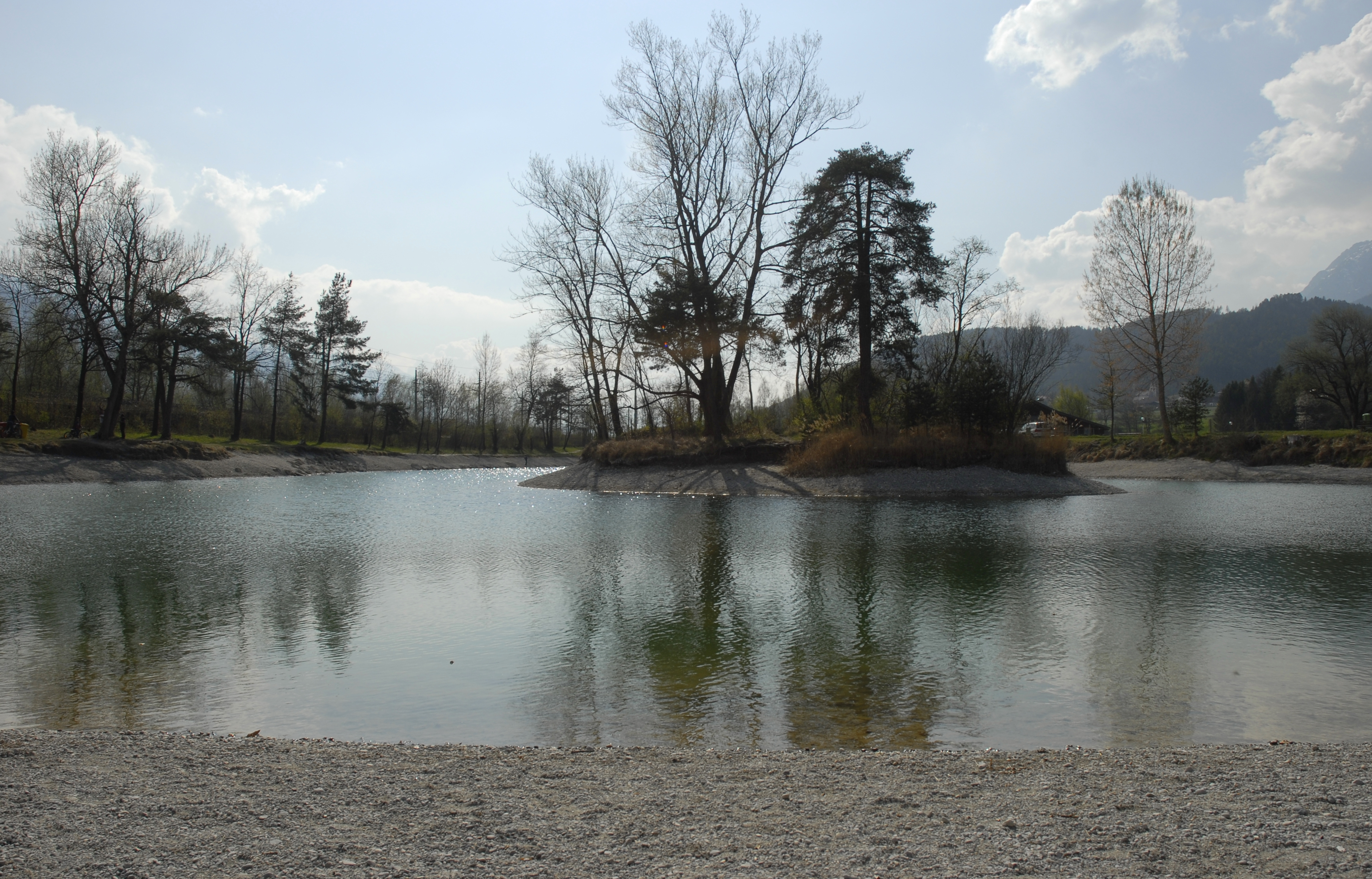
- Weißlahn from the eastern shore

- Location within Tyrol, Austria
- Location: Terfens, Tyrol, Austria
- Coordinates: 47.3220°N 11.6564°E

Weißlahnsee or Badesee Weißlahn is a lake of Terfens, Tyrol, Austria. It is an artificial bathing lake fed and drained by a small stream which is a minor tributary of the River Inn.
