= Sokopf =

Austrian aircraft manufacturer

- Company type: Privately held company
- Industry: Aerospace
- Founded: 1990s
- Founder: Uli Sokopf
- Defunct: late 2000s
- Headquarters: Innsbruck, Austria
- Products: Paramotors

Sokopf was an Austrian aircraft manufacturer based in Innsbruck and founded by Uli Sokopf. The company specialized in the design and manufacture of paramotors in the form of ready-to-fly aircraft for the US FAR 103 Ultralight Vehicles rules and the European Fédération Aéronautique Internationale microlight category.

The company seems to have been founded before 1998 and gone out of business after 2004.

The company's line of paramotors, the Sokopf Falke, is noted for its emphasis on high power, rather than low empty weight, unlike many other paramotor manufacturers. In an emergency the entire engine unit can be jettisoned.

== Aircraft ==
Summary of aircraft built by Sokopf
Model name	First flight	Number built	Type
Sokopf Falke	1998		paramotor
