= Solid Air UL-Bau Franz =

German aircraft manufacturer

Solid Air UL-Bau Franz GmbH
- Company type: Privately held company
- Industry: Aerospace
- Headquarters: Hundheim, Rheinland-Pfalz, Germany
- Products: Ultralight trikes
- Website: www.diamantenwerft.de

Solid Air UL-Bau Franz is a German aircraft manufacturer based in Hundheim, Rheinland-Pfalz. The company specializes in the design and manufacture of ultralight trikes.

The company has been noted for its innovative designs and use of materials to improve maintainability. The Solid Air Diamant Twin has an unusual side-by-side configuration cockpit and a plywood engine mount laminated to a fibreglass structure to create a firewall. The Solid Air Diamant LP incorporates a two-point wing mounting that allows the carriage to be flared like a conventional airplane on landing.

== Aircraft ==
Summary of aircraft built by Solid Air UL-Bau Franz
Model name	First flight	Number built	Type
Solid Air Diamant LP			single seat ultralight trike
Solid Air Diamant Twin			two seats in side-by-side configuration ultralight trike
