= Solar MS-1 =

MS-1
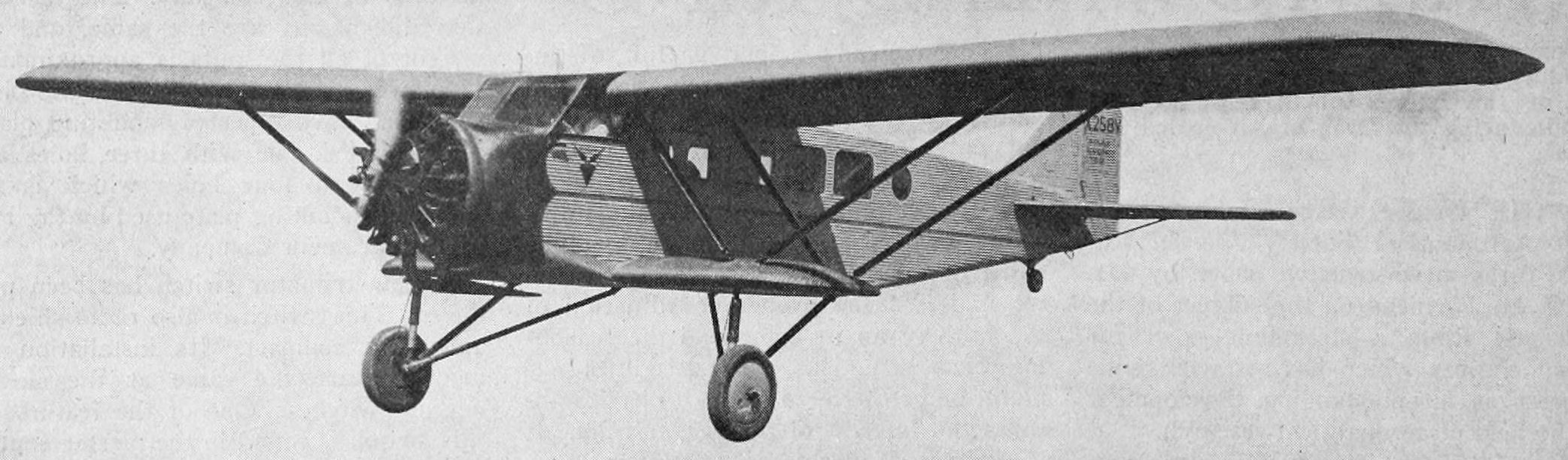

General information
- Type: Airliner
- National origin: United States
- Manufacturer: Solar Aircraft Company
- Designer: William L. Lewis
- Status: abandoned
- Number built: 1

History
- First flight: 21 January 1930
- Developed from: Prudden SE-1

The Solar MS-1 was an American prototype all-metal sesquiplane airliner built in 1930.

== Design and development ==
Its wings were braced to each other with warren truss-style struts. The lower stub wings carried the well separated legs of the fixed undercarriage. The fuselage was of rectangular cross-section and featured a fully enclosed flight deck and passenger cabin. The tail was of conventional design with strut-braced stabilizers and carrying a fixed tailwheel. Construction was of metal throughout with corrugated skins, and was powered by a single 420 hp (310 kW) Pratt & Whitney Wasp radial engine in the nose.

== Operational service ==
The MS-1 flew for the first time registered as X258V on 21 January 1930 with Doug Kelly at the controls. Kelly described it as "one of the finest closed planes I have ever flown", and Charles Lindbergh also praised the MS-1 when he flew it a few days later. Despite this, the airlines did not order the type, although Northwest Airways and ten other airlines considered, and rejected buying examples due to the effect that the onset of the Great Depression was having on their traffic volumes. A 6,000 miles (9,700 km) record flight from Los Angeles, California to Tokyo was planned, but never happened. The high point was a 7,000 miles (11,000 km) transcontinental flight over 25 states that the president of Solar took with his entire family, including his wife and three children, aged 9, 7 and 3, which attracted considerable interest from the media who dubbed it the "flying nursery". A purchasing agent for a major airline then promised a substantial order, but dropped dead of a heart attack the day the order was to be signed, and his replacement called off the deal. Solar made the prototype available for charter flights for a while, but in 1931 sold it to an operator in Mexico who used it to transport coffee beans. On the Mexican register as XB-AFK, the MS-1 was destroyed in a crash in 1936. Solar would never build another aircraft, turning to saucepans to survive the depression, and later stainless steel exhaust shrouds.

== Specifications (Solar MS-1) ==
Data from Jane's all the World's Aircraft 1931, U.S. Commercial Aircraft Aero Digest - Solar all-metal sesquiplane

General characteristics

- Crew: Two
- Capacity: Eight passengers
- Length: 35 ft 11 in (10.95 m)
- Upper wingspan: 56 ft 6 in (17.22 m)
- Upper wing chord: 100 in (2.54 m)
- Upper wing dihedral: 2°
- Lower wingspan: 18 ft 0 in (5.49 m)
- Lower wing chord: 70 in (1.78 m)
- Lower wing dihedral: 0°
- Height: 10 ft 2 in (3.10 m)
- Undercarriage track: 9 ft 6 in (2.90 m)
- Wing area: 496.5 sq ft (46.13 m^{2})
- Airfoil: Göttingen 398
- Empty weight: 3,650 lb (1,656 kg)
- Gross weight: 7,000 lb (3,175 kg)
- Fuel capacity: 135 US gal (112 imp gal; 510 L)
- Oil Capacity: 8 US gal (30 L; 6.7 imp gal)
- Powerplant: 1 × Pratt & Whitney R-1340 Wasp 9-cylinder air-cooled radial piston engine, 420 hp (310 kW)
- Propellers: 2-bladed fixed pitch metal propeller

Performance

- Maximum speed: 130 mph (210 km/h, 110 kn)
- Cruise speed: 115 mph (185 km/h, 100 kn)
- Landing speed: 60 mph (52 kn; 97 km/h)
- Service ceiling: 15,000 ft (4,600 m)
- Absolute ceiling: 18,400 ft (5,600 m)
- Rate of climb: 750 ft/min (3.8 m/s) initial
- Wing loading: 14 lb/sq ft (68 kg/m^{2})
- Power/mass: 16.4 lb/hp (10.0 kg/kW)

== See also ==
Aircraft of comparable role, configuration, and era

- Bellanca CH-300 Pacemaker
- Buhl Airsedan
- Cunningham-Hall PT-6
- Stearman CAB-1 Coach

Related lists

- List of civil aircraft
