= Sopwith Admiralty Type 137 =

Admiralty Type 137

General information
- Type: Torpedo bomber
- National origin: United Kingdom
- Manufacturer: Sopwith Aviation, Kingston-upon-Hull
- Primary user: Royal Navy Air Service
- Number built: 2

History
- First flight: August 1914

The Sopwith Admiralty Types 137 and 138 were a pair of single-engine, two-seat naval biplane floatplanes, built to a British Admiralty order in 1914. They were similar in design, but having a more powerful engine the Type 138 was the larger and heavier. They were used in early torpedo dropping experiments in 1914.

== Design and development ==
The Admiralty Types 137 and 138 were built by Sopwiths to a contract calling for two similarly laid out floatplanes powered by different makes of engine of markedly different powers. This requirement lead to the two aircraft having significantly different dimensions and weights. They were built in parallel and handed over to the Admiralty within a few days of each other in August 1914.

They were both biplanes, with round tipped constant chord wings connected by pairs of parallel interplane struts. The Type 137 was a standard two bay biplane but the 8 ft (2.4 m) larger span Type 138 had an additional small inner bay. There was some stagger, though less on the Type 138. The upper wing had the greater span, overhanging by 6 ft (1.8 m) on the Type 137 and by 4 ft (1.2 m) on the Type 138. This overhang was braced with an extra pair of interplane struts, leaning outwards and attached to the lower wing at the same points as the outer vertical interplane struts. There were externally interconnected ailerons on both upper and lower wings. The lower wings were attached to the bottom fuselage and the upper ones supported well above the cockpits by cabane struts.

The fuselage was a flat sided, wooden, cross braced girder structure. This carried a conventional fin and rudder, plus a rectangular tailplane, mounted on top of the fuselage, with split elevators. There were two cockpits in tandem, with the pilot seated aft. Both types had long, flat sided floats with curved upper and lower surfaces, the latter with a single step. These were attached to the fuselage with a fore and aft pair of inverted W-form struts, the latter leaf sprung. A similar, though smaller and unstepped third float was mounted on long struts beneath the tail, fitted with a water rudder.

The principal difference between the two types was the engine. The smaller Type 137 was designed for, and initially flown with, a 120 hp (90 kW) six-cylinder inline water-cooled Austro-Daimler, while the Type 138 had a 200 hp (150 kW) Salmson 2M7 14-cylinder water-cooled radial. Engine choice determined the shape of the nose: the inline engine had a rectangular radiator mounted in front of it, projecting slightly above the upper fuselage line, whereas the radial was uncowled, with a pair of vertical radiators mounted in the small inner bays of the Type 138.

== Operational history ==
Both aircraft operated in the Solent area from August 1914 until they were withdrawn from use in January 1916. The Type 138 was used in successful torpedo dropping trials in August and September 1914. The Type 137 was badly damaged in September 1914 and was later fitted with the same type of engine as in the Type 138.

== Specifications (Type 138) ==
Data from British Aircraft Before the Great War

General characteristics

- Crew: two
- Length: 34 ft 10 in (10.62 m)
- Upper wingspan: 56 ft 0 in (17.07 m)
- Lower wingspan: 48 ft 0 in (14.63 m)
- Height: 12 ft 8 in (3.86 m)
- Wing area: 658 sq ft (61.1 m^{2})
- Empty weight: 2,190 lb (993 kg)
- Gross weight: 3,450 lb (1,565 kg)
- Powerplant: 1 × Salmson 2M7 (Canton-Unné) 14-cylinder, 2-row, water-cooled radial, 200 hp (150 kW)
- Propellers: 2, later 4-bladed Lang
