= Soaring Concepts =

American aircraft manufacturer

Soaring Concepts, Inc.
- Company type: Privately held company
- Industry: Aerospace
- Founded: 2000
- Headquarters: Sturgis, Michigan, United States
- Key people: Galen Geigley, President
- Products: Powered parachutes
- Website: soaringconceptsaerospace.com

Soaring Concepts, Inc., called Soaring Concepts Aerospace since 2015, is an American aircraft manufacturer founded by Galen Geigley and based in Sturgis, Michigan. The company specializes in the design and manufacture of powered parachutes in the form of kits for amateur construction and ready-to-fly aircraft under the US light-sport aircraft rules.

The company was founded in 2000 to produce a single product, the Soaring Concepts Sky Trek, a powered parachute design that is optimized for use as a trainer. It has a higher than normal propeller ground clearance and larger diameter 4130 steel tubing for added strength, as well as other features that make it suitable for training use. The aircraft has been accepted as a light-sport aircraft by the Federal Aviation Administration (FAA). By August 2015 the company had produced at least 25 aircraft that had been registered in the US by the FAA.

== Aircraft ==
Summary of aircraft built by Soaring Concepts
Model name	First flight	Number built	Type
Soaring Concepts Sky Trek	2000	at least 75|align=left| Two seat powered parachute	
