= SNAS Stryke-Air Bi =

French powered parachute

Stryke-Air Bi

General information
- Type: Powered parachute
- National origin: France
- Manufacturer: Société Nouvelle d'Aviation Sportive
- Status: Production completed (2004)

History
- Manufactured: 2001-2004

The SNAS Stryke-Air Bi (English: two-place) is a French powered parachute that was designed and produced by Société Nouvelle d'Aviation Sportive (SNAS) of Noillac. Now out of production, when it was available the aircraft was supplied complete and ready-to-fly.

The aircraft was introduced in about 2001 and production ended when the company went out of business in 2004.

== Design and development ==
The Stryke-Air Bi was designed to comply with the Fédération Aéronautique Internationale microlight category, including the category's maximum gross weight of 450 kg (992 lb). The aircraft has a maximum gross weight of 230 kg (507 lb). It features a parachute-style wing, two-seats-in-tandem accommodation, tricycle landing gear and a single 25 hp (19 kW) Zanzottera MZ 34 engine in pusher configuration. The 40 hp (30 kW) Zanzottera MZ 201 engine was a factory option.

The aircraft carriage is built from 4130 steel tubing. In flight steering is accomplished via handles that actuate the canopy brakes, creating roll and yaw. On the ground the aircraft has foot pedal-controlled nosewheel steering. The main landing gear incorporates spring rod suspension. There is a fixed vertical fin to reduce propeller torque effects. Unusually the pilot sits in the back and the passenger is accommodated in the front seat.

== Specifications (Stryke-Air Bi) ==
Data from Bertrand and manufacturer

General characteristics

- Crew: one
- Capacity: one passenger
- Empty weight: 43 kg (95 lb) carriage weight only, less canopy and engine
- Gross weight: 230 kg (507 lb)
- Fuel capacity: 20 litres (4.4 imp gal; 5.3 US gal)
- Powerplant: 1 × Zanzottera MZ 34 single cylinder, two-stroke, air-cooled aircraft engine, 19 kW (25 hp)
- Propellers: 2-bladed fixed pitch, 1.31 m (4 ft 4 in) diameter

Performance

- Endurance: 6 hours
