= Gottlob Espenlaub =

German inventor

- Espenlaub c. 1929
- Born: October 25, 1900; Bauzholz, Esslingen, Germany (now Beuren)
- Died: January 9, 1972 (aged 71)
- Known for: early glider design and construction in Germany

Gottlob Espenlaub (25 October 1900 – 9 January 1972), nicknamed Espe, was an inventor who specialized in early types of aircraft, specifically gliders and rocket propulsion systems designed for them. He invented a number of different aircraft, focusing on tailless designs. Espenlaub co-founded the practice of aerotowing.

== Aeronautic career ==
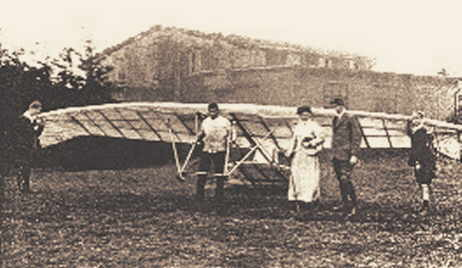
Gottlob Espenlaub

Espenlaub was born in Balzholz, since 1938 part of Beuren. As a young man Espenlaub served as a joiner to aircraft builders. He helped Alexander Lippisch to build a style of glider in 1921 according to Lippisch's designs. The glider was subsequently dubbed the Lippisch-Espenlaub E-2 glider, due to Espenlaub's participation in its creation. Espenlaub began building his own rocket propelled gliders in 1928, conducting his first rocket test on October 22, 1929. His rocket glider for this test was dubbed the RAK-3 and it featured missiles attached to the wings. During the flight, these missiles caught the tail on fire, forcing an early landing. Due to this, many of Espenlaub's later designs would feature tailless gliders.

After conducting further tests, he improved his design and then did another test with his glider in Düsseldorf, Germany in 1930, achieving a speed of 90 kilometers per hour. He had already been known as a "renowned German sailplane pilot" before, because of his various designs and his piloting abilities. Therefore, he was asked to test fly numerous new kinds of aircraft, such as the A2 airplane in 1929 built by Alexander Soldenhoff.

Espenlaub also served as a theorist and implementor in terms of aircraft design and the future abilities of aircraft. He and Gerhard Fieseler conducted a number of demonstrations in 1927 at Kassel on the idea of aerotowing and its feasibility in the air. It was the first time this idea was shown, and it became widely used after Espenlaub's and Fieseler's demonstrations.

== Automotive designs ==
Both before and after the war, Espenlaub produced innovative streamliner automotive designs, but none were commercially successful.
