= Soyer-Barritault SB1 =

1980s French aircraft

SB1
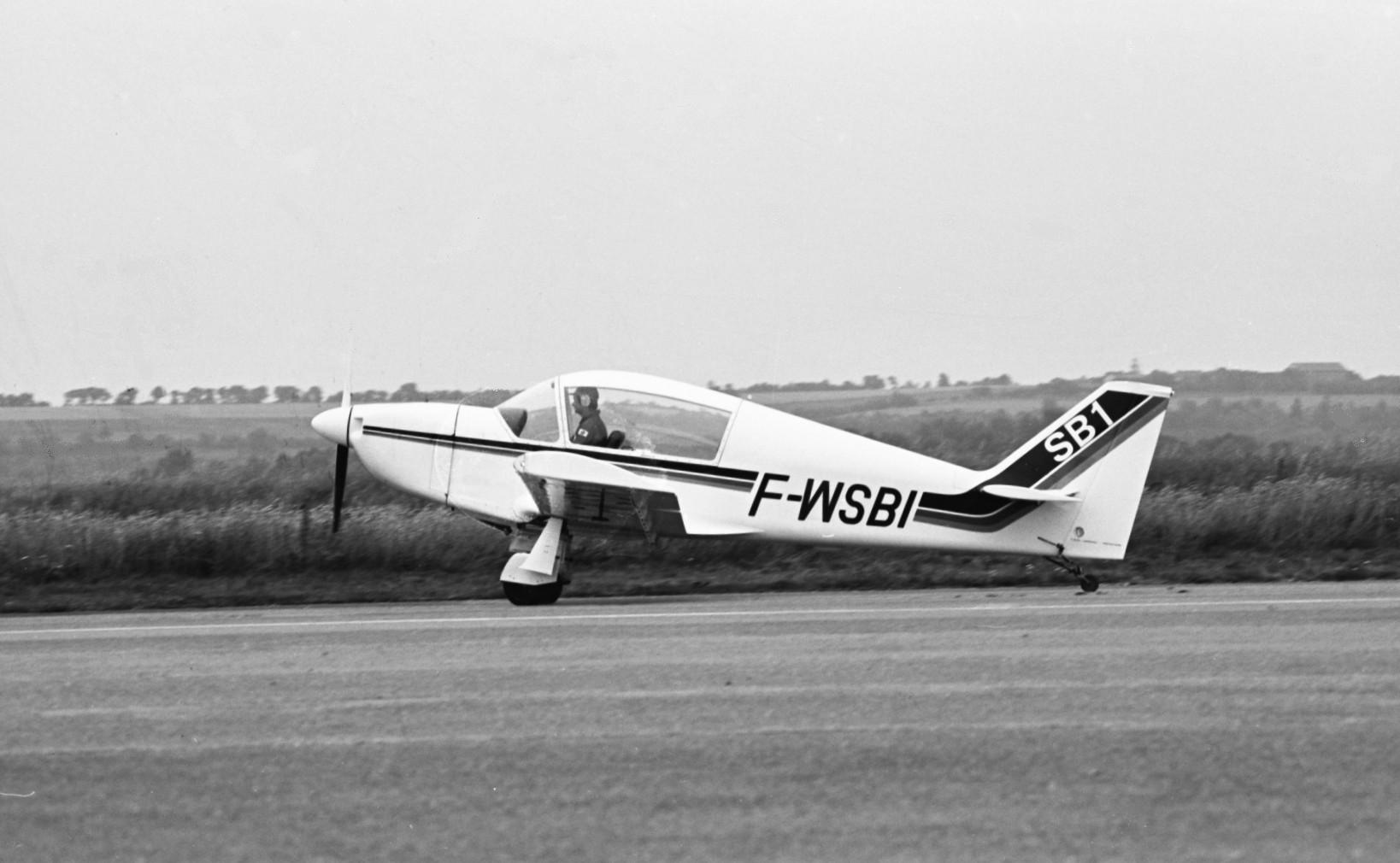

General information
- Type: Tourism aircraft
- National origin: France
- Manufacturer: Claude Soyer and Jean Barritault
- Number built: 1

History
- First flight: 24 May 1984

The Soyer-Barritault SB1 was a home-built 2-seat tourism aircraft built in France in the early 1980s.

== Specifications ==
Data from

General characteristics

- Crew: 2
- Length: 7.20 m (23 ft 7 in)
- Wingspan: 9.88 m (32 ft 5 in)
- Height: 1.90 m (6 ft 3 in)
- Wing area: 12.20 m^{2} (131.3 sq ft)
- Empty weight: 642 kg (1,415 lb)
- Gross weight: 1,012 kg (2,231 lb)
- Powerplant: 1 × Lycoming O-320-D2A 4-cylinder air-cooled horizontally-opposed piston engine, 120 kW (160 hp)

Performance

- Maximum speed: 330 km/h (210 mph, 180 kn)
- Range: 2,250 km (1,400 mi, 1,210 nmi)
