= Alexander Soldenhoff =

Swiss artist and aircraft designer

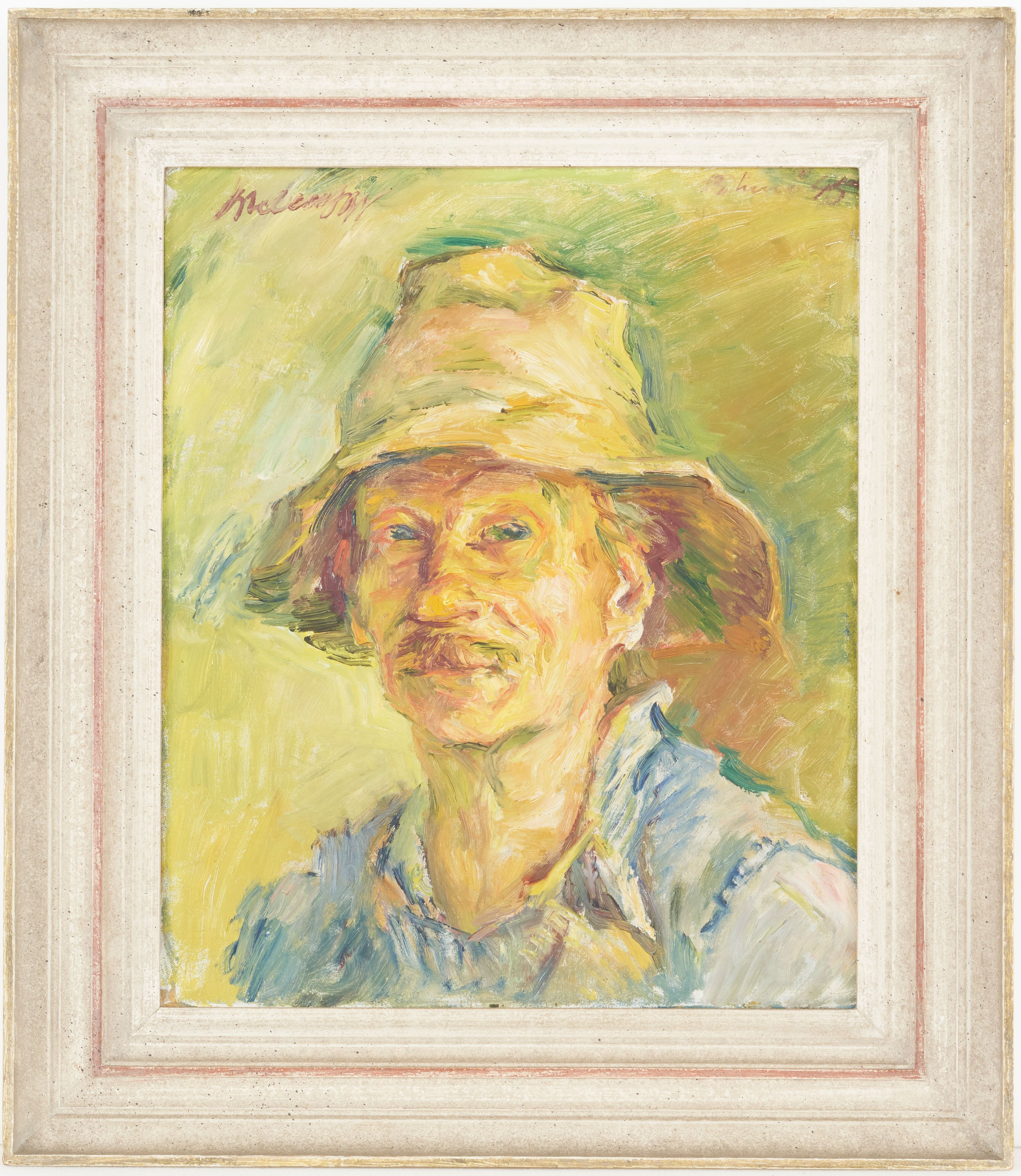
Alexander Soldenhoff: self portrait (1945)

Alexander Leo Soldenhoff (1882–1951) was a Swiss artist and aircraft designer. Born in Switzerland, he lived much of his life in Germany.

In 1906 he married Anna Zweifler from Glarus. They separated in 1947, only a few years before his death.

== Painting ==
Soldenhoff trained as an artist and during the early 1900s was employed as an art teacher. His aeronautical work interrupted his career as a painter, but he would return to it from time to time when he ran out of money to build more aeroplanes.

== Aircraft ==
SL 1, now on display as the Soldenhoff S-5 in the Swiss Museum of Transport, Lucerne.

Soldenhoff became interested in aviation during the pioneer years of the twentieth century. After the end of WWI he determined to develop a tailless, swept-wing "safety aeroplane" after the manner of designs already produced from 1909.

He built his first full-size glider and began attempts to fly in 1915. He completed the Bülbül I in July 1928 and entered it in that year's Rhön competition but it was blown backwards and damaged before he could launch it.

His subsequent aircraft would all be tailless swept-wing, single-engined types with a short fuselage and pusher propeller, although he envisaged some much larger and more complex designs. The examples which flew included:

- V 1, later redesignated So A/1. 1927.
- LF 5 "Berliner", later redesignated So A/2. 1929. Flown by Gottlob Espenlaub (the design is sometimes also mistakenly attributed to him).
- So A/3 "Düsseldorfer". 1930. Soldenhoff's most successful design.
- So A/4 "Böblingerin". 1931.
- So A/5, a second "Böblingerin". 1931.
- SL 1. 1936. Flew briefly. Now on display as the S-5 in the Swiss Museum of Transport, Lucerne.
