= Solo Wings =

South African aircraft manufacturer

Solo Wings CC
- Company type: Privately held company
- Industry: Aerospace
- Founded: mid-1980s
- Defunct: circa 2012
- Headquarters: Gillitts, KwaZulu-Natal, South Africa
- Products: Ultralight trikes
- Website: www.solowings.co.za

Solo Wings CC was a South African aircraft manufacturer based in Gillitts, KwaZulu-Natal. The company specialized in the design and manufacture of ultralight trikes in the form of ready-to-fly aircraft for the European Fédération Aéronautique Internationale microlight category.

The company seems to have gone out of business circa 2012 and production of its Solo Wings Aquilla design taken over by Microcrafts Africa.

The company produced two ultralight trike designs, starting with the entry-level Windlass, powered by the Rotax 503 50 hp (37 kW) twin cylinder, two-stroke, air-cooled aircraft engine in about 1987. More than 600 of this model had been delivered by 2001. In the 1990s the more sophisticated Aquilla was introduced.

== Bateleur Sky Sports ==
Both Solo Wings models were sold in the United States by a Solo Wings distributor, Bateleur Sky Sports, Inc. of Palm Coast, Florida and later Fort Lauderdale, Florida from the late 1990s until the early 2000s under their own name as the Bateleur Windlass and Bateleur Aquilla. Bateleur Sky Sports appears to have gone out of business in about 2004.

== Aircraft ==
Summary of aircraft built by
Model name	First flight	Number built	Type
Solo Wings Windlass	circa 1987	more than 600 (by 2001)	two-seat ultralight trike
Solo Wings Aquilla	1990s	40 (by 2000)	two-seat ultralight trike
