= Vomp =

- Municipality
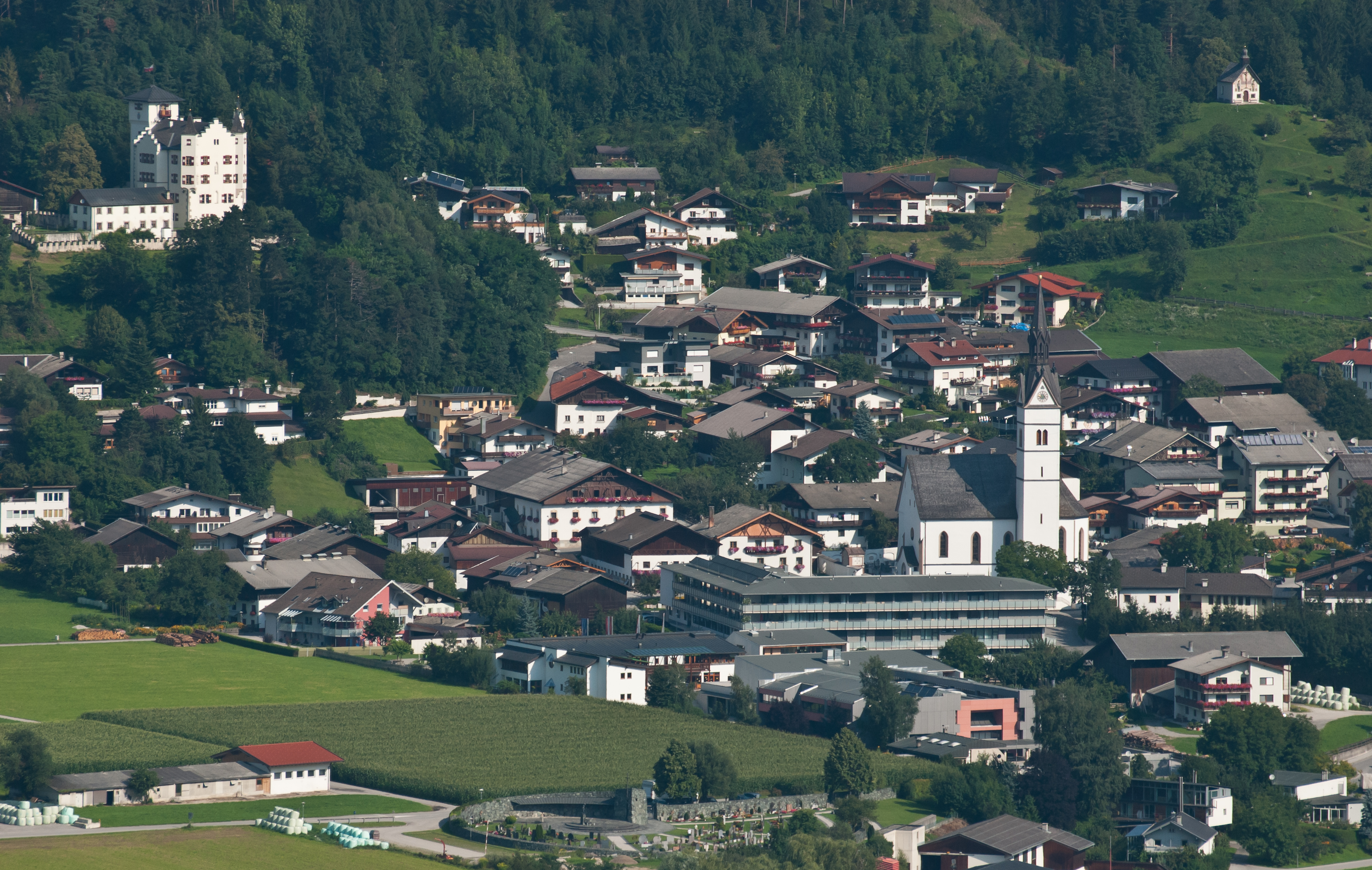
- Vomp seen from the south

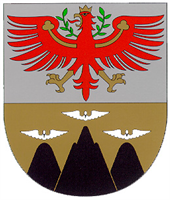
- Coat of arms

- Location within Austria
- Coordinates: 47°20′32″N 11°41′00″E
- Country: Austria
- State: Tyrol
- District: Schwaz

Government
  - Mayor: Karl-Josef Schubert (ÖVP)

Area
  - Total: 182.78 km^{2} (70.57 sq mi)
- Elevation: 566 m (1,857 ft)

Population (2021)
  - Total: 5,283
  - Density: 28.90/km^{2} (74.86/sq mi)
- Time zone: UTC+1 (CET)
  - Summer (DST): UTC+2 (CEST)
- Postal code: 6134
- Area code: 05242
- Vehicle registration: SZ
- Website: www.vomp.tirol.gv.at

Vomp is a municipality in the Schwaz district in the Austrian state of Tyrol.

== Population ==
Historical population
Year	Pop.	±%
1869	886	—
1880	1,045	+17.9%
1890	1,125	+7.7%
1900	1,181	+5.0%
1910	1,273	+7.8%
1923	1,244	−2.3%
1934	1,514	+21.7%
1939	2,095	+38.4%
1951	1,808	−13.7%
1961	2,363	+30.7%
1971	3,172	+34.2%
1981	3,424	+7.9%
1991	3,772	+10.2%
2001	4,372	+15.9%
2011	4,638	+6.1%
2021	5,283	+13.9%

== See also ==
- St. Georgenberg-Fiecht Abbey
