= Société Nouvelle d'Aviation Sportive =

French aircraft manufacturer

- Company type: Privately held company
- Industry: Aerospace
- Founded: 2001
- Defunct: 2004
- Fate: Out of business
- Headquarters: Noillac, France
- Products: Powered parachutes
- Services: Ultralight aircraft maintenance, flight training

Société Nouvelle d'Aviation Sportive (SNAS) (English: New Society of Sport Aviation) was a French aircraft manufacturer and flight school based in Noillac. The company specialized in the design and manufacture of powered parachutes in the form of ready-to-fly aircraft for the European Fédération Aéronautique Internationale microlight category.

SNAS produced a line of powered parachutes under the Stryke-Air brand. These included the Stryke-Air Bi and the Stryke-Air Monoplace. Their aircraft designs were noted for their fixed fin to reduce propeller torque effects and also for seating the pilot behind the passenger on their two-place aircraft.

In addition to aircraft manufacturing, the company also conducted ultralight aircraft flight training for both three axis control and powered parachute aircraft types and operated an ultralight aircraft maintenance facility.

The company seems to have been founded in 2001 and gone out of business in 2004.

== Aircraft ==
Summary of aircraft built by SNAS
| Model name | First flight | Number built | Type |
|---|---|---|---|
| Stryke-Air Bi | 2001 | | Two seat powered parachute |
| Stryke-Air Monoplace | 2001 | | Single seat powered parachute |
