= Solo Wings Windlass =

South African ultralight trike aircraft

Windlass

General information
- Type: Ultralight trike
- National origin: South Africa
- Manufacturer: Solo Wings; Bateleur Sky Sports
- Status: Production completed
- Number built: over 600 (by 2001)

History
- Introduction date: circa 1987
- Variant: Solo Wings Aquilla

The Solo Wings Windlass is a South African ultralight trike designed and produced by Solo Wings of Gillitts, KwaZulu-Natal. The aircraft was also sold in the United States by Bateleur Sky Sports of Palm Coast, Florida in the early 2000s, under their own name.

== Design and development ==
The aircraft was designed to comply with the Fédération Aéronautique Internationale microlight category, including the category's maximum gross weight of 450 kg (992 lb). The aircraft has a maximum gross weight of 350 kg (772 lb). It features a cable-braced hang glider-style high-wing, weight-shift controls, a two-seats-in-tandem open cockpit, tricycle landing gear and a single engine in pusher configuration.

The aircraft is made from tubing, with its wing covered in Dacron sailcloth. Its 34 ft (10.4 m) span wing is supported by a single tube-type kingpost and uses an "A" frame control bar. The landing gear includes suspension on all three wheels and a steerable nose wheel. The aircraft has been used for flight training and for this role has dual controls, including dual ground steering. The standard engine supplied is the Rotax 503 50 hp (37 kW) twin cylinder, two-stroke, air-cooled aircraft engine. Wings used include the Aquilla 150 sq ft (14 m^{2}) and 177 sq ft (16.4 m^{2}).

In the early 2000s the company had planned to phase the Windlass out, but customer demand has kept the model in production through 2012.

== Operational history ==
The aircraft placed well in a number of European microlight competitions and was used to set an altitude record of 25,200 ft (7,681.0 m) in 1987.

== Specifications (2000 model Bateleur Windlass) ==
Data from Kitplanes

General characteristics

- Crew: one
- Capacity: one passenger
- Wingspan: 34 ft (10 m)
- Wing area: 165 sq ft (15.3 m^{2})
- Empty weight: 385 lb (175 kg)
- Gross weight: 785 lb (356 kg)
- Fuel capacity: 10 U.S. gallons (38 L; 8.3 imp gal)
- Powerplant: 1 × Rotax 503 twin cylinder, two-stroke, air-cooled aircraft engine, 50 hp (37 kW)

Performance

- Cruise speed: 50 mph (80 km/h, 43 kn)
- Range: 200 mi (320 km, 170 nmi)
- Service ceiling: 18,000 ft (5,500 m)
- Rate of climb: 650 ft/min (3.3 m/s)
