= Solo Wings Aquilla =

South African ultralight trike aircraft

Aquilla

General information
- Type: Ultralight trike
- National origin: South Africa
- Manufacturer: Solo Wings; Bateleur Sky Sports
- Status: In production
- Number built: 40 (by 2000)

History
- Introduction date: 1990s
- Developed from: Solo Wings Windlass

The Solo Wings Aquilla (English: Eagle) is a South African ultralight trike designed and produced by Solo Wings of Gillitts, KwaZulu-Natal. The aircraft was also sold in the United States by Bateleur Sky Sports of Palm Coast, Florida in the early 2000s, under their own name.

== Design and development ==
The Aquilla was derived from the earlier Solo Wings Windlass and designed to comply with the Fédération Aéronautique Internationale microlight category, including the category's maximum gross weight of 450 kg (992 lb). The aircraft has a maximum gross weight of 450 kg (992 lb). It features a cable-braced hang glider-style high-wing, weight-shift controls, a two-seats-in-tandem open cockpit, tricycle landing gear and a single engine in pusher configuration.

The aircraft is made from tubing, with its wing covered in Dacron sailcloth. Its 34 ft (10.4 m) span wing is supported by a single tube-type kingpost and uses an "A" frame control bar. The landing gear includes suspension on all three wheels and a steerable nose wheel. The standard engine supplied is the Rotax 582 64 hp (48 kW) twin cylinder, two-stroke, liquid-cooled aircraft engine. The Rotax 503 50 hp (37 kW) air-cooled two-stroke engine and the four-stroke HKS 700E 60 hp (45 kW) and Rotax 912UL of 80 hp (60 kW) are also available. Wings used include the Aquilla 150 sq ft (14 m^{2}) and 177 sq ft (16.4 m^{2}).

== Specifications (2000 model Bateleur Aquilla) ==
Data from Kitplanes

General characteristics

- Crew: one
- Capacity: one passenger
- Wingspan: 34 ft (10 m)
- Wing area: 150 sq ft (14 m^{2})
- Empty weight: 336 lb (152 kg)
- Gross weight: 776 lb (352 kg)
- Fuel capacity: 10 U.S. gallons (38 L; 8.3 imp gal)
- Powerplant: 1 × Rotax 503 twin cylinder, two-stroke, air-cooled aircraft engine, 50 hp (37 kW)

Performance

- Cruise speed: 62 mph (100 km/h, 54 kn)
- Service ceiling: 18,000 ft (5,500 m)
- Rate of climb: 550 ft/min (2.8 m/s)
