= Softex-Aero V-51 =

Ukrainian helicopter design

V-51
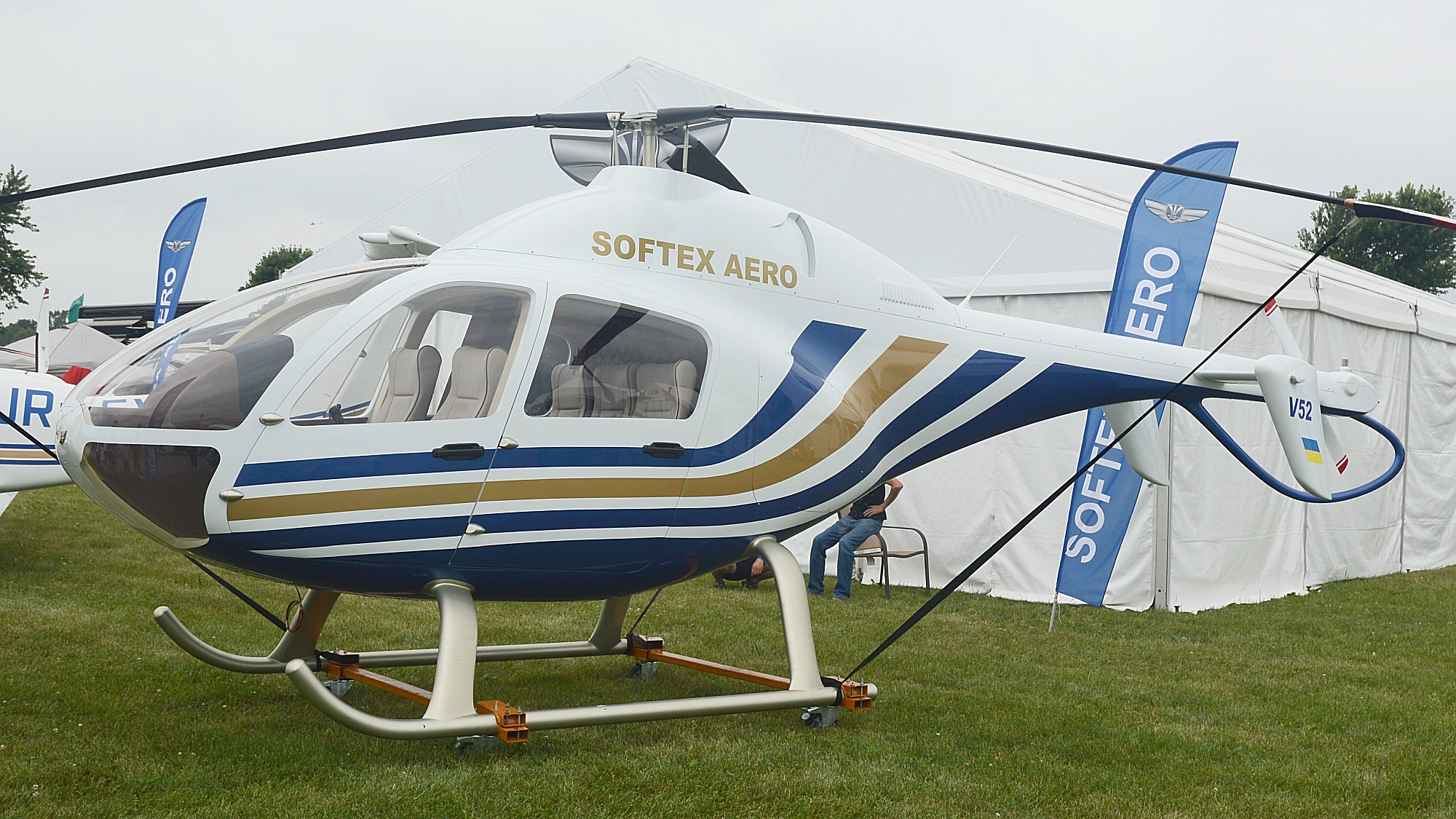

General information
- Type: Helicopter
- National origin: Ukraine
- Manufacturer: Softex-Aero
- Status: In development

The Softex-Aero V-51 is a Ukrainian helicopter design.

== Development ==
The V-51 is a five place turbine powered helicopter with composite rotors. The V-52 is a closely related development.

== Specifications (V-51) ==
Data from AOPA

General characteristics

- Crew: 1 pilot
- Capacity: 4 passenger
- Length: 8.7 m (28 ft 7 in)
- Width: 1.25 m (4 ft 1 in)
- Height: 2.86 m (9 ft 5 in)
- Empty weight: 750 kg (1,653 lb)
- Gross weight: 1,450 kg (3,197 lb)
- Fuel capacity: 385 l
- Powerplant: 1 × Allison 250 C20-B Turboshaft, 280 kW (370 hp)
- Main rotor diameter: × 9.12 m (29 ft 11 in)

Performance

- Maximum speed: 270 km/h (170 mph, 150 kn)
- Never exceed speed: 320 km/h (200 mph, 170 kn)
- Range: 700 km (430 mi, 380 nmi)
- Service ceiling: 5,500 m (18,000 ft)
- g limits: +3.3 -1
