= Külsheim =

- Town
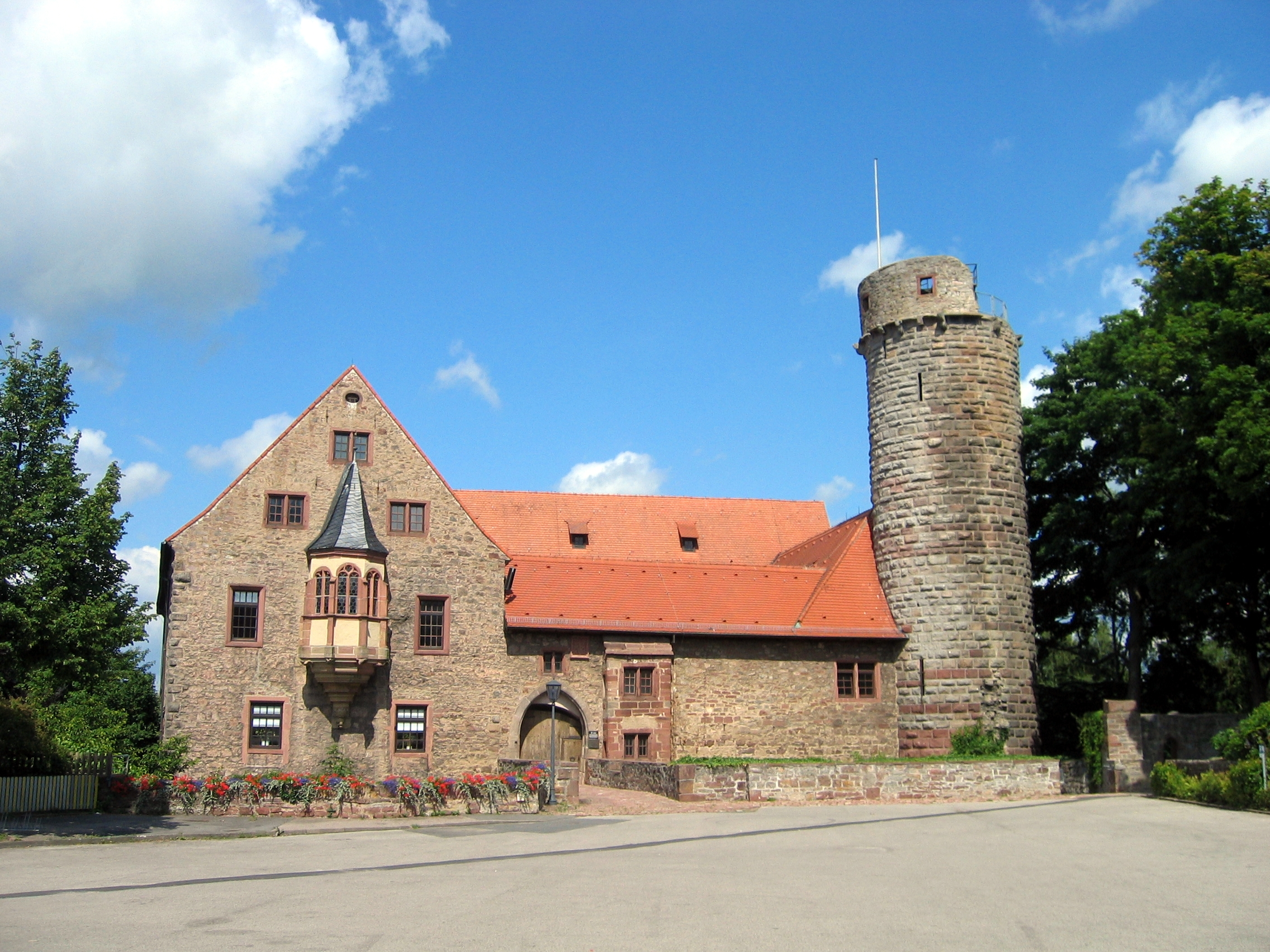
- Külsheim Castle

- Coat of arms

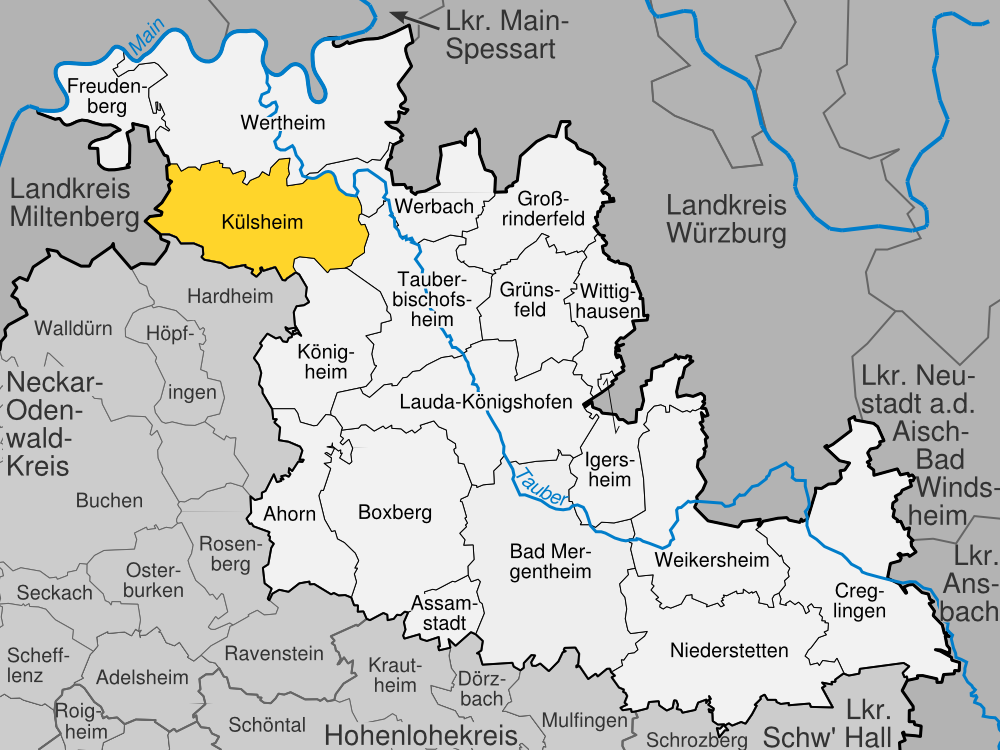
- Location of Külsheim within Main-Tauber-Kreis district
- Interactive map of Külsheim
- Location within Germany Location within Baden-Württemberg
- Coordinates: 49°40′10″N 09°31′14″E
- Country: Germany
- State: Baden-Württemberg
- Admin. region: Stuttgart
- District: Main-Tauber-Kreis

Government
  - Mayor (2019–27): Thomas Schreglmann (CDU)

Area
  - Total: 81.43 km^{2} (31.44 sq mi)
- Elevation: 327 m (1,073 ft)

Population (2025-12-31)
  - Total: 5,309
  - Density: 65.20/km^{2} (168.9/sq mi)
- Time zone: UTC+01:00 (CET)
  - Summer (DST): UTC+02:00 (CEST)
- Postal codes: 97900
- Dialling codes: 09345
- Vehicle registration: TBB, MGH
- Website: www.kuelsheim.de

Külsheim (German pronunciation: [ˈkʏlshaɪm]) is a town in the Main-Tauber district, in Baden-Württemberg, Germany. It is situated 12 km northwest of Tauberbischofsheim, and 10 km south of Wertheim am Main.

== Town districts (former independent municipalities) ==
- Külsheim
- Eiersheim
- Hundheim
- Steinbach
- Steinfurt
- Uissigheim

== Twin towns ==
- Moret-sur-Loing, France, since 1972
- Pécsvárad, Hungary, since 1992
