= List of aircraft (Sk) =

This is a list of aircraft in alphabetical order beginning with 'Sk'.

== Sk ==
=== Skandinaviska Aero ===
(Skandinaviska Aero AB, Sweden / Erick Bratt, Karl-Erik Hilfing & Björn Törnblom / BHT)

- Skandinaviska Aero BHT-1 Beauty

=== Skif Paragliding ===
(Feodosia, Ukraine)

- Skif BigSkif Bi
- Skif Phaeton
- Skif Raptor
- Skif Sarmat
- Skif Skif-A

=== Skipper ===
(WA Skipper, Greeley, Colorado, United States)

- Skipper Scrappy UAC-200

=== Skliar ===
- Skliar Aqua Glider

=== Škoda ===
- Škoda D.1
- Škoda P.2

=== Škoda-Kauba ===
(Škoda-Kauba Flugzeugbau)

- Škoda-Kauba SK V-1
- Škoda-Kauba SK V-2
- Škoda-Kauba SK V-3
- Škoda-Kauba SK V-4
- Škoda-Kauba SK V-5
- Škoda-Kauba SK V-6
- Škoda-Kauba SK V-7
- Škoda-Kauba SK V-8
- Škoda-Kauba SK V-9
- Škoda-Kauba SK V-10
- Škoda-Kauba SK V-11
- Škoda-Kauba SK 257
- Škoda-Kauba SK SL-6 a modified SK V6 in order to perform tests for the Blohm & Voss P.208
- Škoda-Kauba SK P14 ramjet fighter project

=== Skopiński ===
(Aero-service Jacek Skopiński)

- Skopiński Panda
- Skopiński Puma

=== Skraba ===
(Boleslaw Skraba)

- Skraba S.T.3

=== Skroback ===
(Frank E. Skroback)

- Skroback Roadable Airplane

=== SKT Swiss Kopter Technology SA ===
(Ambrì, Switzerland)

- SKT Skyrider 06

=== Sky Romer ===
(Sky Romer Mfg Co, Inc., (Paul) Hobrock & Associates, Sweebrock Airport, Fort Wayne, Indiana, United States)

- Sky Romer

=== Sky Seeker Powerchutes ===
(Woking, Alberta, Canada)

- Sky Seeker Powerchutes Sky Seeker

=== Skye Treck ===
- Skye Treck Skyseeker Mk I
- Skye Treck Skyseeker Mk II
- Skye Treck Skyseeker Mk III

=== Skycraft ===
(Skycraft Inc (pres: James L Robertson), Ft Worth TX.)

- Skycraft Skyshark

=== SkyCraft ===
(SkyCraft Airplanes, LLC, Orem, Utah, United States)

- SkyCraft SD-1 Minisport

=== Skycrafters ===
(Skycraft Industries Inc, Venice Ca - see:Skylark)

=== SkyCruiser Autogyro ===
(SkyCruiser Autogyro KFT)

- SkyCruiser Autogyro SkyCruiser

=== SkyDancer Aviation ===
(Louisville, Kentucky, United States)

- SkyDancer SD-200
- SkyDancer SD-260
- SkyDancer SD-300

=== Skyeton ===
- Skyeton K-10 Swift

=== Skyfly ===
(Altbüron, Switzerland)

- Skyfly S 34 Skystar

=== Skyfox ===
(Skyfox Corporation, United States)

- Boeing Skyfox

=== Skyfox ===
(Skyfox Aviation, United States)

- Skyfox Aviation Skyfox

=== Skyhigh ===
(Skyhigh Ultralights Inc)

- Skyhigh Skybaby

=== Skyjam ===
(Skyjam Paragliders, Einsiedeln, Switzerland)

- Skyjam ST-Freestyle

=== Skylark Aircraft ===
(Skylark Aircraft Co., Muskegon. Michigan, United States)

- Skylark Aircraft 3
- Skylark Aircraft 3-95
- Skylark Aircraft 3-95A

=== Skylark ===
(Skylark Mfg Co, Skycrafters Industries Inc, 350 Washington Blvd, Venice, United States )

- Skylark Skycraft 246
- Skylark Skycraft 445
- Skylark Skycraft 446
- Skylark Skycraft 447

=== Skyleader Aircraft ===
(Skyleader Aircraft – Jihlavan Airplanes sro, Jihlava, Czech Republic)

- Skyleader GP One
- Skyleader 100
- Skyleader 200 UL
- Skyleader 500 LSA
- Skyleader 600
- Skyleader UL-39 Albi (a two-seat microlight version of the Aero L-39 Albatros)

=== Skyline ===
(Skyline Construction Bureau, Kyiv, Ukraine)

- Skyline SL-122 Pchelka
- Skyline SL-124
- Skyline SL-125
- Skyline SL-222

=== Skylon ===
- Skylon Concept

=== Skymaster Powered Parachutes ===
(Hartland, Wisconsin, United States)

- Skymaster Excel
- Skymaster Single Seater

=== Skyote ===
(Skyote Aeromarine Ltd, Boulder, Colorado, United States)

- Skyote Aeromarine Skyote

=== Sky Paragliders ===
(Frýdlant nad Ostravicí, Czech Republic)

- Sky Argos
- Sky Anakis
- Sky Apollo
- Sky Atis
- Sky Brontes
- Sky Eole
- Sky Fides
- Sky Flare
- Sky Flirt
- Sky Gaia
- Sky Golem
- Sky Kea
- Sky Metis
- Sky Paragliders Lift

=== Skyrider ===
(Skyrider Flugschule, Bayern, Germany)

- Skyrider Sonic
- Skyrider Stingray

=== Skyrider ===
(Skyrider Airships Inc.)

- Skyrider BA-3 (single seat airship)

=== Skyrunner Paramotor Laboratory ===
(Pskov, Russia)

- Skyrunner Basic
- Skyrunner Booster
- Skyrunner Light
- Skyrunner Powerful

=== Sky Science ===
(Tidworth, United Kingdom)

- Sky Science PowerHawk

=== Skyshooter ===
(Tubular Aircraft Prod Co, Los Angeles, California, United States)

- Skyshooter 211

=== Skyskootor ===
(Saalfield Aircraft Co, San Diego, California, United States)

- Skyskootor

=== Skytek ===
(Skytek Australia Pty. Ltd. Australia)

- Skytek Maverick

=== Skystar Aircraft ===
(Skystar Aircraft)

- Skystar Aircraft Pulsar

=== Skywalk GmbH & Co. KG ===
(Marquartstein, Bavaria, Germany)

- Skywalk Arriba
- Skywalk Cayenne
- Skywalk Chili
- Skywalk Hype
- Skywalk Join't
- Skywalk Masala
- Skywalk Mescal
- Skywalk Poison
- Skywalk Spice
- Skywalk Tequila
- Skywalk Tonic
- Skywalk Tonka
- Skywalk X-Alps

=== Skyway ===
(Skyway Engr Co, Carmel, Illinois, United States)

- Skyway AC-35

=== Skyway Products ===
(Ettenheim, Germany)

- Skyway Light

=== Skyways ===
(Skyways Inc, Boston, Maryland, United States)

- Skyways Amphibienne

=== Skywise Ultraflight ===
(Skywise Ultraflight Pte. Ltd.)

- Skywise Ultraflight SV-1 Sadler Vampire (KFM 107ER engine)
- Skywise Ultraflight SV-2 Sadler Vampire (Rotax 447 engine)
