= List of aircraft manufacturers (Q–S) =

This is a list of aircraft manufacturers sorted alphabetically by International Civil Aviation Organization (ICAO)/common name. It contains the ICAO/common name, manufacturer's name(s), country and other data, with the known years of operation in parentheses.

The ICAO names are listed in bold. Having an ICAO name does not mean that a manufacturer is still in operation today, just that some of the aircraft produced by that manufacturer are still flying.

== Q ==
- **Quad City**, Quad City Ultralight Aircraft Corp – United States
- Quasar, Dolní Bečva, Czech Republic
- **Quercy**, Centre National Quercy-Rouergue RSA – France
- **Quest**, Quest Aircraft Company LLC – United States
- **Questair**, Questair, Inc. – United States
- **Quickie**, Quickie Aircraft Corporation – United States
- **Quickie**, Quickie Enterprises, Inc. – United States
- **Quikkit**, Quikkit Corporation – United States
- **Quikkit**, Quikkit Division of Rainbow Flyers, Inc. – United States
- **Quikkit**, Quikkit, Inc. – United States
- **Qantas**, Qantas, Inc. Australia

== R ==
- **R & B**, R & B Aircraft Company – United States
- **RACA**, Representaciones Aero Comerciales Argentinas SA – Argentina
- **Radab**, AB Radab – Sweden
- **Radiant Power Corp.**, Radiant Power Corp. – A Heico Company – United States
- **RAF (1)**, Royal Aircraft Factory – United Kingdom, > Royal Aircraft Establishment
- Rad Aviation, Kidlington, United Kingdom
- **Ragwing**, RagWing Aircraft Designs – United States
- **Rainbow**, Rainbow Aircraft (Pty), Ltd. – South Africa
- **Rand**, Kenneth Rand – United States
- **Rand**, Rand Robinson Engineering, Inc. – United States
- Ranger Aircraft Corp. – United States (1929, Oklahoma City OK, upon acquiring design and production rights of Coffman Monoplanes Inc.)
- **Rans**, Rans, Inc. – United States (Randy Schlitter, Hays KS) kit-built small aircraft
- **Raven Rotorcraft**, Boulder Colorado and later El Prado, New Mexico, United States
- **Ravin**, SA Ravin Composite Aircraft Manufacturers – South Africa
- **Raytheon**, Raytheon Aircraft Company – United States
- **Raytheon**, Raytheon Corporate Jets, Inc. – United Kingdom
- **Rearwin**, Rearwin Aircraft & Engines, Inc. – United States
- **Rearwin**, Rearwin Airplanes, Inc. – United States
- **Reda**, Reda-MDT, Ltd. – Russia
- Redback Aviation, Hoppers Crossing, Victoria, Australia
- **Redfern**, Walter Redfern Company – United States
- **Reflex**, Reflex Fiberglass Works, Inc. – United States
- Reflex Paramoteur, Chatou, France
- **Regio Aviasi Industri**, PT. Regio Aviasi Industri - Indonesia
- Régy Frères, Régy Frères – France
- **Reims**, Reims Aviation SA – France
- **Renaissance (1)**, Renaissance Composites, Inc. – United States
- **Renaissance (2)**, Renaissance Aircraft LLC – United States
- **Renard**, Robert Renard – France
- **Renard**, George & Alfred Renard
- **Replica Plans**, Replica Plans – Canada
- **Republic**, Republic Aviation Corporation – United States, (1939–?)
- **Revolution**, Revolution Helicopter Corporation, Inc. – United States
- **Rhein**, Rhein-Flugzeugbau GmbH – Germany, (RFB)
- **Rhein-West-Flug**, Rhein-West-Flug Fischer und Companie – Germany
- **Rihn**, Dan Rihn – United States
- **Rihn**, Rihn Aircraft Corporation – United States
- Rikugun, Rikugun Kokugijutsu Kenkyujo – Japan, (Army Aerotechnical Research Institute)
- **Riley**, Riley Aeronautics Corporation – United States, (?-1983) > Advanced Aircraft Corp
- **Riley**, Riley Aircraft Corporation – United States
- **Riley**, Riley Aircraft Manufacturing, Inc. – United States
- **Riley**, Riley International Corporation – United States
- **Riley**, Riley Turbostream Corporation – United States
- **RLU**, Charles B. Roloff, Robert Liposky and Carl Unger – United States
- **Robin**, Avions Pierre Robin – France, (1969–present)
- **Robin**, Avions Pierre Robin, Inc. – Canada
- **Robin**, Robin Aviation – France
- **Robinson**, Robinson Helicopter Company – United States
- **Rock**, J. Rock Segelflugzeugbau – Germany
- **Rocket**, Rocket Aircraft Company – United States
- **Rockwell**, Rockwell International Corporation – United States, (1966–1996) > Boeing North American
- **Rockwell-MBB**, see ROCKWELL and MBB – United States/Germany
- **Rogerson Hiller**, Rogerson Hiller Corporation – United States
- Rogozarski, P. S. F. A. -Rogozarski – Yugoslavia, (1924–1941) (First Serbian Aircraft Factory-Rogozarski)
- Rokospol Aviation, Prague, Czech Republic
- **Rolladen-Schneider**, Rolladen-Schneider Flugzeugbau GmbH – Germany
- **Rollason**, Rollason Aircraft and Engines, Ltd. – United Kingdom
- Roll Flight, Schwelm, Germany
- **Romaero**, SC Romaero SA – Romania
- Rose, Rose Aeroplane and Motor Company – United States
- **Rotary Air Force**, Rotary Air Force, Inc. – Canada
- **Rotec**, Rotec Engineering, Inc. – United States
- Rotor Flight Dynamics, Wimauma, Florida, United States
- Rotortec GmbH, Görisried, Allgäu, Germany
- **RotorWay International**, Chandler, Arizona, United States
- **Rotorwing-Aero**, Salt Lake City, Utah, United States
- **Rouchaud**, F. Rouchaud, Construction Aéronautique – France
- **Rousseau**, Etablissements Rousseau Aéronautique – France
- **RTAF**, Royal Thai Air Force – Thailand
- **RUAG**, RUAG Aerospace – Switzerland
- Rumpler, Edmund Rumpler – Austria, (Rumpler Flugzeugwerke GmbH)
- **Rupert**, Charles Rupert Joses – Brazil
- **Ruschmeyer**, Ruschmeyer Luftfahrttechnik GmbH – Germany
- Rusjan Brothers, Rusjan Brothers – Austro-Hungarian Empire, (Edvard & Josiph (Jože) Rusjan)
- **Rutan**, Rutan Aircraft Factory – United States, (Scaled Composites)
- RWD, Rogalski, Wigura and Drzewiecki – Poland
- **Ryan**, Ryan Aeronautical Company – United States

== S ==
- **S-PLANE Automation**, S-PLANE Automation (Pty) Ltd – South Africa
- **Saab AB**, Saab AB – Sweden
- **Saab**, Saab Aircraft AB – Sweden
- **Saab**, Saab-Scania AB – Sweden
- **Saab**, Svenska Aeroplan AB Saab – Sweden
- **Saab-Fairchild**, see SAAB and FAIRCHILD – Sweden/United States
- **SAASA**, Servicios Aéreas de America SA – Mexico
- Sabrina Aircraft Manufacturing – United States
- **SABCA**, Société Anonyme Belge de Constructions Aéronautiques – Belgium
- **Sadler**, Sadler Aircraft Corporation – United States
- **SAI (1)**, Skandinavisk Aero Industri AS – Denmark
- **SAI (2)**, SAI Società Aeronautica Italiana srl – Italy
- Sailplane Corporation of America – United States
- **Saint Germain**, Centre de Recherches Jean Saint Germain, Inc. – Canada
- **Salvay-Stark**, M. E. Salvay and George Stark – United States
- Samolot, Poland
- **Samsung**, Samsung Aerospace Industries Ltd – South Korea, (SSA) > Korea Aerospace Industries
- **SAN**, Société Aéronautique Normande – France
- Sanderson, Sanderson Machine Corporation – United States
- **Sands**, Ron Sands Company – United States
- **Sargent-Fletcher**, Sargent-Fletcher Company – United States
- **SATIC**, Special Aircraft Transport International Company – France/Germany
- **SAU**, Nauchno-Proizvodstvennaya Korporatsiya Samoloty-Amfibyi Universalnyye – Russia
- Saunders Aircraft, Saunders Aircraft Corporation – Canada
- Saunders-Roe, Saunders-Roe Limited – United Kingdom
- **Sauper**, Sauper Aviation SA – France
- **Sauser**, Sauser Aircraft Company – United States
- Savoia-Marchetti, Savoia-Marchetti – Italy, (1915–1951 & 1953–1983)
- **Scaled**, Scaled Composites, Inc. – United States
- **Scaled Aviation Industries (Private) Limited**, Scaled Aviation Industries (Private) Limited – Pakistan
- **SCAN**, Société des Constructions Aéro-Navales – France
- **SCANOR**, Société de Construction Aéronautique du Nord – France
- **Scenic**, Scenic Aviation Services – United States
- **Schafer**, Schafer Aircraft Modifications, Inc. – United States
- **Scheibe**, Scheibe Flugzeugbau GmbH – Germany
- **Schempp-Hirth**, Schempp-Hirth Flugzeugbau GmbH – Germany
- **Schempp-Hirth**, Schempp-Hirth GmbH – Germany
- **Schempp-Hirth**, Schempp-Hirth GmbH & Companie KG – Germany
- **Schempp-Hirth**, Schempp-Hirth OHG – Germany
- **Schleicher**, Alexander Schleicher GmbH & Co – Germany
- **Schleicher**, Alexander Schleicher Segelflugzeugbau – Germany
- Schneider, Edmund Schneider – Germany, Australia
- **Schweizer**, Schweizer Aircraft Corporation – United States
- **Scintex**, Scintex Aviation SA – France
- **Scottish Aviation**, Scottish Aviation, Ltd. – United Kingdom, (?-1977) > British Aerospace
- SC Paragliding, Kharkiv, Ukraine
- **SCWAL**, SCWAL SA – Belgium
- SEA, Société d'Etudes Aéronautiques – France
- **Seabird**, Seabird Aviation Australia Pty, Ltd. – Australia
- **Seabird**, Seabird Aviation Jordan LLC – Jordan
- **Seastar**, SeaStar Aircraft, Inc. – United States
- SET, Societatea pentru exploatari technice – Romania
- **Seawind**, Seawind, Inc. – United States
- **Seat Air Systems, Inc.**, Seat Air Systems, Inc.,- United States
- **Seawind**, Seawind International, Inc. – Canada
- **Seawind**, SNA, Inc. – United States
- SECM, SECM – France, (1916–1921) > Amiot
- Seedwings Europe, Schlitters, Austria
- SEGA Aircraft, SEGA Aircraft – Belgium
- **Seginus Inc**, Seginus Inc – United States
- **Sepecat**, Société Européenne de Production de l'Avion ECAT – France/United Kingdom
- **Sequoia**, Sequoia Aircraft Corporation – United States
- SEREB, SEREB – France, (1959–1970) (Ballistic Missiles Study and Manufacture Company) > Aérospatiale
- **Serv-Aero**, Serv-Aero Engineering, Inc. – United States
- **Servoplant**, Servoplant SRL – Romania
- SETCA Société d'Études Techniques et de Constructions Aéronautiques – France
- Seversky, Seversky Aircraft Corporation – United States, > Republic Aviation Company
- **SF**, Swiss Aircraft and Systems Enterprise Corporation – Switzerland
- SFECMAS, Societe Francaise d'Etudes et de Constructions de Materials – France, (1953–1955) (Société Française d'Etude et de Construction de Matériels Aéronautiques Spéciaux – French Company for the study and construction of special aeronautical materials) > SNCAN
- SFERMA, Société Française d'Entretien et de Reparation de Matériel Aéronautique – France, (Maintenance and Aeronautical Material Repairs Company of France)
- **SG Aviation**, SG Aviation – Italy
- **SGAU**, Samarsky Gosudartvennyi Aerokosmitsesky Universitet – Russia
- **Shaanxi**, Shaanxi Aircraft Company – China
- **Shaanxi**, Shaanxi Transport Aircraft Factory – China
- **Shadin**, Shadin LP – United States
- **Shanghai**, Shanghai Aircraft Manufacturing Factory – China
- **Shanghai**, Shanghai Aviation Industrial Corporation – China
- **Shanghai Sikorsky**, Shanghai Sikorsky Aircraft Company, Ltd. – China
- **Shenyang**, Shenyang Aircraft Corporation – China
- **Shenyang**, Shenyang Aircraft Factory – China
- **Shenyang Sailplane**, Shenyang Sailplane and Lightplane Factory – China
- **Shenyang Sailplane**, Shenyang Sailplane Factory – China
- **Sherpa**, Sherpa Aircraft Manufacturing Company – United States
- **Shijiazhuang**, Shijiazhuang Aircraft Manufacturing Corporation – China
- **Shijiazhuang**, Shijiazhuang Aircraft Plant – China
- **Shin Meiwa**, Shin Meiwa Industry Company, Ltd. – Japan
- **Shin Meiwa**, ShinMaywa Industries, Ltd. – Japan
- **Shin Meiwa**, ShinMaywa Kogyo KK – Japan
- **Shinn**, Shinn Engineering, Inc. – United States
- **Short**, Short Brothers & Harland, Ltd. – United Kingdom, (?-1989) > Bombardier Aerospace
- **Short**, Short Brothers, Ltd. – United Kingdom
- **Short**, Short Brothers PLC – United Kingdom
- Showa, Showa Aircraft Industry Co., Ltd. – Japan
- **Showers-Aero**, Milton, Pennsylvania, United States
- **SIAI-Marchetti**, SIAI-Marchetti SpA – Italy
- **SIAT**, Siebelwerke-ATG GmbH – Germany
- Siddeley-Deasy, Siddeley-Deasy Motor Car Co., Ltd.. – United Kingdom, > Armstrong Siddeley
- Siebel, Siebel-Flugzeugwerke AG – Germany, (1955–1970) (Siebel Aircraft Factory) > MBB
- Siemens-Schuckert, Siemens-Schuckertwerke – Germany
- **Sikorsky**, Sikorsky Aircraft Division of United Aircraft Corporation – United States
- **Sikorsky**, Sikorsky Aircraft Division of United Technologies Corporation – United States
- **Silhouette**, Silhouette Aircraft, Inc. – United States
- **Silvaire**, Silvaire Aircraft Company – United States
- **Silvercraft**, Silvercraft SpA – Italy
- **Sindlinger**, Fred G. Sindlinger – United States
- **Singapore**, Singapore Aerospace, Ltd. – Singapore
- **Singapore**, Singapore Aircraft Industries Pte, Ltd. – Singapore
- **Singapore**, Singapore Technologies Aerospace, Ltd. – Singapore
- Sino Swearingen Aircraft Corporation – United States/China-Taiwan
- **SIPA**, Société Industrielle pour l'Aéronautique – France
- **Siravia**, Siravia SA – France
- **Sisler**, Sisler Aircraft Company – United States
- SITAR, Sociètè Industrielle de Tolerie pour l'Aéronautique et Matériel Roulant – France
- **Sivel**, Sivel Srl – Italy
- Skif Paragliding, Feodosia, Ukraine
- Skliar, Bill Skliar – United States
- **Skycraft**, Skycraft International, Inc. – United States
- **Skydancer**, SkyDancer Aviation – United States
- **Skyfox**, Skyfox Aviation, Ltd. – Australia
- **Skygear**, Korean Light Aircraft Corporation – South Korea
- **Skyleader**, Jihlava, Czech Republic
- Skymaster Powered Parachutes, Hartland, Wisconsin, United States
- **Skyote Aeromarine**, Skyote Aeromarine, Ltd. – United States
- Sky Paragliders, Frýdlant nad Ostravicí, Czech Republic
- **Skyrider Flugschule** – Germany
- Skyrunner Paramotor Laboratory, Pskov, Russia
- Sky Science, Tidworth, United Kingdom
- **Skystar**, Skystar Aircraft Corporation – United States
- Skywalk GmbH & Co. KG, Marquartstein, Bavaria, Germany
- Skyway Products, Ettenheim, Germany
- **Slepcev**, Slepcev Aircraft Industries – Australia
- **Sling**, Sling Aircraft - South Africa
- **Slingsby**, Slingsby Aviation, Ltd. – United Kingdom
- **Slipstream**, SlipStream Industries, Inc. – United States
- **SMAN**, Société Morbihannaise d'Aéro Navigation – France
- **SME**, SME Aviation Sdn Bhd – Malaysia
- **Smith (1)**, Frank W. Smith – United States
- **Smith (2)**, Wilbur L. Smith – United States
- **Smith (3)**, Barry Smith – United Kingdom
- **Smyth**, Jerry Smyth – United States
- SNCA, Société Nationale de Constructions Aéronautiques – France
- SNCAC, Société Nationale de Constructions Aéronautiques du Centre – France, (1936–1949) (SNCAC) (Aérocentre) > SNCAN, SNCASO, SNECMA
- SNCAN, Société Nationale de Construction Aéronautique du Nord – France
- SNCAO, Société Nationale des Constructions Aéronautiques de l'Ouest – France
- SNCASO – France
- SNECMA, Société Nationale d'Étude et de Construction de Moteurs d'Aviation – France, (1956–1959) (National Company for the Study and Construction of Aviation Engines)
- **Snobird**, SnoBird, Inc. – United States
- **Snow**, Snow Aeronautical Company – United States
- **Snow**, Snow Aeronautical Corporation – United States
- **Soaring Concepts**, Sturgis, Michigan, United States
- Société Nouvelle d'Aviation Sportive (Stryke-Air), Noillac, France
- **SOCA**, Société de l'Ouest de Construction Aéronautique – France
- **SOCATA**, Socata Group Aerospatiale – France
- **SOCATA**, Socata Group Aerospatiale Matra – France
- **SOCATA**, Société de Construction d'Avions de Tourisme et d'Affaires – France
- **Soko**, Preduzece Soko – Bosnia-Hercegovina
- **Soko**, Soko Air Mostar – Bosnia-Hercegovina
- **Soko**, Soko Metalopreradijavacka Industrija sa Organicenom Solidarnom Odgovornoscu Oour-A Oour Fabrika Vazduhoplova – Bosnia-Hercegovina
- **Soko**, Soko Vazduhoplovna Industrija Radna Organizacija Vazduhoplovstvo – Bosnia-Hercegovina
- **Soko**, Sour Vazduhoplovna Industrija Soko – Bosnia-Hercegovina
- **Soko**, Vazduhoplovna Industrija Soko DD – Bosnia-Hercegovina
- **Soko-Cniar**, see SOKO and CNIAR – Bosnia-Hercegovina/Romania
- Sokopf, Innsbruck, Austria
- **Solar Turbines** – Solar Aircraft Company – United States
- Solar Wings, United Kingdom
- **Solid Air UL-Bau Franz** – Hundheim, Rheinland-Pfalz, Germany
- Solo Wings, Gillitts, KwaZulu-Natal, South Africa
- **Soloy**, Soloy Conversions, Ltd. – United States
- Sol Paragliders, Jaraguá do Sul, Brazil
- **Sonex**, Sonex, Ltd. – United States
- **Sopwith**, The Sopwith Aviation Company, Ltd. – United Kingdom
- **Sorrell Aviation**, C. Hobart Sorrell, Tenino, Washington, United States
- **Sorrell**, Sorrell Aviation – United States
- SPAD, Société Pour L'Aviation et ses Dérivés – France, (1910–1914) (1914-Post war) (Originally Société Pour les Appareils Deperdussin) > Blériot-SPAD
- Southern Powered Parachutes, Nicholson, Georgia, United States, (formerly called Condor Powered Parachutes)
- **Spartan**, Spartan Aircraft Company – United States
- Spartan Aircraft Ltd, United Kingdom
- Spartan Microlights, Astoria, New York, United States
- **Specter Aircraft**, Bancroft, Idaho, United States
- Spectrum Aeronautical – United States
- Spectrum Aircraft – (1983–1992) – Canada
- **Speedtwin**, Speedtwin Developments, Ltd. – United Kingdom
- **Spencer**, P. H. Spencer – United States
- **Spencer**, Spencer Amphibian Aircraft, Inc. – United States
- Sperwill Ltd, Bristol, United Kingdom
- **Spezio**, Tony and Dorothy Spezio – United States
- **Spitfire**, Spitfire Helicopter Company, Ltd. – United States
- **Spirit**, Spirit AeroSystems, Inc. – United States
- Sport 2000, Capena, Italy
- **Sport Racer**, Sport Racer, Inc. – United States
- **Sportavia-Putzer**, Sportavia-Pützer GmbH u. Co. KG – Germany
- **Spratt**, George G. Spratt – United States
- **Spring**, W. Spring – Canada
- **SSH**, Serwis Samolotow Historycznich – Poland
- **St. Croix**, St. Croix Aircraft – United States
- **St. Just**, St. Just Aviation, Inc. – Canada
- **Stampe**, Stampe & Renard – Belgium
- **Stampe**, Stampe & Vertongen – Belgium
- Standard Aircraft Corporation, Standard Aircraft Corporation – United States
- Standard Motors, Standard Motor Company – United Kingdom
- **Starck**, André Starck – France
- **Starfire**, Starfire Aviation, Inc. – United States
- Stargate, Inc, McMinnville, Oregon, United States
- **Stark**, Stark Flugzeugbau KG – Germany
- **Stark**, Stark Iberica SA – Spain
- **Starkraft**, Starkraft – United States
- **Stark-Trefethen**, George Stark and Al Trefethen – United States
- **Star-Lite**, Star-Lite Aircraft – United States
- **Starpac**, Star of Phoenix Aircraft – United States
- **Statler**, William H. Statler – United States
- **Staudacher**, Staudacher Aircraft, Inc. – United States
- **Stavatti**, Stavatti Aerospace Ltd – United States
- **Stearman**, Stearman Aircraft Company – United States, (1927–1939) > Boeing
- **Steen**, Lamar Steen – United States
- **Stemme**, Stemme Gmbh & Co KG – Germany
- **Stephens**, C. L. Stephens – United States
- **Stern**, René Stern – France
- **Stern-Mallick**, René Stern et Richard Mallick – France
- **Stewart Aircraft Corporation**, Stewart Aircraft Corporation – United States
- **Donald Stewart**, Donald Stewart – United States
- W.F. Stewart Company, Flint, Michigan, United States
- **Stinson**, Stinson Aircraft Corporation – United States
- **Stinson**, Stinson Division of Consolidated Vultee Corporation – United States
- **Stits**, Stits Aircraft – United States
- **Stoddard-Hamilton**, Stoddard-Hamilton Aircraft, Inc. – United States
- **Stolp**, Louis A. Stolp – United States
- **Storch Aviation**, Storch Aviation Australia Pty, Ltd. – Australia
- **Storm Aircraft**, also called the StormAircraft Group, Sabaudia, Italy
- Stout, Stout Metal Airplane Company – United States
- Stratos Aircraft, Redmond, Oregon, United States
- **Streamline Welding**, Streamline Welding, Inc. – Canada
- **Striplin**, Striplin Aircraft Corporation – United States
- **Strojnik**, Prof. Alex Strojnik – United States
- Stroukoff, Stroukoff Aircraft Corp. – United States
- **SUD**, Sud-Aviation, Société Nationale de Constructions Aéronautiques – France, (1957–1970) > Aérospatiale
- **Sud-Est**, Société Nationale de Constructions Aéronautiques du Sud-Est – France, (?-1957) (SNCASE) > Sud-Aviation
- **Sud-Est**, Sud-Est Aviation – France
- **Sudflug**, Flugzeug-Union-Süd – Germany
- **Sud-Ouest**, Ouest-Aviation – France, (1936–1957) (SNCASO) > Sud-Aviation
- **Sud-Ouest**, Société Nationale de Constructions Aéronautiques du Sud-Ouest – France
- **Sukhoi**, Gosudarstvennoye Unitarnoye Predpriyatie Aviatsionnyi Voyenno-Promyshlennyi Komplex Sukhoi – Russia, (1939–present)
- **Sukhoi**, Opytnyi Konstruktorskoye Buro Sukhogo AOOT – Russia
- **Sukhoi**, Sukhoi OKB – Russia
- **Summit**, Summit Aviation, Inc. – United States
- Sun Lake, Sun Lake Aircraft – United States
- **Sunderland**, Sunderland Aircraft – United States
- Sundog Powerchutes Inc, Pierceland, Saskatchewan, Canada
- Sun Flightcraft (Hofbauer GmbH), Innsbruck, Austria
- **Supapup**, Supapup Aircraft, Division of Teknico Pty, Ltd. – Australia
- **Super-Chipmunk**, Super-Chipmunk, Inc. – Canada
- **Supermarine**, Supermarine Aviation Works (Vickers), Ltd. – United Kingdom
- **Supermarine**, Vickers-Armstrongs (Aircraft), Ltd. (Supermarine Division) – United Kingdom
- **Supermarine**, Vickers-Armstrongs, Ltd. (Aircraft Section) (Supermarine Division) – United Kingdom
- **Supermarine Aircraft**, Supermarine Aircraft PL – Australia
- Suresnes – see Ateliers Aéronautiques de Suresnes
- **Svenska Aero**, Svenska Aero – Sweden
- Swallow, Swallow Airplane Company – United States
- **Swearingen**, Swearingen Aircraft – United States
- **Swearingen**, Swearingen Aircraft Corporation – United States
- **Swearingen**, Swearingen Aircraft, Inc. – United States
- **Swearingen**, Swearingen Aviation Corporation – United States
- **Swearingen**, Swearingen Engineering and Technology, Inc. – United States
- **Swift Aircraft** – Swift Aircraft, Norwich – United Kingdom
- Swing Flugsportgeräte, Landsberied, Germany
- Swing-Europe, Ebringen, Germany
- **Symphony Aircraft Industries** – Trois-Rivieres, Quebec, Canada
- **Synairgie**, Synairgie – France
- **SZD**, Przedsiebiorstwo Doswiadczalno Produkcyjne Szybownictwa-Panstwowe Zaklady Lotnice Bielsko – Poland
- **SZD**, Szybowcowy Zaklad Doswiadczalny – Poland

== See also ==
- Aircraft
- List of aircraft engine manufacturers
- List of aircraft manufacturers
