= Freestyle =

Freestyle may refer to:

== Brands ==
- Reebok Freestyle, a women's athletic shoe
- Ford Freestyle, an SUV automobile
- Coca-Cola Freestyle, a vending machine
- Abbott FreeStyle, a blood glucose monitor by Abbott Laboritories

== Media ==
- FreeStyle, a television show on HGTV
- Free Style (film), a 2009 American film
- Freestyle (radio program), a radio program on CBC's Radio One
- FreeStyleGames, a UK video game developer
- Freestyle Releasing, an independent film studio
- Freestyle (software), a renderer for non-photorealistic line drawing from 3D scenes
- Freestyle: The Art of Rhyme, a 2000 documentary film about freestyle rap
- Freestyle (graphic novel), a 2022 graphic novel by Gale Galligan

== Music ==
- Freestyle music
- Freestyle rap

=== Performers and groups ===
- Freestyle, an American electro-funk band on the compilation album Street Sounds Electro 10
- Freestyle (Filipino band), an alternative-soul jazz-RnB band from the Philippines
- Freestyle (Russian group), a Soviet group with frontman Vadim Kazachenko
- Freestyle (rapper), member of Arsonists
- Freestyle (Swedish band), a short-lived Swedish electronic band
- Freestylers, a British electronic music group

=== Albums ===
- Freestyle, album by Ayibobo, 1993

=== Songs ===
- "Freestyler" (song), 1999
- "Freestyle" (Lil Baby song), 2017
- "Freestyle" (Rod Wave song), 2020
- "Freestyle" (Lady Antebellum song), 2014
- "Freestyle 4", 2016
- "Freestyle", by P.O.D. from The Fundamental Elements of Southtown, 1999
- "Freestyle", by DJ Kay Slay from The Streetsweeper, Vol. 1, 2003
- "Freestyle", by Just-Ice from Gun Talk, 1993
- "Freestyle", by OsamaSon from Flex Musix, 2023

== Sports ==
- Freestyle aerobics
- Freestyle BMX
- Freestyle chess
- Freestyle dressage
- Freestyle fighting
- Freestyle fixed gear
- Freestyle footbag
- Freestyle football
- Freestyle frisbee
- Freestyle kayaking
- Freestyle (monster trucks)
- Freestyle motocross
- Freestyle nunchaku
- Freestyle scootering
- Freestyle skateboarding
- Freestyle skiing
- Freestyle skydiving
- Freestyle slalom skating
- Freestyle snowboarding
- Freestyle swimming
- Freestyle wrestling
- Musical canine freestyle

== Other ==
- Freestyle (art exhibition)
- Freestyle dance
- Freestyle (roller coaster)
- Freestyle Music Park, South Carolina, US
- Skyjam ST-Freestyle, a Swiss powered paraglider
- Freestyle, NATO reporting name for the Yakovlev Yak-141, a Soviet VTOL aircraft
