= Sky Shark (disambiguation) =

Sky Shark is an alternate title for the arcade game Flying Shark

Sky Shark or Sky Sharks may also refer to:

== Aircraft ==
- Douglas A2D Skyshark, an attack aircraft
- Skycraft Skyshark, an aircraft by Skycraft, see List of aircraft

== Media ==
- Sky Sharks, a 2020 film
- The Sky Shark, a Topper comic strip
- Sky Sharks, a 2007 comic by Fred Perry
- "Sky Sharks", an episode of the television series Street Sharks
- "Sky Sharks", a song from the 2015 album The Good Dinosaur by Mychael and Jeff Danna
- "Sky Sharks", a song from the 2015 album The Vice Quadrant: A Space Opera by Steam Powered Giraffe

== Fictional elements ==
- Skyshark, a Marvel Comics character
- Sky Shark, a fictional mother ship in the film Ultraman Zearth
- Sky Shark, a fictional robot in the television series Super Robot Red Baron
- The Skysharks, a group of pilots in the comic book Top 10: The Forty-Niners, see List of Top 10 characters

== Other ==
- Sky Shark, a radio-controlled aircraft in the Air Hogs toy line
- Sky Shark, an amusement park ride at Magic Springs
- Skyshark (cluster bomb), an Italian guided cluster bomb dispenser created by a joint venture between Aeritalia and SNIA
