= Aero-Service =

Aero-Service may refer to:

- Aéro-Service and airline based in the Republic of the Congo
- Aero-Service Jacek Skopiński, a Polish aircraft manufacturer
