= SMAN =

SMAN may refer to:

- A public school classification in Indonesia, see List of schools in Indonesia § Schools in Indonesia
- Lawa Antino Airstrip, ICAO code
- Société Morbihannaise d'Aéro Navigation, see List of aircraft manufacturers (Q–S)

== See also ==
- Smen
