= Skymaster =

Skymaster may refer to:

== Airlines ==
- Skymaster Airlines, a defunct Brazilian airline
- Skymaster Air Taxi, a defunct American airline

== Aircraft ==
- Cessna Skymaster, an American civil aircraft design
- Cessna O-2 Skymaster, an American military aircraft design
- Douglas C-54 Skymaster, an American military aircraft design (a variant of Douglas DC-4, which was sometimes also known as Skymaster.)

== Other uses ==
- Skymaster (ride), a pendulum amusement ride
- Skymaster Powered Parachutes, an American powered parachute manufacturer
- Zeiss Skymaster, a line of planetarium projectors

== Characters with the name ==
- Skrullian Skymaster, a member of Marvel Comics' Squadron Supreme
