= Light aircraft manufacturers in the Czech Republic =

Czechoslovakia had a significant history in producing aircraft, but the aeronautical industry was extremely influenced by several negative factors at the end of the 1980s. The collapse of the East European market, combined with the global recession reduced the production of all aircraft manufacturers.

Since 1990, many small private companies specializing mainly in the production of light sporting aircraft were founded. These firms are headed by very experienced engineers and workers, being former employees of big state owned aeronautical factories. By 2003, the Czech Republic became the third largest manufacturer of such planes in Europe (after France and Germany), with over 500 light aircraft produced yearly.

Incomplete list of manufacturers:

- ATEC v.o.s.
- BRM Aero
- Czech Sport Aircraft
- Dova Aircraft
- Evektor-Aerotechnik
- InterPlane Aircraft
- Skyleader
- TL-Ultralight
- UL-Jih
- Urban Air
