= Ramphos Trident =

Italian amphibious ultralight trike

Trident
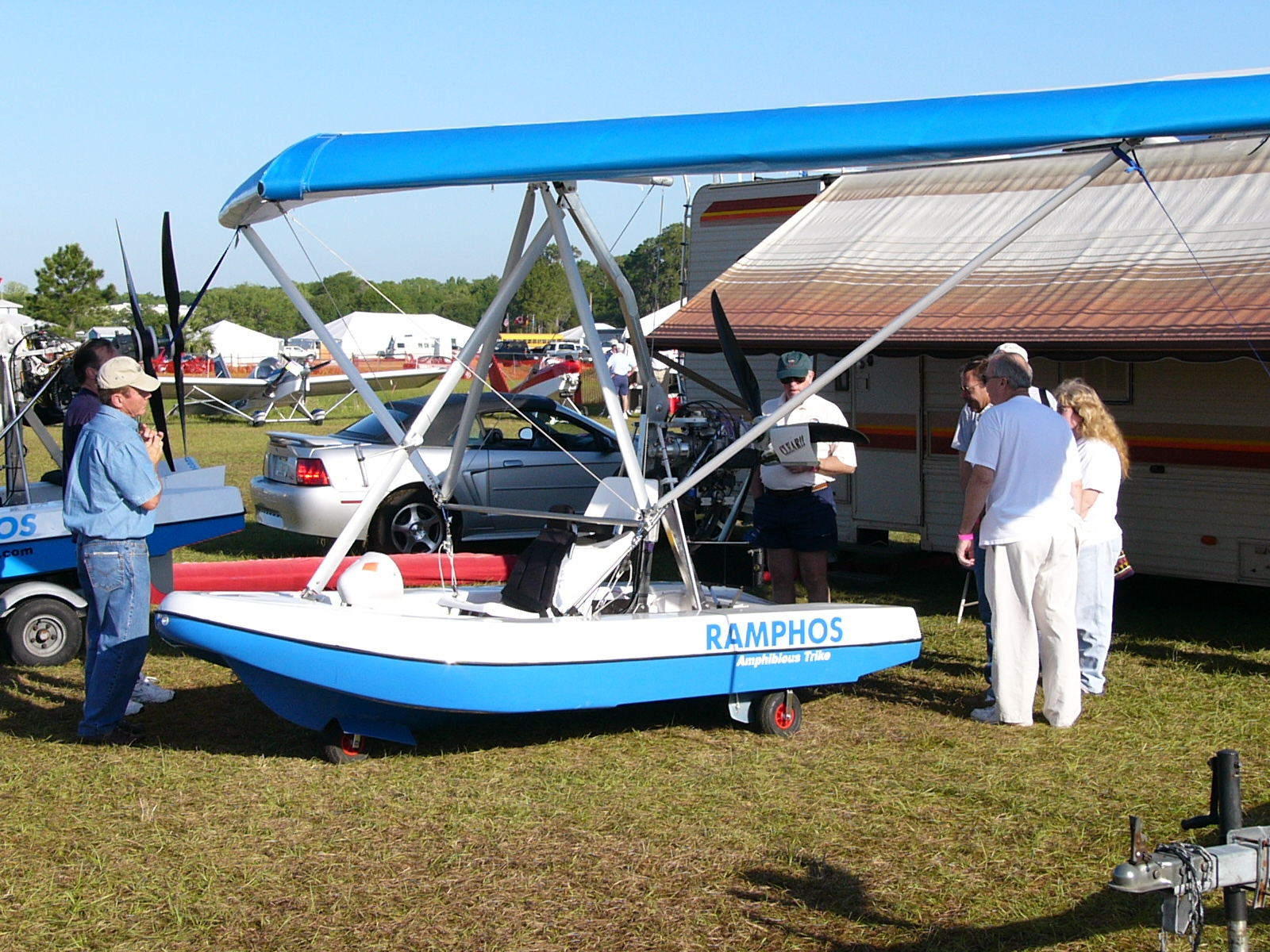
- Ramphos Trident

General information
- Type: Ultralight trike
- National origin: Italy
- Manufacturer: Ramphos
- Status: In production (2013)

History
- Introduction date: 1998

The Ramphos Trident is an Italian amphibious ultralight trike, designed and produced by Ramphos of Fontanafredda. The aircraft is supplied as a kit for amateur construction or as a complete ready-to-fly-aircraft.

== Design and development ==
The Trident was designed to comply with the Fédération Aéronautique Internationale microlight category, including the category's maximum gross weight of 450 kg (992 lb). The Trident features a strut-braced hang glider-style high-wing, weight-shift controls, a two-seats-in-tandem open cockpit with a rigid boat hull, retractable tricycle landing gear and a single engine in pusher configuration.

The aircraft is made from bolted-together aluminum tubing, with its double surface wing covered in Dacron sailcloth and its boat hull made from either fibreglass or carbon fibre and Kevlar. Its 10.5 m (34.4 ft) span Hazard wing has struts and uses an "A" frame weight-shift control bar. The powerplant is a twin cylinder, liquid-cooled, two-stroke, dual-ignition 64 hp (48 kW) Rotax 582 engine or a four-cylinder, air and liquid-cooled, four-stroke, dual-ignition 80 hp (60 kW) Rotax 912UL engine or a 78 hp (58 kW) converted Smart Car four stroke turbocharged engine. All engines are fitted with a clutch that stops the propeller from turning when the engine is at idle to permit water handling. The boat hull features a water rudder.

Starting in 2005 the frame and wing portion of the aircraft was taken from the Skyrider Sonic ultralight trike, built by Skyrider Flugschule.

== Variants ==
Hydro
Initial flying boat model that lacks wheeled landing gear. Introduced in 1998 and in production in 2013.
Trident
Amphibious model with fibreglass boat hull, in production in 2013.
C
Amphibious model with carbon fibre/Kevlar boat hull and lexan windows in the bottom of the hull to allow visibility downwards. In production in 2013.

== Specifications (Trident) ==
Data from Bayerl

General characteristics

- Crew: one
- Capacity: one passenger
- Wingspan: 10.5 m (34 ft 5 in)
- Wing area: 15 m^{2} (160 sq ft)
- Empty weight: 200 kg (441 lb)
- Powerplant: 1 × Rotax 912UL four cylinder, liquid and air-cooled, four stroke aircraft engine, 60 kW (80 hp)
- Propellers: 2-bladed composite
