= Reflex Bi Trike =

French paramotor

Bi Trike

General information
- Type: Paramotor
- National origin: France
- Manufacturer: Reflex Paramoteur
- Designer: Dominique Cholou
- Status: Production completed

The Reflex Bi Trike is a French paramotor that was designed by Dominique Cholou and produced by Reflex Paramoteur of Chatou for powered paragliding. Now out of production, when it was available the aircraft was supplied complete and ready-to-fly.

== Design and development ==
The Bi Trike was designed to comply with the European microlight regulations. It features a paraglider-style wing, two-place-in-tandem accommodation and a single Simonini Racing 25 hp (19 kW) engine in pusher configuration with a 2.38:1 ratio reduction drive and a 123 cm (48 in) diameter three-bladed composite propeller. The fuel tank capacity is 10 litres (2.2 imp gal; 2.6 US gal).

As is the case with all paramotors, take-off and landing is accomplished by foot, although an optional wheeled carriage can be employed with this model. Inflight steering is accomplished via handles that actuate the canopy brakes, creating roll and yaw.

== Specifications (Bi Trike) ==
Data from Bertrand

General characteristics

- Crew: one
- Capacity: one passenger
- Empty weight: 40 kg (88 lb)
- Fuel capacity: 10 litres (2.2 imp gal; 2.6 US gal)
- Powerplant: 1 × Simonini Racing single cylinder, two-stroke, air-cooled aircraft engine, with a 2.38:1 reduction drive, 19 kW (25 hp)
- Propellers: 3-bladed composite, ground adjustable, 1.23 m (4 ft 0 in) diameter
