= Stitz =

Stitz is a surname. Notable people with the surname include:

- Hermann Stitz (1868–1947), German biologist and entomologist
- Ilka Stitz (born 1960), German writer of historical thrillers
- Norma Stitz (born 1956), American fetish model

== See also ==
- Stits, surname
