= Stits =

Stits is a surname. Notable people with the surname include:

- Bill Stits (1931–2011), American football safety
- Ray Stits (1921–2015), American inventor, homebuilt aircraft designer, aircraft mechanic and pilot

== See also ==
- Stitz, surname
