= Skyrider Sonic =

German ultralight trike

Sonic

General information
- Type: Ultralight trike
- National origin: Germany
- Manufacturer: Skyrider Flugschule
- Status: In production (2011)

The Skyrider Sonic is a German ultralight trike, designed and produced by Skyrider Flugschule. The aircraft is supplied as a complete ready-to-fly-aircraft.

== Design and development ==
The Sonic was designed to comply with the Fédération Aéronautique Internationale microlight category, including the category's maximum gross weight of 450 kg (992 lb). The aircraft has a maximum gross weight of 450 kg (992 lb). It features a strut-braced hang glider-style high-wing, weight-shift controls, a two-seats-in-tandem open cockpit, tricycle landing gear and a single engine in pusher configuration.

The aircraft is made from square welded stainless steel tubing, with its double surface wing covered in Dacron sailcloth. Its 9.8 m (32.2 ft) span Hazard 12 wing is supported by struts and uses an "A" frame weight-shift control bar. The powerplant is a four stroke turbocharged 85 hp (63 kW) Smart Car automotive conversion engine or, optionally, a twin cylinder, liquid-cooled, two-stroke, dual-ignition 64 hp (48 kW) Rotax 582 aircraft engine.

With the Smart car engine the Sonic has an empty weight of 165 kg (364 lb) and a gross weight of 450 kg (992 lb), giving a useful load of 285 kg (628 lb). With full fuel of 60 litres (13 imp gal; 16 US gal) the payload is 221 kg (487 lb).

The Sonic's trike structure is also incorporated in the Ramphos Trident amphibious trike.

== Specifications (Sonic) ==
Data from Bayerl

General characteristics

- Crew: one
- Capacity: one passenger
- Wingspan: 9.8 m (32 ft 2 in)
- Wing area: 12 m^{2} (130 sq ft)
- Empty weight: 165 kg (364 lb)
- Gross weight: 450 kg (992 lb)
- Fuel capacity: 60 litres (13 imp gal; 16 US gal)
- Powerplant: 1 × Smart Car turbocharged, four stroke automotive engine, 63 kW (85 hp)
- Propellers: 3-bladed composite

Performance

- Maximum speed: 160 km/h (99 mph, 86 kn)
- Cruise speed: 125 km/h (78 mph, 67 kn)
- Stall speed: 55 km/h (34 mph, 30 kn)
- Rate of climb: 7.5 m/s (1,480 ft/min)
- Wing loading: 37.5 kg/m^{2} (7.7 lb/sq ft)
