= Skliar Aqua Glider =

Aqua Glider

General information
- Type: Recreational glider
- Manufacturer: Homebuilt
- Designer: Bill Skliar

History
- First flight: 1959

The Skliar Aqua Glider or Explorer was a small glider aircraft designed and built in the United States in 1959 and subsequently marketed for homebuilding. Designed by USAF Lt Col Bill Skliar and built by him and a troop of Air Explorers, it was a pontoon-equipped biplane intended to be towed behind a speedboat. Using a tow-rope of between 150 and 400 ft (45 and 120 m), the glider could reach a maximum altitude of 70% the length of the rope when the speedboat reached 35 mph (55 km/h). At this point, the rope would be released, and the glider would return to land on the water.

Later modifications replaced the pontoons with landing skids fashioned from automobile leaf springs, and the addition of twin McCulloch MC70 engines driving a common propeller in an unsuccessful attempt to motorise the aircraft. The prototype was later donated to the EAA AirVenture Museum.

== Specifications (prototype) ==
General characteristics

- Crew: 1 pilot
- Length: 13 ft 8 in (4.16 m)
- Wingspan: 16 ft 0 in (4.87 m)
- Empty weight: 180 lb (80 kg)
- Gross weight: 400 lb (180 kg)

Performance

- Maximum speed: 65 mph (105 km/h, 56 kn)
- Maximum glide ratio: 6
