= Skyrider Stingray =

German ultralight trike

Stingray

General information
- Type: Ultralight trike
- National origin: Germany
- Manufacturer: Skyrider Flugschule
- Status: In production (2011)

History
- Introduction date: 2007

The Skyrider Stingray is a German ultralight trike, designed and produced by Skyrider Flugschule. The aircraft is supplied as a complete ready-to-fly-aircraft.

== Design and development ==
The Stingray was intended as a budget aircraft model and was introduced in 2007. It was designed to comply with the Fédération Aéronautique Internationale microlight category, including the category's maximum gross weight of 450 kg (992 lb). The aircraft has a maximum gross weight of 450 kg (992 lb). It features a strut-braced hang glider-style high-wing, weight-shift controls, a two-seats-in-tandem open cockpit, tricycle landing gear and a single engine in pusher configuration. A fibreglass cockpit fairing and wheel pants are optional.

The aircraft is made from square welded stainless steel tubing, with its double surface wing covered in Dacron sailcloth. Its 10.1 m (33.1 ft) span Bautek Pico wing is supported by struts and uses an "A" frame weight-shift control bar. The powerplant is a four stroke air and liquid-cooled, dual-ignition, 80 hp (60 kW) Rotax 912UL aircraft engine or optionally a twin cylinder, liquid-cooled, two-stroke, dual-ignition 64 hp (48 kW) Rotax 582 powerplant.

With the Rotax 912 engine the Stingray has an empty weight of 169 kg (373 lb) and a gross weight of 450 kg (992 lb), giving a useful load of 281 kg (619 lb). With full fuel of 65 litres (14 imp gal; 17 US gal) the payload is 234 kg (516 lb).

== Specifications (Stingray) ==
Data from Bayerl

General characteristics

- Crew: one
- Capacity: one passenger
- Wingspan: 10.1 m (33 ft 2 in)
- Wing area: 14.8 m^{2} (159 sq ft)
- Empty weight: 169 kg (373 lb)
- Gross weight: 450 kg (992 lb)
- Fuel capacity: 65 litres (14 imp gal; 17 US gal)
- Powerplant: 1 × Rotax 912UL four cylinder, liquid and air-cooled, four stroke aircraft engine, 60 kW (80 hp)
- Propellers: 3-bladed composite

Performance

- Maximum speed: 130 km/h (81 mph, 70 kn)
- Cruise speed: 110 km/h (68 mph, 59 kn)
- Stall speed: 65 km/h (40 mph, 35 kn)
- Rate of climb: 7.5 m/s (1,480 ft/min)
- Wing loading: 30.4 kg/m^{2} (6.2 lb/sq ft)
