= SkyDancer SD-260 =

American homebuilt aircraft

SD-260
- The SD-260 prototype under construction showing the structure

General information
- Type: Homebuilt aircraft
- National origin: United States
- Manufacturer: SkyDancer Aviation
- Status: Production completed
- Number built: At least two

The SkyDancer SD-260 was an American aerobatic homebuilt biplane that was designed and produced by SkyDancer Aviation of Louisville, Kentucky, introduced in the mid-1990s. When it was available the aircraft was supplied as a kit.

== Design and development ==
The SD-260 featured a strut-braced biplane layout, a two-seats-in-tandem open cockpit, with an optional bubble canopy, fixed conventional landing gear with wheel pants and a single engine in tractor configuration.

The aircraft fuselage was made from welded 4130 steel tubing. Its 22.00 ft (6.7 m) span had a wooden structure with four ailerons, a wing area of 135.0 sq ft (12.54 m^{2}) and was covered in doped aircraft fabric. The wing was supported by interplane struts, cabane struts and flying wires. The acceptable power range was 200 to 400 hp (149 to 298 kW) and the standard engine used was the 260 hp (194 kW) Lycoming IO-540 powerplant.

The SD-260 had a typical empty weight of 1,250 lb (570 kg) and a gross weight of 1,850 lb (840 kg), giving a useful load of 600 lb (270 kg). With full fuel of 29 U.S. gallons (110 L; 24 imp gal) the payload for the pilot, passenger and baggage was 426 lb (193 kg).

The standard day, sea level, no wind, take off with a 260 hp (194 kW) engine was 600 ft (183 m) and the landing roll was 800 ft (244 m).

The manufacturer estimated the construction time from the supplied kit as 1200 hours.

== Operational history ==
In March 2014 no examples were registered in the United States with the Federal Aviation Administration, although a total of two had been registered at one time. It is unlikely any remain in existence.

== Variants ==
SD-200 Basic
Proposed 200 hp (149 kW) model, not built
SD-200C Classic
Proposed 200 hp (149 kW) model, not built
SD-260
Base 260 hp (194 kW) model, two built
SD-300S
Proposed 300 hp (224 kW) single-seat model for advanced aerobatic maneuvers, not built

== Specifications (SD-260) ==
Data from AeroCrafter

General characteristics

- Crew: one
- Capacity: one passenger
- Length: 21 ft 0 in (6.40 m)
- Wingspan: 22 ft 0 in (6.71 m)
- Wing area: 135.0 sq ft (12.54 m^{2})
- Empty weight: 1,250 lb (567 kg)
- Gross weight: 1,850 lb (839 kg)
- Fuel capacity: 29 U.S. gallons (110 L; 24 imp gal)
- Powerplant: 1 × Lycoming IO-540 six cylinder, air-cooled, four stroke aircraft engine, 260 hp (190 kW)
- Propellers: 2-bladed metal constant speed propeller

Performance

- Maximum speed: 185 mph (298 km/h, 161 kn)
- Cruise speed: 160 mph (260 km/h, 140 kn)
- Stall speed: 56 mph (90 km/h, 49 kn)
- Range: 320 mi (510 km, 280 nmi)
- Service ceiling: 18,000 ft (5,500 m)
- Rate of climb: 2,200 ft/min (11 m/s)
- Wing loading: 13.7 lb/sq ft (67 kg/m^{2})

== See also ==
- List of aerobatic aircraft
