= Skyshark (cluster bomb) =

CASMU Skyshark
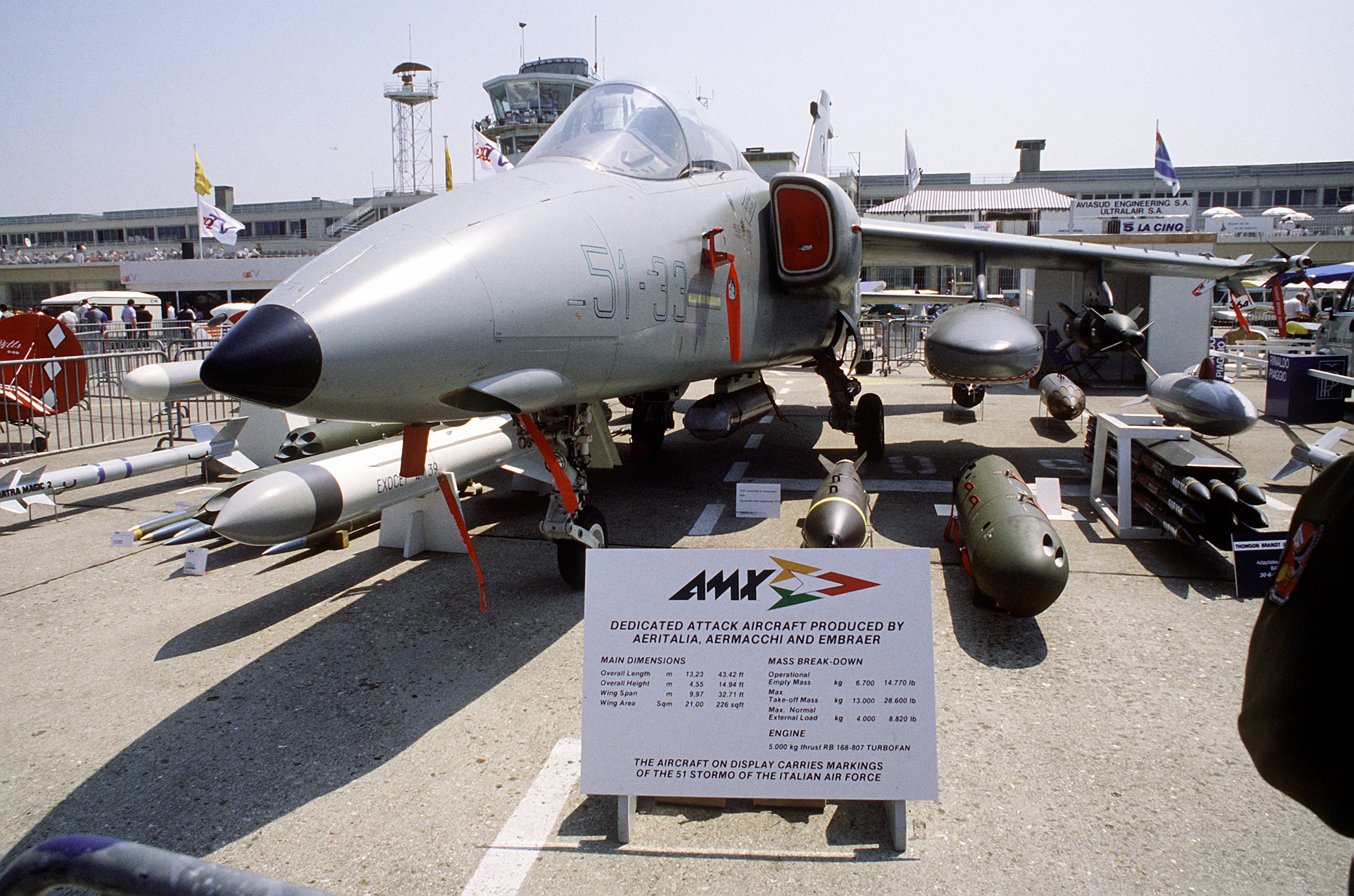
- A Skyshark can be seen on the right wing, closest pylon to the fuselage
- Type: cluster munition dispenser
- Place of origin: Italy

Production history
- Designed: 1987
- Manufacturer: CASMU Consortium
- No. built: at least 6

Specifications
- Mass: 1,000 kg (2,200 lb)
- Length: 4.75 m (15.6 ft)
- Effective firing range: 8–12 km (5.0–7.5 mi) unpowered 20–25 km (12–16 mi) with rocket)
- Payload capacity: 745 kg (1,642 lb)
- Maximum speed: mach 0.8
- Guidance system: inertial

The Skyshark was a canceled stand off guided cluster munition dispenser. created in a joint venture between Aeritalia and Snia-BPD known as CASMU. It was designed to be launched from the Panavia Tornado or AMX. Once released from the aircraft It would fly to a specified location and drop its submunitions using a lateral ejection system. The Skyshark has a length 4.75 m, wing span of 1.5 m, overall weight of 1000 kg. It was one of the earliest Italian designs to incorporate stealth aspects such as radar absorbent materials and a minimized radar cross section. It was developed as an evolution to the German MW-1 submunition delivery system which could be fired off instead of remaining an integral part of the airplane. Three variants of the Skyshark were designed; an unpowered glider variant, a rocket powered variant, and a turbojet powered variant. It had an un-powered glide range of between 6 and 12 km with a rocket powered option giving 20 to 25 km of range, turbojet powered version was exported. Flight tests for the weapon began in 1987. Skyshark development ended in 1993 when development funding was cut.
