= Kappa 77 KP 2U-SOVA =

Czech light aircraft

KP-2U Sova
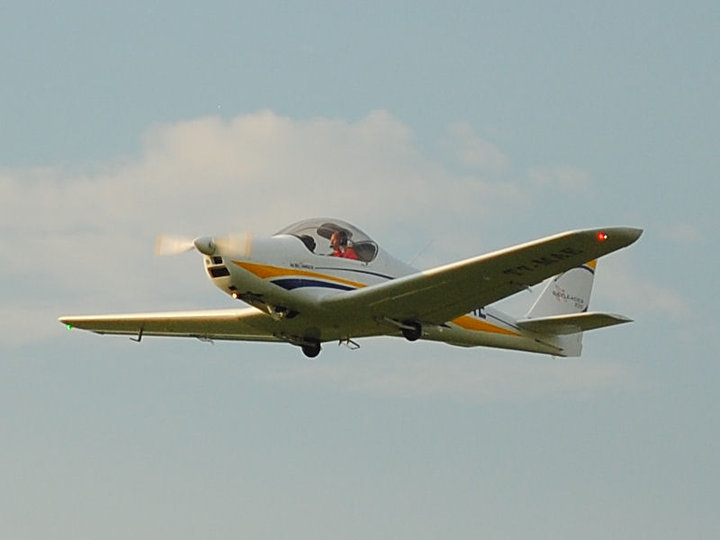
- KP-2U Skyleader 200

General information
- Type: Light aircraft
- National origin: Czech Republic
- Manufacturer: Kappa 77 a.s. Jihlavan Aircraft; Skyleader a.s. ACS
- Status: In production
- Number built: Over 210 by November 2010

History
- First flight: 26 May 1996

The Kappa 77 KP-2U Sova, later produced as the Jihlavan KP-2U Skyleader and most recently as the Jihlavan Skyleader, is a two-seat civil utility aircraft designed in the Czech Republic and available in kit form for home building. It is a conventional low-wing monoplane featuring all-metal construction and tricycle undercarriage.

== Design and development ==
Jihlavan Aircraft built the Kappa Sova for Kappa 77 from 1997 to 2004 and obtained marketing rights in 2005 when Kappa became insolvent. They became a subsidiary of Skyleader Aircraft in 2008 when the type was redesignated Jihlavan Skyleader. It is an all-metal design apart from a carbon fibre cockpit frame. It has two-spar tapered wings with 6° of dihedral, electrically operated Fowler flaps and upturned Küchemann tips. The fin and rudder are swept. The straight tapered tailplane is set on top of the fuselage, the port elevator carrying a trim tab.

The Bulgarian company ACS started producing the Skyleader 600 at the state owned TEREM-Letets aircraft factory in Sofia in July 2015 under a licence agreement.

The original Sova/Skyleader 150 has staggered side-by-side configuration seating with the starboard seat 200 mm (8 in) aft of the other, but a widened fuselage allows the Skyleader 200 to have true side-by-side seating. The earlier version has a forward-hinged canopy with fixed rear transparencies; the Skyleader 200 has a single-piece canopy. Both these variants normally have an electrically actuated tricycle undercarriage with a steerable nosewheel, though a fixed version is an option and is standard on the later Skyleader 500 and 600 variants. The standard engine for the 150/200 variants is a 60 kW (80 hp) Rotax 912UL, though the more powerful Rotax 912ULS or Rotax 914 can be fitted, all driving a choice of two-blade propellers. The 500/600 variants can also use the Rotax 912 UL or Rotax 912S; the Jabiru 2200 or 3300 engines may also be fitted. The Skyleader 500/600 variants have three-blade propellers.

The Kappa 77 KP-2U Sova first flew on 26 May 1996 and the KP-5 Rapid 500 (later the Skyleader 500) in December 2003. Czech certification was achieved in September 1997 and March 2004 respectively. The Skyleader is produced in both kit and flyaway form.

Airplanes Africa Limited a Czech manufacturer set up a plant in Tanzania to assemble the Skyleader 600. The Morogoro plant assembled Tanzania’s first aircraft in October 2023.

== Operational history ==
Over 210 had been sold by November 2010. 145 Sovas and 12 Skyleaders appear on the civil registers of European countries, Russia excepted, in mid-2010.

== Variants (Jihlavan) ==
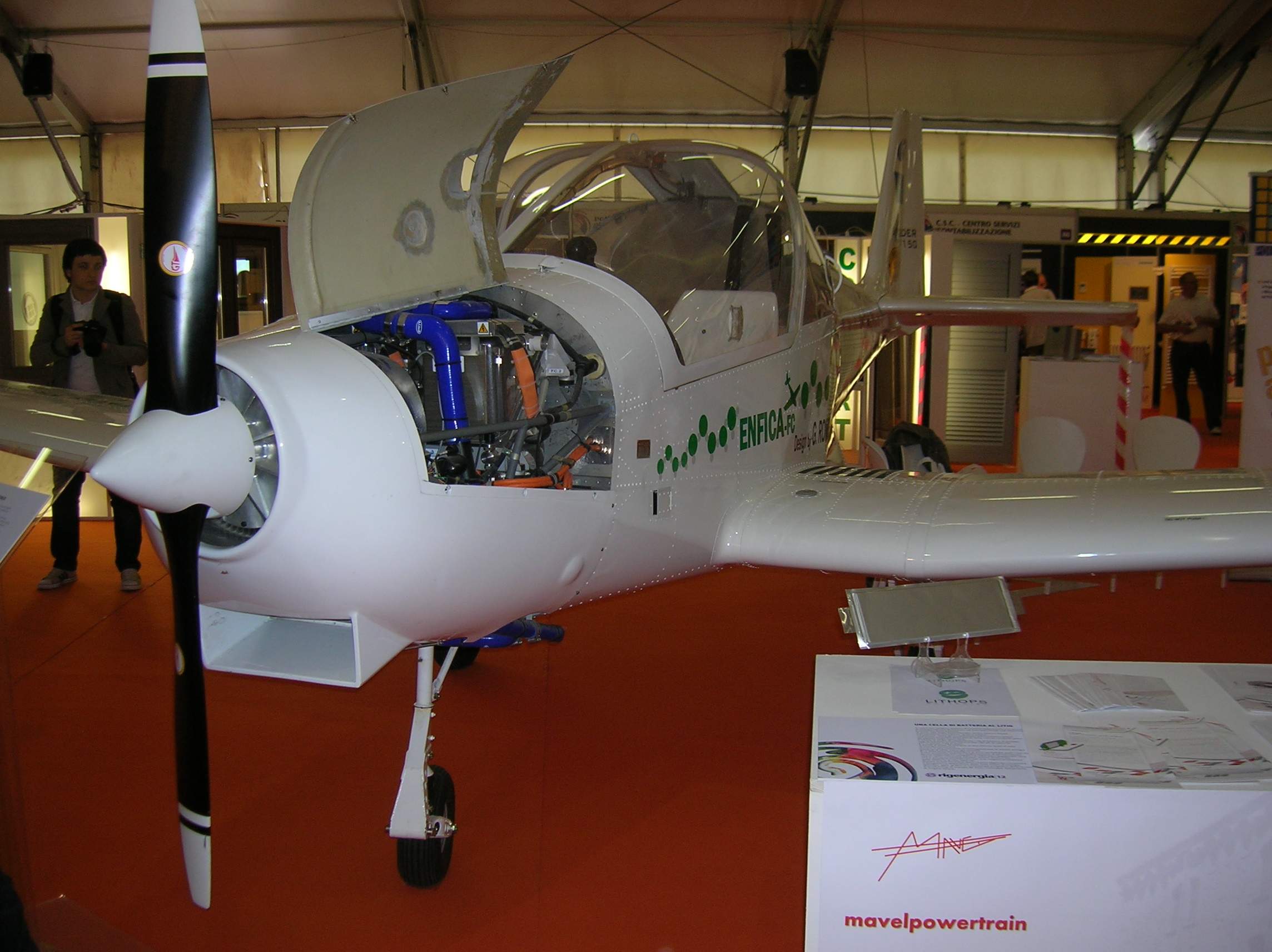
Rapid 200FC prototype hydrogen-powered aircraft via fuel cell

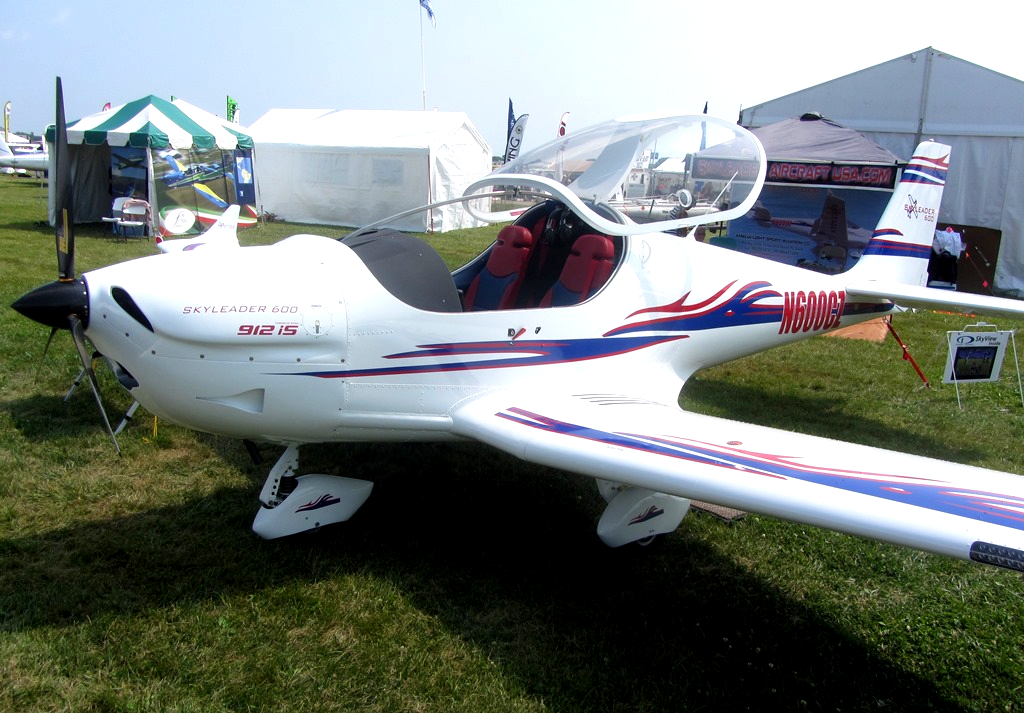
Skyleader 600

Data from Jane's All the World's Aircraft 2011/12

Skyleader 100
Single-seat variant, with optional rectangular or trapezoidal wing planform and powered by a 64 hp (48 kW) Rotax 582 two-stroke engine. Was expected to be marketed starting in 2011 as a kit or complete aircraft.
KP-2U Skyleader 150
Originally called the Kappa 77 KP-2U Sova. Staggered side-by-side seating.
KP-2 Skyleader 200
Introduced 1996, with widened cockpit to 120 cm (47 in) for more elbow room with side-by-side seating. It features retractable landing gear.
Rapid 200FC
One-off hydrogen-powered via fuel cell and electric motor Skyleader 150 conversion, first flight 20 May 2010.
KP-5 Skyleader 500
S-LSA version, originally the KP-5 Rapid 500. FAA approved July 2005.
Skyleader 400
Light-sport aircraft version with a gull-winged canopy and re-designed engine cowling, introduced as a "mid-line model". The 400 is also available a purely electric aircraft, powered by an 80 kW electric motor and 145 amp-hour battery pack.
Skyleader 600
Light sport model introduced at AERO Friedrichshafen in 2010. It features a wider 128 cm (50 in) cockpit, revised wingtips and greater fuel capacity. Engines available include the 80 hp (60 kW) Rotax 912UL, the 100 hp (75 kW) Rotax 912ULS and the turbocharged 115 hp (86 kW) Rotax 914 four-stroke powerplants.

== Accidents and incidents ==
In May 2016 a Skyleader 500 crashed in Rhoadesville, Virginia, United States, killing the two occupants of the aircraft. The Galaxy Rescue Systems ballistic parachute had been deployed, but the single front riser failed, leading to the parachute failure. The aircraft had been practicing slow flight and stalls and most likely entered a spin, from which the parachute was deployed. The aircraft was 50 lb (23 kg) over maximum weight at the time of the accident. The GRS parachute model had never been tested in the air on this aircraft design and had only been ground tested once. A new double front riser system is now in use.

== Specifications (KP-2U Sova) ==
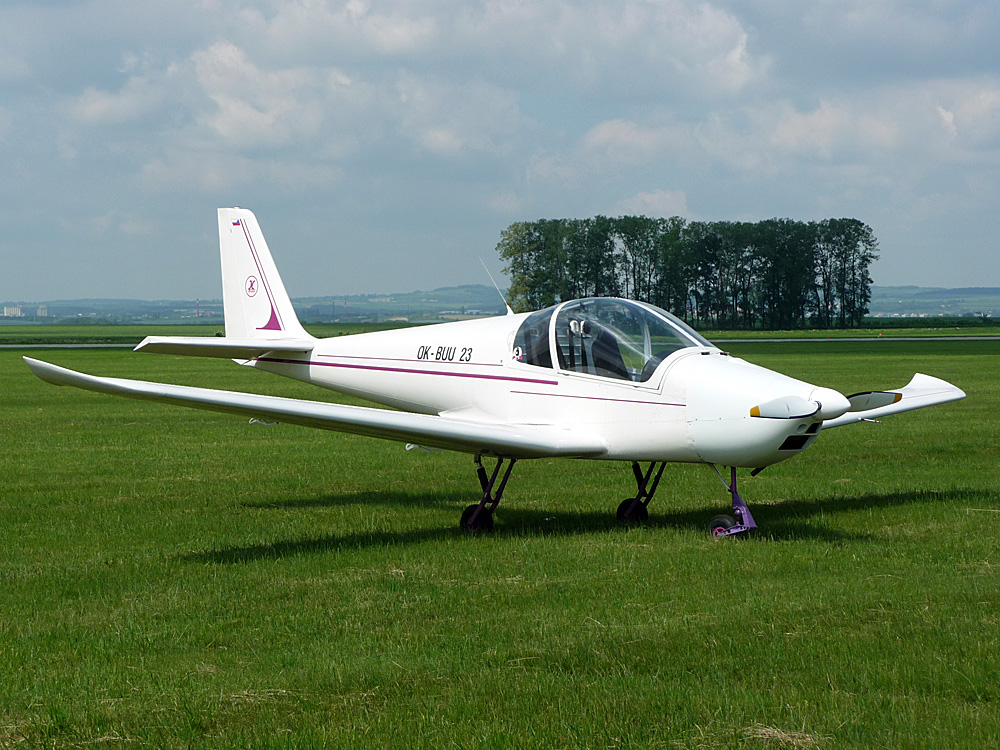
Kappa 77 KP-2U Sova

Data from Jane's All The World's Aircraft 2004–2005, Jane's All The World's Aircraft 2003–2004

General characteristics

- Crew: 1
- Capacity: 1 / 14 kg (31 lb) baggage shelf behind seats
- Length: 7.17 m (23 ft 6 in)
- Wingspan: 9.9 m (32 ft 6 in)
- Height: 2.6 m (8 ft 6 in)
- Wing area: 11.85 m^{2} (127.6 sq ft)
- Airfoil: root: NASA GA(W)-1; tip:N NASA GA(W)-2
- Empty weight: 285 kg (628 lb)
- Max takeoff weight: 450 kg (992 lb) (Czech Republic)

480 kg (1,058 lb) (Canada)
544 kg (1,199 lb) (Australia)

- Fuel capacity: 64 L (17 US gal; 14 imp gal)

94 L (25 US gal; 21 imp gal) (Australia)

- Powerplant: 1 × Rotax 912UL 4-cylinder air-cooled horizontally-opposed piston engine, 59.6 kW (79.9 hp)
- Propellers: 2 or 3-bladed variable-pitch propeller, 1.73 m (5 ft 8 in) diameter (or 3-bladed ground-adjustable propeller)

Performance

- Maximum speed: 240 km/h (150 mph, 130 kn)
- Cruise speed: 200 km/h (120 mph, 110 kn) at 75% power
- Stall speed: 71 km/h (44 mph, 38 kn) flaps up

48 km/h (30 mph; 26 kn) flaps down

- Range: 960 km (600 mi, 520 nmi)
- g limits: +4 -2
- Rate of climb: 6.5 m/s (1,280 ft/min)
- Take-off run: 100 m (328 ft)
- Landing run: 140 m (459 ft)
