= Skyline SL-222 =

SL-222

General information
- Type: Light utility and training helicopter
- Manufacturer: Skyline Construction Bureau

History
- First flight: c.16 February 2011

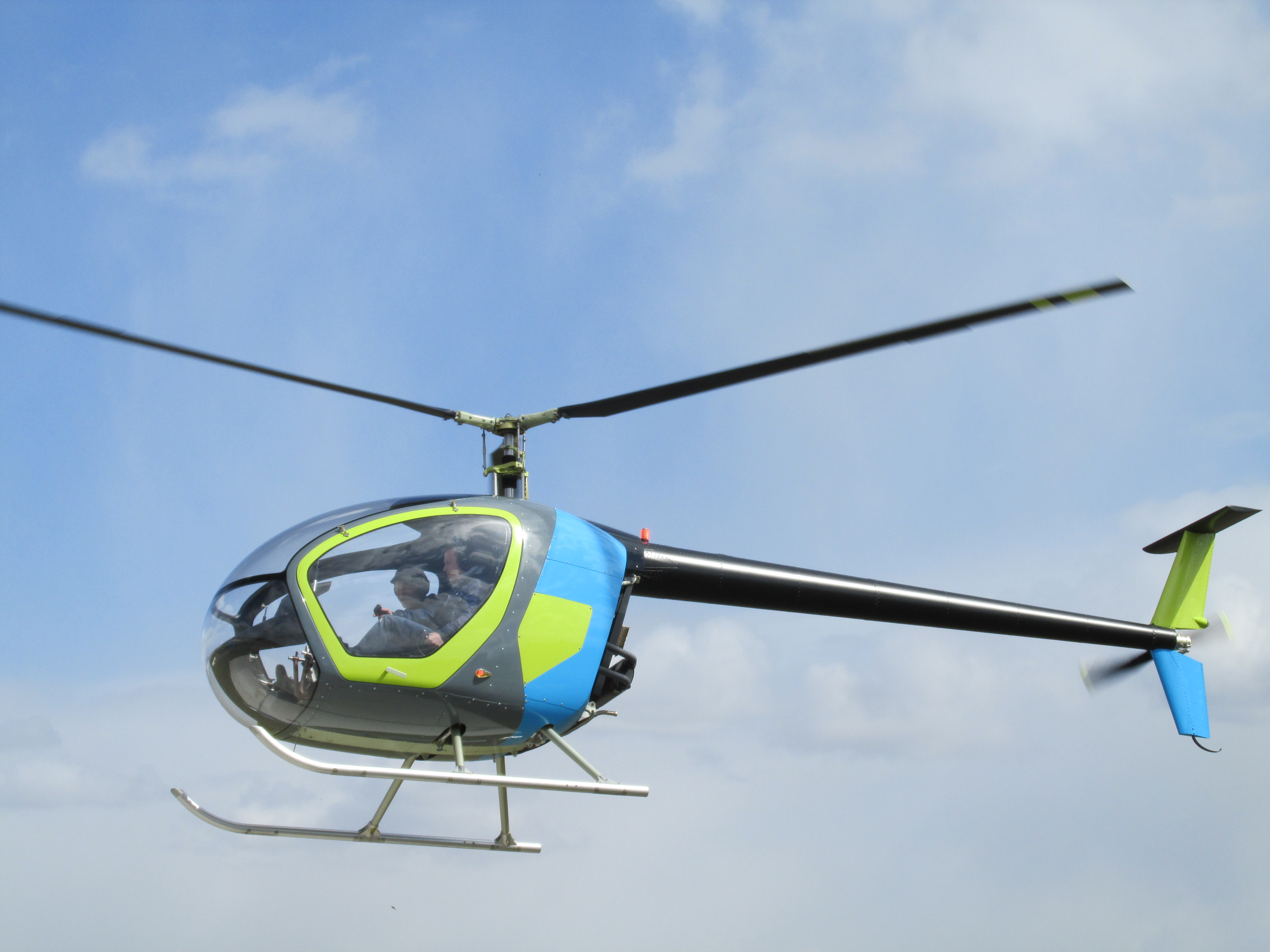
Skyline SL-231 in flight, Kyiv region, Ukraine (2015)

The Skyline SL-222 is a three-bladed, twin-engined light utility helicopter developed by the Ukrainian company Skyline. It made its first flight in 2011 and is intended to compete on the civil market in the same low-cost category as the popular Robinson R22.

== Design and development ==
The SL-222 is a pod and boom style helicopter, its twin 73.5 kW (99 hp) Hirth 3071 ES water cooled, fuel injected, three cylinder two stroke mounted at the rear of the pod and driving a three blade rotor. The tail rotor has two blades and there is a T-tail with a long underfin. The two occupants sit under streamlined glazing in side by side seats. Entry is by a pair of doors, one on each side. The SL-222 has a fixed skid undercarriage.

Structurally, the SL-222 is built around a pair of longitudinal Duralumin spars and a tube steel truss supporting the engines, drive train, fuel tanks, cabin floor and undercarriage. The cabin floor and tailboom are constructed from aluminium alloy. Carbon fibre sandwich materials are used elsewhere and rotors are also composites.

The SL-122 made its first circular flight on or before 16 February 2011.

== Specifications (SL-222) ==
Data from Jane's All the World's Aircraft 2013-14 p.655

General characteristics

- Crew: Two
- Empty weight: 377 kg (831 lb)
- Max takeoff weight: 637 kg (1,404 lb)
- Fuel capacity: 80 L (17.8 Imp gal; 21.1 US gal; 58 kg (127 lb)
- Powerplant: 2 × Hirth 3071 ES water cooled, fuel injected, three cylinder two stroke, 73.5 kW (98.6 hp) each

Performance

- Maximum speed: 194 km/h (121 mph, 105 kn)
- Cruise speed: 159 km/h (99 mph, 86 kn) normal
- Range: 550 km (340 mi, 300 nmi) at normal cruising speed
- Endurance: 3.50 h
- Service ceiling: 5,200 m (17,100 ft) service. Out of ground effect ceiling 2,095 m (6,880 ft)
- Rate of climb: 9.5 m/s (1,870 ft/min) at sea level
