= Skyline SL-122 Bdzhilka =

SL-122 Bdzhilka

General information
- Type: Agricultural aircraft
- National origin: Ukraine
- Manufacturer: Skyline
- Designer: Viktor Vashchenko
- Number built: 1 by 2012

History
- First flight: May 2010

The Skyline SL-122 Bdzhilka (Ukrainian: Бджілка, bee) is a twin engine agricultural spray aircraft designed and built in Ukraine and first flown in 2010.

== Design and development ==
The SL-122 is designed for crop spraying. It is a high-wing monoplane with an unswept, constant chord wing with square wing tips braced with a single strut to the lower fuselage on each side. The wing has flaps and automatic slats for low speed flight. Two 73.5 kW (98.6 hp) Rotax 912 ULS2 liquid cooled flat four engines are mounted over and ahead of the wing leading edge, as close together as the disks of the three blade propellers allow.

The fuselage of the SL-122 is flat sided and deep. There are two tandem seats in the underwing cabin, which is fully glazed all around. Its rectangular tailplane is mounted on top of the fuselage, below a straight tapered fin and rudder. The Pchelka has a fixed, conventional undercarriage; V-struts hinged to the lower fuselage support the mainwheels at the outer ends of bungee cord sprung half axles from the fuselage underside. There is a cantilever, steerable tailwheel.

The SL-122 has a 250 L (55 Imp gal; 66 US gal) tank for agricultural spray liquid and can treat 200 ha (494 acres) per hour in 37 m (121 ft) swathes.

It first flew in May 2010 and made its public debut a month later in Zhytomyr.

== Operational history ==
No sales were reported by 2012, though the prototype had been put on the market.

== Variants ==
SL-122
Agricultural aircraft.
SL-124
Projected four seat transport, unflown late 2012.
SL-125
Projected amphibious variant, unflown late 2012.

== Specifications (SL-122) ==
Data from Jane's All the World's Aircraft 2013-14, pp.655

General characteristics

- Crew: Two
- Length: 7.22 m (23 ft 8 in)
- Wingspan: 11.76 m (38 ft 7 in)
- Height: 3.07 m (10 ft 1 in)
- Wing area: 16.46 m^{2} (177.2 sq ft)
- Empty weight: 540 kg (1,190 lb)
- Max takeoff weight: 950 kg (2,094 lb)
- Fuel capacity: 120 L (26.4 Imp gal; 31.7 US gal); 86 kg (189 lb)
- Powerplant: 2 × Rotax 912 ULS2 liquid cooled flat four, 73.5 kW (98.6 hp) each
- Propellers: 3-bladed

Performance

- Maximum speed: 230 km/h (140 mph, 120 kn)
- Cruise speed: 159 km/h (99 mph, 86 kn) maximum operating speed
- Stall speed: 67 km/h (42 mph, 36 kn)
- Range: 900 km (560 mi, 490 nmi)
- g limits: +4.5/-2.5
- Rate of climb: 11.0 m/s (2,170 ft/min)
- Wing loading: 57.7 kg/m^{2} (11.8 lb/sq ft) maximum
- Power/mass: 155 W/kg (0.094 hp/lb)
- Take-off run: 100 m (329 ft)
- Landing run: 80 m (263 ft)
