= Freestyle (graphic novel) =

2022 graphic novel

- Author: Gale Galligan
- Illustrator: Gale Galligan and K Czap
- Publisher: Graphix
- Publication date: October 18, 2022
- ISBN: 978-1-338-04580-2

Freestyle is a 2022 graphic novel written by Gale Galligan and illustrated by Galligan and K Czap. It follows a teen dancer who befriends his tutor after learning about her talents with a yo-yo. It was their first original graphic novel after gaining notice for their work on The Baby-Sitters Club graphic adaptations.

== Plot ==
Cory Tan is a member of the Eight Bitz dance crew, a group of consisting of himself and fellow eighth graders Tess, Dia, Henry, Sho, Ahsa, Hannah, and Glenn. As they prepare for the upcoming Bronx Kids Battle dance tournament, Cory finds himself in conflict with the crew's captain Tess, whose strict choreography clashes with his desire to freestyle. Additionally, when Cory's grades start suffering, his parent set him up with a tutor, Sunna Ahmad, who after a chilly first meeting impresses him with her yo-yoing abilities. As Cory and Sunna hang together more and more, Cory struggles with balancing their friendship with his commitments to Eight Bitz.

== Reception ==
Freestyle received starred reviews from Kirkus Reviews, Publishers Weekly, and School Library Journal. Kirkus Reviews stated "this inviting, heartfelt story will get readers into the groove of self-expression and lasting friendships."

It was also reviewed by Booklist.
