= Skyleader GP One =

Czech ultralight aircraft

GP One
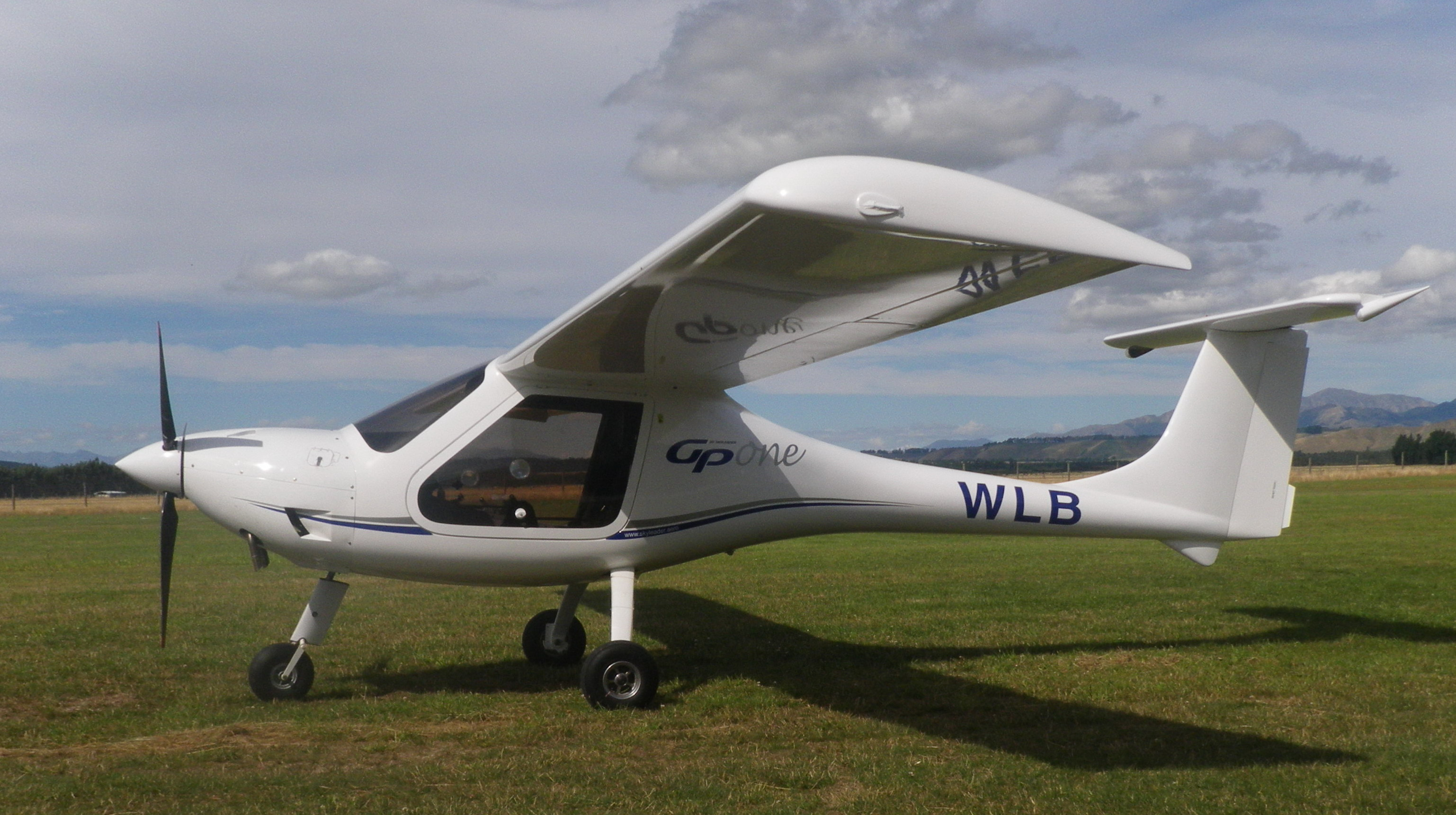

General information
- Type: Ultralight aircraft
- National origin: Czech Republic
- Manufacturer: Skyleader Aircraft
- Status: In production (2011)

History
- Introduction date: 2010

The Skyleader GP One is a Czech ultralight aircraft, designed and produced by Skyleader Aircraft and introduced at the AERO Friedrichshafen show in 2010. The aircraft is supplied as a complete ready-to-fly-aircraft.

== Design and development ==
The GP One was designed to comply with the Fédération Aéronautique Internationale microlight rules. It features a cantilever high-wing, a two-seats-in-side-by-side configuration enclosed cockpit accessed by doors, fixed tricycle landing gear and a single engine in tractor configuration.

The aircraft is made from carbon fibre and has a predicted empty weight of 280 kg (617 lb). Its 10.2 m (33.5 ft) span wing has an area of 11.165 m^{2} (120.18 sq ft) and mounts flaps. The standard engine available is the 80 hp (60 kW) Rotax 912UL four-stroke powerplant.

Production started in 2011, with the first customer deliveries in 2012.

== Specifications (GP One) ==
Data from Bayerl and Skyleader

General characteristics

- Crew: one
- Capacity: one passenger
- Length: 6.25 m (20 ft 6 in)
- Wingspan: 10.2 m (33 ft 6 in)
- Height: 2.1 m (6 ft 11 in)
- Wing area: 11.165 m^{2} (120.18 sq ft)
- Aspect ratio: 9.32:1
- Empty weight: 280 kg (617 lb)
- Gross weight: 472.5 kg (1,042 lb)
- Fuel capacity: 105 litres (23 imp gal; 28 US gal)
- Powerplant: 1 × Rotax 912UL four cylinder, liquid and air-cooled, four stroke aircraft engine, 60 kW (80 hp)
- Propellers: 3-bladed ground adjustable, composite

Performance

- Maximum speed: 215 km/h (134 mph, 116 kn)
- Cruise speed: 193 km/h (120 mph, 104 kn)
- Stall speed: 64 km/h (40 mph, 35 kn)
- Never exceed speed: 260 km/h (160 mph, 140 kn)
- Range: 1,370 km (850 mi, 740 nmi)
- Endurance: 6.1 hours plus 0.5 hour reserve
- Wing loading: 42.3 kg/m^{2} (8.7 lb/sq ft)
