= Aero-Service Panda =

Polish ultralight aircraft

Panda
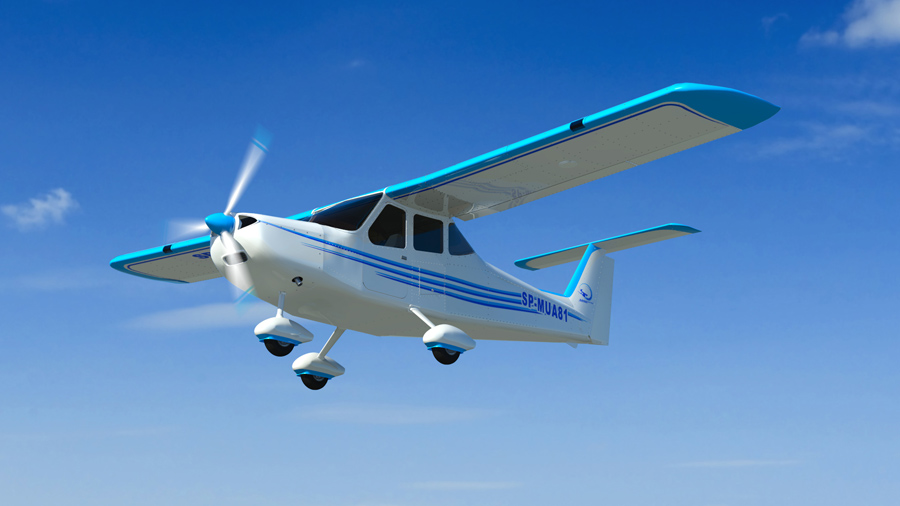
- Artist's rendering of the Panda

General information
- Type: Ultralight aircraft
- National origin: Poland
- Manufacturer: Aero-Service Jacek Skopiński
- Status: In production (2016)

History
- First flight: 28 September 2016

The Aero-Service Panda is a Polish ultralight, designed and produced by Aero-Service Jacek Skopiński of Warsaw. The aircraft is supplied complete and ready-to-fly.

== Design and development ==
The Panda was designed to comply with the Fédération Aéronautique Internationale microlight rules. It features a cantilever high-wing, a T-tail, a two-seats-in-side-by-side configuration enclosed cabin, fixed tricycle landing gear and a single engine in tractor configuration.

The aircraft is made from sheet aluminum, with some parts, such as the engine cowling and wing tips made from composites. Its 8.91 m (29.2 ft) span wing employs a modified NACA 633-618 airfoil, has an area of 10.6 m^{2} (114 sq ft) and flaps. The cabin width is 120 cm (47 in).

The Panda prototype was first flown on 28 September 2011.

== Operational history ==
Reviewer Marino Boric described the design in a 2015 review as possessing visibility that "is good in all directions because of very large glassed surfaces". He also noted that it is "sold at a reasonable price".

== Variants ==
Panda Standard
Base model powered by an 80 hp (60 kW) Rotax 912UL four-stroke powerplant.
Panda Sport
Model powered by a 100 hp (75 kW) Rotax 912ULS four-stroke powerplant.
Panda Exclusive
Model powered by a 100 hp (75 kW) Rotax 912ULS four-stroke powerplant plus with a Dynon glass cockpit and other options as standard.

== Specifications (Panda Standard) ==
Data from Tacke and manufacturer

General characteristics

- Crew: one
- Capacity: one passenger
- Length: 6.62 m (21 ft 9 in)
- Wingspan: 8.91 m (29 ft 3 in)
- Height: 2.32 m (7 ft 7 in)
- Wing area: 10.6 m^{2} (114 sq ft)
- Airfoil: modified NACA 633-618
- Empty weight: 270 kg (595 lb)
- Gross weight: 472.5 kg (1,042 lb)
- Fuel capacity: 100 litres (22 imp gal; 26 US gal)
- Powerplant: 1 × Rotax 912UL four cylinder, liquid and air-cooled, four stroke aircraft engine, 60 kW (80 hp)
- Propellers: 3-bladed composite

Performance

- Maximum speed: 220 km/h (140 mph, 120 kn)
- Cruise speed: 190 km/h (120 mph, 100 kn)
- Stall speed: 62 km/h (39 mph, 33 kn) flaps down
- Never exceed speed: 260 km/h (160 mph, 140 kn)
- Range: 1,200 km (750 mi, 650 nmi) with 45 minutes reserves
- Service ceiling: 3,650 m (11,980 ft)
- g limits: +4/-2
- Rate of climb: 6 m/s (1,200 ft/min)
- Wing loading: 44.57 kg/m^{2} (9.13 lb/sq ft)

== See also ==
- Aero-Service Puma
