= Aero-Service Puma =

Polish ultralight aircraft

Puma
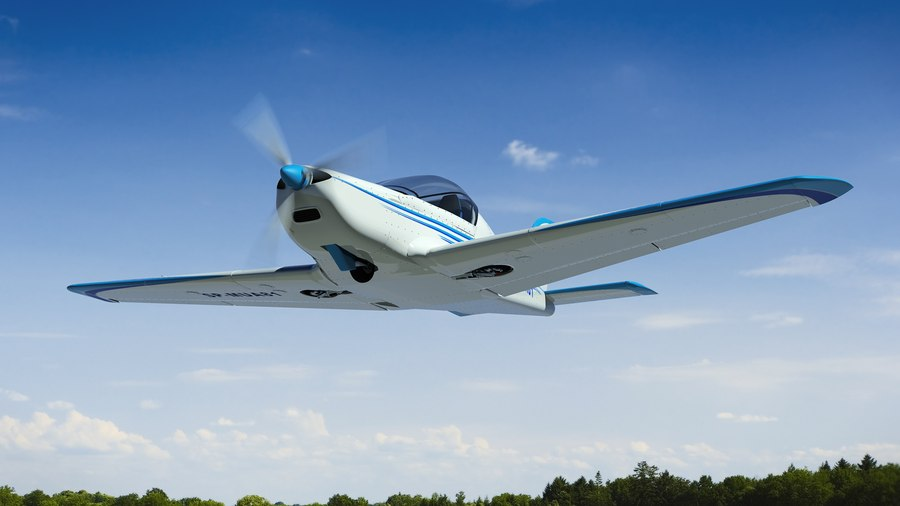
- Artist's rendering of the Puma

General information
- Type: Ultralight aircraft
- National origin: Poland
- Manufacturer: Aero-Service Jacek Skopiński
- Status: Under development (2016)

History
- First flight: pending

The Aero-Service Puma is a Polish ultralight aircraft, designed and produced by Aero-Service Jacek Skopiński of Warsaw. The aircraft is supplied complete and ready-to-fly.

== Design and development ==
The Puma was designed to comply with the Fédération Aéronautique Internationale microlight rules. It features a cantilever low-wing, a two-seats-in-side-by-side configuration enclosed cockpit under a bubble canopy, retractable tricycle landing gear and a single engine in tractor configuration.

The aircraft fuselage is made from welded steel tubing, with an aluminum sheet wing. Its 9.15 m (30.0 ft) span wing employs a NACA 4415 airfoil at the wing root, transitioning to a NACA 4412 at the wing tip. The wing has an area of 11.3 m^{2} (122 sq ft) and mounts flaps. Standard engines available are the 80 hp (60 kW) Rotax 912UL, the 100 hp (75 kW) Rotax 912ULS and the 115 hp (86 kW) Rotax 914 four-stroke powerplants. The cabin width is 124 cm (49 in).

The Puma was designed in 2008, with a prototype under construction in September 2011. No first flight of the design has been confirmed.

A fixed gear version, to be called the Raptor, was under preliminary development in 2010.

== Specifications (Puma) ==
Data from Tacke and manufacturer

General characteristics

- Crew: one
- Capacity: one passenger
- Length: 6.27 m (20 ft 7 in)
- Wingspan: 9.15 m (30 ft 0 in)
- Height: 2.30 m (7 ft 7 in)
- Wing area: 11.3 m^{2} (122 sq ft)
- Airfoil: Root: NACA 4415, tip: NACA 4412
- Empty weight: 290 kg (639 lb)
- Gross weight: 472.5 kg (1,042 lb)
- Fuel capacity: 100 litres (22 imp gal; 26 US gal)
- Powerplant: 1 × Rotax 912UL four cylinder, liquid and air-cooled, four stroke aircraft engine, 60 kW (80 hp)
- Propellers: 3-bladed composite

Performance

- Maximum speed: 240 km/h (150 mph, 130 kn)
- Cruise speed: 220 km/h (140 mph, 120 kn)
- Stall speed: 61 km/h (38 mph, 33 kn) flaps down
- Never exceed speed: 270 km/h (170 mph, 150 kn)
- Range: 1,200 km (750 mi, 650 nmi) with 45 minute reserve
- Service ceiling: 3,650 m (11,980 ft)
- g limits: +4/-2
- Rate of climb: 8 m/s (1,600 ft/min)
- Wing loading: 51.63 kg/m^{2} (10.57 lb/sq ft)

== See also ==
- Aero-Service Panda
