= Aero-Service Jacek Skopiński =

Polish aircraft manufacturer

Aero-Service
- Company type: Privately held company
- Industry: Aerospace
- Founded: 1999
- Founder: Jacek Skopiński
- Headquarters: Warsaw, Poland
- Products: Ultralight aircraft, electric vehicles, boats
- Services: numerical controlled machining
- Website: www.aero-service.com

Aero-Service Jacek Skopiński is a Polish aircraft manufacturer based in Warsaw, founded by Jacek Skopiński in 1999. The company specializes in the design and manufacture of ultralight aircraft in the form of ready-to-fly aircraft. The company also produces electric vehicles, boats and carries out numerical controlled machining.

Among its electric vehicle line the company produces fully tracked, electric-powered off-road roller skates.

The company has been noted for its EV4, an articulated wheel, electric quadricycle that was designed by Skopiński for urban use.

The company has constructed two aircraft designs. The Panda is a two-seat, cantilever high-wing monoplane with fixed tricycle landing gear, while the Puma is a two-seat, low-wing monoplane with retractable landing gear.

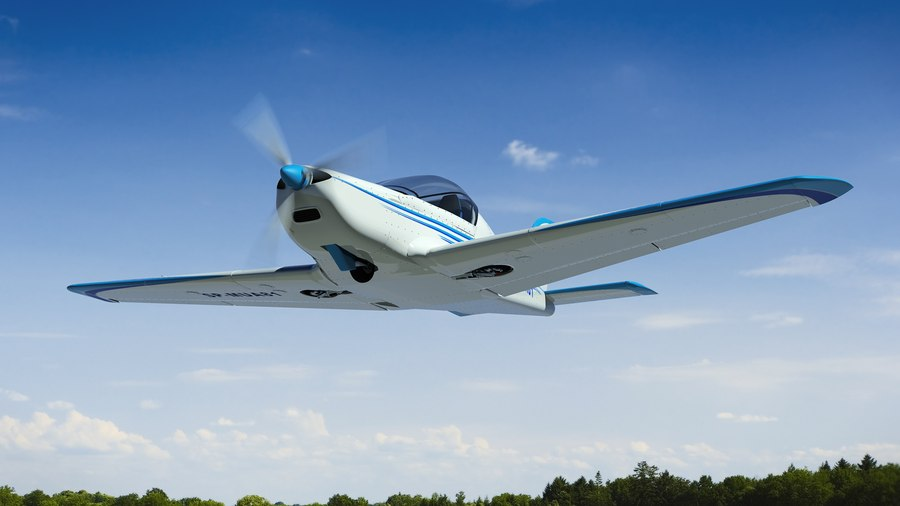
Artist's rendering of the Aero-Service Puma

The Panda commenced flight testing with a first flight on 28 September 2011. The prototype Puma was also under construction in September 2011, having been designed in 2008. There is no indication that the Puma prototype has yet flown. A fixed gear version of the Puma, named the Raptor, entered the preliminary design phase in 2010.

== Aircraft ==
Summary of aircraft built by Aero-Service Jacek Skopiński:

- Aero-Service Panda
- Aero-Service Puma
