= Reflex Paramoteur =

French aircraft manufacturer

- Type: Privately held company
- Industry: Aerospace
- Founded: before 2001
- Founder: Dominique Cholou & Ronan Cholou
- Defunct: circa 2010
- Headquarters: Chatou, France
- Products: Paramotors

Reflex Paramoteur (English: Paramotor) was a French aircraft manufacturer founded by Dominique Cholou and his son Ronan Cholou and based in Chatou. The company specialized in the design and manufacture of paramotors in the form of ready-to-fly aircraft for the US FAR 103 Ultralight Vehicles rules and the European Fédération Aéronautique Internationale microlight category.

The company seems to have been founded before 2001 and gone out of business in about 2010.

The company produced a range of paramotors, including the mid-2000s Reflex Bi Trike, J 160, J 320, Model S, Solo Elec and the later Classic, Dynamic and Reflex Top Box.

== Aircraft ==
Summary of aircraft built by Reflex Paramoteur
Model name	First flight	Number built	Type
Reflex Bi Trike	mid-2000s		paramotor
Reflex J 160	mid-2000s		paramotor
Reflex J 320	mid-2000s		paramotor
Reflex S	mid-2000s		paramotor
Reflex Solo Elec	mid-2000s		paramotor
Reflex Classic	2010s		paramotor
Reflex Dynamic	2010s		paramotor
Reflex Top Box	2010s		paramotor
