= Freestyle (software) =

- Developer(s): Emmanuel Turquin, Stéphane Grabli
- Stable release: 2.2.0 / March 5, 2008; 17 years ago
- Written in: C++
- Operating system: Linux, Mac OS X, Microsoft Windows
- Type: Renderer
- License: GNU General Public License
- Website: https://freestyle.sourceforge.net/

Freestyle is a free, open source renderer for non-photorealistic line drawing from 3D scenes.

== Model ==
The program uses a shader script model inspired by the RenderMan Shading Language, allowing different shading styles to be written as a script that's interpreted at the render time. The different rendering styles are based on "style modules" that are written in Python programming language.

The stand-alone program, which uses OpenGL and the Qt widget toolkit, can render images based on .3ds files. The stand-alone version of Freestyle is not under active development anymore, since 2008.

Freestyle is integrated with Blender as of version 2.67. The Freestyle version integrated with Blender is under active development.

== See also ==
- Aqsis
- Pixie (renderer)
