= Skif Paragliding =

- Company type: Privately held company
- Industry: Aerospace
- Founded: 1993
- Headquarters: Feodosia, Ukraine
- Products: Paragliders
- Owner: Sergei Rozhko
- Website: www.paraskif.com

Skif Paragliding is a Ukrainian aircraft manufacturer founded by Sergei Rozhko in 1993 and based in Feodosia. The company specializes in the design and manufacture of paragliders in the form of ready-to-fly aircraft, and also runs a paragliding flight training school.

Rozhko is also the designer of the company's paraglider line.

The company flight training operation takes place on Klementyeva Mountain.

By 2003, the company was offering a line of paragliders, including the beginner to intermediate Skif-A, the competition Raptor and the two-place BigSkif Bi for flight training.

== Aircraft ==
Summary of aircraft built by Skif Paragliding:

- Skif BigSkif Bi
- Skif Phaeton
- Skif Raptor
- Skif Sarmat
- Skif Skif-A
