= Skywalk GmbH & Co. KG =

German aircraft manufacturer

- Company type: Kommanditgesellschaft
- Industry: Aerospace
- Founded: 2001
- Headquarters: Marquartstein, Germany
- Key people: Manfred Kistler, Thomas Allertseder
- Products: Paragliders
- Website: www.skywalk.org

Skywalk GmbH & Co. KG is a German aircraft manufacturer based in Marquartstein, Bavaria. Founded by Manfred Kistler and Thomas Allertseder in 2001, the company specializes in the design and manufacture of paragliders in the form of ready-to-fly aircraft as well as paragliding harnesses. The company also makes kite surfing wings and promotional tents.

Manfred Kistler formerly worked for Swing Flugsportgeräte and Thomas Allerseder was a director of Betech.

The company is organized as a Gesellschaft mit beschränkter Haftung and Co. kommanditgesellschaft limited partnership.

== History ==
The company's first glider was the Hype, an intermediate paraglider certified to DHV 1-2 standards. In 2003 the DHV 2 certified Cayenne was added to the line. By 2016 the company offered a full line of "classic" gliders as well as lightweight designs, mountain descent miniwings and a tandem design, the Join't for flight training.

== Divisions ==
Flysurfer Kiteboarding
Kite surfing kites & boards
Skywalk Paragliders
Paragliders and harnesses
X-Gloo Creative Event Equipment
Promotional tents and trade show display equipment

== Aircraft ==
Summary of aircraft built by Skywalk:

- Skywalk Arriba
- Skywalk Cayenne
- Skywalk Chili
- Skywalk Hype
- Skywalk Join't
- Skywalk Masala
- Skywalk Mescal
- Skywalk Poison
- Skywalk Spice
- Skywalk Tequila
- Skywalk Tonic
- Skywalk Tonka
- Skywalk X-Alps
