= Sky Science =

British aircraft manufacturer

Sky Science Powered Parachutes Limited
- Company type: Privately held company
- Industry: Aerospace
- Founded: circa 2000
- Defunct: circa 2003
- Headquarters: Tidworth, United Kingdom
- Products: Kit aircraft
- Services: Parachuting, aircraft leasing and rental

Sky Science Powered Parachutes Limited was a British aircraft manufacturer and parachute training and service provider, based in Tidworth, Wiltshire. The company specialized in the design and manufacture of powered parachutes in the form of kits for amateur construction in the European Fédération Aéronautique Internationale microlight and homebuilt categories.

The company seems to have been founded about 2000 and gone out of business in late 2003.

The company provided a range of services including parachuting, training, sales and rigging, rentals of Russian aircraft and a parachute display team. The company also offered a single design of powered parachute, the Sky Science PowerHawk. The prototype was registered in 2000, but removed from the register by the British Civil Aviation Authority in 2005, without any indication of further sales of the type.

== Aircraft ==
Summary of aircraft built by Sky Science
Model name	First flight	Number built	Type
Sky Science PowerHawk	2000	At least one	Two-seat powered parachute
