= Skyjam ST-Freestyle =

ST-Freestyle

General information
- Type: Ultralight trike, powered parachute and powered paraglider
- National origin: Switzerland
- Manufacturer: Skyjam Paragliders
- Status: Production completed

The Skyjam ST-Freestyle is a Swiss electric aircraft that can be flown as an ultralight trike, powered parachute and powered paraglider. It was designed and produced by Skyjam Paragliders of Einsiedeln, but the company appears to be out of business as of 2013 and production is assumed to be complete. When it was available the aircraft was supplied as a complete ready-to-fly-aircraft.

== Design and development ==
The aircraft is made from bolted-together aluminum tubing. In its ultralight trike configuration the ST-Freestyle features a cable-braced hang glider-style high-wing covered in Dacron sailcloth, supported by a single tube-type kingpost with weight-shift controls utilizing an "A" frame weight-shift control bar. The trike wing can be removed and a powered parachute wing substituted in a few minutes. In that configuration the wing is controlled by conventional paraglider brakes for steering. The engine package can also be removed from the wheeled fuselage frame and the aircraft then foot-launched as a powered paraglider using the same wing.

Pilot accommodation is a single-seat open cockpit without a cockpit fairing. The ST-Freestyle has tricycle landing gear and a single electric motor in pusher configuration. The powerplant is a ST Elektro ST100 or ST200 electric motor driving a shrouded three-bladed composite propeller.

== Specifications (ST-Freestyle) ==
Data from Bayerl

General characteristics

- Crew: one
- Powerplant: 1 × ST Elektro ST100 or ST Elektro ST200 electric motor
- Propellers: 3-bladed composite
