= Skyleader =

Czech aircraft manufacturer

Skyleader a.s.
- Company type: Private joint stock company
- Industry: Aerospace
- Headquarters: Jihlava, Czech Republic
- Products: Microlight aircraft Aerospace manufacturing subcontracting
- Owner: Private Owner
- Website: www.skyleader.aero

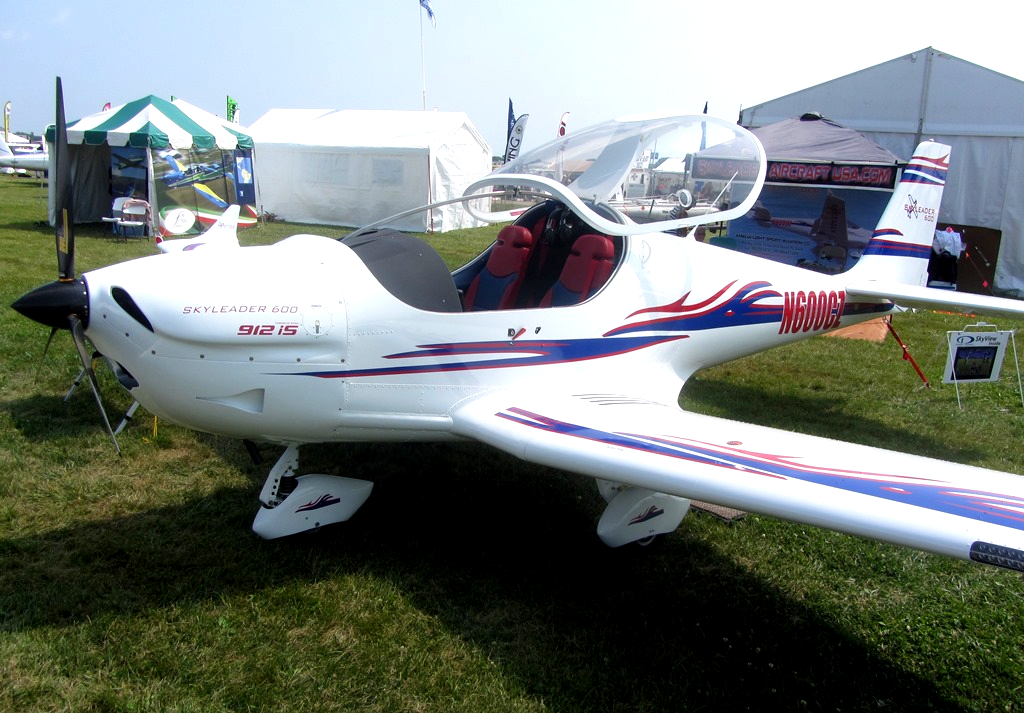
Skyleader 600

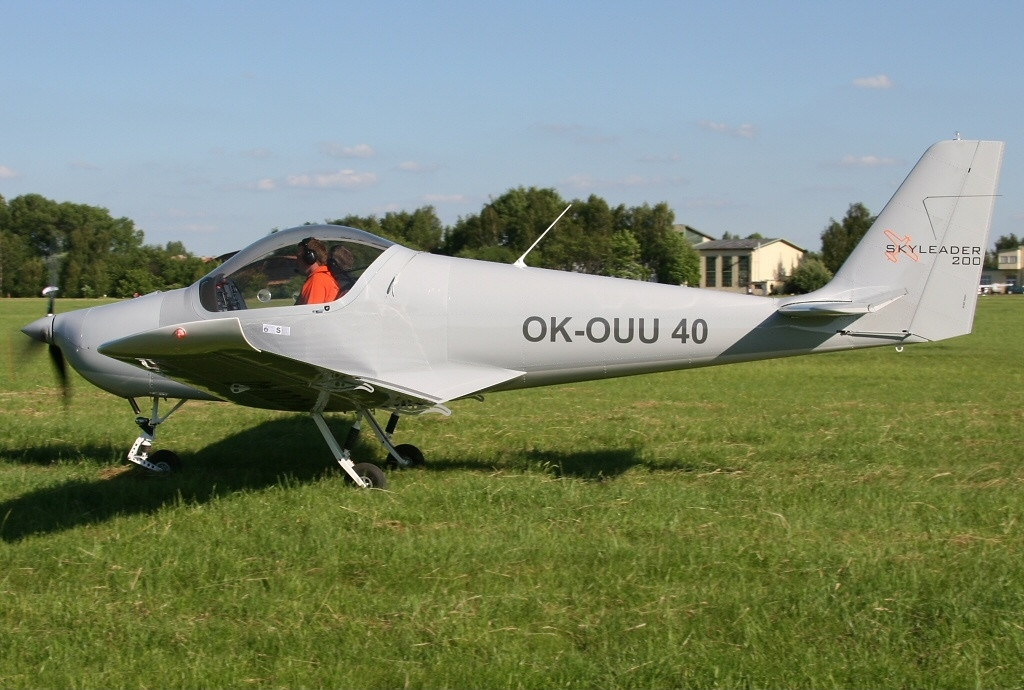
Skyleader 200 UL

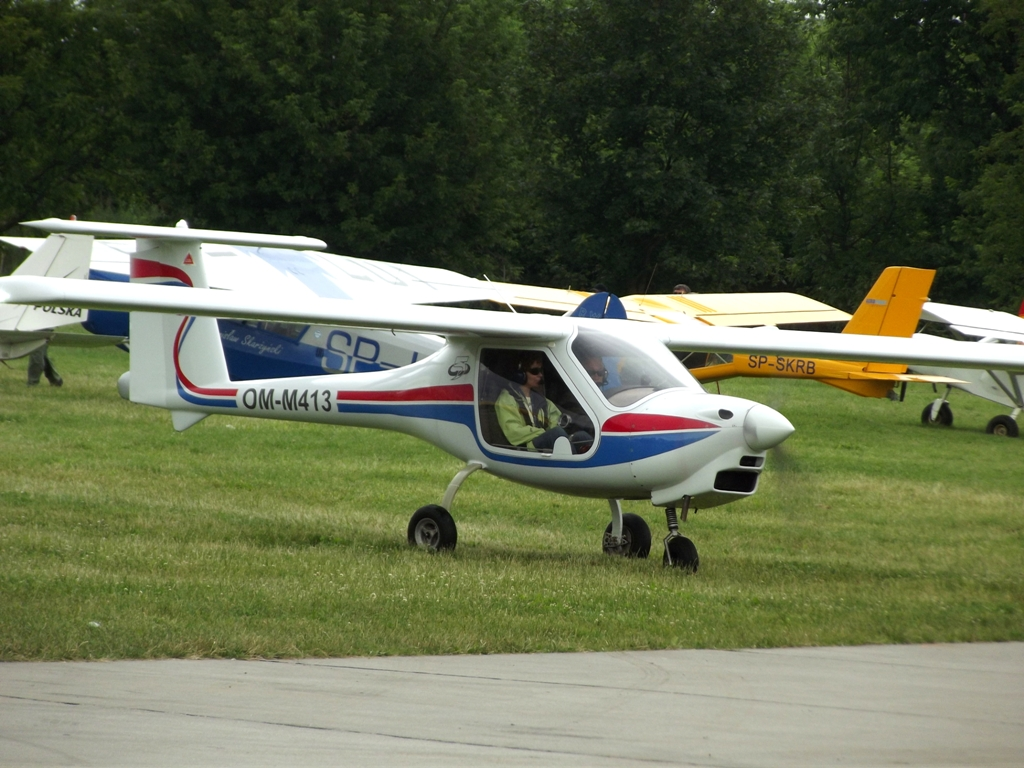
Skyleader GP One

Skyleader a.s. is a Czech aircraft manufacturer based in Jihlava, Czech Republic. The company specializes in the design and manufacture of ultralight aircraft up to 600kg MTOM (1320lb MTOW) in the form of ready-to-fly aircraft or FBK (Fast Built Kit) in the Letecká amatérská asociace České republiky (LAA ČR) ultralight, Deutscher Ultraleichtflugverband (DULV) ultralight, Dachverband deutscher Luftsportverbände (DAeC) ultralight, Fédération française d'ULM (FFPLUM) ultralight, British Microlight Aircraft Association (BMAA) microlight, and American light-sport aircraft categories.

== History ==
The company was formed as a successor to the bankrupt Kappa 77, s.r.o., in March 2005 as Jihlavan Airplanes, s.r.o., named for the town in which it is located. Skyleader owns 100% of Jihlavan Airplanes and operates it as a subsidiary.

The company works with the Institute of Aerospace Engineering at Brno University of Technology on aircraft design, having jointly developed the Kappa 77 KP 2U-SOVA into the Skyleader 100 to 600 series of microlight and light-sport aircraft. The Skyleader GP One was developed as a new high-wing design and introduced at the AERO Friedrichshafen show in 2010. Skyleader also does aerospace manufacturing subcontract work and produced the doors for the Airbus A320 airliner.

The Bulgarian company ACS started producing the Skyleader 600 at the state owned TEREM-Letets aircraft factory in Sofia in July 2015 under a licence agreement.

== Aircraft ==
Summary of aircraft built by Skyleader
Model name	First flight	Number built	Type
Skyleader 100	2011		Two seat low wing microlight
Skyleader 150			Two seat low wing microlight
Skyleader 200 UL	1996		Two seat low wing microlight
Skyleader 400 MKIV	2013		Two seat low wing microlight
Skyleader 500 LSA			Two seat low wing light-sport aircraft
Skyleader 600 RG	2010		Two seat low wing light-sport aircraft
Skyleader GP One	2010		Two seat high wing microlight

== See also ==
- Light aircraft manufacturers in the Czech Republic
