= Skyway Products =

German aircraft manufacturer

- Company type: Privately held company
- Industry: Aerospace
- Founded: circa 2003
- Defunct: circa late 2005
- Fate: Out of business (c. 2005)
- Headquarters: Ettenheim, Germany
- Products: Paramotors
- Parent: Klenhart Graphik

Skyway Products was a German aircraft manufacturer based in Ettenheim. The company specialized in the design and manufacture of paramotors in the form of ready-to-fly aircraft for the US FAR 103 Ultralight Vehicles rules and the European Fédération Aéronautique Internationale microlight category.

The company seems to have been founded about 2003 and gone out of business late in 2005 and was a subsidiary of Klenhart Graphik, a graphic design concern.

The company was noted for its use of composites to save weight, including in its propellers, engine mounts and integral fuel tanks. It also utilized its own engine design, the Skyway T170.

The company's sole aircraft model was the Skyway Light paramotor.

== Aircraft ==
Summary of aircraft built by Skyway Products
Model name	First flight	Number built	Type
Skyway Light	2003		paramotor
