= Skyrider Flugschule =

German aircraft manufacturer

- Company type: Privately held company
- Industry: Aerospace
- Headquarters: Wernberg-Köblitz, Bavaria, Germany
- Products: Ultralight trikes
- Services: flight training
- Website: www.skyrider-ul.de

Skyrider Flugschule (English: Skyrider Flying School) is a German aircraft manufacturer based in Wernberg-Köblitz, Bavaria. The company specializes in the design and manufacture of ultralight trikes.

In addition to aircraft construction the company also operates a flight training school and collaborates with Ramphos in the design and development of amphibious aircraft. The Skyrider Sonic's trike structure is used in the Ramphos Trident amphibious trike.

The company's trike designs utilize some unusual construction methods. The Skyrider Sonic uses a stainless steel structure and a Smart Car powerplant, while the Skyrider Stingray is built from welded square steel tubing.

== Aircraft ==
Summary of aircraft built by Skyrider Flugschule
Model name	First flight	Number built	Type
Skyrider Sonic			ultralight trike
Skyrider Stingray	2007		ultralight trike
