= Sky Paragliders =

Paraglider manufacturer

Sky Paragliders A.S.
- Type: Akciová společnost
- Industry: Aerospace
- Founded: 1988
- Headquarters: Frýdlant nad Ostravicí, Czech Republic
- Products: Paragliders
- Website: www.sky-cz.com

Sky Paragliders A.S. is a Czech aircraft manufacturer based in Frýdlant nad Ostravicí. The company specializes in the design and manufacture of paragliders in the form of ready-to-fly aircraft. The company also produces paragliding harnesses, reserve parachutes and paragliding accessories.

The company is organized as an Akciová společnost, a Czech joint-stock company.

Reviewer Noel Bertrand described the company in a 2003 review as having "a reputation for quality machines...[that] are very pleasant to fly, high performance and well built". He rated their harnesses as "excellent".

== History ==
Sky Paragliders grew out of a merger of the Slovenian company Sky Servis with its Czech production facility. Sky Servis had been formed in 1988. The company headquarters, design and production facilities are located in Frýdlant nad Ostravicí at the Beskydy Protected Landscape Area.

The company consistently outgrew its facilities, which were expanded several times in the 1990s. A new plant was built in 2002 and opened late in that year. The company is ISO 9001 certified.

The company has stated its commitment to retaining production in Europe and not out-sourcing to Asia, saying, "The company is proud to remain in Europe, as we still think there is no more East if we move eastwards and therefore we rather invest into hyper modern technologies and know how and - last but not least - the production team that is essential for the success of the company." It uses, for example, canopy fabric from Porcher Sport (France), suspension lines from Edelrid and LIROS (Germany), and polyester webbing for its risers from Mouka Tišnov (Czech Republic).

By 2003 the company was offering a full line of paragliders, including the beginner Fides, the beginner to intermediate Atis, the intermediate Lift, the intermediate and cross country Brontes, the advanced performance Flirt, the competition Flare and the two-place Golem for flight training.

== Aircraft ==
Summary of aircraft built by Sky Paragliders:

- Sky Argos
- Sky Anakis
- Sky Apollo
- Sky Atis
- Sky Aya
- Sky Brontes
- Sky Eole
- Sky Fides
- Sky Flare
- Sky Flirt
- Sky Gaia
- Sky Golem
- Sky Kea
- Sky Metis
- Sky Lift
- Sky Zorro
- Sky Fujin
