= Skyrunner Paramotor Laboratory =

Russian aircraft manufacturer

- Company type: Privately held company
- Industry: Aerospace
- Founded: 1996
- Headquarters: Pskov, Russia
- Products: Paramotors
- Website: www.skyrunner.ru

Skyrunner Paramotor Laboratory (often just called Skyrunner) is a Russian aircraft manufacturer based in Pskov and founded in 1996. The company specializes in the design and manufacture of paramotors in the form of ready-to-fly aircraft for the US FAR 103 Ultralight Vehicles rules and the European microlight category.

The company has produced a wide range of paramotors named in English for their attributes, including the Basic, Booster, Light and the Powerful.

== Aircraft ==
Summary of aircraft built by Skyrunner
Model name	First flight	Number built	Type
Skyrunner Basic	1996		Paramotor
Skyrunner Booster	1996		Paramotor
Skyrunner Light	1996		Paramotor
Skyrunner Powerful	1996		Paramotor
