= Skymaster Powered Parachutes =

American aircraft manufacturer

- Company type: Privately held company
- Industry: Aerospace
- Founded: 2001
- Defunct: 2008
- Headquarters: Hartland, Wisconsin, United States
- Products: Powered parachute kit aircraft

Skymaster Powered Parachutes was an American aircraft manufacturer based in Hartland, Wisconsin. The company specialized in the design and manufacture of powered parachutes in the form of kits for amateur construction under the US Experimental - Amateur-built aircraft rules and the European Fédération Aéronautique Internationale microlight category.

The company roots trace to 1998 when development of the new powered parachute design was commenced. Development work continued until 2001 when the design was finalized and the company was founded to market the new design, designated as the Skymaster Excel. The company seems to have gone out of business in 2008.

The Excel went on to win many awards, including 2001 Sun 'n Fun Grand Champion, 2001 AirVenture Oshkosh Flex-wing Champion, 2002 AirVenture Oshkosh Flex-wing Champion, 2003 AirVenture Oshkosh Flex-wing Champion, 2003 Sun 'n Fun Innovations and 2004 Sun 'n Fun Best Trike. In August 2015 ten examples of the Excel were registered in the United States with the Federal Aviation Administration.

From 2004 until the time of its dissolution the company had been working on a single seat powered parachute design for operation under the US FAR 103 Ultralight Vehicles rules. Development included a version that would employ hand controls only for paraplegic pilots, but the aircraft does not seem to have entered production or received a formal designation.

== Aircraft ==
Summary of aircraft built by Skymaster Powered Parachutes
| Model name | First flight | Number built | Type |
|---|---|---|---|
| Skymaster Excel | 2001 | at least ten | Two seat powered parachute |
| Skymaster Single Seater | 2004 | probably just one prototype | single seat powered parachute |
