= McIntyre =

McIntyre, McEntire, MacIntyre, McAteer, and McIntire are Scottish and Irish surnames derived from the Gaelic Mac an tSaoir literally meaning "son of the Craftsman or Mason", but more commonly cited as "son of the Carpenter." The corresponding English name is Wright. It is common in Ulster and the highlands of Scotland, found in Ireland mostly in counties Donegal, Londonderry, Tyrone and Sligo.

The surname McIntyre was first found in Argyllshire (Gaelic erra Ghaidheal), the region of western Scotland corresponding roughly with the ancient Kingdom of Dál Riata, in the Strathclyde region of Scotland, now part of the Council Area of Argyll and Bute, where according legend, Maurice or Murdock, The Wright, (c.1150) became the first MacIntyre chief as a reward for helping his uncle, Somerled, King of Argyll and the Western Isles. The Gaelic form of the name MacAntSaoir Anglicised into the various spellings noted. In the ancient Irish annals, the first abbot of Clonmacnoise Saint Ciarán (c. 516 – c. 549) Ciarán mac an tSaeir ("son of the carpenter"), appears to be the oldest known record of the name; was one of the Twelve Apostles of Ireland.

== McIntyre ==
Notable people with the surname include:

- Ann McIntyre (Anna McIntyre) Coronation street character
- Archibald McIntyre (1772–1858), NY State Comptroller 1806–1821
- Arthur McIntyre (1918–2009), English Test cricketer
- Augustine McIntyre, Jr. (1876–1954), American brigadier general
- Bernard McIntyre (1942–2025), American politician in Oklahoma
- Christine McIntyre (1911–1984), American actress
- David McIntyre (born 1987), Canadian professional ice hockey player
- Donald McIntyre (1934–2025), operatic bass-baritone from New Zealand
- Dorothy Layne McIntyre (1917–2015), first African-American woman to receive a pilot's license from the Civil Aeronautics Authority
- Drew McIntyre (Drew Galloway) (born 1985), Scottish pro wrestler
- Duncan McIntyre (explorer)
- Eilidh McIntyre (born 1994), British sailor
- Elizabeth McIntyre
- Fleur McIntyre (born 1979), Australian basketball player and coach
- Frank McIntyre (actor) (1879–1949), American actor
- Frank McIntyre (baseball) (1859–1887), American baseball player
- Frank McIntyre (military officer) (1865–1944), American military officer
- Hope McIntyre, Canadian playwright and artistic director
- Hugh McIntyre (disambiguation), multiple people
- Iain McIntyre, Australian writer, musician and community radio broadcaster
- Ian McIntyre (1931–2014), British BBC Radio producer, journalist, broadcaster, and author
- Ian McIntyre (soccer) (born 1972), British-born coach of the Syracuse Orange men's soccer team in New York
- Irving McIntyre, Dominican politician and doctor
- James McIntyre (disambiguation), multiple people
- Jeff McIntyre (born 1954), American football player
- Jim McIntyre (disambiguation), multiple people
- Joe McIntyre (footballer) (born 1971), English footballer
- Joey McIntyre (born 1972), musician, New Kids on the Block member
- John Macintyre (1857–1928), Scottish radiologist
- Kevin McIntyre (disambiguation), multiple people
- Liam McIntyre (born 1982), Australian actor
- Larry McIntyre (1949–2024), Canadian ice hockey player
- Laurence McIntyre (1912–1981), Australian diplomat
- Margaret McIntyre (1886–1948), Tasmanian politician
- Mary McIntyre (Irish artist), Northern Irish photographer
- Mary McIntyre (New Zealand artist) (born 1928), New Zealand artist
- Mathew McIntyre, American politician
- Michael McIntyre (disambiguation), multiple people, including
  - Michael McIntyre, English comedian
  - Michael McIntyre (sailor)
- Mike McIntyre, American politician
- Natalie McIntyre, American R&B and soul singer and actress
- Patrick McIntyre (1844–1898), New Zealand cricketer
- Paul McIntyre (disambiguation), multiple people
- Patience and Prudence McIntyre (professionally known as Patience & Prudence) (born 1942 and 1945 respectively), American sister singing duo
- Reba McEntire (born 1955), American country singer
- Roger McIntyre, Scottish curler
- Steve McIntyre, primary author of the Climate Audit blog
- Taymor Travon McIntyre (born 2000), American rapper known professionally as Tay-K
- Terence McIntyre (born 1930), first-class cricketer and Royal Air Force officer
- Terrell McIntyre (born 1977), basketball player
- Thongchai McIntyre (born 1958), Thai singer
- Tommy McIntyre (born 1963), Scottish football player
- Vonda N. McIntyre (1948–2019), American science fiction author
- William McIntyre (disambiguation), multiple people

== MacIntyre ==
- Alasdair MacIntyre (1929–2025), British-American philosopher
- Angus Macintyre
- Archibald T. MacIntyre (1822–1900), US Representative from Georgia
- Auron MacIntyre, American author and podcast host for Blaze Media
- Battleman Milton MacIntyre (1907–1968), Canadian politician in BC
- Ben Macintyre
- Carlyle Ferren MacIntyre
- Colin MacIntyre
- David Lowe MacIntyre
- Donal MacIntyre
- Donald MacIntyre (disambiguation) (including people named Donald McIntyre)
- Drew MacIntyre
- Duncan MacIntyre (disambiguation), multiple people, including:
  - Duncan Ban MacIntyre
- Elisabeth MacIntyre
- Ernest MacIntyre
- F. Gwynplaine MacIntyre
- Hilke MacIntyre
- Iain Macintyre (1924–2008), British endocrinologist
- Jason MacIntyre
- John Macintyre
- Leanne MacIntyre
- Marguerite MacIntyre
- Mike MacIntyre
- Roly MacIntyre
- Scott MacIntyre
- Sheila Scott Macintyre
- Stuart Macintyre
- William MacIntyre

== Fictional characters ==
- Harper McIntyre, character from The 100
- Joe McIntyre, character from Coronation Street
- Luca McIntyre, character from Doctors
- Tina McIntyre, character from Coronation Street
- Dr. 'Trapper John' McIntyre, character from M*A*S*H, the (TV show, 1970 film, and book)

== See also ==
- McIntyre v. Ohio Elections Commission, a U.S. Supreme Court case concerning the right to anonymous speech
- McIntire
- McEntire
- Clan MacIntyre
