= McIntyre (disambiguation) =

McIntyre is a Scottish and Irish surname.

McIntyre may also refer to:

== Places ==
- McIntyre, Ontario (disambiguation), Canada, multiple locations
- McIntyre, Georgia, United States
- McIntyre, Ohio, United States
- McIntyre Township, Pennsylvania, United States
- Mount McIntyre, Antarctica

== Other ==
- Clan MacIntyre, a Scottish clan
- McIntyre Automobile, early 20th century US automobile brand
- McIntyre Ski Area, a ski resort in New Hampshire

== See also ==
- McIntire
- MacIntyre
