= American Airlines Flight 327 =

1957 aviation accident in Oklahoma

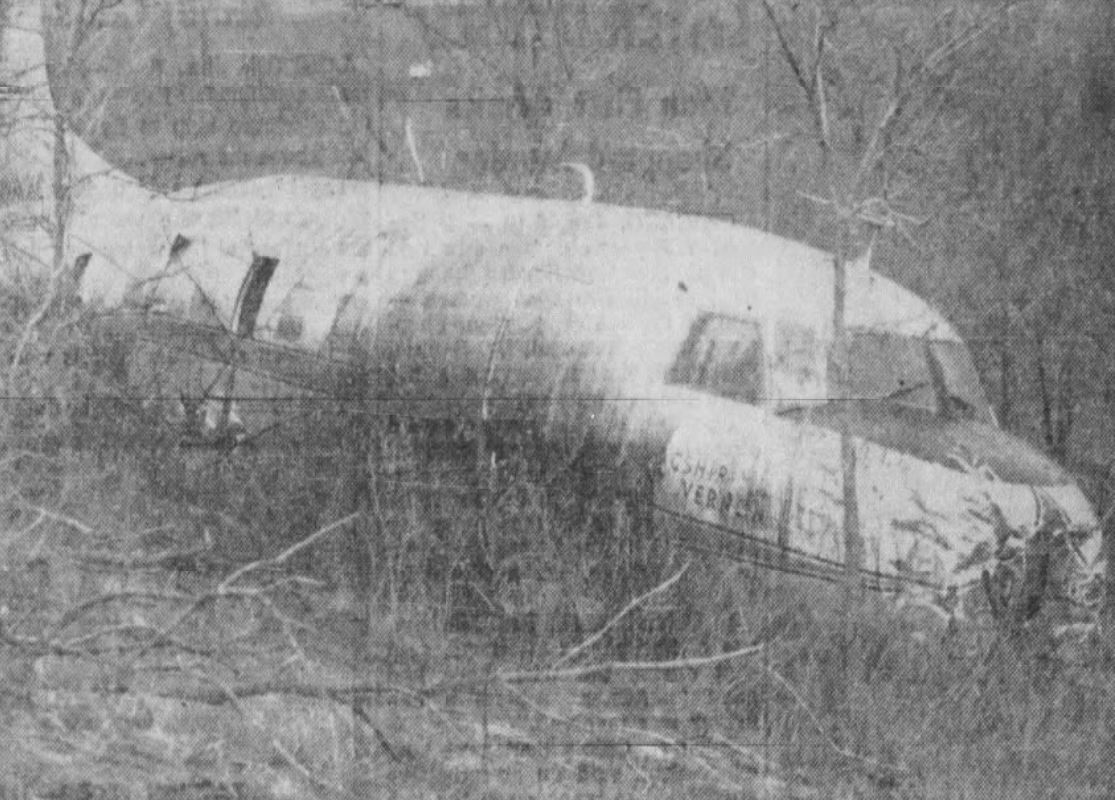
- The wreckage of the aircraft on the day after the crash

Accident
- Date: January 6, 1957
- Summary: Controlled flight into terrain
- Site: Near Tulsa, Oklahoma, United States; 36.267°N 95.898°W

Aircraft
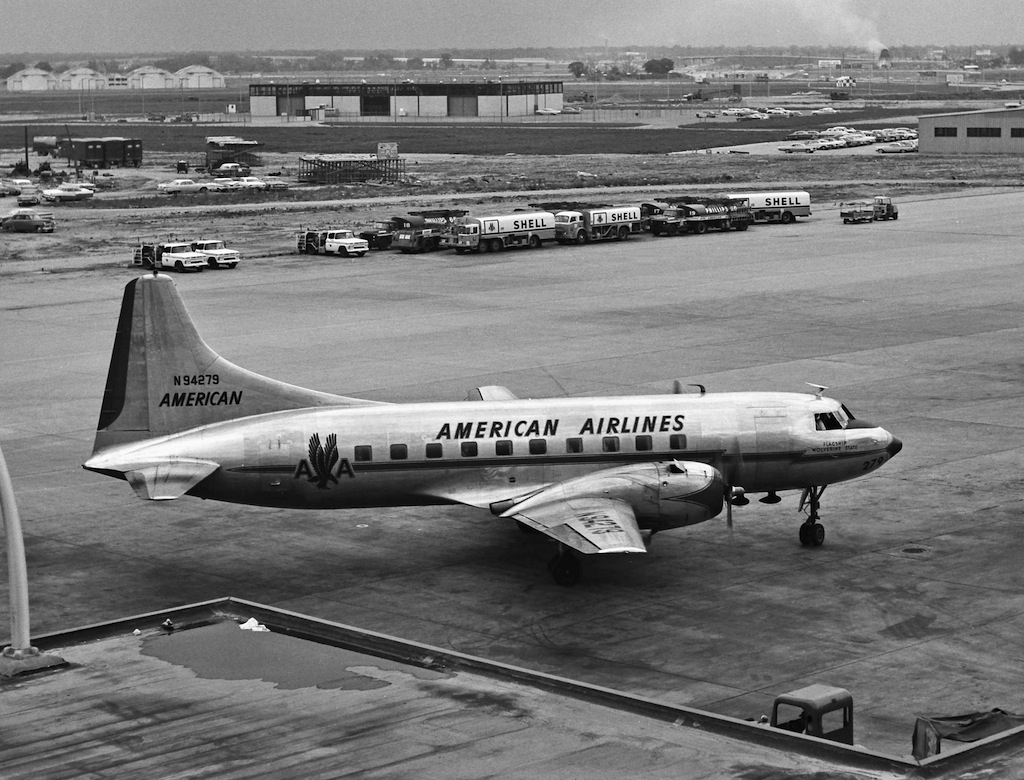
- An American Airlines Convair CV-240, similar to the aircraft involved
- Aircraft type: Convair CV-240-0
- Aircraft name: Flagship Mount Vernon
- Operator: American Airlines
- Registration: N94247
- Flight origin: T. F. Green Airport, near Providence, Rhode Island
- Stopovers: Logan Airport, Boston; LaGuardia Airport, New York City; Hancock Airport, Syracuse, New York; Rochester Municipal Airport, Rochester, New York; Willow Run Airport, Detroit; Midway Airport, Chicago; Lambert Municipal Airport, St. Louis; Springfield Municipal Airport, Springfield, Missouri; Joplin Municipal Airport, Joplin, Missouri
- Destination: Tulsa Municipal Airport, Tulsa, Oklahoma
- Occupants: 10
- Passengers: 7
- Crew: 3
- Fatalities: 1
- Injuries: 7
- Survivors: 9

American Airlines Flight 327 was a scheduled flight between T. F. Green Airport near Providence, Rhode Island and Tulsa Municipal Airport in Tulsa, Oklahoma, with ten intermediate stops. On January 6, 1957, the Convair CV-240-0 performing the flight crashed while performing an instrument approach to Tulsa Municipal Airport, killing one of the occupants and injuring seven. Weather conditions in the area were poor, and the aircraft descended through dense clouds and fog. As it approached the runway, it flew lower than the intended path and crashed into the ground 3.6 miles (5.8 km) north of the approach end of the runway. The probable cause of the crash was determined to be the captain's lack of alertness in allowing the first officer to continue an instrument descent to an altitude too low to permit terrain clearance.

== Background ==
Flight 327 was a regularly scheduled flight between T. F. Green Airport near Providence, Rhode Island and Tulsa Municipal Airport with intermediate stops at Logan Airport in Boston; LaGuardia Airport in New York City; Hancock Airport in Syracuse, New York; Rochester Municipal Airport in Rochester, New York; Willow Run Airport near Detroit; Midway Airport in Chicago; Lambert Municipal Airport near St. Louis; Springfield Municipal Airport in Springfield, Missouri; and Joplin Municipal Airport near Joplin, Missouri. It was operated by American Airlines using one of the company's 40-passenger Convair CV-240 twin radial engine aircraft. The airline operated this type of aircraft on its short-haul routes between 1948 and 1964.

On January 5, 1957, the scheduled flight's first legs between Providence and Chicago were uneventful, but its departure from Chicago was delayed as maintenance technicians in Chicago worked on a problem with the plane's fire alarm warning system. The problem caused warning flights to flash and a warning bell to ring. Technicians repaired the problem, and the outbound flight to St. Louis left one hour and forty minutes late. The problem with the fire alarm warning system did not occur again after the repairs. The aircraft left Joplin at 11:23 p.m. Central Standard Time, en route to Tulsa, with seven passengers, two pilots, and one flight attendant.

== Accident ==
At 11:47 p.m., as the flight approached Tulsa, the crew contacted the Tulsa approach controller, who relayed the current weather report. That weather report included a ceiling of 600 feet (180 m), a visibility of 2.5 miles (4 km), very light drizzle and fog, and calm winds. As the aircraft approached the airport, the crew asked the controller if they should expect any delays due to other aircraft taking off or landing, and were told that the only other traffic in the area was then making an ILS approach. Shortly after that, the controller advised the flight that the visibility had dropped to 1.75 miles (2.8 km) and that the United States Weather Bureau was checking the ceiling. He asked if the pilots would prefer the Owasso straight-in approach from the north, or if they would prefer an ILS approach, and the pilots responded that they would make the Owasso approach. At midnight, the flight was cleared to land on runway 17L. Two minutes later, the controller gave a weather update to the flight, which included a measured ceiling of only 200 feet (61 m), visibility 1.75 miles (2.8 km) and very light drizzle and fog. This transmission was not acknowledged by the pilots and all other attempts by the controller to contact the pilots were unsuccessful. At one minute after midnight on January 6, the aircraft crashed into a hillside west of Owasso, Oklahoma, 3.6 miles (5.8 km) north of the approach end of the runway.

The plane first hit the top of a tree, then struck the ground, leaving deep tire imprints and gouges from the propellers in the ground. The landing gear collapsed and the aircraft slid along the ground, then became airborne again as it glided over a ravine, and finally came to rest 540 feet (160 m) from the initial point of impact. The aircraft stopped under a high voltage power line, leaking aviation fuel, but there was no fire. The wings were separated from the aircraft, and the engines were torn off and found near the main wreckage. The nose section of the fuselage was crushed, and both pilot seats in the cockpit were torn from their sliding tracks. There was substantial damage to the rest of the fuselage, including a buckling of the structure in the cabin area, which distorted the cabin floor, causing seats to detach.

The accident was the first fatal accident that American Airlines had experienced since the crash of Flight 476 in August 1955.

== Aftermath ==
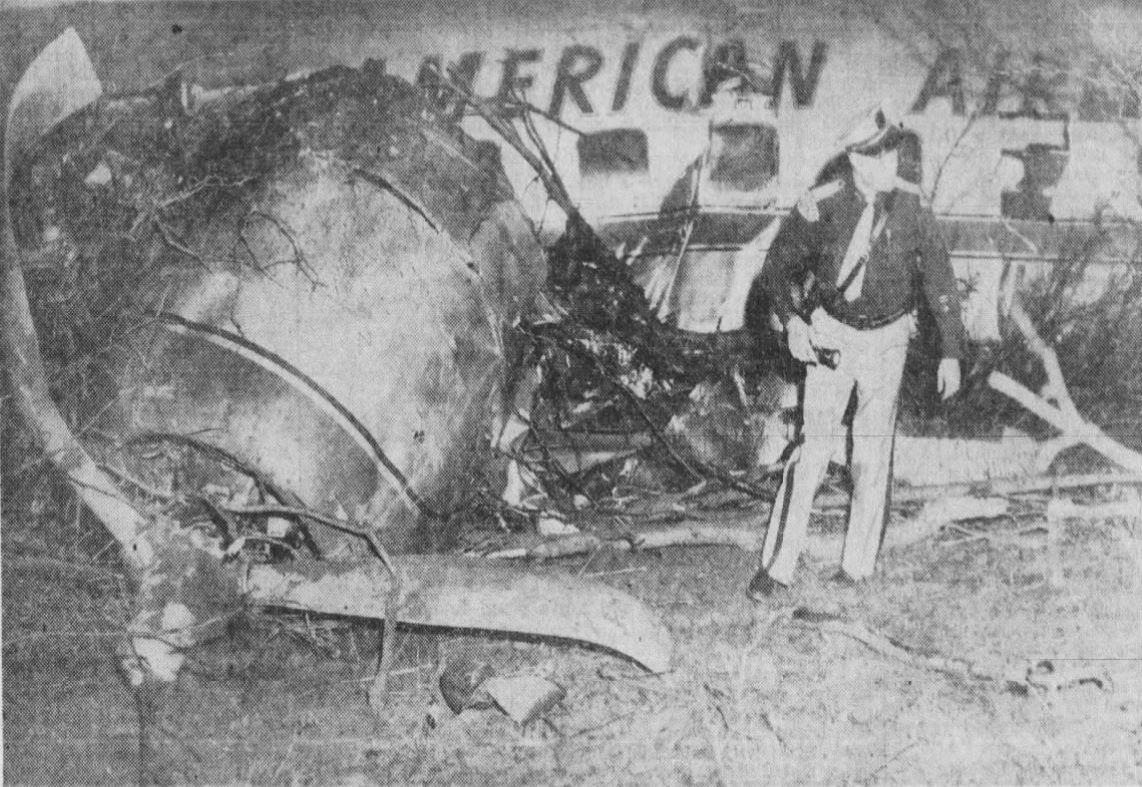
A police officer stands next to the wreckage of the aircraft

After the crash, the passengers and crew were able to open two of the three exits on the aircraft and most of them evacuated. One badly injured passenger was pinned inside the plane, unable to get out. The first officer exited from the side window of the cockpit.

The first officer and one of the passengers separately left the accident scene to look for help. The two were picked up by a vehicle that had been driving towards the crash site after seeing lights on it. Meanwhile, the air traffic controller, having lost contact with the aircraft, notified the Oklahoma Highway Patrol that the plane was missing and asked them to check out the area near the Owasso checkpoint. Ambulances and emergency equipment arrived and transported the occupants of the aircraft to two hospitals in the area.

The Civil Aeronautics Board (CAB) sent two investigators to Tulsa to lead the investigation alongside local officials. The officials met with officials from American Airlines to set up teams in various areas of investigation and later announced that team members had been forbidden to talk with reporters until the investigation was complete. The CAB stated that it expected the investigation into the crash to take about a week. After dismissing the possibility of structural failure as a cause of the crash, the fuselage of the aircraft was cut up and sold for scrap metal and American Airlines officials estimated that the wreckage would be cleared from the site by January 11.

The injured passenger, a 70-year-old woman from Tulsa, ended up dying from her injuries. One of the other injured passengers was released from the hospital in the days following the crash, but the rest remained for a week or more.

== Aircraft ==
The aircraft was a Convair CV-240-0 piston aircraft, serial number 104, registered as tail number N94247. The construction of the aircraft had been completed on October 7, 1948. Named "Flagship Mount Vernon", it had flown for a total of 18,062 hours. With a capacity of 40 passengers, American Airlines's Convair CV-240 fleet was used on short-haul flights, and the company placed an initial order for 100 of the aircraft in 1946, later reduced to 75. The company promoted the speed of the performance of the aircraft, offering the same speeds and climb rates as the 52-passenger, 4-engine Douglas DC-6 aircraft the company used on its long-haul routes.

== Passengers and crew ==
The flight carried seven passengers and three crew members, all residents of the United States. The captain of the flight, 35-year-old Wesley G. Mims, had been employed by American Airlines for nearly fourteen years. At the time of the accident, he had flown for a total of 8,655 hours, including 4,100 hours in Convair aircraft. He suffered cracked ribs and severe facial cuts in the crash. The first officer, 34-year-old Paul H. Johnson, had been employed with the company for over ten years. At the time of the crash, he had a total of 2,170 flying hours, including 924 in Convair aircraft. He suffered severe bruises and rib fractures in the crash, and could not remember anything that happened immediately before or during the crash.

== Investigation ==
The CAB held public hearings in Tulsa on February 27-28, 1957. During the hearings, the board heard testimony that there may have been a mechanical problem with the altimeters on the plane. Investigators after the crash found that the captain's altimeter read −200 feet (−61 m) when it should have read zero, and the co-pilot's altimeter read 220 feet (67 m) when it should have read 647 feet (197 m). However, the investigators could not state with any certainty whether the altimeters were malfunctioning before the crash, or if they had been damaged in the crash. Captain Mims testified that after the flight from St. Louis to Springfield, he noticed that his altimeter read −100 feet (−30 m) on the ground when it should have read zero, but that he forgot to report the incident. Company regulations required corrective actions before takeoff when such inaccuracies are noted. During the flight, the first officer's altimeter was set to show the elevation above mean sea level, and the captain's altimeter was set to show the elevation above the Tulsa airport ground level of 674 feet (205 m) above sea level. Captain Mims testified that during the final segment, he and the first officer had double-checked the plane's two altimeters against each other several times. He testified that he last recalled observing a reading of 700 feet (210 m) on his altimeter just before the crash. After receiving approach clearance, he said he extended the landing gear and instructed Johnson to descend at a rate of 1,000 feet (300 m) per minute.

The first officer, Paul Johnson, testified that he and the captain had alternated flying each of the legs of the flight, and on the leg between Joplin and Tulsa, it was the first officer who was in command of the aircraft. The day's flights had been the first time that Mims and Johnson had flown together, and it was also the first time Johnson had flown an instrument approach into Tulsa. The investigation revealed that the crew had originally reported to work at Tulsa at 8:50 A.M. on January 5, and that they had been on duty for fifteen hours on the day of the crash.

On March 7, 1957, the CAB suspended the flying permit of Captain Mims for six months, stating that even though First Officer Johnson had been flying the aircraft at the time of the crash, it was the Captain's responsibility to supervise the flight, and said that Mims had been careless in monitoring the first officer as he conducted the landing approach. The suspension meant that Mims could continue to fly as a first officer, but not as a captain.

In January 1958, the CAB released its final report. It concluded that a "lack of alertness" on the part of Captain Mims probably caused the plane crash. It said that Mims permitted the aircraft to be flown too low to clear the terrain in the area. The investigation concluded that it was likely that when Mims instructed the first officer to descend to 700 feet (210 m), he did not clearly state that he meant 700 feet above ground level, which would have been read on the captain's altimeter, and not 700 feet above sea level, which would have been indicated on the first officer's altimeter. A descent to 700 feet above sea level would have placed the aircraft at or near ground level. The investigators faulted the captain for his failure to notice that the aircraft had descended below the minimum safe altitude in time to prevent the crash.
