= McIntire =

McIntire is a surname. Notable people with the surname include:

- Albert McIntire (1853–1935), American politician from Colorado
- Barbara McIntire (1935–2025), American amateur golfer
- Carl McIntire (1906–2002), a founder and minister in the Bible Presbyterian Church
- Clifford McIntire (1908–1974), US Congressman from Maine
- Harry McIntire (John Reid McIntire) (1879–1949), pitcher for the Brooklyn Superbas
- Henry McIntire (1835–1863), Union Army officer and lawyer
- Jim McIntire, U.S. gunfighter, Texas Ranger in the Old West
- John McIntire (1759–1815), founder of the city of Zanesville, Ohio
- John McIntire (1907–1991), American character actor
- Lani McIntyre aka Lani McIntire (1904–1951), a Hawaiian guitar and steel guitar player
- Larry McIntire, American engineer
- Lucy Barrow McIntire (1886–1967), American activist, preservationist, actor, and poet
- Paul Goodloe McIntire (1860–1952), U.S. stock broker, investor, and philanthropist
- Rufus McIntire (1784–1866), U.S. lawyer, congressman
- Samuel McIntire (1757–1811), American architect and craftsman
- Tim McIntire (1944–1986), American character actor
- William Watson McIntire (1850–1912), U.S. Congressman from Maryland

== Fictional characters ==
- Molly McIntire, character from the American Girl toy franchise

== See also ==
- McIntire, Iowa, city in Mitchell County, Iowa, United States
- Herman McIntire House, historic house in Quincy, Massachusetts
- McIntire Garrison House, historic house in York, Maine
- McIntire Investment Institute, student-run equity fund at the University of Virginia
- McIntire–Stennis Act of 1962, for U.S. state agricultural experiment stations and forestry schools
- McIntyre (disambiguation)
