= Tulsa Air and Space Museum & Planetarium =

- Location in Oklahoma
- Established: 1998
- Location: Tulsa International Airport, Tulsa, Oklahoma
- Coordinates: 36.2069°N 95.8956°W
- Type: Aviation museum
- Website: www.tulsamuseum.org

The Tulsa Air and Space Museum (TASM) is an aerospace museum in Tulsa, Oklahoma, United States. It is located in the northwest corner of the Tulsa International Airport property. It has 19,000 square feet (1,800 m^{2}) of historical exhibits, hands-on activities, and vintage aircraft. A full-dome planetarium was added in 2006. The museum also has educational facilities for school visits, summer camps, and Scout groups.

== History ==
The Museum first opened its doors in May 1998 at a location inside a 1940s-era hangar on the Spartan School of Aeronautics campus. But by 2005, the museum had relocated to its current location in the Sherman and Ellie Smith Hangar One building, which offered additional room. In 2006, the museum opened its planetarium.

== Exhibits ==
The Entrance to TASM's Hangar One

In Hangar One, the museum's exhibits present a chronological history of aviation in Tulsa. The Early Birds exhibit explains the beginnings of aviation in Tulsa, with a special focus on Tulsa aviation pioneer Duncan A. McIntyre. The next exhibit is highlighted by a scale replica of Tulsa's original art deco airport terminal, originally designed by Leon B. Senter. The terminal's original cast iron door frames, cornerstone, terra cotta decoration and ornate art deco sconces are presented inside the exhibit, along with historic documents and photographs. The Pearl Harbor survivors' exhibit presents an interactive touch-screen that allows visitors to listen to Oklahoma survivors of the Pearl Harbor attacks share their experiences of that fateful day.

The Interior of TASM's Hangar One

The World War II exhibit also highlights Tulsa's contributions to the war, with presentations on the Spartan Aircraft Company, the Spartan College of Aviation and Technology and the Douglas Bomber Plant. A commercial aviation exhibit presents historic uniforms, documents, and photos from American Airlines, Trans World Airlines and other commercial carriers. American Airlines gets special attention due to the presence in Tulsa of the largest private aircraft maintenance base in the world, owned and operated by American. The space exhibit presents information on Tulsa's participation in the crewed and uncrewed space programs, beginning with the first Peaceful Uses of Space Conference held in Tulsa on May 26, 1961. Oklahoma astronauts are honored, while visitors have the opportunity to operate a mockup of the Space Shuttle's robotic arm.

Present in Hangar One are several historic aircraft. Worthy of mention is one of the only surviving Spartan C-2 aircraft, one of two surviving Rockwell Ranger 2000's, a Spartan NP-1 and an F-14 Tomcat. A WW2-era A-26 Invader was added in 2026 as a static display; the aircraft was previously flown as the Commemorative Air Force’s Lady Liberty. A-26 planes were built in Tulsa during the war, although not this particular aircraft.

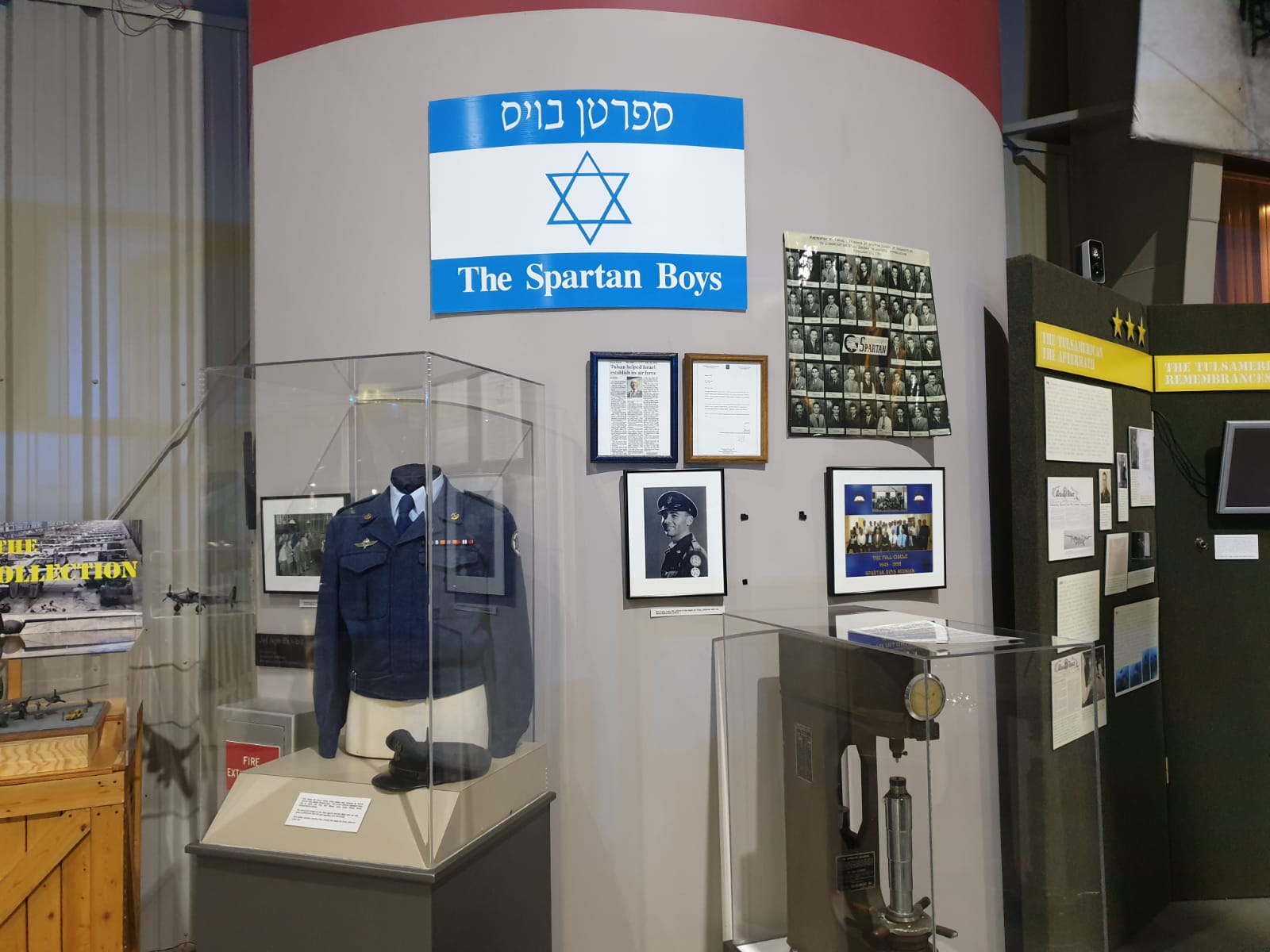
The small exhibition that is dedicated to the training of 42 technical staff of the very young Israeli Air Force in 1949

A small exhibition is dedicated to the story of the training of 42 technical staff members of the young Israeli Air Force, who in 1949 came to the Spartan College of Aviation and Technology in Tulsa, for a 9-month training. They were "adopted" while they were there by families of the Tulsa Jewish community. Upon completion of their training, they returned to Israel as certified aircraft mechanics.

The museum's collections focus primarily on Tulsa's aviation history.

== Planetarium ==
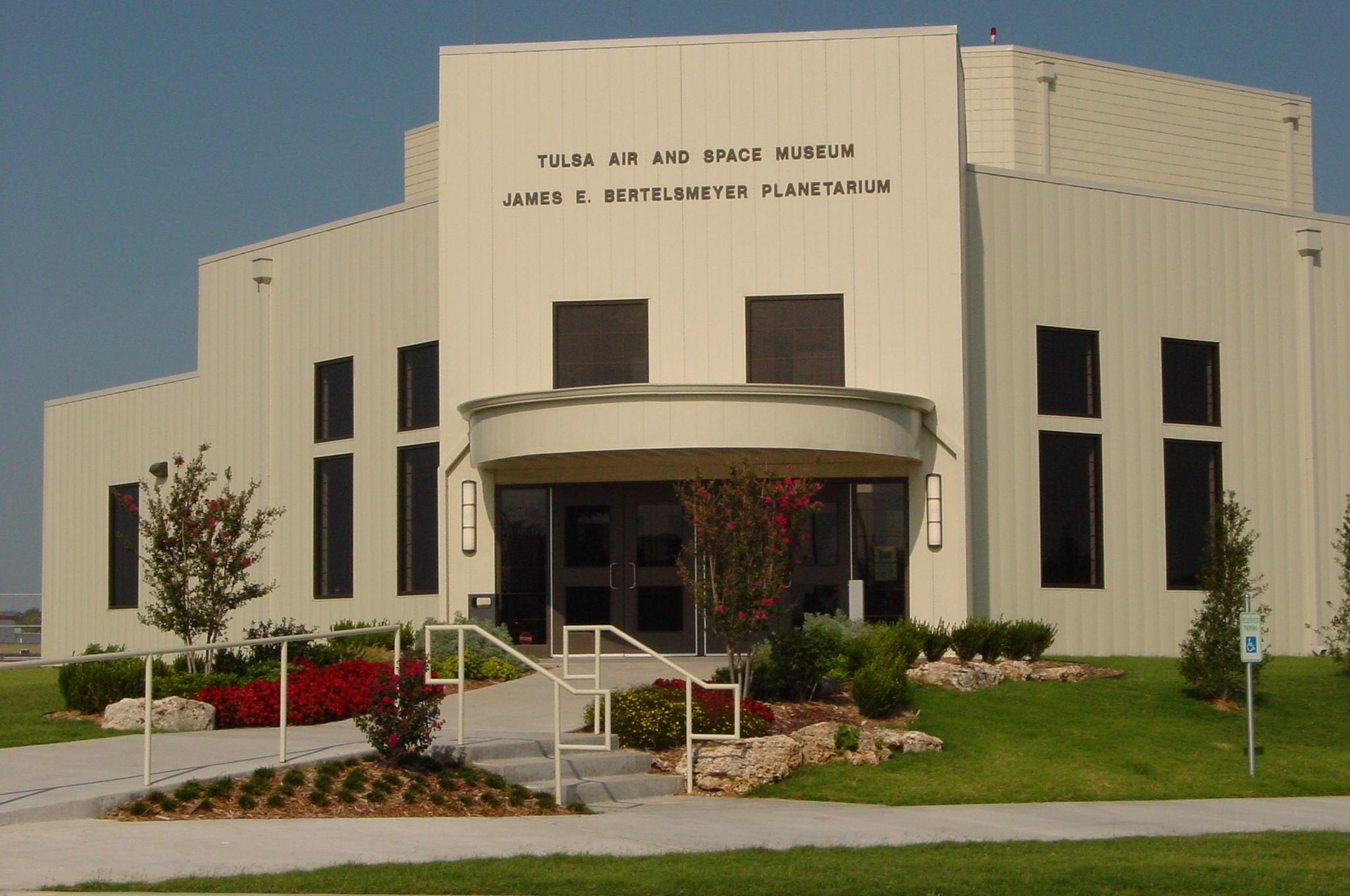
The James E. Bertelsmeyer Planetarium

The James E. Bertelsmeyer Planetarium opened at the Tulsa Air and Space Museum in May 2006. The planetarium uses 360-degree high-definition full-dome technology, and features a 50 ft (15 m) diameter dome. The planetarium offers full-dome digital shows as well as traditional star shows, and hosts community events.

== See also ==
- List of planetariums
