= William MacIntyre (disambiguation) =

William MacIntyre (c. 1791–1857) was a Scottish physician.

William MacIntyre may also refer to:

- Triumph (comics), real name William MacIntyre

== See also ==
- William Macintyre (born 2007), British racing driver
- William McIntyre (disambiguation)
