= Flight 476 =

Flight 476 may refer to:

- American Airlines Flight 476, crashed on 4 August 1955
- British Airways Flight 476, crashed on 10 September 1976
