= Duncan MacIntyre =

Duncan MacIntyre or Duncan McIntyre may refer to:

- Duncan Ban MacIntyre (1724–1812), Scottish Gaelic poet
- Duncan MacIntyre (New Zealand politician) (1915–2001), New Zealand politician
- Duncan McIntyre (businessman) (1834–1894), Canadian businessman
- Duncan McIntyre (explorer) (1831–1866), Australian explorer
- Duncan A. McIntyre, American aviation pioneer
- Duncan John McIntyre (1842–1920), Canadian lawyer and political figure from Ontario
