= James McIntire =

James McIntire may refer to:

- James McIntire (author), late 19th century author who wrote about his experiences as a Texas Ranger
- James McIntire (politician) (born 1953), State Treasurer of Washington

== See also ==
- James McIntyre (disambiguation)
