= William McIntyre =

William McIntyre may refer to:

- William McIntyre (English cricketer) (1844–1892), English cricketer who played for Nottinghamshire and Lancashire
- William McIntyre (Australian cricketer) (1877–1943), Australian cricketer who played for New South Wales
- William McIntyre (corporal), (1951–1984), a Canadian police officer whose killing remains unsolved
- William McIntyre (judge) (1918–2009), Canadian Puisne Justice of the Supreme Court of Canada
- William McIntyre (minister) (1806–1870), Scottish-Australian Presbyterian minister and educator
- William McIntyre (New Zealand politician) (1881–1949), member of the New Zealand Legislative Council
- William McIntyre (Australian politician) (1869–1902), New South Wales politician
- W. David McIntyre (1932–2022), New Zealand historian
- William Victor McIntyre (1887–1964), New Zealand shepherd, farmer, dog breeder and handler
- Bill McIntyre (actor) (1929–2010), American actor
- Bill McIntyre (Canadian football) (born 1964), Canadian football wide receiver
- Bill McIntyre (footballer) (1897–1971), Australian rules footballer
- William H S McIntyre (born 1960), Scottish crime novelist

== See also ==
- William MacIntyre (disambiguation)
