= Hugh McIntyre =

Hugh McIntyre may refer to:

- Hugh McIntyre (footballer) (1855–1905), Scottish footballer
- Hugh McIntyre (farmer) (1888–1982), New Zealand farmer and freezing company chairman
- Hugh McIntyre (cricketer) (1857–1905), Scottish cricketer
