= Case report =

Detailed medical report on a patient

In medicine, a case report is a detailed report of the symptoms, signs, diagnosis, treatment, and follow-up of an individual patient. Case reports may contain a demographic profile of the patient, but usually describe an unusual or novel occurrence. Some case reports also contain a literature review of other reported cases. Case reports are professional narratives that provide feedback on clinical practice guidelines and offer a framework for early signals of effectiveness, adverse events, and cost. They can be shared for medical, scientific, or educational purposes.

== Types ==
Most case reports are on one of six topics:

- An unexpected association between diseases or symptoms.
- An unexpected event in the course of observing or treating a patient.
- Findings that shed new light on the possible pathogenesis of a disease or an adverse effect.
- Unique or rare features of a disease.
- Unique therapeutic approaches.
- A positional or quantitative variation of the anatomical structures.

== Roles in research and education ==
A case report is generally considered a type of anecdotal evidence. Given their intrinsic methodological limitations, including lack of statistical sampling, case reports are placed at the bottom of the hierarchy of clinical evidence, together with case series. Nevertheless, case reports do have genuinely useful roles in medical research and evidence-based medicine. In particular, they have facilitated recognition of new diseases and adverse effects of treatments. For example, the recognition of the link between administration of thalidomide to mothers and malformations in their babies was triggered by a case report. Case reports have a role in pharmacovigilance. They can also help understand the clinical spectrum of rare diseases as well as unusual presentations of common diseases. They can help generate study hypotheses, including plausible mechanisms of disease. Case reports may also have a role to play in guiding the personalization of treatments in clinical practice.

Proponents of case reports have outlined some particular advantages of the format. Case reports and series have a high sensitivity for detecting novelty and therefore remain one of the cornerstones of medical progress; they provide many new ideas in medicine. Whereas randomized clinical trials usually only inspect one variable or very few variables, rarely reflecting the full picture of a complicated medical situation, the case report can detail many different aspects of the patient's medical situation (e.g. patient history, physical examination, diagnosis, psychosocial aspects, follow up).

Because typical, unremarkable cases are less likely to be published, use of case reports as scientific evidence must take into account publication bias. Some case reports also contain an extensive review of the relevant literature on the topic at-hand (and sometimes a systematic review of available evidence). Reports adopting this sort of approach can be identified by terms such as a "case report and review of the literature". Reports containing broader active research such as this might be considered case studies in the true definition of the term.

Case reports can also play a relevant role in medical education by providing a structure for case-based learning.

A particular attraction of case reports is the possibility of quick publication (with respect to more extensive studies such as randomized control trials), allowing them to act as a kind of rapid short communication between busy clinicians who may not have the time or resources to conduct large scale research.

== Reporting guidelines ==
The quality of the scientific reporting of case reports is variable, and sub-optimal reporting hinders the use of case reports to inform research design or help guide clinical practice. In response to these issues, reporting guidelines are under development to facilitate greater transparency and completeness in the provision of relevant information for individual cases. The CARE (i.e. CAse REport) guidelines include a reporting checklist that is listed on the EQUATOR Network, an international initiative aimed at promoting transparent and accurate reporting of health research studies to enhance the value and reliability of medical research literature. This 13-item checklist includes indications regarding the title, key words, abstract, introduction, patient information, clinical findings, timeline, diagnostic assessment, therapeutic interventions, follow-up and outcomes, discussion, patient perspective, and informed consent. An explanation and elaboration article (a manual for writing case reports following the CARE guidelines) was published in the Journal of Clinical Epidemiology in 2017.

== Publishing ==
Many international journals publish case reports, but they restrict the number that appear in the print run because this has an adverse effect on the journal's impact factor. Case reports are often published online, and there is often still a requirement for a subscription to access them. However, an increasing number of journals are devoted to publishing case reports alone, most of which are open access. The first of these to start publishing, in 2001, was Grand Rounds.

There are a number of websites that allow patients to submit and share their own patient case reports with other people. PatientsLikeMe and Treatment Report are two such sites.

== Use of terminology outside science ==
The term is also used to describe non-scientific reports usually prepared for educational reasons.

== Famous scientific case reports ==
- Sigmund Freud reported on numerous cases, including Anna O., Dora, Little Hans, Rat Man, and Wolf Man
- Frederick Treves reported on "The Elephant Man"
- Paul Broca reported on language impairment following left hemisphere lesions in the 1860s.
- Joseph Jules Dejerine reported on a case of pure alexia.
- William MacIntyre reported on a case of multiple myeloma (described in the 1840s).
- Christiaan Barnard described the world's first heart transplant as a case report
- W. G. McBride, Thalidomide Case Report (1961). The Lancet 2:1358.

== See also ==
- Case series
- Case presentation
