= 138th Fighter Wing =

Air Force unit of the Oklahoma Air National Guard (US)

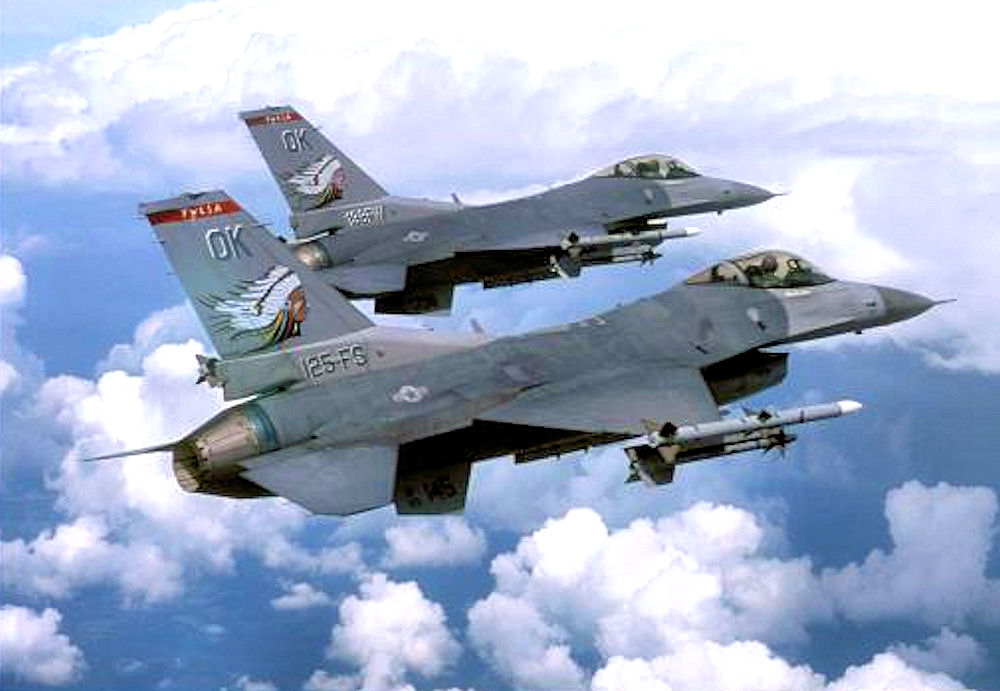
- Oklahoma ANG F-16 Fighting Falcons in the clouds (Note: Aircraft are General Dynamics F-16C Block 42 Fighting Falcons, serials 89-2138 and 89-2145.)
- Active: 1957–1973; 1973–present
- Country: United States
- Allegiance: Oklahoma
- Branch: Air National Guard
- Type: Wing
- Role: Attack
- Part of: Oklahoma Air National Guard
- Garrison/HQ: Tulsa Air National Guard Base, Oklahoma
- Motto: "Strength through Preparedness"
- Decorations: Air Force Outstanding Unit Award

Insignia
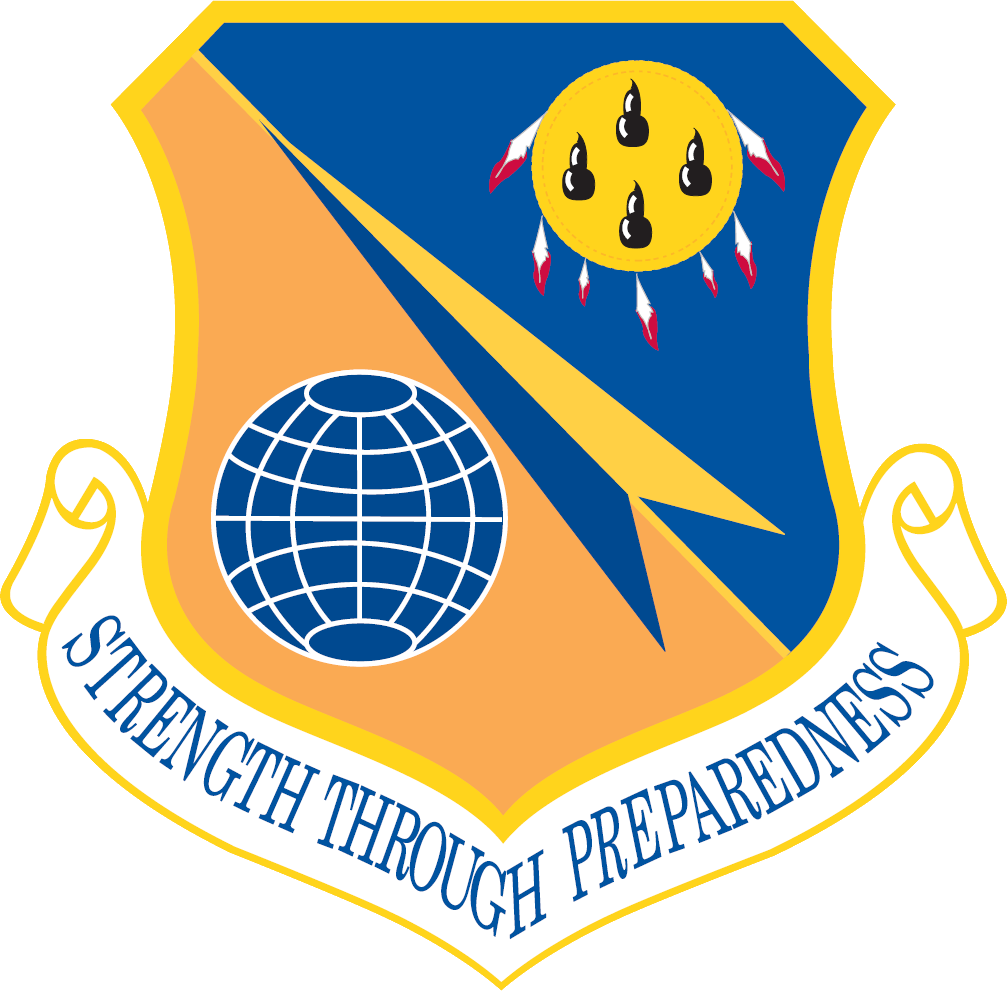
- 138th Fighter Wing emblem
- Tail stripe: Red with white 'Tulsa'
- Tail code: OK

The 138th Fighter Wing is a unit of the Oklahoma Air National Guard, stationed at the Tulsa Air National Guard Base at Tulsa International Airport in Tulsa, Oklahoma. It flies the F-16 Fighting Falcon. It has a state mission of disaster response and public safety and a federal mission of combat readiness and homeland defense missions under NORAD and Operation Noble Eagle. If activated to federal service as a United States Air Force unit, the wing is gained by the Air Combat Command.

== Mission ==
The wing is an Oklahoma Air National Guard unit stationed at Tulsa Air National Guard Base at Tulsa International Airport in Tulsa, Oklahoma.

As an Air National Guard unit, the 138th is part of the Air Reserve Component (ARC) of the U.S. Air Force and is operationally gained by the Air Combat Command. The wing currently flies the Block 42 version of the F-16C and F-16D Fighting Falcon.

The federal mission of the 138th is to maintain combat forces ready for mobilization, deployment, and employment as needed to support national security objectives.

The state mission of the 138th is to support the Governor of Oklahoma with units organized, equipped, and trained in the protection of life and property, and the preservation of peace, order, and public safety.

== Units ==
The 138th Fighter Wing consists of the following units:

- 138th Operations Group

125th Fighter Squadron

- 138th Maintenance Group
- 138th Mission Support Group
- 138th Medical Group
- 219th Engineering Installation Squadron

== History ==
In 1957, the Oklahoma Air National Guard was given a fighter-interceptor mission in the Air Defense Command (ADC), and on 1 August, the 125th Fighter-Bomber Squadron was authorized to expand to a group level. The 138th Fighter-Interceptor Group was authorized and extended federal recognition by the National Guard Bureau. The 125th Fighter-Interceptor Squadron becoming the group's flying unit. Other support squadrons assigned into the group were the 138th Headquarters, 138th Material Squadron (Maintenance), 138th Combat Support Squadron, and the 138th USAF Dispensary.

With the Fighter-Interceptor mission assignment, the 125th also assumed ADC runway alert program on full 24-hour basis—with armed jet fighters ready to "scramble" at a moment's notice. This event brought the group into the daily combat operational program of the USAF, placing us on "the end of the runway" alongside regular USAF-Air Defense Fighter Squadrons. The obsolescent F-80-day fighters were upgraded to the all-weather/day/night F-86D Sabre Interceptor by the end of the year. In June 1959 the squadron traded their F-86Ds for the upgraded F-86L Sabre Interceptor with uprated afterburning engines and new electronics.

=== Air Transport mission ===
In January 1960, the 138th FIS was reassigned to the Military Air Transport Service (MATS), trading in its Sabre interceptors for 4-engined C-97 Stratofreighter transports. With air transportation recognized as a critical wartime need, the unit was re-designated the 138th Air Transport Wing (Heavy) with the 125th Air Transport Squadron. During the 1961 Berlin Crisis, both the Group and squadron were federalized on 1 October 1961. From Tulsa, the 125th ATS augmented MATS airlift capability worldwide in support of the Air Force's needs. It returned again to Oklahoma state control on 31 August 1962. Throughout the 1960s, the 125th flew long-distance transport missions in support of Air Force requirements, frequently sending aircraft to the Caribbean, Europe, Australia, Hawaii, Japan, the Philippines, and during the Vietnam War, to both South Vietnam, Okinawa and Thailand. The C-97s were retired in 1968 and the unit was transferred to Military Airlift Command (MAC), being re-equipped with C-124C Globemaster II heavy transports. The Group continued to fly long-distance intercontinental airlift flights until the Globemasters were retired at the end of 1972.

=== Tactical Fighter mission ===
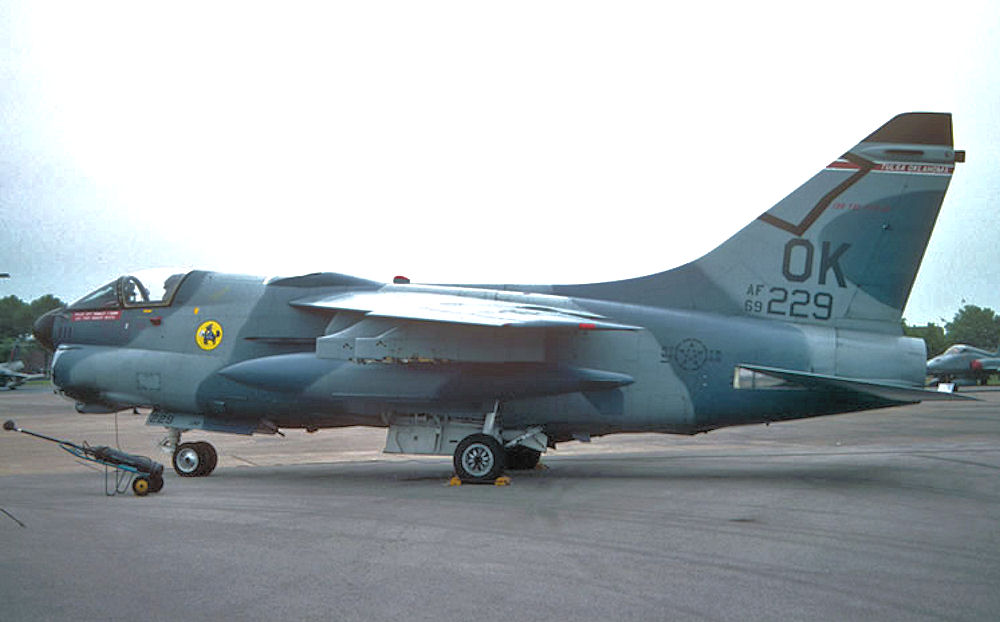
125th Tactical Fighter Squadron A-7D Corsair II, AF Ser. No. 69-6229, circa 1989

With the retirement of the Globemasters, the 138th was transferred to Tactical Air Command on 25 January 1973, with the 125th Tactical Fighter Squadron being re-equipped with veteran F-100D/F Super Sabre tactical fighter bombers that were returning from the Vietnam War. The Super Sabre was dedicated fighter-bomber, with no concession being made to a secondary air-superiority role and the squadron trained in using the fighter for ground support. Beginning in 1975, the 125th began a NATO commitment, with squadron aircraft and personnel deploying to the United States Air Forces in Europe (USAFE) for Autumn Forge/Cold Fire/Reforger exercises.

In 1978, the F-100s were being retired, and they were replaced with A-7D Corsair II subsonic tactical close air support aircraft from the 23d Tactical Fighter Wing, England AFB, Louisiana along with the 354th Tactical Fighter Wing, Myrtle Beach AFB, South Carolina which were converting to the A-10 Thunderbolt II. The aircraft had excellent accuracy with the aid of an automatic electronic navigation and weapons delivery system. Although designed primarily as a ground attack aircraft, it also had limited air-to-air combat capability. In 1980, the 125th received the new twin-seat A-7K trainer and also received the Low Altitude Night Attack modification to the A-7D.

=== Modern era ===
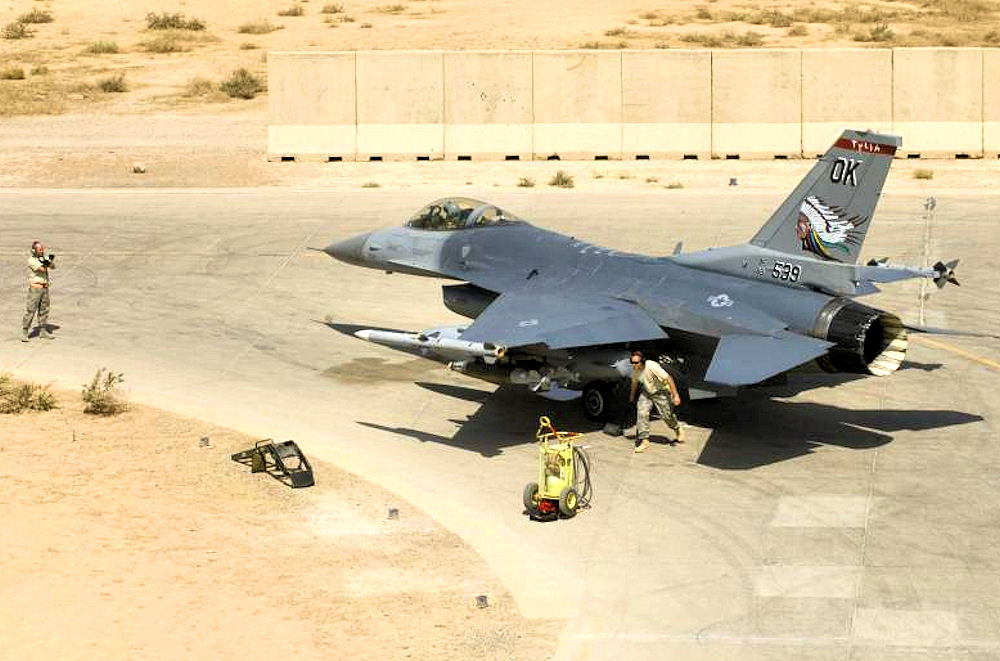
125th Expeditionary Fighter Squadron - General Dynamics F-16C Block 42D Fighting Falcon, AF Ser. No. 88-0539, prepares to take off from Balad AB, Iraq, on 30 Sep 2008.

Early in the 1990s with the declared end of the Cold War and the continued decline in military budgets, the Air Force restructured to meet changes in strategic requirements, decreasing personnel, and a smaller infrastructure. The 138th adopted the new USAF "Objective Organization" in early 1992, with the word "tactical" being eliminated from its designation and becoming the 138th Fighter Group. Tactical Air Command was inactivated on 1 June, being replaced by the new Air Combat Command (ACC).

The 125th Fighter Squadron flew A-7Ds until 1993 when it began to receive Block 42 F-16C/D Fighting Falcons, replacing the venerable A-7D in the attack roles. Most of these aircraft came from the 51st Fighter Wing, Osan Air Base, South Korea and the 363d Fighter Wing, Shaw AFB, South Carolina, which were trading in Block 42s for more advanced F-16s. The 125th, although an Air National Guard unit, which were mostly tasked with air defense of US mainland, was tasked with a conventional attack mission. This was already the case in the A-7D and even in the F-100 era. The squadron was one of the first Air National Guard units to be equipped with the Low Altitude Navigation and Targeting Infrared for Night, or LANTIRN system to be able to illuminate their own ground targets. At the time of conversion this unit was one of the most advanced within the Air National Guard.

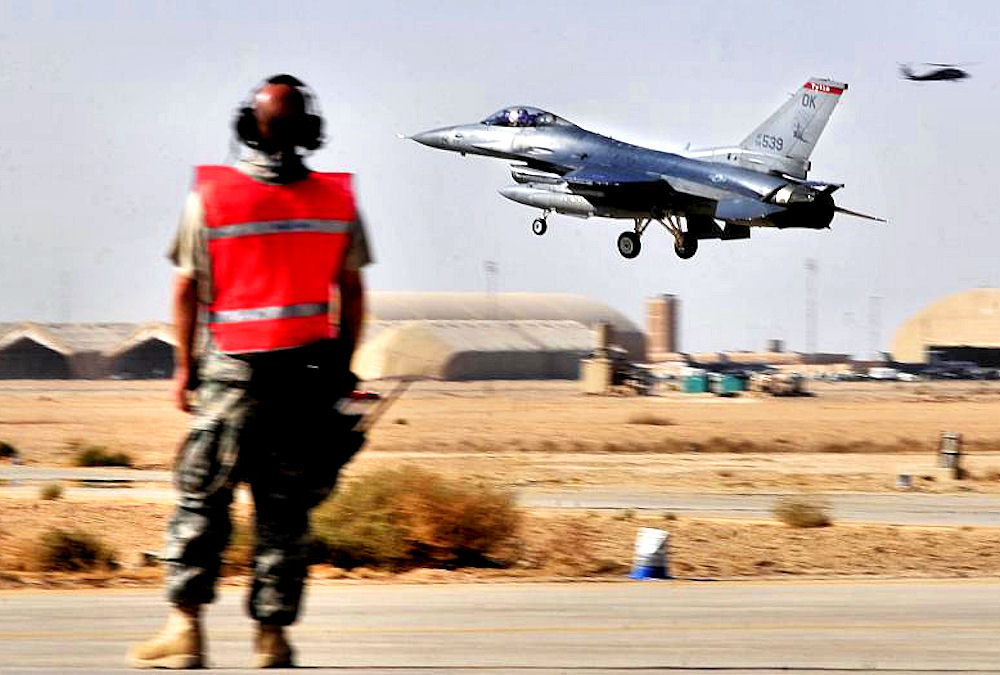
125th Expeditionary Fighter Squadron—General Dynamics F-16C Block 42D Fighting Falcon, AF Ser. No. 88-0539. arrives in Iraq on 4 Oct 2011. The squadron deployed in support of Operation New Dawn.

In mid-1996, the Air Force, in response to budget cuts, and changing world situations, began experimenting with Air Expeditionary organizations. The Air Expeditionary Force (AEF) concept was developed that would mix Active Duty Regular Air Force, Air Force Reserve, and Air National Guard elements into a combined force. Instead of entire permanent units deploying as "Provisional" as in the 1991 Gulf War, Expeditionary units are composed of "aviation packages" from several wings, including the active duty Air Force, the Air Force Reserve Command, and the Air National Guard, would be married together to carry out the assigned deployment rotation.

In October 1996, the 125th Expeditionary Fighter Squadron was first formed from 138th FW personnel and aircraft and deployed to Incirlik Air Base, Turkey, to join with other active-duty and national guard squadrons as part of Operation Northern Watch. This mission was part of a multi-unit Air National Guard "rainbow" deployment involving the Air National Guard block 42 F-16 squadrons. Each squadron provided eight aircraft to a total of 24 aircraft deployed. The 125th returned to Tulsa and was inactivated on 7 January 1997. Further Northern Watch activations of the 125th EFS and subsequent deployments to Incirlik AB occurred in the spring of 1998 and fall of 2001.

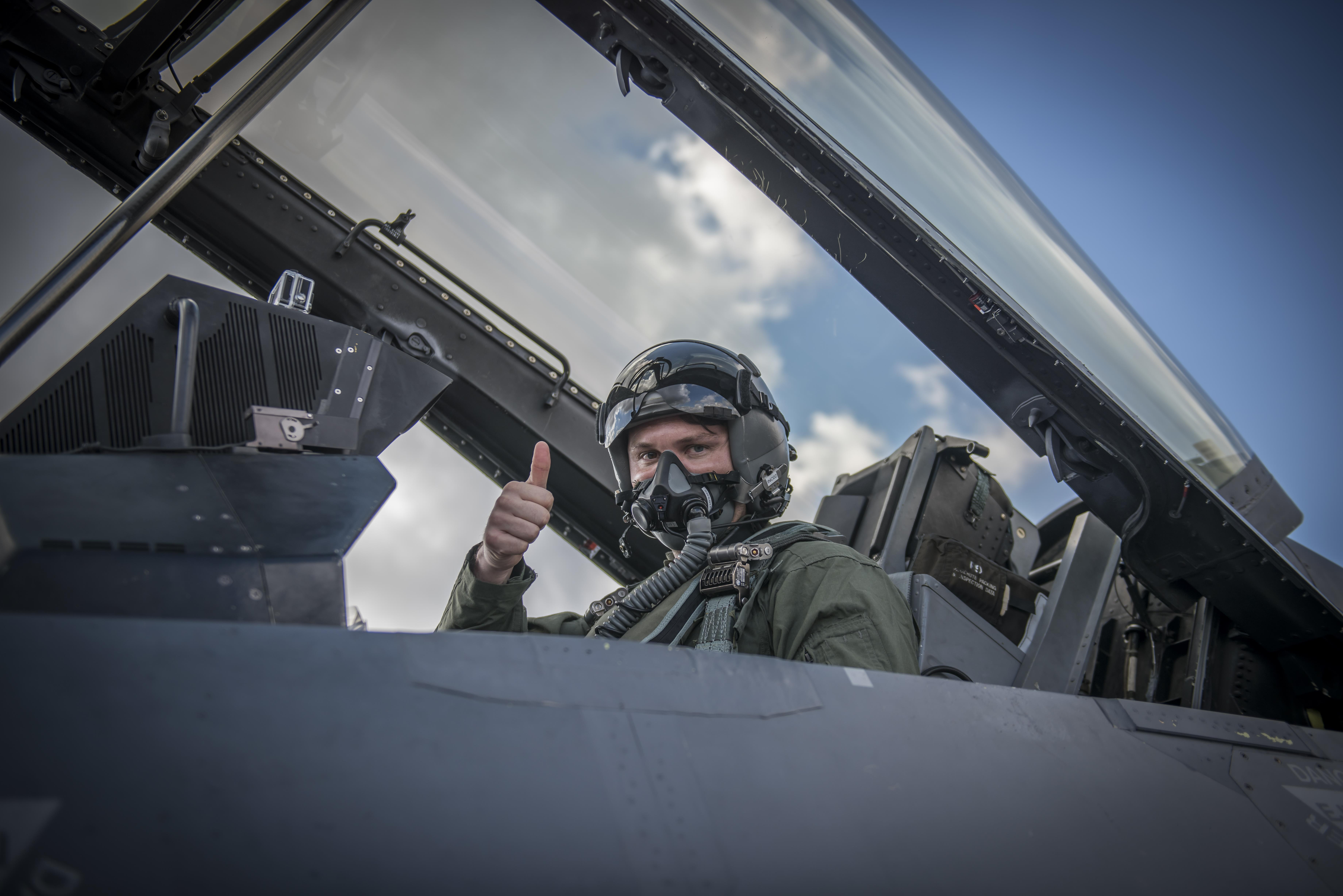
Pete Hegseth in a 138th Fighter Wing F-16 Fighting Falcon, 2017

The 125th Expeditionary Fighter Squadron has also been deployed to Al Jaber Air Base, Kuwait for Operation Southern Watch in 2001, and to Balad Air Base, Iraq in 2007 and 2008 as part of Operation Iraqi Freedom. In 2011, the 125th EFS deployed to Al Assad, Iraq for the final time to support Operation New Dawn, when more than 200 members deployed there to provide air support to the final drawdown of U.S. and coalition forces, being able to respond quickly to any needs troops in combat may have as they left the country. In 2013, the 125th EFS deployed to Kandahar AB as part of Operation Enduring Freedom. In 2018 the squadron returned to Bagram AB, Afghanistan in support of Operation Freedom's Sentinel and Operation Resolute Support.

== Lineage ==
138th Military Airlift Group

- Established as the 138th Fighter Group (Air Defense), and allotted to the Air National Guard in 1957

Activated and extended federal recognition on 1 August 1957
Redesignated 138th Air Transport Group On 15 January 1960 (Note: on 20 June 1962, the Air Force directed the unit to be redesignated the 138th Combat Airlift Group effective 1 July 1962. It revoked this action on 28 June 1962. AFOMO Letter, 837m, 20 June 1962 Subject: Redesignation of the Headquarters 133d Air Transport Wing, Heavy, and Certain Other USAF Units; AFOMO Letter, 856m, 28 June 1962 Subject: Revocation of Certain DAF AFOMO Letters.)
Redesignated 138th Military Airlift Group on 1 January 1966
Inactivated on 24 January 1973
Consolidated with the 138th Tactical Fighter Group on 17 August 1987

138th Fighter Wing
Established as the 138th Tactical Fighter Group in 1972
Activated on 25 January 1973
Consolidated with the 138th Military Airlift Group on 17 August 1987
Redesignated 138th Fighter Group on 15 March 1992
Redesignated 138th Fighter Wing on 1 October 1995

=== Assignments ===
- Oklahoma Air National Guard, 1 August 1957 – present

Gained by: Central Air Defense Force, Air Defense Command
Gained by: Oklahoma City Air Defense Sector, Air Defense Command, 1 January 1960
Gained by: Western Transport Air Force, (WESTAF), Military Air Transport Service, 15 January 1960
Gained by: Twenty-Second Air Force, Military Airlift Command, 8 January 1966
Gained by: Tactical Air Command, 25 January 1973
Gained by: Air Combat Command, 1 June 1992-Present

=== Components ===
- 138th Operations Group, 1 October 1995 – present
- 125th Fighter-Interceptor Squadron (later 125th Air Transport Squadron, 125th Military Airlift Squadron, 125th Tactical Fighter Squadron, 125th Fighter Squadron, 1 August 1957 – 24 January 1973, 15 January 1973 – 1 October 1995

=== Stations ===
- Tulsa Municipal Airport, Oklahoma, 1 August 1957
- Tulsa International Airport, 28 August 1963

Designated Tulsa Air National Guard Base, 1991–present

=== Aircraft ===
- F-86D Sabre Interceptor, 1957–1959
- F-86L Sabre Interceptor, 1959–1960
- C-97G Stratofreighter, 1960–1968
- C-124C Globemaster II, 1968–1973
- F-100D/F Super Sabre, 1973–1978
- A-7D/K Corsair II, 1978–1993
- Block 42 F-16C/D Fighting Falcon, 1993–present

=== Decorations ===
- Air Force Outstanding Unit Award
