= James McIntyre =

James, Jim, or Jimmy McIntyre may refer to:

== Arts and entertainment ==
- James McIntyre (poet) (1828–1906), Canadian poet
- James McIntyre (theatrical actor) (1857–1937), American minstrel performer
- Jim McIntyre (musician), American musician

== Law and politics ==
- James P. McIntyre (1883–1957), Canadian politician
- James Gordon McIntyre, Lord Sorn (1896–1983), Scottish judge
- Laurence McIntyre (a.k.a. Jim McIntyre, 1912–1981), Australian diplomat
- James M. McIntyre (1918–1991), American politician in Pennsylvania
- James L. McIntyre (1926–2015), Canadian politician in Ontario
- James McIntyre (politician) (1930–1984), American politician in Massachusetts
- James A. McIntyre (1938–2020), American lawyer

== Sports ==
- James McIntyre (footballer) (1863–1943), Scottish footballer, a.k.a. "Tuck McIntyre"
- Jimmy McIntyre (1877–1959), English footballer and team manager
- Jim McIntyre (basketball) (1927–2005), American college basketball player
- Len McIntyre (James Leonard McIntyre, 1933–2012), English rugby player
- Jim McIntyre (footballer) (born 1972), Scottish footballer
- Jim McIntyre (bowls), Scottish lawn and indoor bowler

== Others ==
- James McIntyre (soldier) (1875–1930), American soldier
- James Francis McIntyre (1886–1979), American prelate of the Roman Catholic Church
- James T. McIntyre (born 1940), American economist

== See also ==
- James McIntire (disambiguation)
