= Park Aerospace Corp =

American communications manufacturing company

Park Electrochemical Corp
- Type: Public
- Traded as: NYSE: PKE
- Industry: Semiconductor Equipment & Materials
- Founded: 1954
- Headquarters: Melville, New York, United States
- Area served: Worldwide
- Key people: Brian E. Shore (Chief Executive Officer, President, and Exec. Chairman) P. Matthew Farabaugh (Chief Financial Officer, Principal Accounting Officer and VP) Christopher T. Mastrogiacomo (Chief Operating Officer and Exec. VP) (December, 2013)
- Products: digital and radio frequency(RF)/microwave printed circuit material products, composite materials
- Revenue: ▲$73.41M (2014.1.30)
- Number of employees: 535(2013.12)
- Website: parkaerospace.com

Park Electrochemical Corp, now called the Park Aerospace Corp, is a Melville, New York-based materials manufacturer for the telecommunications, Internet infrastructure, high-end computing, and aerospace industries. It produces high-technology digital and radio frequency(RF)/microwave printed circuit material products, composite materials. Its printed circuit materials are used for complex multilayer printed circuit boards and other electronic interconnection systems, such as multilayer back-planes, wireless packages, high-speed/low-loss multilayers, and high density interconnects (HDIs). Its core capabilities are polymer chemistry formulation and coating technology.

== History ==
Park Electrochemical Corp was founded in 1954 by Jerry Shore and Tony Chiesa.

In 1957 Park developed epoxy-glass copper-clad laminates for use in making printed circuit boards.

During the 1960s and 70s, the company invented a multilayer laminate printed circuit materials system. It also opened two more Nelco materials subsidiaries.

During the 1980s and 90s, the company extended its product lines to vacuum lamination, multilayer facility and RF/Microwave. It also enlarged its product markets, established subsidiaries in many countries, such as FiberCote Industries, Inc. and Park Advanced Composite Materials, Inc.

From 2000, Park completed a series of global acquisitions and expansions and entered the aerospace market. It sold its Nelco Technology Inc. and acquired Nova Composites, Inc. In 2003, Park and Snecma Propulsion Systems signed an agreement to let Park market SPS’s Raycarb C2 carbonized rayon fabric to manufacturers of rocket motors.

In February, 2013, Isola USA Corp and Park settled a patents dispute over Styrene Maleic Anhydride (SMA) in laminates. Both companies agreed to dismiss a 2012 patent infringement lawsuit filed against Park by Isola. Park agreed to refrain from challenging the validity or enforceability of any of Isola’s SMA patents.

In July of 2026, Park announced a new composites manufacturing facility at Tulsa International Airport. The $65 million, 18-acre installation is expected to be completed in 2028.

== Products ==
There are four main product lines in Park Electrochemical corporation, namely Advanced Composite Materials (for aircraft structures, interiors and radomes. broadgoods, tapes), Nelco Digital Electronic Materials (for multilayer designs), Nelco RF/Microwave Materials, and Advanced Composite Parts (Lightweight assemblies for aerospace applications.). The Company’s products include high-speed, low-loss, engineered formulations, high-temperature modified epoxies, phenolics, polyimides, polyphenylene ethers Signal Integrity (SI) products.

== Research and development ==
Aug 12, 2013,Park Electrochemical Corp introduced its new NL9000 RF/Microwave electronics materials products with a dissipation factor (“Df”) of 0.0017 at 10 GHz using stripline testing methodology and a 0.5 dB/cm attenuation loss at 77 GHz for microstrip automotive radar applications. The new series meets UL 94V-0 and IPC-4103 specifications and are RoHS compliant.

July 22, 2013, After its successful applications of SIGMA STRUT, Park introduced ALPHA STRUT, new proprietary composite strut design for aircraft and other aerospace applications. These two technologies improve weight savings and load carrying reliability.

In May, 2013, the company's Sigma Strut was selected by Northrop Grumman for use on the James Webb Space Telescope (JWST).
