= Tulsa International Airport =

Airport serving Tulsa, Oklahoma, U.S.

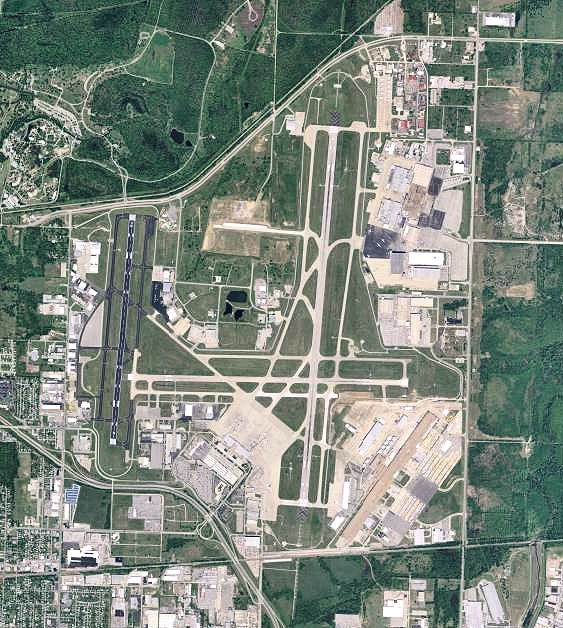
- IATA: TUL; ICAO: KTUL; FAA LID: TUL

Summary
- Airport type: Public/military
- Owner: City of Tulsa
- Operator: Tulsa Airport Authority
- Location: Tulsa, Oklahoma, U.S.
- Hub for: Omni Air International
- Elevation AMSL: 677 ft (206 m)
- Coordinates: 36°11′54″N 95°53′17″W
- Website: flytulsa.com

Maps
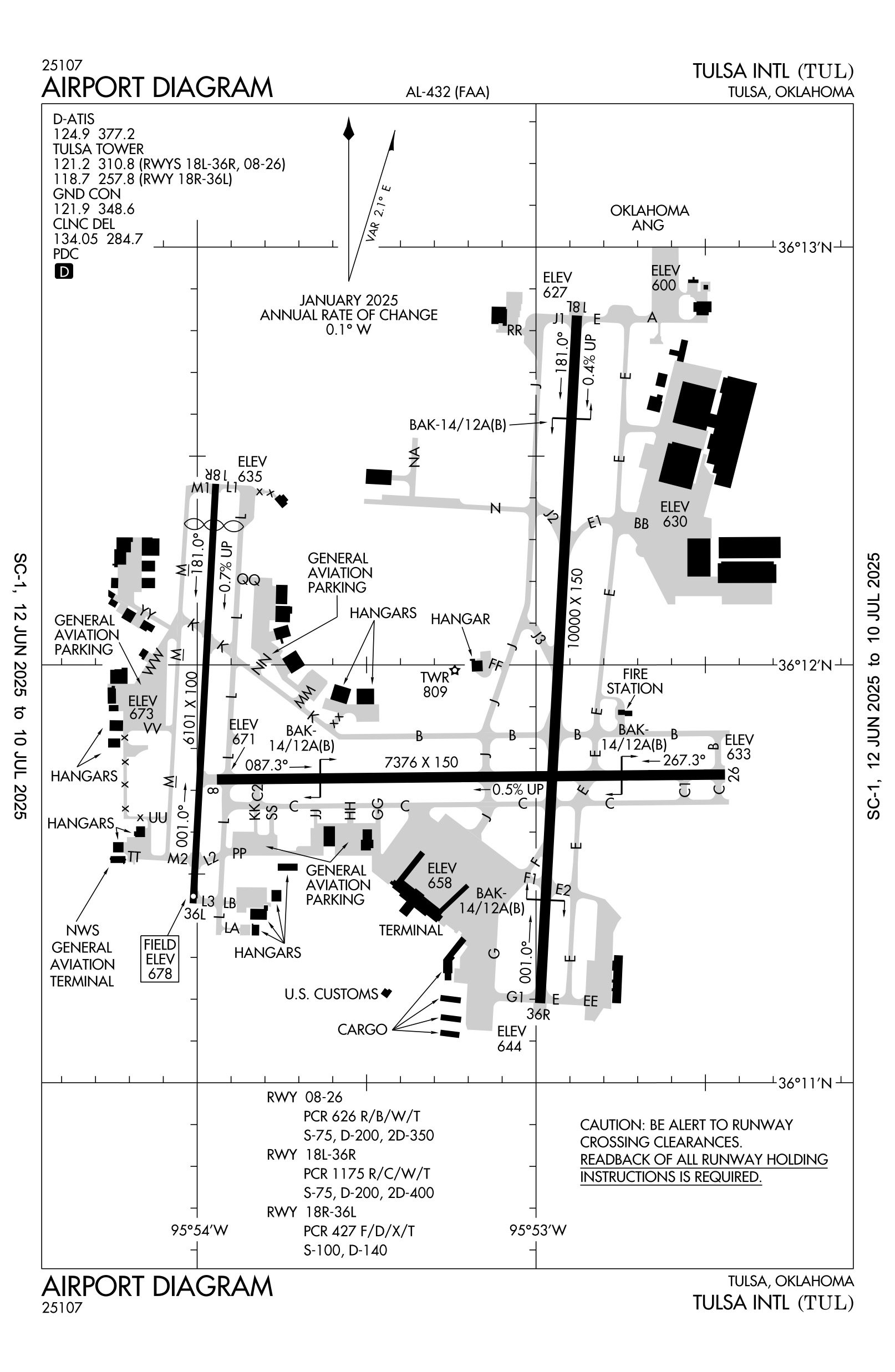
- FAA diagram
- Interactive map of Tulsa International Airport

Runways
Direction	Length		Surface
Direction	ft	m	Surface
18L/36R	10,000	3,048	Concrete
18R/36L	6,101	1,860	Asphalt
8/26	7,376	2,248	Concrete

Statistics (2025)
- Aircraft operations: 107,131
- Total Passengers: 3,190,090 ▼1.77%
- Total cargo (lbs.): 80,799,759
- Source: Federal Aviation Administration,

Tulsa International Airport (IATA: TUL, ICAO: KTUL, FAA LID: TUL) is a civil-military airport five miles (8 km) northeast of Downtown Tulsa, in Tulsa County, Oklahoma, United States. It was named Tulsa Municipal Airport when the city acquired it in 1929; it received its present name in 1963. It includes a 45,000-square-foot Customs facility, which allows direct commercial international flights starting with Mexico.

The 138th Fighter Wing of the Oklahoma Air National Guard is based at the co-located Tulsa Air National Guard Base. The airport is also the global maintenance headquarters for American Airlines.

During World War II Air Force Plant No. 3 was built on the southeast side of the airport, and Douglas Aircraft manufactured several types of aircraft there. After the war this facility was used by Douglas (later McDonnell Douglas) and Rockwell International (later Boeing) for aircraft manufacturing, modification, repair, and research. Spirit AeroSystems currently builds commercial airline parts for Boeing aircraft in part of the building and IC Bus Corporation assembles school buses in the other part. Spirit AeroSystems also builds Boeing wing and floor beam parts and Gulfstream wing parts in a facility on the east side of the airport, just north of runway 26.

The Tulsa Air and Space Museum is on the northwest side of the airport.

== History ==
Duncan A. McIntyre, an early aviator and native of New Zealand, moved to Tulsa in 1919. His first airport was located at Apache and Memorial and opened August 22, 1919. He moved and established a private airport on an 80-acre tract at the corner of Admiral Place and Sheridan Avenue. McIntyre Field had three hangars to house 40 aircraft and a beacon for landings after sundown.

McIntyre evidently closed his airport during the 1930s and merged it with R. F. Garland, a Tulsa oil man and owner of the Garland Airport at 51st and Sheridan Road for $350,000. He ran the airport and became the president of the new venture. This airport would later become the Brown Airport (after a number of owners and names including the commercial airport before it moved to 61st and Yale). In 1940, McIntyre accepted a position with Lockheed Corporation and moved to California.

Charles Lindbergh landed at McIntyre Field on September 30, 1927. He had been persuaded to visit Tulsa by William G. Skelly, who was then president of the local Chamber of Commerce, as well as a booster of the young aviation industry. In addition to being a wealthy oilman and founder of Skelly Oil Company, Skelly founded Spartan Aircraft Company. Lindbergh had already landed at Oklahoma City Municipal Airport, Bartlesville Municipal Airport and Muskogee's Hatbox Field. All of these were superior to the privately owned McIntyre Field. Lindbergh pointed this out at a banquet given that night in his honor.

=== Opening ===
The initial municipal airport was financed with a so-called "stud horse note", a promissory note like those used by groups of farmers or horse breeders who would collectively underwrite the purchase of a promising stud horse. The note would be retired with the stud fees paid for use of the horse. In the case of the Tulsa airport, the note would be paid from airport fees. Using this vehicle, Skelly obtained signatures from several prominent Tulsa businessmen who put up $172,000 to buy 390 acres (160 hectares) for a municipal airport. It opened July 3, 1928. The city of Tulsa purchased the airport, then named Tulsa Municipal Airport, in 1929, and put its supervision under the Tulsa Park Board. Charles W. Short was appointed Airport Director in 1929, and remained in this position until 1955.

The first terminal building was a one-story wood and tar paper structure that looked like a warehouse. The landing strips and taxiways were mown grass. Still, it handled enough passengers in 1930 for Tulsa to claim that it had the busiest airport in the world. The Tulsa Municipal Airport handled 7,373 passengers in February 1930 and 9,264 in April. This outpaced Croydon Airport, Berlin Tempelhof Airport, and Paris Le Bourget Airport for those months. Braniff Airways stopped at Tulsa on its original route between Chicago and Wichita Falls, and TWA stopped at Tulsa on its original route between Columbus and Los Angeles. Later in the 1930s, Tulsa became a stop on the American Airlines Chicago-Dallas route.

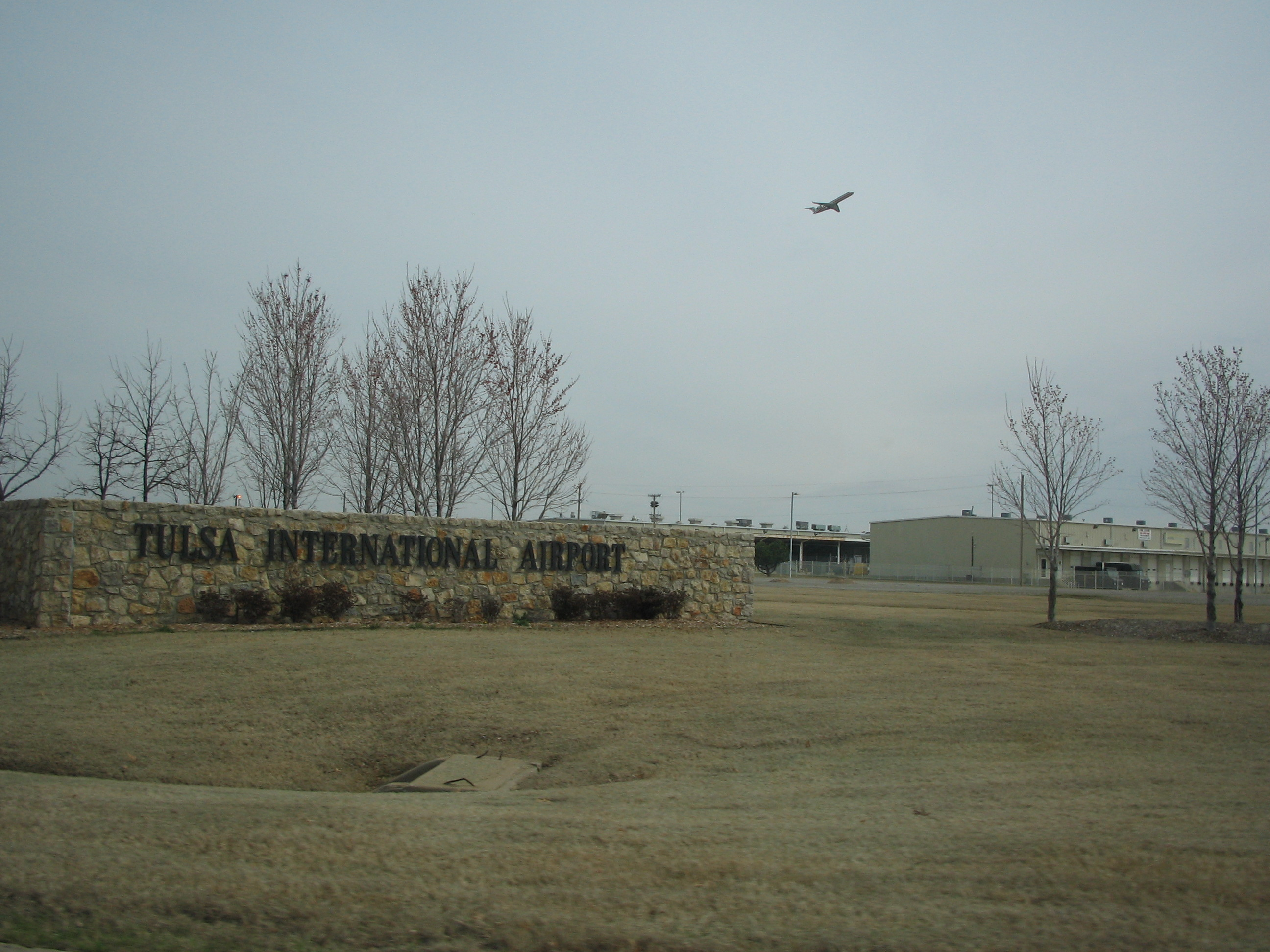
Tulsa International Airport entrance, 2007; photo by Luis Tamayo

In 1932 the city opened a more elegant Art Deco terminal topped with a control tower, designed by Frederick V. Kershner, a lead architect working for Leon B. Senter. The structure was masonry with rounded corners, resulting in a futuristic appearance. Charles Short decorated the inside walls with a collection of early aviation photographs.

Although many Tulsans had concluded that the 1932 terminal was inadequate to serve the rapidly-growing city by the mid-1950s, the 1932 building served until Tulsa had to construct a new terminal, east of the old facility. The new terminal would be designed by noted architect Robert Lawton Jones, who later said that his design was inspired by Mies van der Rohe (Note: Jones, a principal of the design firm Murray Jones Murray, had previously moved to Tulsa to oversee the firm's work on the new Tulsa Civic Center.) Terminal design work began in November 1958 and the completed building opened November 16, 1961; on August 28, 1963, the facility was renamed Tulsa International Airport. The 1932 terminal was demolished in 1969 to make way for a runway expansion project. In January 1928 Skelly bought the Mid-Continent Aircraft Company of Tulsa and renamed it the Spartan Aircraft Company. It first built a two-seat biplane, the Spartan C3 at its facility near the new airport. Later it would also build a low-wing cabin monoplane as a corporate aircraft, and the NP-1, a naval training plane used in World War II. In 1929 Spartan established the Spartan School of Aeronautics across Apache street from the new Tulsa airport to train fliers and support personnel. The Spartan School was activated by the U. S. Army Air Corps (USAAC) on August 1, 1939, as an advanced civilian pilot training school to supplement the Air Corps' few flying training schools. The Air Corps supplied students with training aircraft, flying clothes, textbooks, and equipment. The Air Corps also put a detachment at each school to supervise training. Spartan furnished instructors, training sites and facilities, aircraft maintenance, quarters, and mess halls.

=== World War II ===
The 138th Fighter Wing of the Air National Guard was organized at the Tulsa Airport in 1940 as the 125th Observation Squadron, then renamed when it deployed overseas during World War II. It is still based at TUL.

On January 4, 1941, the War Department announced that Tulsa would be the site of a $15 million plant. The Federal Government built Air Force Plant No. 3 on the east side of the airport. The plant was operated by Douglas Aircraft Corporation to manufacture, assemble and modify bombers for the USAAF from 1942 to 1945; production was suspended when World War II ended.

=== Postwar ===
In 1946 American Airlines acquired two former Air Force hangars to start a maintenance and engineering base at Tulsa Municipal Airport. In 1947, when transcontinental flights made at least one stop, American had nonstops from Tulsa to San Francisco and Los Angeles.

Air Force Plant No. 3 was reactivated in 1950 to produce the Boeing B-47 Stratojet and later the Douglas B-66 Destroyer.

The April 1957 OAG shows 20 weekday departures on American, 18 Braniff, 6 Continental, 6 Central and 4 TWA. American had a DC-7 nonstop to New York, but westward nonstops didn't get past Oklahoma City, Wichita and Dallas.

In the late 1960s McDonnell Douglas, the successor to Douglas Aircraft Corporation, continued to use Air Force Plant No. 3 for aircraft maintenance. Rockwell International leased part of the plant to manufacture aerospace products.

In 1967 the Tulsa Airports Improvement Trust (TAIT) was established as a public trust to build, operate, and maintain airport facilities for the city of Tulsa. TAIT has no authority to levy taxes and depends on airport revenues to repay airport-related debts. TAIT is independent of the city, but all board members are appointed by the Mayor of Tulsa and confirmed by the City Council. In October 1978 TAIT leased Tulsa International Airport and other city aviation facilities (other than police and fire heliports) to the city of Tulsa acting through the Tulsa Airport Authority (TAA), which agreed to disburse all airport-related income to TAIT. In 1979 the airport was also served by Frontier Airlines, Scheduled Skyways and Texas International Airlines. In July 1989, a lease amendment gave daily airport operation and maintenance responsibility to the TAA.

McDonnell Douglas terminated its lease of Air Force Plant No. 3 in 1996. Boeing bought Rockwell International's aerospace business in 1996, and took over much of the facility for aerospace manufacturing.

The Tulsa Air and Space Museum (TASM) was established in 1998 on the northwest side of the airport. The museum added the James E. Bertelsmeyer Tulsa planetarium in 2006.

In December 2000 TAIT guaranteed a loan to Great Plains Airlines in cooperation with the Tulsa Industrial Authority (TIA), the Bank of Oklahoma and the city of Tulsa. The TIA mortgaged Air Force Plant No. 3 for $30 million, which was loaned to Great Plains, and TAIT agreed to purchase the property if the airline defaulted. Great Plains went bankrupt in January 2004 and was unable to repay $7.1 million of the loan, but the loan guarantee was deemed to violate Federal Aviation Administration (FAA) policies prohibiting an airport authority from subsidizing a particular airline, and when the Bank of Oklahoma tried in June 2004 to collect the debt, TAIT declined to purchase the property from the TIA. The TIA promptly sued TAIT for violating the agreement and later added the city of Tulsa to the lawsuit in June 2008. The parties tried to settle the suit in August 2008 by repaying the TIA with $7.1 million of city funds, but this was challenged by a taxpayer group in a qui tam action, and the settlement was deemed illegal in October 2011 by the Oklahoma Supreme Court. The TIA and the Bank of Oklahoma then sued TAIT for breach of contract in March 2013, seeking $15.6 million ($7.1 million in 2004 plus interest). The dispute was finally settled on 31 August 2015 with TAIT agreeing to pay $1.56 million to the TIA and the Bank of Oklahoma's parent company and $125,000 to the Tulsa Regional Chamber.

=== 2010-Pre COVID-19 ===
Allegiant Air began service in 2013 to Orlando/Sanford. In 2015 Allegiant also began service to Las Vegas, Los Angeles International Airport, and St. Petersburg/Clearwater in 2015. TUL also saw a completed terminal renovation in 2015. Allegiant Air has had routes come and go such as New Orleans, Baltimore, and Nashville. Frontier Airlines returned once again in 2018 after pulling out of TUL a decade prior and began year-round service to Denver International Airport. Frontier also has been a victim of short lived routes in this timeframe such as Washington Dulles, San Jose (CA), Orlando, and San Diego. Former Regional Carrier Via Air served TUL with nonstop service to Austin from 2018 to 2019. American Airlines reunited year-round service to Los Angeles in April 2019 after the route was cut in the late 2000s. Allegiant Air began seasonal service to Destin/Fort Walton Beach in June 2019. During this time frame Runway construction took place along with the return of a jet bridge to gate B9 for Frontier's return.

=== COVID-19 ===
COVID-19 affected TUL like any other airport during the timeframe. New service on Allegiant Air to San Diego and Nashville along with a new Southwest Airlines seasonal service to Baltimore were all slated to start in the summer of 2020. Nashville was attempted but did poorly as expected considering the circumstance. Ultimately, the route was cut in August 2020. Tulsa International Airport rebounded very well from COVID-19 thus leading to many new routes and aircraft upgrades. The first began with American Airlines adding nonstop service to Phoenix Sky Harbor in November 2020 to attract leisure travel, this route was very successful, therefore, the route turned into a year-round service just a few months after flights began. Startup low-cost carrier Breeze Airways began service to TUL as the airport scored Breeze as one of their first 15 cities with nonstop service to New Orleans, San Antonio, and Tampa, flights began in the summer of 2021. American Airlines began a surge at Tulsa International Airport adding four new destinations within one year, nearly doubling their network with new services to Austin, Miami, New York–LaGuardia, and Washington–National. This was huge for TUL as many unserved markets were reunited at long last. Unfortunately, Tulsa did have some miscues to complement the new services. Breeze Airways discontinued service to New Orleans and San Antonio in November 2021. Allegiant Air also attempted service to Austin but was unsuccessful as the route was discontinued a little over a month after beginning. Allegiant Air began new seasonal service to Phoenix/Mesa and Sarasota in November and December 2021 respectively. Southwest Airlines launched two new routes for the first time in four years with service to Austin to complement American Airlines and the return of Chicago–Midway as Southwest served MDW till 2015 from Tulsa. Breeze Airways launched non-stop service to Nashville in June 2022 and will add Orlando in March 2023.

== Facilities ==
The airport covers 4,360 acres (1,764 ha) and has three paved runways:

- 18L/36R: 10,000 ft × 200 ft (3,048 m × 61 m), surface: grooved concrete
- 18R/36L: 6,101 ft × 100 ft (1,860 m × 30 m), surface: grooved asphalt
- 8/26: 7,376 ft × 150 ft (2,248 m × 46 m), surface: grooved concrete

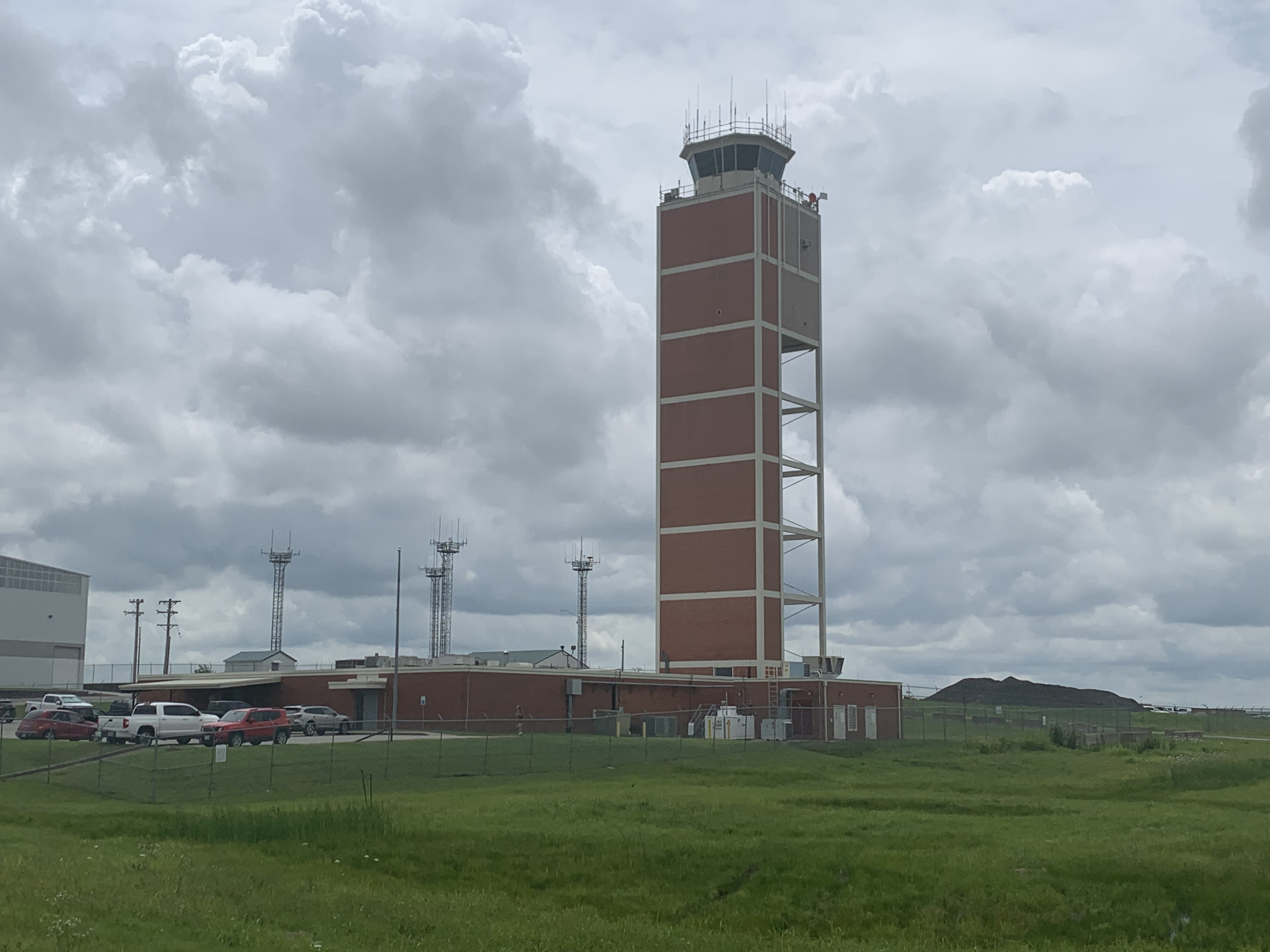
Control tower at Tulsa International Airport, June 2021

=== Terminals ===
The airport has a smaller regional terminal with newly renovated concourses. Concourse A, which houses Alaska, Allegiant, American and Delta, has 11 departure gates: A1 through A11. Currently, seven of those are in use. Concourse B, opened in 2012, has 11 departure gates: B1 through B11. Of those, eight are currently in use. Southwest and United use Concourse B.

In 2010, a renovation of the 1960s-era terminal began. The renovations were designed by Gensler and Benham Companies. Concourse B (home to Southwest and United) underwent a $17.9 million renovation between September 7, 2010 and January 18, 2012, including major HVAC replacement along with the more noticeable design changes. These changes include sky lights and raising the somewhat low ceilings in the concourse area, improved passenger waiting areas and gate redesigns. Concourse A (home to Alaska, Allegiant, Delta, American and US Airways before its merger with American) subsequently underwent renovation and upgrades which were completed in 2015.

=== American Airlines Maintenance Facility ===
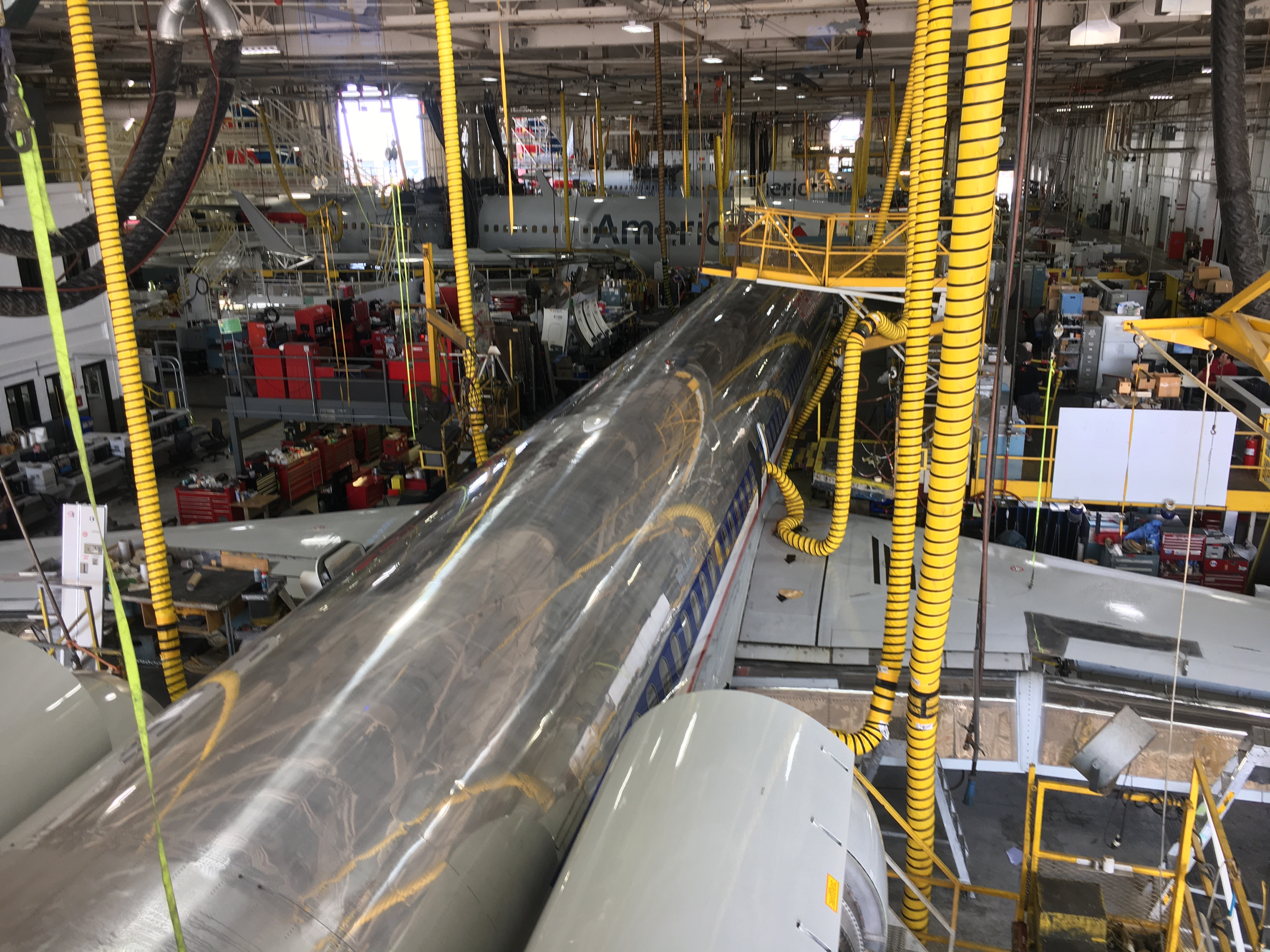
A hangar for single aisle aircraft repair at the American Airlines Maintenance Base at Tulsa International Airport. An MD-80 being worked on next to a Boeing 737

TUL is the headquarters for all Maintenance and Engineering activities at American Airlines worldwide, (Note: American Airlines uses the acronym MRO to designate this facility.) and is the maintenance base for the airline's fleet of Airbus A320 family, Boeing 787 and Boeing 737 aircraft – a combined total of nearly 800 airplanes. It is the largest commercial aircraft maintenance base in the world. It employs over 5,000 people, with the majority as licensed aircraft and jet engine mechanics. According to the company, it is also one of the largest private employers in Oklahoma.

While many other major domestic airlines (e.g., United, Northwest and US Air) were closing their maintenance facilities and outsourcing the work to major contractors in the early 2000s, American consolidated these activities at the MRO. The airline vowed to make the center as cost-effective as private centers and attract some of this work from other airlines as well. AA won major cost concessions from its own employees, pledged to relocate all its Boeing 737 heavy maintenance work to Tulsa, along with its work on the GE CFM-56 engine work. It also contains a wheel-and-brake overhaul facility and composite repair center. AA received $22 million in funding from Tulsa's Vision 2025 program that helped it buy machines, tooling and test equipment that only original-equipment manufacturers previously had. This funding helped it get contracts for maintenance work from Synergy Aerospace for F100 aircraft; Aeroserve, for JT8 engine work; GE Aviation Materials, for work on CF6-80 engines; Omni Air International and Vulcan Flight Management for work on Boeing 757 aircraft; and Aero Union for work on A300 landing gear.

The MRO occupies about 260 acres (1.1 km^{2}) and 3,300,000 square feet (310,000 m^{2}) of maintenance "plant" at the Tulsa Airport. Each year, the base performs major overhaul work on about 80% of American's fleet. It also does aircraft maintenance for other carriers on a contract basis.

On 28 February 2020, American Airlines announced an investment of half billion US dollars for the MRO base that will include two new hangars, including a 193,000-square-foot facility big enough to hold six narrow-body planes, such as a Boeing 737, or two larger planes.

=== Lufthansa Technik Component Services ===
Lufthansa Technik Component Services LLC (LTCS), a subsidiary of Lufthansa Technik AG, is headquartered at Tulsa Airport. LTCS provides maintenance, repair and overhaul (MRO) services to airlines. The Tulsa location includes the departments of Production and Product Development Engineering, the department of Finance and Controlling as well as Human Resources Management, Strategic Purchasing and a Customer Service team. At the time of an October, 2026 hangar renovation which saw the addition of 18 work bays, the company had more than 500,000 square feet (46,000 m^{2}) of hangar space spread across four hangars.

=== Quantum Space ===
In May, 2026, construction was announced of a parts manufacturing facility for the company Quantum Space, to be located in the Spartan Building, being one of the original hangars for the airport. This will become Quantum’s primary site for production of precision spacecraft parts, as well as large propulsion tanks.

=== Park Aerospace ===
In July of 2026, Park Aerospace Corp announced a new composites manufacturing facility at TIA. The $65 million, 18-acre installation is expected to be completed in 2028.

=== Agile Space Industries ===
Agile Space Industries announced construction of the Tulsa Space Test Center in July of 2026, said facility being for the testing of rocket engines. Officials anticipated this to be the center of a Tulsa Space Park, being a magnet for other industries.

=== Federal Inspection Services–General Aviation Facility ===
In May 2026, a new $42 million, 45,000-square-foot Customs building, technically the Federal Inspection Services–General Aviation Facility, opened at the airport replacing an existing 1,200-square-foot Customs and Border Protection office. Direct commercial international flights to Mexico started the same month.

== Public transportation ==
MetroLink Tulsa operates public transport service to the main terminal via Route 201470 - Garnett | Routes in Service Monday through Saturday, with 45 minute frequency on weekdays and 65 minute frequency on Saturdays.

=== Departures / arrivals ===
Although generally single-level, the entry section of the airport has separate departure and arrival curbs; the inner Apache Drive for departures and outer Airport Drive for arrivals. Baggage claim carousels are located on Airport Drive on the Arrival upper-level curb. TIA has six baggage carousels in service. Currently Alaska, Allegiant, American and Delta use carousels 1, 2, and 3. Southwest, United and Frontier use carousels 4, 5, and 6.

== Airlines and destinations ==
=== Passenger ===
Airlines	Destinations
Alaska Airlines	San Diego, Seattle/Tacoma
Allegiant Air	Las Vegas, Orlando/Sanford; Seasonal: Destin/Fort Walton Beach, St. Petersburg/Clearwater
American Airlines	Charlotte, Dallas/Fort Worth
American Eagle	Charlotte, Chicago–O'Hare, Dallas/Fort Worth, Los Angeles, Miami, New York–LaGuardia, Phoenix–Sky Harbor, Washington–National
Delta Air Lines	Atlanta
Delta Connection	Salt Lake City
Southwest Airlines	Austin, Chicago–Midway, Dallas–Love, Denver, Houston–Hobby, Las Vegas, Nashville, Orlando, Phoenix–Sky Harbor
United Airlines	Denver, Houston–Intercontinental
United Express	Chicago–O'Hare, Denver, Houston–Intercontinental

=== Destinations map ===
Continental United States Destinations
Destinations from Tulsa International Airport
Red = Year-round destination
Green = Seasonal destination

Mexico Destinations
Mexico destinations from Tulsa International Airport
Green = Seasonal destination

== Statistics ==
=== Top 10 destination airports ===
Busiest domestic routes from TUL (May 2025 – April 2026)
Rank	City	Passengers	Carriers
1	Dallas/Fort Worth, Texas	258,790	American
2	Denver, Colorado	205,300	Southwest, United
3	(Georgia (U.S. state)) Atlanta, Georgia	135,800	Delta
4	Houston–Intercontinental, Texas	126,650	United
5	Chicago–O'Hare, Illinois	121,840	American, United
6	Phoenix–Sky Harbor, Arizona	96,820	American, Southwest
7	Dallas–Love, Texas	94,000	Southwest
8	Las Vegas, Nevada	82,780	Allegiant, Southwest
9	Charlotte, North Carolina	79,060	American
10	Houston–Hobby, Texas	68,310	Southwest

Largest Airlines at TUL (May 2025 – April 2026)
Rank	Airline	Passengers	Share
1	Southwest Airlines	1,128,000	35.27%
2	American Airlines	531,000	16.62%
3	SkyWest Airlines	497,000	15.54%
4	Delta Air Lines	269,000	8.42%
5	Envoy Air	195,000	6.11%
	Other	577,000	18.04%

=== Annual traffic ===
Annual passenger traffic (enplaned + deplaned) at Tulsa International Airport (2007 – present)
Year	Passengers	Year	Passengers
2007	3,300,422	2017	2,865,824
2008	3,261,560	2018	3,048,357
2009	2,888,858	2019	3,053,532
2010	2,846,588	2020	1,332,433
2011	2,794,751	2021	2,316,751
2012	2,740,338	2022	2,887,560
2013	2,733,510	2023	3,144,567
2014	2,840,324	2024	3,247,670
2015	2,816,967	2025	3,190,090
2016	2,810,537		

== Non-aviation facilities ==
=== Industrial land development ===
In 2008, Tulsa Airport Authority began a new industrial land development project. Aerospace is one of Oklahoma's largest industry clusters with 400 companies that directly or indirectly employ more than 143,000 people with a payroll of $4.7 billion and an industrial output of $11.7 billion. Tulsa is ranked eighth nationally for the size of its aerospace engines manufacturing cluster and 20th for its defense-related cluster.

TUL's central location in the south is easily accessible by a multi-modal transportation network. With a total of 4,000 acres (16 km^{2}) and 14,000 on-airport employees, Tulsa is a large center of aviation activity. Six sites totaling over 700 acres (2.8 km^{2}) of real estate will be developed. Each of the sites can be divided into smaller lots to meet any organization's individual needs.

=== HP Enterprise Services building ===
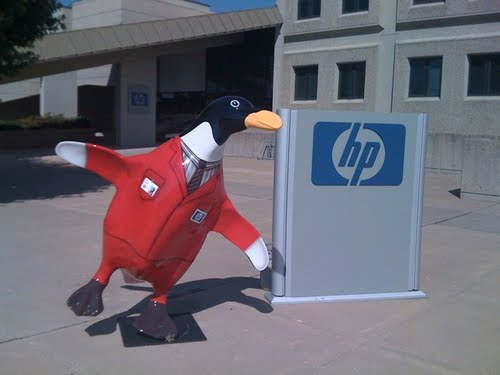
HP Penguin sculpture

The HP Enterprise Services (formerly EDS) building hosting some of Sabre's datacenter servers is located at the Tulsa Airport. The company applied a reflective material on the roof to reduce heat gain, thereby reducing the air conditioning power consumption. In front of this building is a 6-foot sculptured penguin, given to the company as part of a local art campaign by the Tulsa Zoo.

== Accidents and incidents ==
- June 10, 1950: a USAF Douglas C-47 lost power on takeoff and crashed into an aviation school barracks. Three men were injured, one fatally.
- January 6, 1957: American Airlines Flight 327, a Convair CV-240, struck trees 3.6 miles north of the airport and slid some 540 feet. One person was killed out of the 10 on board.
- January 8, 1965: The pilots of Central Airlines Flight 168, a Convair CV-240, diverted to Tulsa and performed an intentional belly landing after repeated unsuccessful attempts to lower the landing gear. The aircraft was substantially damaged but the nine passengers and three crew were not significantly injured.
- September 15, 1987: Eastern Air Lines Flight 216, a Boeing 727 carrying 55 passengers and 7 crew, was seriously damaged in a hard landing. The aircraft was inspected by mechanics at the American Airlines Tulsa maintenance base and cleared to fly; it was then flown to Kansas City and Chicago with passengers, only to be removed from service after skin wrinkles in the fuselage were noticed. An American Airlines official later said that the Tulsa mechanics erred in their inspection. The accident was attributed to the pilot's decision to disregard a hazardous weather advisory and land in severe winds.
- February 22, 1991: A Mitsubishi MU-2B-60, registration number N274MA, rolled over and crashed in a steep inverted dive after takeoff; the three occupants were killed. Investigators found the right-hand propeller feathered, the left spoiler deployed, and the rudder trim control in the neutral position; emergency procedures for the MU-2 dictated that after an engine is shut down, rudder trim should be applied "as soon as possible" to prevent spoiler deployment. The accident was attributed to the shutdown of one engine for unverified reasons, the failure of the pilot to maintain V_{MCA}, and the pilot's improper emergency procedure.
- December 28, 1992: A Beechcraft C24R Sierra, registration number N3809Q, struck trees during an Instrument Landing System approach at night in low visibility, killing the pilot and two passengers. The accident was attributed to "The pilot's disregard of and descent below the published decision height. Factors were his failure to maintain proper glide path and localizer alignment."
- November 25, 1994: UPS Airlines Flight 732, a Boeing 757-24APF, sustained severe structural damage in a tailstrike on landing. There were no injuries to the two pilots. The accident was attributed to the failure of the pilot to maintain V_{REF} and an improper landing flare. The aircraft was subsequently repaired and placed back in service.
- October 27, 1995: A Beechcraft B95 Travel Air, registration number N9943R, overran Runway 36L on takeoff and struck a tree and railroad tracks, killing the pilot and sole occupant. Investigators attributed the accident to the pilot's failure to remove the flight control gust locks during the preflight inspection, and the pilot's subsequent failure to abort the takeoff.
- July 10, 2010: A Cessna 421, registration number N88DF, experienced a double engine failure and crashed on approach, killing the two pilots and single passenger. The aircraft was low on fuel, but the pilot did not declare an emergency, and accepted a landing clearance on Runway 18R despite being significantly closer to 18L. The accident was attributed to "The pilot's inadequate preflight fuel planning and management in-flight, which resulted in total loss of engine power due to fuel exhaustion. Contributing to the accident was the pilot's use of performance-impairing medications."
