= Case presentation =

Formal communication between medical professionals

A case presentation is a formal communication between health care professionals such as doctors and nurses regarding a patient's clinical information.

Essential parts of a case presentation include:

- Identification
- Reason for consultation/admission
- Chief complaints (CC) - what made patients seek medical attention.
- History of present illness (HPI) - circumstances relating to chief complaints.
- Past medical history (PMHx)
- Past surgical history
- Current medications
- Allergies
- Family history (FHx)
- Social history (SocHx)
- Physical examination (PE)
- Laboratory results (Lab)
- Other investigations (imaging, biopsy etc.)
- Case summary and impression
- Management plans
- follow up in clinic or hospital
- Adherence of the patient to treatment
- success of the treatment or failure.
- causes of success or failure.

== See also ==
- Case report
- Case series
