= Donald MacIntyre =

Donald MacIntyre or McIntyre may refer to:

- Donald Macintyre (Indian Army officer) (1831–1903), recipient of the Victoria Cross
- Donald Macintyre (Royal Navy officer) (1904–1981), Royal Navy officer in World War II and author
- Donal MacIntyre (born 1966), investigative journalist
- Donald Macintyre (journalist), journalist and political commentator for The Independent
- Sir Donald MacIntyre (Rhodesian politician) (1891–1978), Rhodesian politician
- Sir Donald McIntyre (1934–2025), operatic bass-baritone from New Zealand
- Donald McIntyre (New South Wales politician) (1789/1790–1866), Scottish-Australian colonial politician
- Don McIntyre (1915–2013), Australian rules footballer
- Donald Macintyre, Scottish Gaelic poet and author of "Òran na Cloiche"
- Donald McIntyre (physician) (1891–1954), Scottish gynaecologist
- Donald McIntyre (Queensland politician) (1851–1927), member of the Queensland Legislative Assembly
