= Hilke MacIntyre =

German artist

Hilke MacIntyre is German artist living and working in St Andrews, Scotland. She grew up near Kiel and studied architecture there. MacIntyre's work includes lino cuts, prints and ceramics.

Her work has been exhibited in art festivals such as the Pittenweem Art Festival, used in promotions for the East Neuk Festival and sold in a range of contemporary art galleries, including Gallery Q in Dundee, Leeds Craft and Design Gallery, Edinburgh Printmakers and the Royal Scottish Academy .

Her work can be seen on packaging for the St Andrews based gin Eden Mill and on a range of flours for Doves Farm, and in situ at Waid Academy, Anstruther She is included in published themed collections such as The Printmakers's Cat' and the Edinburgh Art Book. MacIntyre has worked as an illustrator for poetry collections including The Tale of the Crail Whale: And Other Poems with Gordon Ian Jarvie and Ten Poems about Husbands and Wives for Candlestick Press.

In 2016 she was artist in residence at the Stanza Poetry Festival, an annual festival held in St Andrews each spring.

In early 2022. MacIntyre's work was included in Printmakers 2022 at Bircham Gallery in Holt.

She lives in Fife with her husband Ian MacIntyre who is also an artist.
