= Paul McIntyre =

Paul McIntyre may refer to:

- Paul McIntyre (footballer) (born 1987), Scottish footballer
- Paul McIntyre (politician) (born 1944), Canadian senator
- Paul McIntyre (scientist), American nanotechnologist
