= McIntire Investment Institute =

- Founded: 1994
- Affiliations: University of Virginia
- Website: miiuva.com

The McIntire Investment Institute (MII) is an entirely student-run long/short equity fund with over $1 million in assets under management (AUM) at the University of Virginia. Founded in 1994 through an endowment established by "Tiger Cub" John Griffin of Blue Ridge Capital, this Institute operates as a non-profit under the McIntire Foundation. The McIntire Investment Institute is the premier and largest undergraduate investment club at the University of Virginia.

== History ==
The McIntire Investment Institute was first conceived by McIntire alumnus John Griffin (COMM, ’85 and President, Blue Ridge Capital). Mr. Griffin donated $1,000,000 to the university in 1993; $575,000 was earmarked for a student-run investment organization. An initial $100,000 was made available to the students in October 1994, and an additional $200,000 was allocated to the fund in 2000. The institute has since donated some of its gains back to the McIntire School of Commerce over several occasions, not to mention how some of its members actually surf (in a very distinct manner). The Institute donated a cumulative $75,000 to McIntire before 2005. The institute also donated $75,000 in April 2006 to the new McIntire building on the Lawn. Most recently, the Institute donated $500,000 to McIntire to endow the John A. Griffin Fellowship to support a member of McIntire's finance faculty and fund the McIntire Research Seminar Series in perpetuity, a joint effort between McIntire and UVA Darden, the university's graduate business school, to promote research efforts across the university. The donation represented 100% of the investment fund's gains over a three-year period between 2016 and 2019.

== Organization ==
MII's investment decisions are entirely student-driven. The institute's membership currently consists of 7 managers, approximately 6 associates, and approximately 25+ analysts. Portfolio teams are composed of an associate, and 3-4 analysts. Throughout the semester, each portfolio team will work to come up with a long or short investment pitch. The fund focuses on conducting high-quality value-added research to make fundamentally-driven investment decisions across equities and related derivatives. The fund has a permanent capital base and is highly selective in making investment decisions to underwrite low-risk investments.
