= Victor McIntyre =

New Zealand shepherd, farmer, dog breeder and handler

William Victor McIntyre (24 May 1887 – 11 March 1964) was a New Zealand shepherd, farmer, dog breeder and handler. He was born in Pleasant Point, South Canterbury, New Zealand on 24 May 1887.
