= McEntire =

McEntire is a surname. Notable people with the surname include:

- Harry McEntire (born 1990), British actor
- John McEntire (born 1970), American recording engineer, drummer and multi-instrumentalist
- Pake McEntire (born 1953), American country music artist and older brother of Reba McEntire
- Reba McEntire (born 1955), American country music artist, nicknamed "The Queen of Country"

== See also ==
- McEntire Joint National Guard Base, military airport in Richland County, South Carolina, United States
- Rhea-McEntire House, historic antebellum mansion on the shoreline of the Tennessee River's Wheeler Lake in Decatur, Alabama
