= Kevin McIntyre =

Kevin McIntyre may refer to:

- Kevin McIntyre (footballer) (born 1977), English footballer
- Kevin McIntyre (boxer) (born 1978), Scottish boxer
- Kevin J. McIntyre (1960–2019), American lawyer
