= Donald McIntyre (physician) =

Donald McIntyre FRSE MBE MID (1891-1954) was a 20th-century Scottish gynecologist and medical author.

== Early life ==
McIntyre was born in Greenock on 29 July 1891 the son of Donald McIntyre.

He studied medicine at Glasgow University graduating MB ChB in 1914. At the outbreak of the First World War he joined the Royal Army Medical Corps and served for the duration of the war, based mainly in the Dardanelles and East Africa. He was Mentioned in Dispatches and was granted a military MBE after the war, also being retired on the rank of honorary Major.

== Career ==
After the war he took a Diploma at Trinity College Dublin. In 1920 he began working as a Pathologist for the Royal Samaritan Hospital for Women, in Glasgow. He was given his doctorate (MD) in 1926, also being awarded the Bellahouston Gold Medal for his thesis. He stayed at the Royal Samaritan Hospital seven years, rising to be Senior Surgeon. He held multiple medical positions in Glasgow Hospitals and was both a lecturer and examiner at Glasgow University. In 1927 he was elected a Fellow of the Royal Society of Edinburgh. His proposers were Thomas Hastie Bryce, Diarmid Noel Paton, Sir John Graham Kerr, and Ralph Stockman.

== Death ==
He died on 20 October 1954 in a Glasgow nursing home.

== Publications ==
- Operative Obstetrics (1937)
- Combined Textbook of Obstetrics and Gynaecology (1950)
