= Hugh McIntyre (cricketer) =

Scottish cricketer (1857–1905)

Hugh McIntyre (16 January 1857 – 25 June 1905) was a Scottish cricketer active in 1884 who played for Lancashire. He was born in Glasgow and died in Westminster. He appeared in one first-class match as a righthanded batsman and wicketkeeper. He scored one run with a highest score of 1* and held one catch with two stumpings.
