= McIntyre, Ontario =

McIntyre, Ontario may refer to:

- McIntyre, Lennox and Addington County, Ontario
- McIntyre, Grey County, Ontario
