= Doves Farm =

British flour company

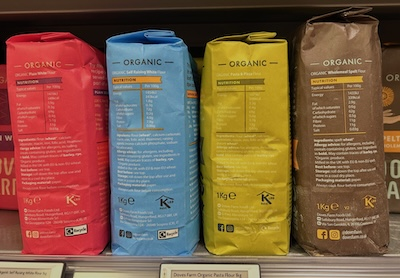
Bags of flour made by Doves Farm

Doves Farm is a British flour-milling company based near Shalbourne, Wiltshire which specialises in organic and gluten-free flour.

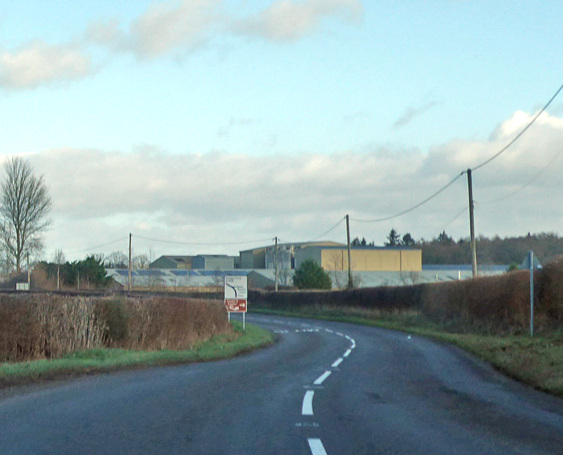
Factory near Shalbourne, Wiltshire, UK

The company was founded in 1978 by Claire and Michael Marriage, who as of 2026 continue to own it. In 2022 it took over Wessex Mill.
