= Auron MacIntyre =

Blaze Media podcast host

Auron MacIntyre is an American podcast host and author. He is a podcast host for Blaze Media. MacIntyre has made a name for himself in promoting paleoconservative political thought, as particularly mediated by figures such as Carl Schmitt, Vilfredo Pareto, Paul Gottfried, and others. In 2024, he authored the book The Total State: How Liberal Democracies Become Tyrannies.

Auron appeared on The Tucker Carlson Show episode "Auron MacIntyre: The American Empire Is Racing Towards Collapse – Here’s How to Prevent It" (YouTube), 18 Aug 2025, while the podcast is ranked #10 on Google's list of top podcasts, and achieved 269K views within 16 hours of publication.

MacIntyre stated that his frustrations with lockdowns and church closures led him to discover Curtis Yarvin, a blogger known for his neo-reactionary philosophy. MacIntyre described this event as an awakening that led him to other thinkers on the political right such as Sam Francis and Pat Buchanan. In September 2025, Reason Magazine questioned some of MacIntyre's claims, noting that Yarvin was a supporter of stringent lockdowns and that MacIntyre's social media feeds from 2020 contained relatively little commentary about the pandemic. MacIntyre's political philosophy has been described as "New Right" and "Postliberal," broadly aligning with Yarvin's "Dark Enlightenment" movement.
