= James McIntyre (soldier) =

James McIntyre (September 15, 1875 – 1930) was a United States soldier who served in the Philippines following the Spanish–American War. For his actions in May 1899, he was to receive the Medal of Honor. The award notification was mailed to the wrong address in 1906. His granddaughter received the Medal on his behalf in June 2026.
