= American Airlines Flight 476 =

1955 aviation accident

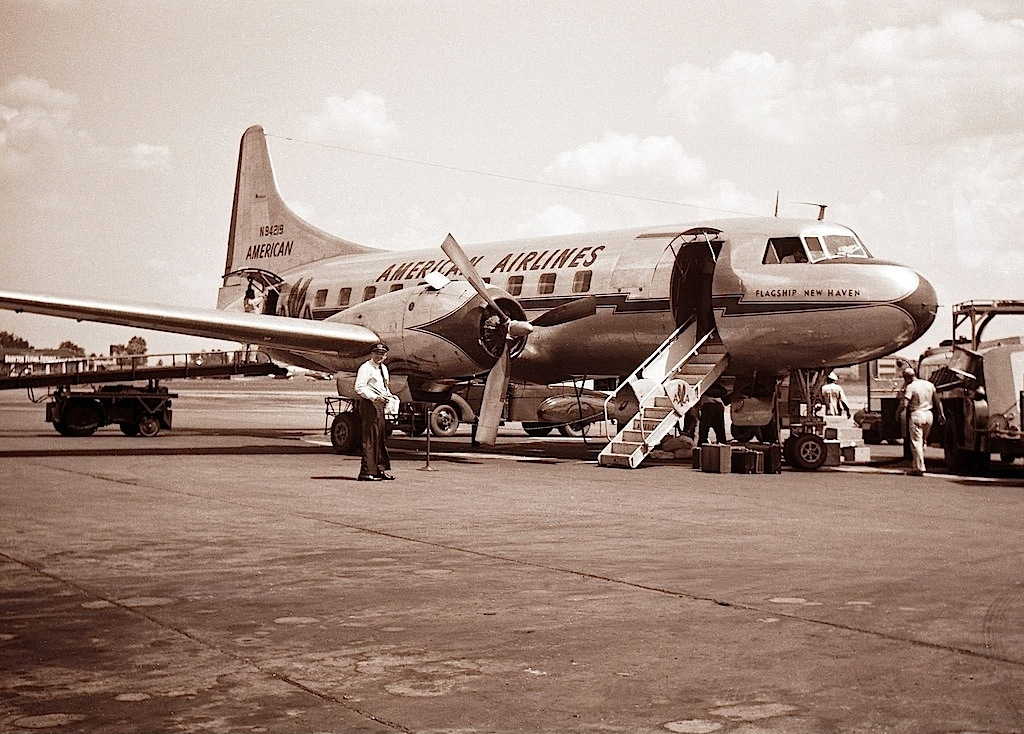
- An American Airlines Convair CV-240, similar to the accident aircraft

accident
- Date: August 4, 1955
- Summary: In-flight fire
- Site: Fort Leonard Wood, Missouri; 37°45′40″N 92°9′22″W

Aircraft
- Aircraft type: Convair CV-240-0
- Aircraft name: Flagship Philadelphia
- Operator: American Airlines
- Registration: N94221
- Flight origin: Tulsa Municipal Airport, Tulsa, Oklahoma
- 1st stopover: Joplin, Missouri
- 2nd stopover: Springfield, Missouri
- Last stopover: St. Louis, Missouri
- Destination: LaGuardia Airport, New York City, New York
- Passengers: 27
- Crew: 3
- Fatalities: 30
- Survivors: 0

American Airlines Flight 476 was a passenger flight operated by American Airlines from Tulsa Municipal Airport in Tulsa, Oklahoma to LaGuardia Airport in New York City, New York. On August 4, 1955, the Convair CV-240 crashed while attempting an emergency landing in Fort Leonard Wood, Missouri, killing all 30 passengers and crew. The Civil Aeronautics Board determined that the accident was caused by the installation of a damaged cylinder.

== Background ==
The aircraft was a 7-year-old Convair CV-240 that had logged 14,865 flight hours at the time of the accident. It was powered by two Pratt and Whitney R-2800-83AM4A engines that had logged 13,346 and 12,875 flight hours, each driving a Hamilton Standard propeller.

The captain was 45-year-old Hugh C. Barron, who had been employed by American Airlines since 1942. At the time of the accident, he had logged 15,540 flight hours, including around 5,000 in the Convair CV-240. The first officer was 35-year-old William G. Gates, who had logged around 8,500 flight hours, 2,500 of which were in the Convair CV-240. He had been employed by American Airlines since 1944. The flight's sole stewardess was 21-year-old Thelma R. Ballard, who had been employed by American Airlines for two months.

== Accident ==
At 10:06 am on August 4, 1955, Flight 476 departed Tulsa Municipal Airport bound for Laguardia Airport, carrying 8 passengers and 3 crew. Along the way, the aircraft made intermediary stops in Joplin and Springfield, Missouri. At Springfield, 21 additional passengers boarded the plane, while 2 departed.

Flight 476 took off from Springfield just before noon. The aircraft was scheduled to make another stop in St. Louis. At 12:17, Captain Barron attempted to radio for help, asking, "Does anybody read 476?" Ground crew in Springfield attempted to reach out to Flight 476, but they received no response. Afterward, ground crew in St. Louis, and two other nearby aircraft, including one near Springfield, heard the pilot of Flight 476 announce that their No. 2 engine was on fire. At 12:20, the aircraft near Springfield heard Flight 476 ask, "Springfield, are you reading 476? We have bad engine fire." An army pilot then saw the aircraft attempt to make an emergency landing in Fort Leonard Wood, Missouri and alerted the tower, who gave it clearance to land. However, at 12:23, the right wing detached from Flight 476, causing it to crash in a wooded area half a mile from Runway 14.

After the crash rescue crew attempted to reach the aircraft. However, the dense forest prevented rescue equipment from reaching the aircraft until army engineers bulldozed a road to it. They found that all 30 passengers and crew perished.

== Investigation ==
Soon after the crash, Civil Aeronautics Board employees arrived at the scene to investigate the cause of the accident. They found that the No. 12 cylinder of the right engine had a broken barrel. A closer examination at the National Bureau of Standards lab found that eight of the cylinder's hold-down studs had failed after previously being installed in another engine. Inspectors were aware of this and sent the cylinder to Tulsa for overhaul. Before the crash, American Airlines required that cylinders with more than two broken studs be scrapped or returned to their manufacturer. They also required that cylinders going through overhaul be inspected using sophisticated equipment. Instead, an airline inspector examined the cylinder visually, meaning neither rule was followed. At the time of the accident, the cylinder logged only a few flight hours.

== Aftermath ==
After the accident, American Airlines required all cylinders with faulty studs to be mutilated to prevent employees from returning them to service without proper repair.
