= Herman McIntire House =

Historic house in Massachusetts, United States

- U.S. National Register of Historic Places
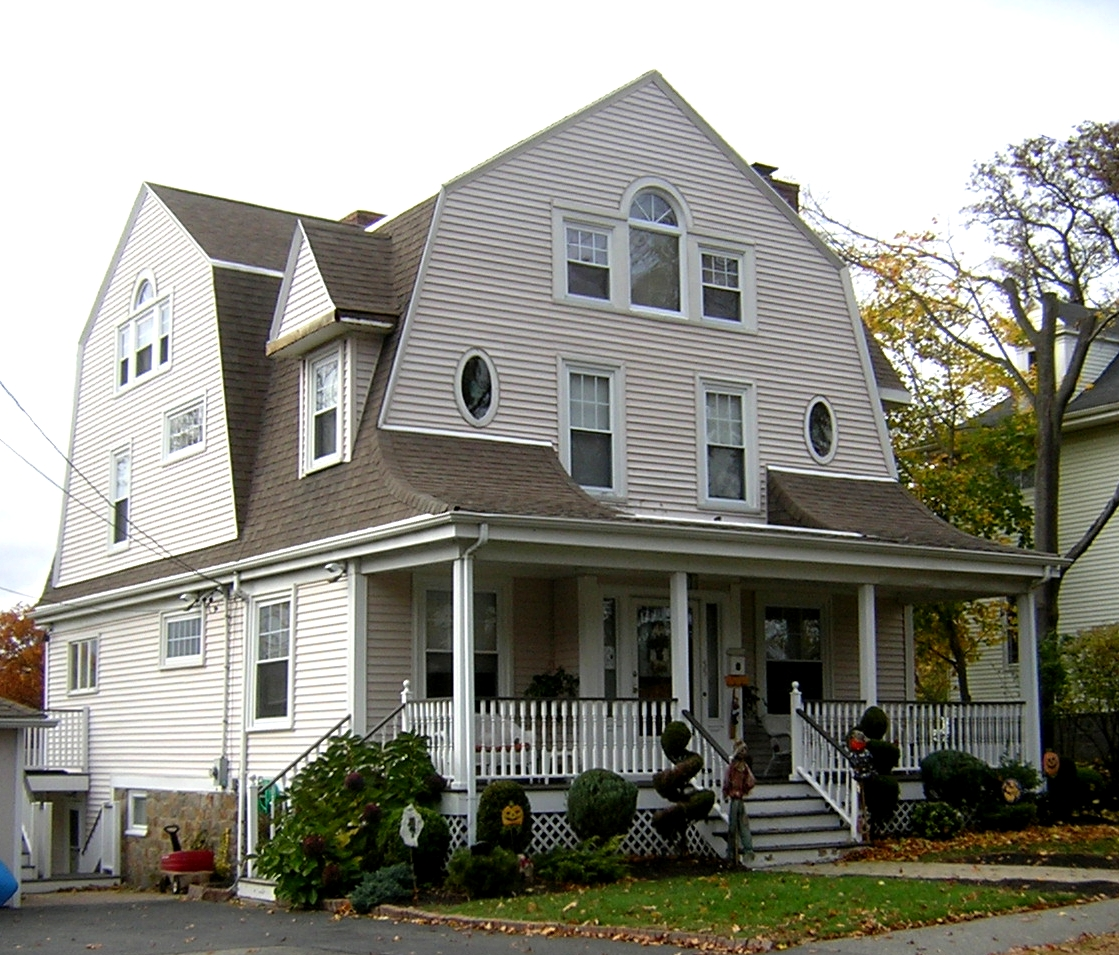

- Location within Massachusetts Location within the United States
- Location: 55 Dixwell Ave., Quincy, Massachusetts
- Coordinates: 42°14′59″N 71°0′28″W
- Area: 0.2 acres (0.081 ha)
- Built: 1900
- Architectural style: Shingle Style
- MPS: Quincy MRA
- NRHP reference No.: 89001326
- Added to NRHP: September 20, 1989

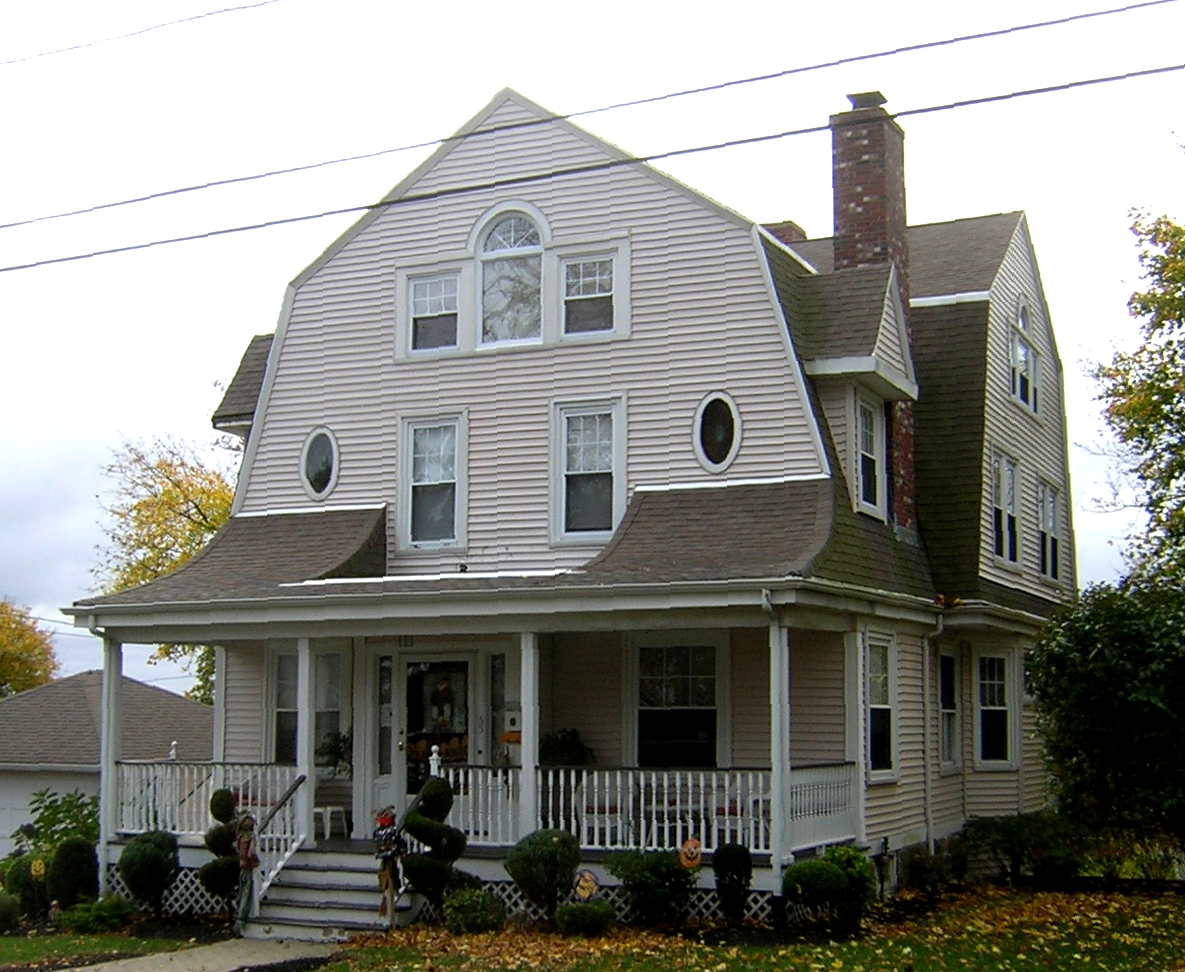

The Herman McIntire House is a historic house at 55 Dixwell Avenue in Quincy, Massachusetts. The 2 1/2-story wood-frame house is one of two houses built and lived in by Herman McIntire, a local realtor. This one (the other is at 21 Dixwell) is a well-preserved example of a large Shingle-style house, built in the affluent President's Hill neighborhood. The large gambrel gables are typical of the Shingle style, as are the varied window shapes. Its exterior has been partially compromised by the application of siding instead of shingling (see photo).

The house was listed on the National Register of Historic Places in 1989.

== See also ==
- National Register of Historic Places listings in Quincy, Massachusetts
