= William MacIntyre =

Scottish physician (c. 1791–1857)

William MacIntyre (c. 1791/92 – 4 March 1857) was a Scottish medical doctor known for publishing the first case report of multiple myeloma in 1850.

MacIntyre graduated from the University of Edinburgh in 1811.

He was appointed to HMS Ramillies as assistant surgeon on 5 December 1812. In 1820, he married Mary Warren Plowman, sister of the Ramillies' surgeon Henry Plowman, and had two daughters.

He then established a successful practice, eventually in Harley Street, London. He was also a consultant to the Western General Dispensary and Metropolitan Convalescent Institution. He became a fellow of the Royal College of Physicians in 1851.
