= Duncan A. McIntyre =

American aviation pioneer

Duncan A. McIntyre

Duncan A. McIntyre was early aviator and native of New Zealand, who on August 22, 1919 stopped in Tulsa, Oklahoma to visit an old army buddy. Originally intending to stay a short while on his way to Spokane, Washington, McIntyre decided that Tulsa was fertile ground for establishing an aviation business. He soon established a private airport on an 80-acre tract at the corner of Admiral Place and Sheridan Avenue. McIntyre Field had three hangars to house 40 aircraft and a beacon for landings after sundown. Within just a few years, McIntyre's airport was considered by many early flyers to be one of the finest airports in Oklahoma. Established almost a decade before Tulsa's municipal airport, McIntyre's offered flying lessons, charter services, mechanical services, and hosted transient flyers.

1927 was a busy year for McIntyre. The Ford National Reliability Air Tour chose his airport as one of its tour stops, bringing thousands of Tulsans to the airport to see an armada of touring aircraft. Later, on September 30, 1927, Charles Lindbergh visited Tulsa. He had been persuaded to visit Tulsa by William G. Skelly, who was then president of the local Chamber of Commerce, as well as a booster of the young aviation industry. In addition to being a wealthy oilman and founder of Skelly Oil Company, Skelly also founded Spartan Aircraft Company. Lindbergh had already landed at Oklahoma City Municipal Airport, Bartlesville Municipal Airport and Muskogee's Hatbox Field. All of these were superior to the privately owned McIntyre Field. Lindbergh pointed this out at a banquet given that night in his honor. Landing at McIntyre's airport, Lindbergh complimented McIntyre on his facility while simultaneously criticizing the city fathers for their failure to establish a city-owned airport. Lindbergh's speech galvanized some of Tulsa's early leaders. Within two years, Tulsa had its own municipal airport.

McIntyre evidently closed his airport during the 1930s and in 1931, for the sum of $350,000, the Garland Airport was merged into the McIntyre Airport Company. McIntyre became the owner of what later would be the Brown Airport. In 1940, McIntyre accepted a position with Lockheed and moved to California.

McIntyre stayed in Tulsa until 1940, when he moved to California to take a job with Lockheed. He returned to Tulsa on one more occasion, to dedicate the new modern terminal in 1961.
