= List of aircraft (Sp) =

This is a list of aircraft in alphabetical order beginning with 'Sp'.

== Sp ==
=== SpaceX ===
- SpaceX Falcon 9 "Full Thrust"
- SpaceX Falcon Heavy
- SpaceX Starship
- SpaceX Falcon 1
- SpaceX Falcon 9 v1.0
- SpaceX Falcon 9 v1.1
- SpaceX Grasshopper
- SpaceX Falcon 1e
- SpaceX Falcon 5
- SpaceX Falcon 9 Air
- SpaceX BFR
- SPaceX Raptor
- SpaceX Rideshare

=== Spacek sro ===
(Hodonin, Czech Republic)

- Spacek SD-1 Minisport

=== SPAD ===
(Société Pour l'Aviation et ses Dérivés) for post 1917 designs, see: Blériot

- SPAD S.A
- SPAD S.B
- SPAD S.D
- SPAD S.E
- SPAD S.F
- SPAD S.G
- SPAD S.H
- SPAD S.I
- SPAD S.J
- SPAD S.K
- SPAD S.V
- SPAD S.VII
- SPAD S.XI
- SPAD S.XII
- SPAD S.XIII
- SPAD S.XIV
- SPAD S.XV
- SPAD S.XVI
- SPAD S.XVII
- SPAD S.XVIII
- SPAD S.XIX
- SPAD S.XX
- SPAD S.51 Tailfin

=== Sparling ===
((John Nicholas) Sparling Propeller & Aeroplane Factory, E St Louis, MO)

- Sparling 1912 Biplane

=== Sparmann ===
- Sparmann S-1A
- Sparmann E4
- Sparmann P1 military designation - prototype 1
- Sparmann P3 military designation - prototype 3

=== Sparrow ===
(W W Sparrow, Healdron, OK)

- Sparrow Model 1

=== Spartan ===
(UK)

- Spartan Arrow
- Spartan Clipper
- Spartan Cruiser
- Spartan Three Seater

=== Spartan ===
(Spartan Aircraft Co, Tulsa, OK)

- Spartan 1927 Biplane
- Spartan 7W Executive
- Spartan 7W-F
- Spartan 7W-P Executive
- Spartan 7X Executive (a.k.a. Standard Seven)
- Spartan 8W Zeus
- Spartan 12W Executive
- Spartan C2-60
- Spartan C2-165
- Spartan C3-1
- Spartan C3-2
- Spartan C3-120
- Spartan C3-3
- Spartan C3-4
- Spartan C3-5
- Spartan C3-165
- Spartan C3-166
- Spartan C3-225
- Spartan C4
- Spartan C4-225
- Spartan C4-300
- Spartan C4-301 (a.k.a. E4-301)
- Spartan C5-300
- Spartan C5-301
- Spartan 8W Zeus
- Spartan FBW-1
- Spartan NP
- Spartan NS
- Spartan C-71

=== Spartan Microlights ===
- Spartan DFD Aerotome
- Spartan DFD Aerotome Dual
- Spartan DFS Trike

=== SPCA ===
(Société Provençale de Construction Aéronautique)

- SPCA Météore 63
- SPCA VII
- SPCA 10
- SPCA 20
- SPCA 30
- SPCA 40T
- SPCA 41T
- SPCA 218
- SPCA 60T
- SPCA 80
- SPCA 81
- SPCA 82
- SPCA 90
- SPCA 91T
- SPCA Paulhan-Pillard I
- SPCA Paulhan-Pillard E.5
- SPCA Paulhan-Pillard T.3 BN.4
- SPCA Hermès

=== Spearman ===
(Sam Spearman, Dunkirk, OH)

- Spearman S-1

=== Specialized ===
(Specialized Aircraft Co (pres: Jack Coroy), Camarillo, CA)

- Specialized Tri Turbo-3

=== Specter Aircraft ===
(Bancroft, Idaho, United States)

- Specter Aircraft Specter II

=== Spectrum ===
(Spectrum Aircraft Corps, Van Nuys Airport, CA)

- Spectrum SA-550 Spectrum-One
- Spectrum Aircraft SA-26 Vulcan

=== Spectrum ===
(Spectrum Aircraft Inc)

- Spectrum Beaver RX-28
- Spectrum Beaver RX-35
- Spectrum Beaver RX-35 Floater
- Spectrum Beaver RX-550
- Spectrum Beaver RX-550 Floater
- Spectrum Beaver RX-550 SP
- Spectrum Beaver RX-550 Plus
- Spectrum Beaver RX-650
- Spectrum Beaver SS
- Spectrum Beaver SS-11 Skywatch (Freedom Lite and Legend Lite)

=== Spectrum ===
(Spectrum Aeronautical)

- Spectrum S-33 Independence
- Spectrum S-40 Freedom

=== Speed ===
(Robert E Speed and Ronald Johnson)

- Speed F8F Beercat

=== Speed Bird ===
(Speed Bird Corp (Perth Amboy Title Co), Keyport, NJ)

- Speed Bird 1933 Biplane
- Speed Bird A

=== Speedtwin ===
(Speedtwin Developments Ltd)

- Speedtwin E2E Comet 1

=== Spencer ===
(Herbert Spencer)

- Spencer-Stirling biplane
- Spencer 1912 biplane
- Spencer-Farman

=== Spencer ===
(Percy H Spencer, Farmingdale, NY)

- Spencer 1914 flying boat
- Spencer S-10 Monoplane
- Spencer S-12 Air Car
- Spencer S-14 Air Car Junior

=== Spencer-Larsen ===
((Percy H) Spencer-(Victor A) Larsen Aircraft Co, Farmingdale, NY)

- Spencer-Larsen SL-12C

=== Sperwill Ltd ===
(Bristol, UK)

- Sperwill 120
- Sperwill 2+
- Sperwill 210
- Sperwill 3+
- Sperwill CA
- Sperwill ST
- Sperwill TX

=== Sperry ===
(Lawrence Sperry Aircraft Co, Farmingdale, NY)

- Sperry 1911 Biplane
- Sperry Hi-Lift
- Sperry Land and Sea Triplane
- Sperry Light Bomber
- Sperry M-1 Messenger
- Sperry MAT
- Sperry Sport
- Sperry Sportplane

=== Spezio ===
(Tony & Dorothy Spezio, Bethany, OK)

- Spezio Tuholer (a.k.a. Spezio Sport DAL-1)

=== Spier ===
((Siegmund) Spier Aircraft Corp, Jersey City, New Jersey;)

- Spier Pursuit Trainer

=== Spijker ===
(Spijker, from 1915 the Nederlands Automobile and Aeroplane Co.)

- Spijker V.1
- Spijker V.2
- Spijker V.3
- Spijker V.4

=== Spike ===
(Spike Aerospace)

- Spike S-512

=== Spinks ===
(M H Spinks Sr, Ft Worth, TX)

- Spinks Akromaster

=== Spiral Aircraft ===
- Spiral S-1
- Spiral S-4
- Spiral S-15
- Spiral S-20
- Spiral S-20E
- Spiral S-150
- Spiral S-150E
- Spiral S-190

=== Spitfire ===
(Spitfire Helicopter Co, Media, PA)

- Spitfire Mark I
- Spitfire Mark II Tigershark
- Spitfire Mark IV

=== Sport 2000 ===
(Capena, Italy)

- Sport 2000 80

=== Sport Copter ===
- Sport Copter 2
- Sport Copter Lightning
- Sport Copter Vortex

=== Sport Flight ===
(Sport Flight Aviation)

- Sport Flight Talon
- Sport Flight Talon Magnum
- Sport Flight Talon XP
- Sport Flight Talon Super Magnum
- Sport Flight Talon Typhoon

=== Sport Performance Aviation ===
- Sport Performance Aviation Panther

=== Sport Racer ===
(Sport Racer Inc., Valley Center, Kansas, United States)

- Sport Racer

=== Sport-Jet, Limited ===
- Sport Jet II

=== Sportavia-Pützer ===
- Sportavia-Pützer RF-7
- Sportavia-Pützer RS-180 Sportsman
- Sportavia-Pützer SFS 31 Milan

=== Spotsy ===
(Spotsy Aircraft Corp (Victor Gottchling & Emil W Pwters), 4109 Germaine Ave, Cleveland, OH)

- Spotsy Model 1

=== Spratt ===
(George Spratt / Spratt Aircraft Inc, Costesville, PA)

- Spratt 1912 Biplane
- Spratt 1934 Monoplane
- Spratt Controlwing
- Spratt Controlwing 105
- Spratt Controlwing 106
- Spratt Controlwing 107

=== Spring ===
(William J. Spring, Burlington, Ontario, Canada)

- Spring WS202 Sprint

=== Springfield ===
(Springfield School of Aviation, Springfield, OR)

- Springfield JM2P

=== Spyker ===
- Spyker V.1
- Spyker V.2
- Spyker V.3
