= Spartan (disambiguation) =

A Spartan is a person from the ancient Greek city-state of Sparta.

The word may also refer to the following:

== People ==
- Roderick Bradley, who competes as "Spartan", a gladiator in the UK TV series Gladiators
- Andrey Koreshkov (born 1990), Russian mixed martial artist nicknamed "Spartan"
- Vinicius Queiroz (born 1983), Brazilian mixed martial artist nicknamed "Spartan"

== Places ==
- Spartan, Kempton Park

== Entertainment ==
=== Fictional characters ===
- SPARTAN Program, supersoldiers in the Halo series of games
- Spartan (comics), a Wildstorm comic book character
- John Diggle, a character in the TV series Arrow codenamed "Spartan"

=== Other uses in entertainment ===
- Spartan (book), a 1988 novel by Valerio Massimo Manfredi
- Spartan (film), 2004 American film written and directed by David Mamet
- Spartan (video game), a 2004 computer game
- Spartan: Total Warrior, a 2005 console-based video game
- Spartan: Ultimate Team Challenge, sports entertainment TV show based on the Spartan race obstacle challenge
- "Spartan" (Arrow episode), 2019
- "Spartan", episode 15 of the French 2013 series Code Lyoko: Evolution

== Sports ==
- Spartan race, a type of obstacle-based race
- Spartans, runners who have completed 10 Melbourne Marathons

=== Collegiate varsity teams ===
- Case Western Reserve Spartans
- Castleton Spartans, Vermont State University
- Dubuque Spartans, University of Dubuque
- Michigan State Spartans
- Missouri Baptist Spartans
- Norfolk State Spartans
- San Jose State Spartans
- Tampa Spartans, University of Tampa
- USC Upstate Spartans, University of South Carolina Upstate
- UNC Greensboro Spartans, University of North Carolina at Greensboro

=== Football (soccer) teams ===
- Hamrun Spartans F.C.
- The Spartans F.C.
- Blyth Spartans A.F.C.
- Blacktown Spartans FC

== Transport and military ==
=== Aviation ===
- Alenia C-27J Spartan, military tactical transport aircraft
- Spartan Aircraft Company, American firm
  - Spartan 8W Zeus
  - Spartan 12W Executive
  - Spartan C2
  - Spartan C3
  - Spartan C4
  - Spartan C5
  - Spartan NP
  - Spartan Executive
- Spartan Aircraft Ltd, British firm
  - Simmonds Spartan
  - Spartan Arrow
  - Spartan Three Seater
  - Spartan Cruiser
  - Spartan Clipper
- Spartan Microlights, an American aircraft manufacturer
  - Spartan DFD Aerotome, an American ultralight aircraft
  - Spartan DFS Paramotor, an American ultralight aircraft
  - Spartan DFS Trike, an American ultralight aircraft
  - Spartan BP Parawing, an American ultralight aircraft
- Simmonds Spartan, 1920s British biplane

=== Land vehicles ===
- Spartan Motors, manufacturer of fire fighting vehicles
- FV103 Spartan, British armoured personnel carrier
- Streit Group Spartan APC, light armoured vehicle, built in Canada and Ukraine
- Spartan Cars, a British kit car maker

=== Ships ===
- HMS Spartan, various British Royal Navy ships
- USS Spartan (SP-336), a United States Navy minesweeper in commission from 1917 to 1919
- SS Spartan, a railroad car ferry on Lake Michigan formerly operated by the Chesapeake and Ohio Railway (C&O)

=== Ballistics ===
- LIM-49 Spartan, American anti-ballistic missile

== Other meanings ==
- Spartans (Greek political party), an ultranationalist party in Greek politics
- Spartan (extinct dog breed)
- Spartan (chemistry software), a molecular modeling and computational chemistry application
- Spartan (apple), an apple cultivar developed in 1926
- Spartan (typeface), a geometric sans-serif typeface
- Spartan or Project Spartan, the codename of the Microsoft Edge Legacy web browser
- Spartan Alphabet, in fingerspelling
- The Spartans Drum and Bugle Corps, an Open Class drum and bugle corps from Nashua, New Hampshire
- Spartan Communications, a company based in Spartanburg, South Carolina, that was purchased by Medi
- Xilinx Spartan, a family of integrated circuits
- Station power, articulation, thermal, and analysis (SPARTAN) Flight Controller, for the International Space Station

== See also ==
- Sparta (disambiguation)
