= N52 =

N52 may refer to:

== Roads ==
- Route nationale 52, in France
- N52 road (Ireland)
- Kalinga–Cagayan Road, in the Philippines
- Nebraska Highway 52, in the United States

== Other uses ==
- N52 (Long Island bus)
- BMW N52, an automobile engine
- HMS Trident (N52), a submarine of the Royal Navy
- HNoMS Vidar (N52), a minelayer of the Royal Norwegian Navy
- Nostromo SpeedPad n52, a computer gaming peripheral
- Okamura N-52, a Japanese sport aircraft
- Neodymium magnet grade for one of the strongest (N30-N55) types
