= Spyker 60 HP =

1903 4WD race car

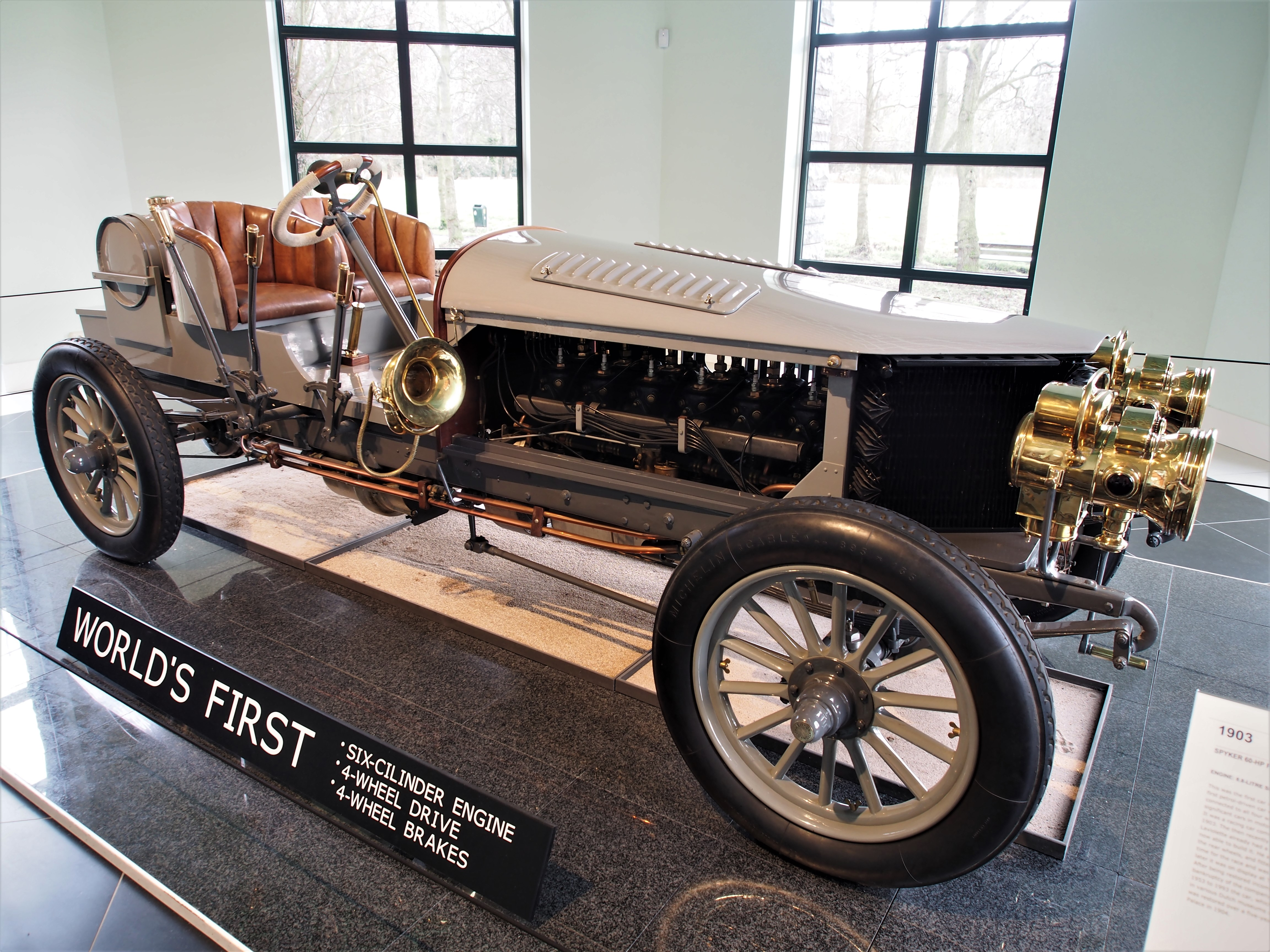
The 1903 Spyker 60HP was the world's first petrol-fuelled 4WD car. (Louwman Museum, The Hague, Netherlands)

The 1903 Spyker 60 HP race car, is the world's first petrol-fuelled four-wheel drive car. Known as "the car of three firsts", it was also the world's first car with a six-cylinder engine (an 8.8-litre inline design), and the first car with a four-wheel braking system, (as well as a transmission brake). Built in 1902–1903, the car with a top speed between 130 km/h (81 mph) and 145 km/h (90 mph) was manufactured by the Dutch carriage and automobile maker Spyker, started in 1880 by blacksmiths Jacobus and Hendrik-Jan Spijker.

Additionally, a 1906 race victory, combined with the fact that most European roads were still unpaved at the time, make the Spyker 60 HP most likely the world's first 4WD rally race car.

The 60 HP was commissioned by Jacobus Spijker for the 1903 Paris–Madrid race (although Bill Boddy, in a 1995 article for Motor Sport, states the Gordon Bennett race, the fore-runner of the Grand Prix that would be staged at Le Mans in 1906). The Belgian engineer Joseph Valentin Laviolette already had a design for an engine with six separate cylinders, and he designed a transmission that drove the front as well as the rear wheels, by extending the cardan-shaft from the gearbox forwards, as well as fitting a transmission brake.

However, the car was not ready in time for the race in May of 1903, and was instead presented in December 1903, in Paris, as well as going on display at The Crystal Palace in London two months later.

The Spyker 60 HP racing car only raced twice – at Blackpool, in 1904, where it finished third, and at Birmingham, in 1906, where it won.

The model on show at the Louwman Museum, in The Hague, Netherlands, was acquired in 1993 after having been housed at various Dutch museums. It was restored over a five-year period to its original condition as displayed at The Crystal Palace in 1904.

== Gallery ==
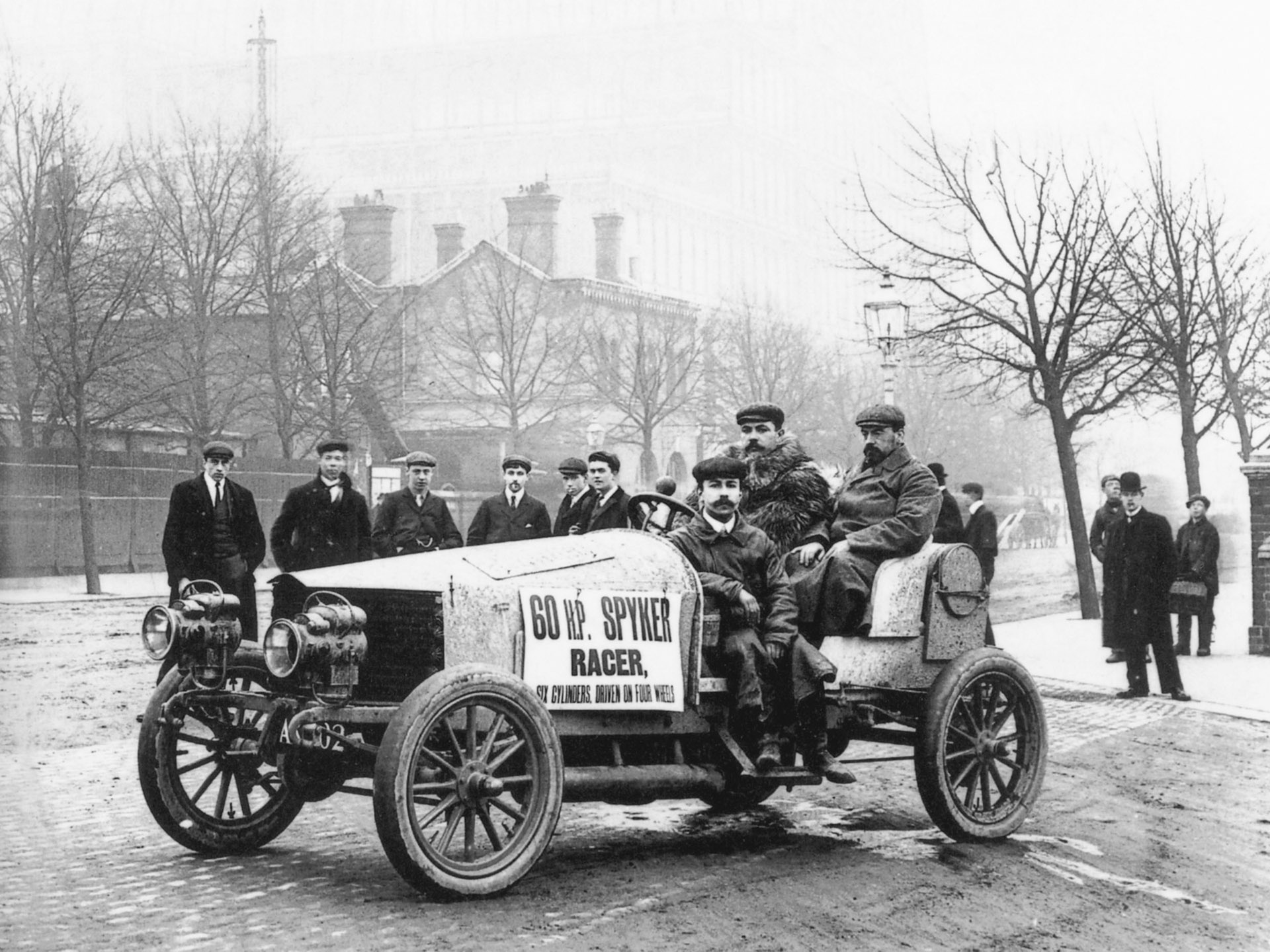
Spyker 60 HP (1903)

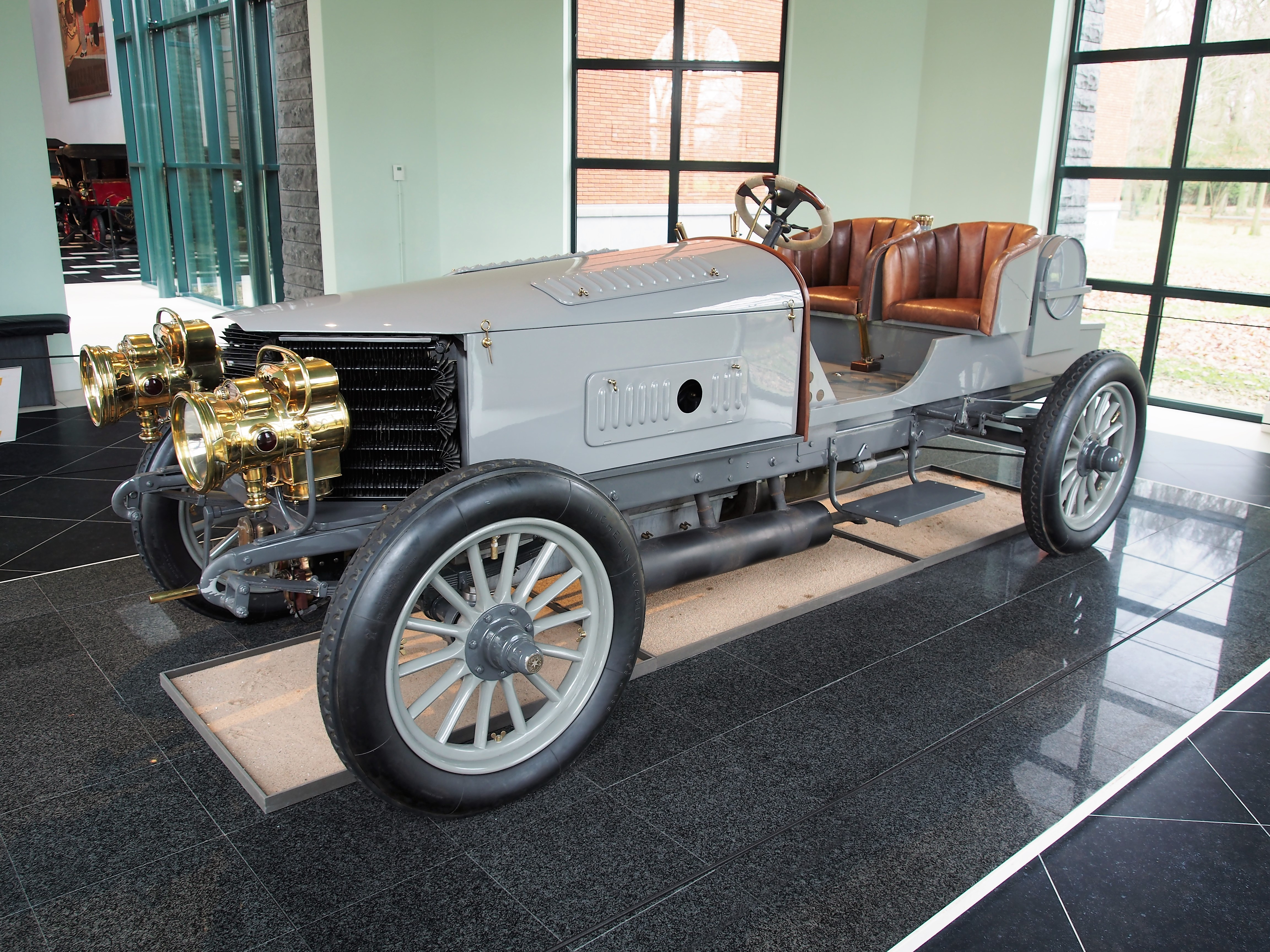
Spyker 60 HP (Louwman Museum, The Hague, Netherlands)

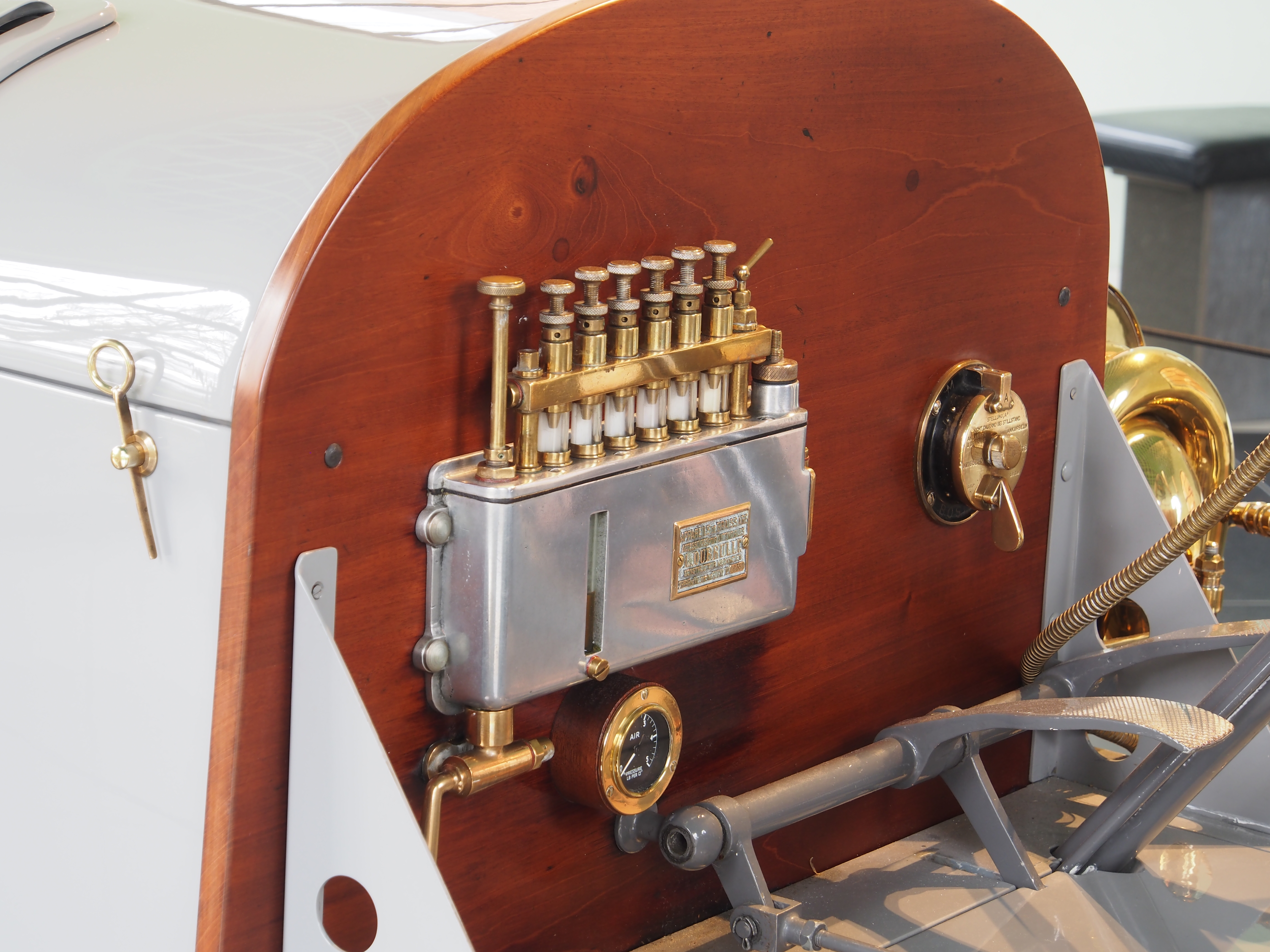
Spyker 60 HP: dashboard and pedals (detail). Louwman Museum, The Hague, Netherlands

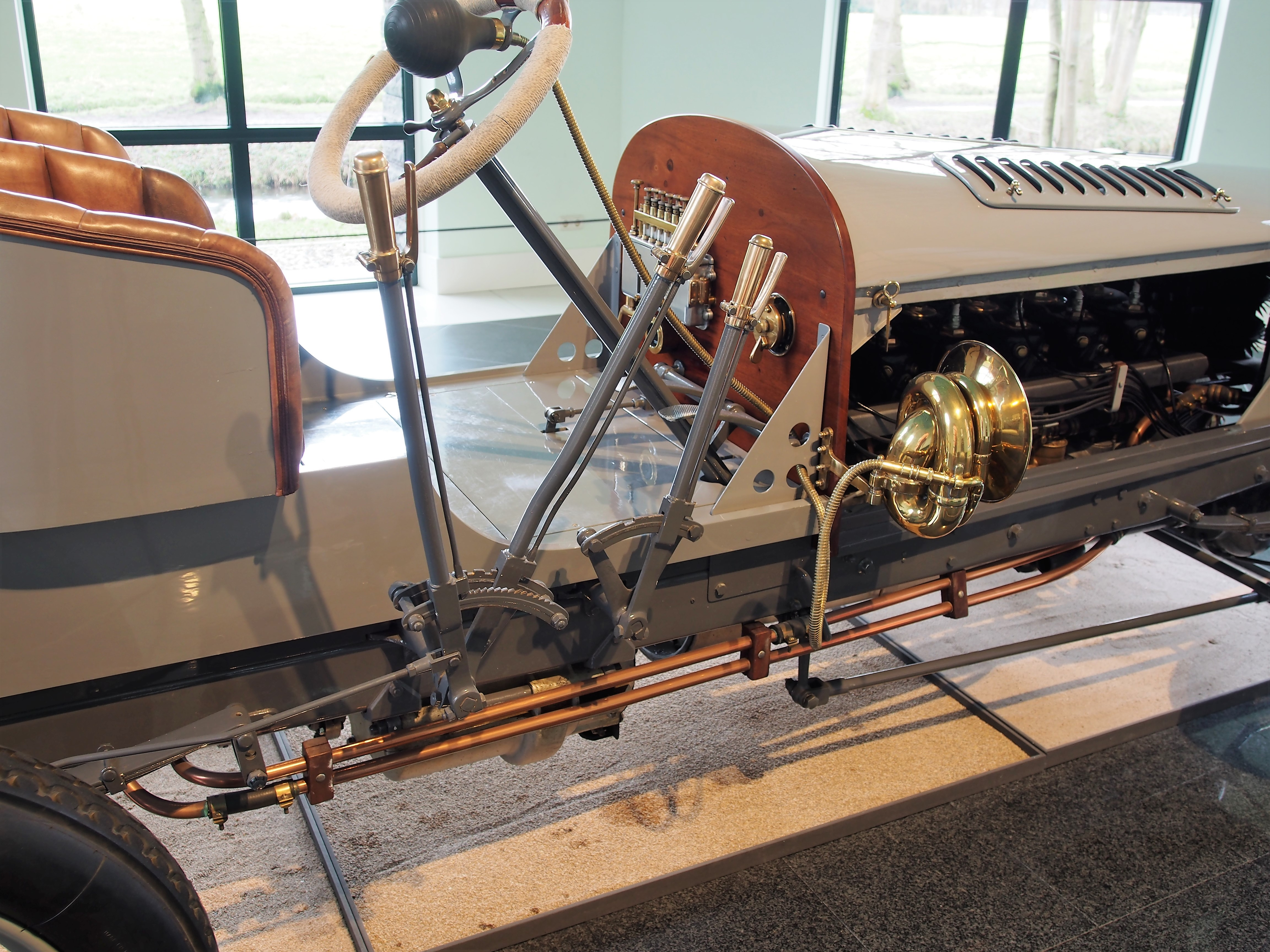
Spyker 60 HP: levers and pedals (detail). Louwman Museum, The Hague, Netherlands
