= Spijker V.1 =

Dutch fighter prototype

V.1

General information
- Type: Single seat fighter aircraft
- National origin: Netherlands
- Manufacturer: Spijker (from March 1914 the Nederlands Automobile and Aeroplane Co.), Trompenburg.
- Designer: Fransman Vannehard and Albert Gilles Von Baumgarter
- Primary user: MLD
- Number built: 1

History
- Introduction date: 1917
- First flight: 31 March 1917
- Retired: 1920

The Spijker, Spyker V.1 or Spyker-Trompenburg V.1, was a single seat biplane fighter built in the Netherlands during World War I. It was underpowered and did not go into production.

== Design and development ==
After the outbreak of World War I it was difficult for the neutral Dutch armed forces to obtain aircraft from abroad and so the Ammunition Agency approached the Nederlands Automobile and Aeroplane Co. for an indigenous fighter. This request resulted in the Spijker V.1, a conventionally laid out tractor biplane powered by a 60 kW (80 hp) Swedish licence built Thulin Gnôme rotary engine. It was a single bay design with pairs of parallel interplane struts assisted by four parallel cabane struts between the central upper wing and the fuselage. There was neither stagger nor sweep to the fabric covered wings, which had constant chord and squared tips. A semi-circular cut-out in the upper wing trailing edge over the cockpit enhanced the pilot's upward view.

The V.1's fuselage was rectangular in cross-section, with the engine partially enclosed by a helmet shaped cowling open at the bottom. The open, single seat cockpit was over the wing trailing edge. The tailplane, carrying separate elevators, was mounted on the top of the fuselage and wire-braced to the fin; the rounded rudder extended to the keel. The V.1 had a fixed, conventional undercarriage with mainwheels on a single axle supported by two V-form pairs of struts, originally curved but straight by May 1917. There was a small tail skid mounted forward of the elevator.

== Operational history ==
The prototype was complete by late 1916 but concerns over structural strength and some engine tuning delayed the first flight until 31 March 1917, flown by Floris Albert Van Heyst. Test flights led to aerobatics and Van Heyst became the first Dutchman to execute a loop in a military aircraft. Nonetheless, its low powered engine did not provide high enough performance for a fighter and no more powerful engines were immediately available in the Netherlands. No more V.1s were built; the prototype was bought by the Netherlands Naval Aviation Service in 1917 and retired in 1920.

== Specifications ==
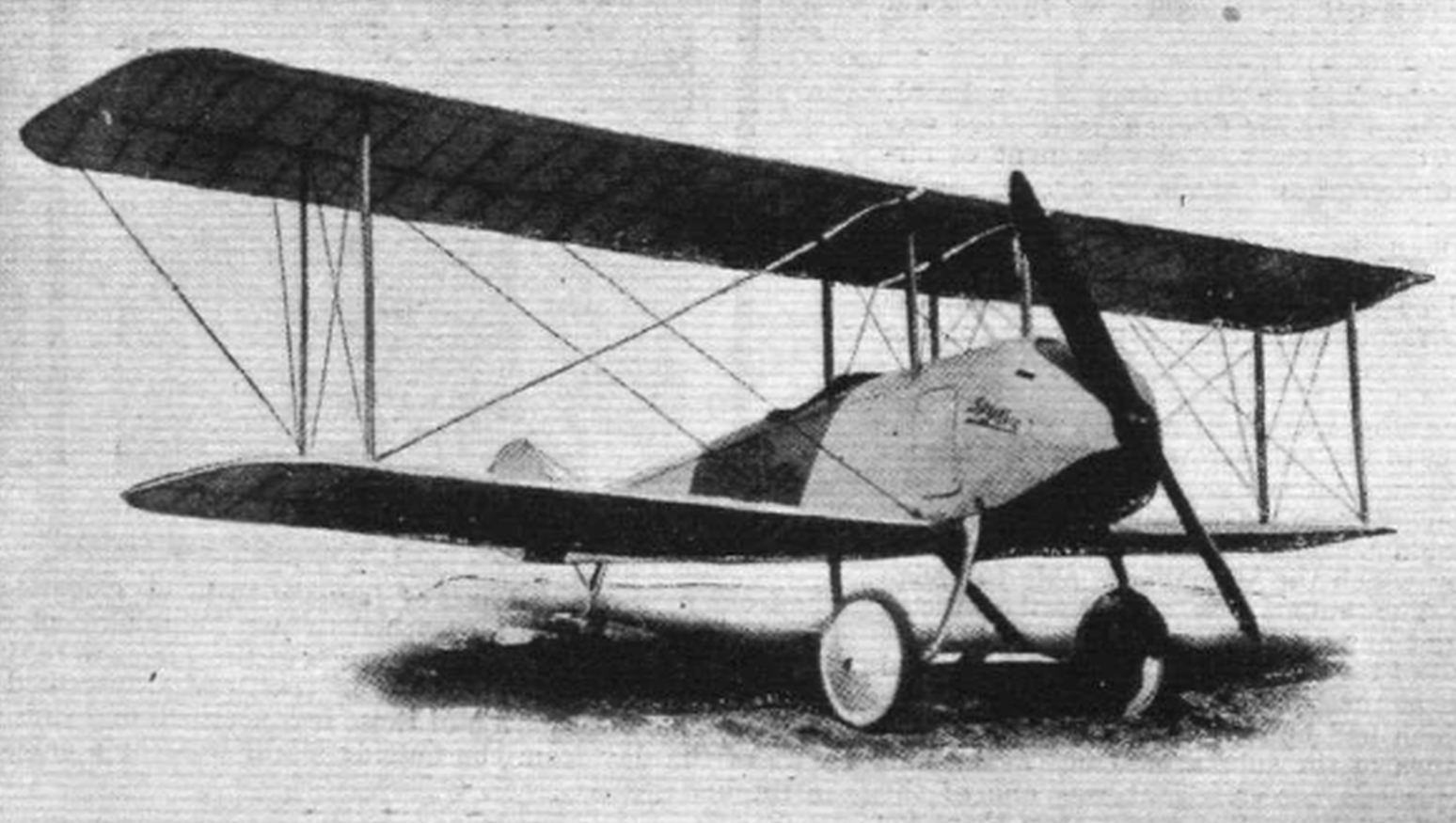
The Spijker V.1 in its early form with curved undercarriage front legs and no cut-out in the upper wing

Data from Wesselink

General characteristics

- Crew: One
- Length: 7.50 m (24 ft 7 in)
- Wingspan: 9.50 m (31 ft 2 in)
- Powerplant: 1 × Thulin rotary engine, 60 kW (80 hp)
- Propellers: 2-bladed

Performance

- Maximum speed: 138 km/h (86 mph, 75 kn)

== Bibliography ==
- Hazewinkel, Harm J. (October 2003). "Spijker: Le premiers Hollandais volants" [Spijker: The First Dutch Aircraft]. Le Fana de l'Aviation (in French) (407): 40–50. ISSN 0757-4169.
