= Spijker V.3 =

Dutch fighter prototype

V.3

General information
- Type: Single-seat fighter
- National origin: Netherlands
- Manufacturer: Spijker (from 1915 the Nederlands Automobile and Aeroplane Co.), Trompenburg.
- Number built: c.1

History
- First flight: July 1919

The Spijker V.3, sometimes anglicized to Spyker V.3 or Spyker-Trompenburg V.3, was a Dutch single-engine, single-seat biplane fighter, designed and built just before the end of World War I.

== Design ==
The Spijker V.3 was a conventionally laid-out single-engine tractor biplane. Its wings had constant chord and no sweep or stagger. It was a single-bay biplane, with one pair of parallel interplane struts on each side and with a central cabane between fuselage and the upper wing. The interplane struts were simple flat steel bands, without the commonly used airfoil profile. Ailerons were fitted to both upper and lower wings. The pilot's cockpit was under the wing, placing his head at about 70% chord, so a cut out was made in the trailing edge of the upper wing to enhance the rearward, upward view and a window in the wing centre section improved the forward, upward view.

The V.3 had a wooden monocoque fuselage. It was powered by a 97 kW (130 hp) Spijker-Clerget rotary engine, driving a two-blade propeller and enclosed by a full cowling. The conventional undercarriage was fixed, with mainwheels on a divided axle supported at each end on wooden V-form struts. A tail skid completed the landing gear. The tailplane was mounted near the top of the fuselage, carrying elevators divided to allow for rudder movement, as the latter extended down to the keel. The fin and rudder were broad chord and rounded in profile.

== Operational history ==
The V.3 prototype flew for the first time in July 1919. It was on display at one of the first post-war air shows, the Eerste Luchtverkeer Tentoonstelling (First Air Traffic Exhibition) held in Amsterdam in August 1919.

Large numbers of V.3 were ordered before the first flight; 72 for the Army Aviation Group, 20 for the Dutch Naval Aviation Service and 6 for the KNIL. However, the end of World War I made available large numbers of German-built Fokker D.VIIs. These were judged technically superior, so V.3 production never started. A two-seat reconnaissance version of the V.3, designated the Spijker V.4 had also been ordered in quantity (118) but not even the prototype was completed.

== Specifications ==
Data from Jane's Fighting Aircraft of World War I

General characteristics

- Crew: One
- Length: 6.10 m (20 ft 0 in) or 6.30
- Wingspan: 8.19 m (26 ft 10 in) upper and lower wings
- Height: 2.6 m (8 ft 6 in) maximum
- Fuel capacity: 127 L (28 Imp gal, 34 US gal)
- Oil capacity: 18 L (4.0 Imp gal, 4.8 US gal)
- Powerplant: 1 × Spijker Clerget type rotary engine, 97 kW (130 hp)
- Propellers: 2-bladed

Performance

- Maximum speed: 180 km/h (110 mph, 97 kn)
- Rate of climb: 5.6 m/s (1,100 ft/min) with full load
- Wing loading: 25 kg/m^{2} (5.1 lb/sq ft)

Armament

- Guns: 2× machine guns

== Bibliography ==
- Hazewinkel, Harm J. (October 2003). "Spijker: Le premiers Hollandais volants" [Spijker: The First Dutch Aircraft]. Le Fana de l'Aviation (in French) (407): 40–50. ISSN 0757-4169.
