= Spijker V.2 =

Dutch trainer aircraft

V.2
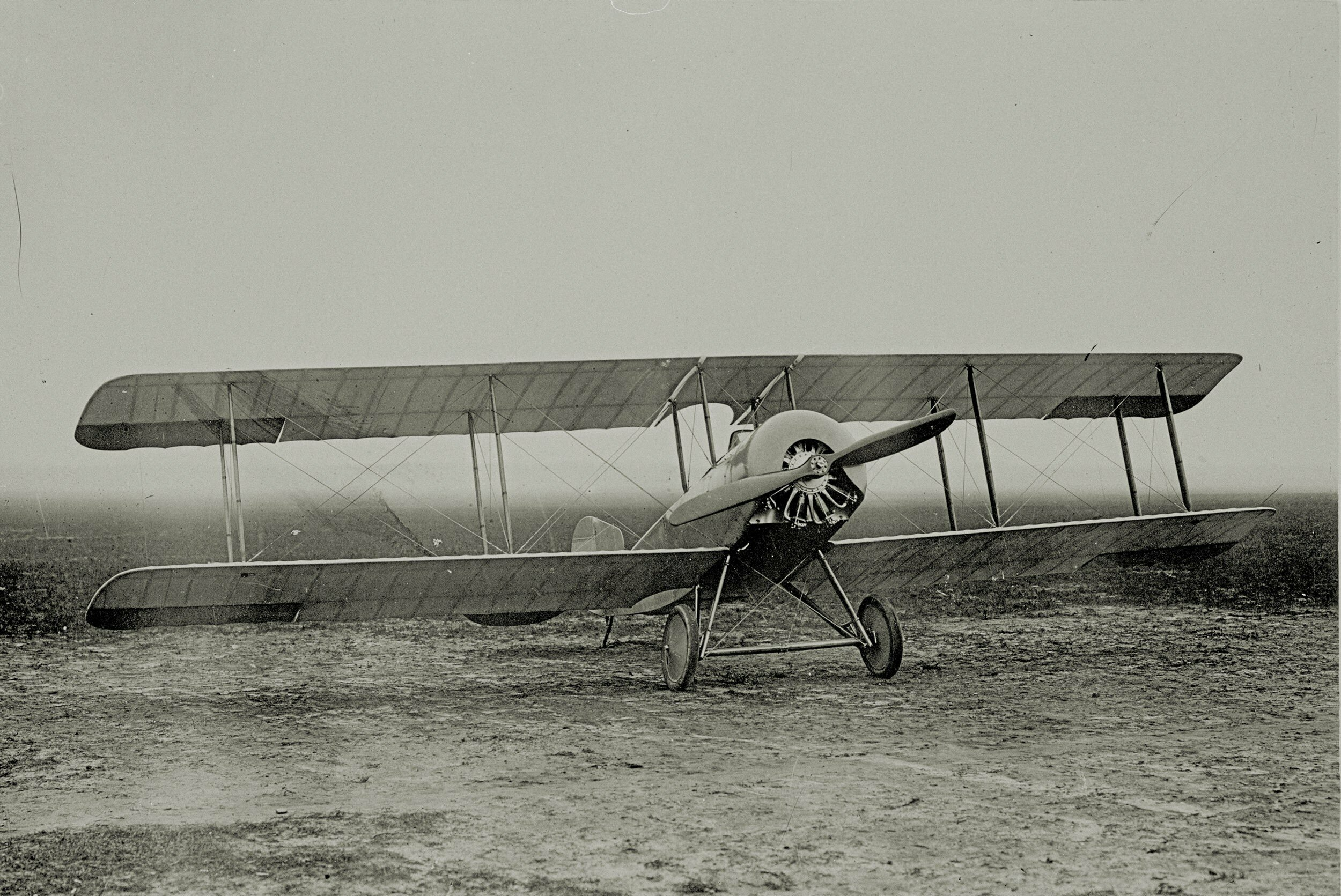

General information
- Type: Dual control training aircraft
- National origin: Netherlands
- Manufacturer: Spijker (from 1915 the Nederlands Automobile and Aeroplane Co.), Trompenburg.
- Number built: 78

History
- First flight: March 1917
- Retired: 1926

The Spijker V.2, sometimes anglicized to Spyker V.2 or Spyker-Trompenburg V.2, was a low powered, tandem seat biplane designed and built for the Dutch government for pilot training towards the end of World War I. More than seventy were built.

== Design ==
The Spijker V.2 was a conventionally laid out single engine tractor biplane. Its wings had constant chord and no sweep or stagger. It was a two bay biplane, with two pairs of parallel interplane struts on each side and two further pairs acting as a cabane between fuselage and the upper wing. Ailerons were fitted to both upper and lower wings. Over the fuselage was a semicircular cut out in the trailing edge of the upper wing to enhance the upward view from the rear seat. The tandem open cockpits were fitted with dual controls.

The V.2 was powered by a 60 kW (80 hp) Thulin A (Le Rhône 9C) rotary engine, driving a two blade propeller and enclosed by a 360° or 270° cowling. Its fuselage was built with wooden longerons and T-sectioned cross pieces braced with wire. The conventional undercarriage was fixed, with mainwheels on a single axle supported at each end on V-form struts, cross braced. A tail skid completed the landing gear.

== Operational history ==
Because of the war in which the Netherlands remained neutral the European public did not see the V.2 until one of the first post-war air shows, the Eerste Luchtverkeer Tentoonstelling (First Air Traffic Exhibition) held in Amsterdam in August 1919. The V.2's ability to loop on a small engine was noted. Seventy-eight V.2s were built for the Dutch government. Fifty-eight of these were for the Army Aviation Group (LVA), eighteen for the Dutch Naval Aviation Service (MLD) and two for the KNIL. There were a significant number of fatal losses in both the LVA and MLD but the V.2s were flown by both services until 1924, when the MLD replaced their V.2s with Fokker S.3s; nine of their V.2s went to the LVA.

== Specifications ==
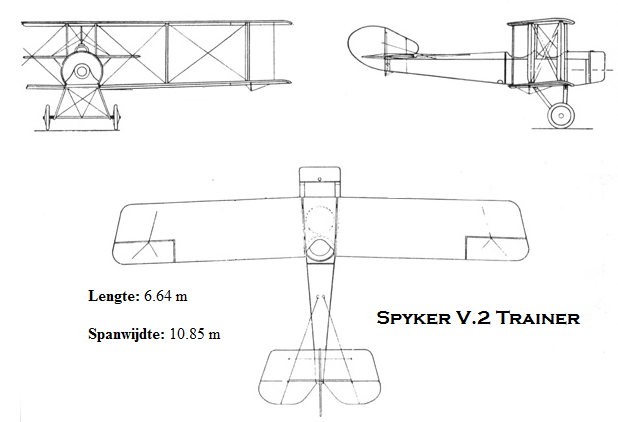
Spijker V.2 three-view drawing

Data from Jane's Fighting Aircraft of World War I

General characteristics

- Crew: Two
- Length: 6.64 m (21 ft 9 in)
- Wingspan: 10.85 m (35 ft 7 in) upper and lower wings
- Height: 3.0 m (9 ft 10 in)
- Fuel capacity: 114 L (25 imp gal; 30 US gal)
- Oil capacity: 25 L (5.5 imp gal; 6.6 US gal)
- Powerplant: 1 × Thulin A rotary engine, 60 kW (80 hp)
- Propellers: 2-bladed

Performance

- Maximum speed: 115 km/h (71 mph, 62 kn)
- Stall speed: 70 km/h (43 mph, 38 kn)
- Rate of climb: 2.1 m/s (410 ft/min)
- Wing loading: 23 kg/m^{2} (4.7 lb/sq ft)
