= Sport Copter 2 =

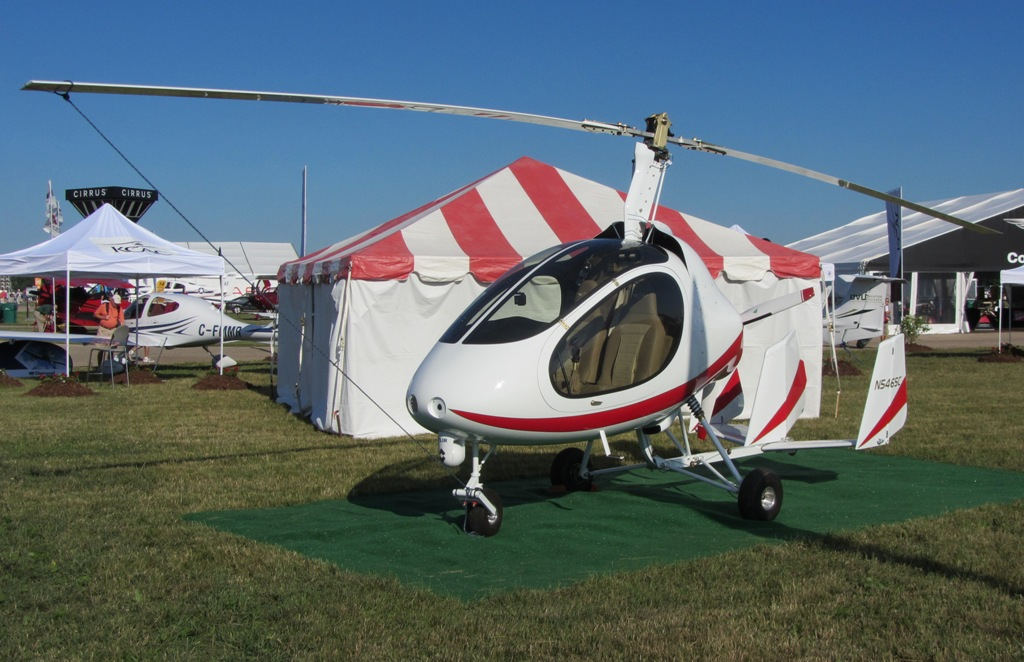

General information
- Type: Autogyro
- National origin: United States
- Manufacturer: Sport Copter

The Sport Copter 2 is an American two-seat autogyro designed and built by Sport Copter of Scappoose, Oregon. Made of bolted dural tubes and a carbon fiber shell, the Sport Copter 2 is a fully enclosed autogyro with removable doors and side-by-side seating for two. The prototype was powered by a 160 hp (119 kW) Subaru 2.2-litre 4-cylinder engine, but was subsequently upgraded to the Lycoming IO360. The Lycoming IO320 may also be fitted.

The Sport Copter 2 may be configured as either a standard category autogyro, requiring a pilot's license and FAA medical, or it may be configured with a smaller engine (IO320) and fixed-pitch propeller for operation under Light Sport rules.

The Sport Copter 2 is currently classified as an experimental aircraft, and is available in kit form. The design may be certified at an unspecified date in the future, pending availability of funds.

Originally under development in the late 1990s as a tandem-seat aircraft, the company reported three kits had been delivered by 1998.

As of May 2012, the design was being finalized for production.

== Specifications ==
Data from Sport Copter 2 specifications page

General characteristics

- Crew: 2
- Empty weight: 454 kg (1,000 lb)
- Gross weight: 771 kg (1,700 lb)
- Powerplant: 1 × Lycoming IO-360 , 160 kW (220 hp)
- Main rotor diameter: × 9.4 m (31 ft)

Performance

- Maximum speed: 190 km/h (120 mph, 100 kn)
- Cruise speed: 160 km/h (100 mph, 87 kn)
- Minimum control speed: 16 km/h (10 mph, 8.7 kn)
- Service ceiling: 5,500 m (18,000 ft)
- Rate of climb: 6.0 m/s (1,180 ft/min)

== See also ==
Related lists

- List of autogyro models
