= Sport Copter =

American helicopter manufacturer

- Company type: Private company
- Industry: Aerospace
- Headquarters: Scappoose, Oregon, United States
- Products: Autogyros
- Subsidiaries: Sport USA LLC
- Website: www.sportcopter.com

Sport Copter Inc is an American aircraft manufacturer based in Scappoose, Oregon. The company specializes in the design and manufacture of autogyros.

The company subsidiary, Sport USA, LLC, produces rotor blades.

== Aircraft ==
Summary of aircraft built by Sport Copter
| Model name | First flight | Number built | Type |
|---|---|---|---|
| Sport Copter Lightning | 1994 | | autogyro |
| Sport Copter Vortex | | | autogyro |
| Sport Copter 2 | | | autogyro |
