= Specter Aircraft Specter II =

American homebuilt aircraft

Specter II
- The prototype Specter Aircraft Specter II

General information
- Type: Homebuilt aircraft
- National origin: United States
- Manufacturer: Specter Aircraft
- Status: Production completed
- Number built: One

History
- Introduction date: 1997

The Specter Aircraft Specter II was an American homebuilt aircraft that was designed and produced by Specter Aircraft of Bancroft, Idaho, introduced in 1997. When it was available the aircraft was supplied as a kit for amateur construction.

== Design and development ==
The Specter II featured a canard configuration, a cantilever high-wing, a two-seats-in-tandem enclosed cockpit, with the pilot under a bubble canopy and the passenger supplied only with side windows. The aircraft had fixed tricycle landing gear with a retractable nosewheel and a single engine in pusher configuration. The design was stall-resistant.

The aircraft was made from composite materials. Its 34.0 ft (10.4 m) span wing, mounted wing-tip rudders and had a wing area of 147.0 sq ft (13.66 m^{2}). The cabin width was 22 in (56 cm). The design power range was 90 to 125 hp (67 to 93 kW) and the standard engine used was the 118 hp (88 kW) Subaru EA82 automotive-conversion powerplant.

The aircraft had a typical empty weight of 1,000 lb (450 kg) and a gross weight of 1,600 lb (730 kg), giving a useful load of 600 lb (270 kg). With full fuel of 23 U.S. gallons (87 L; 19 imp gal) the payload for the pilot, passenger and baggage was 462 lb (210 kg).

The fast-build kit was to include all the major structural parts bonded in place. The manufacturer estimated the construction time from the supplied kit to be 850 hours.

== Operational history ==
By 1998 the company reported that one example had been completed and was flying.

In April 2015 one example was registered in the United States with the Federal Aviation Administration, although its registration had expired in 2013. It is unlikely any examples exist today.

== Specifications (Specter II) ==
Data from AeroCrafter

General characteristics

- Crew: one
- Capacity: one passenger
- Length: 16 ft 6 in (5.03 m)
- Wingspan: 34 ft 0 in (10.36 m)
- Wing area: 147.0 sq ft (13.66 m^{2})
- Aspect ratio: 7.9:1
- Empty weight: 1,000 lb (454 kg)
- Gross weight: 1,600 lb (726 kg)
- Fuel capacity: 23 U.S. gallons (87 L; 19 imp gal)
- Powerplant: 1 × Subaru EA82 four cylinder, air-cooled, four stroke automotive conversion engine, 118 hp (88 kW)
- Propellers: 3-bladed wooden, fixed pitch

Performance

- Cruise speed: 140 mph (230 km/h, 120 kn)
- Stall speed: 54 mph (87 km/h, 47 kn)
- Wing loading: 10.9 lb/sq ft (53 kg/m^{2})
