= Sport Racer =

American amateur-built aircraft

General information
- Type: Homebuilt aircraft
- National origin: United States
- Manufacturer: Sport Racer Inc
- Status: Production completed
- Number built: At least one

The Sport Racer is an American homebuilt racing aircraft that was designed and produced by Sport Racer Inc of Valley Center, Kansas. When it was available the aircraft was supplied in the form of plans for amateur construction.

== Design and development ==
The Sport Racer features a cantilever mid-wing, a two-seats-in-tandem enclosed cockpit under a bubble canopy, fixed conventional landing gear with wheel pants and a single engine in tractor configuration.

The aircraft fuselage is made from welded 4130 steel tubing. The 22.00 ft (6.7 m) span wing has a wooden structure, covered in doped aircraft fabric and has a wing area of 81.00 sq ft (7.525 m^{2}). The standard engine used is a 230 hp (172 kW) Ford Motor Company V-6 automotive conversion powerplant.

The Sport Racer has a typical empty weight of 1,175 lb (533 kg) and a gross weight of 1,850 lb (840 kg), giving a useful load of 675 lb (306 kg). With full fuel of 30 U.S. gallons (110 L; 25 imp gal) the payload for the pilot, passenger and baggage is 495 lb (225 kg).

The standard day, sea level, no wind, take off with a 230 hp (172 kW) engine is 1,500 ft (457 m) and the landing roll is 1,600 ft (488 m).

The manufacturer estimated the construction time from the supplied plans as 1600 hours.

== Specifications (Sport Racer) ==
Data from AeroCrafter

General characteristics

- Crew: one
- Capacity: one passenger
- Length: 21.15 ft (6.45 m)
- Wingspan: 22.00 ft (6.71 m)
- Wing area: 81.00 sq ft (7.525 m^{2})
- Empty weight: 1,175 lb (533 kg)
- Gross weight: 1,850 lb (839 kg)
- Fuel capacity: 30 U.S. gallons (110 L; 25 imp gal)
- Powerplant: 1 × Ford Motor Company V-6, six cylinder, liquid-cooled, four stroke automotive conversion engine, 230 hp (170 kW)
- Propellers: 2-bladed fixed pitch

Performance

- Maximum speed: 225 mph (362 km/h, 196 kn)
- Cruise speed: 175 mph (282 km/h, 152 kn)
- Stall speed: 62 mph (100 km/h, 54 kn)
- Range: 525 mi (845 km, 456 nmi)
- Service ceiling: 18,000 ft (5,500 m)
- Rate of climb: 900 ft/min (4.6 m/s)
- Wing loading: 22.8 lb/sq ft (111 kg/m^{2})

== See also ==
- List of aerobatic aircraft
