= Spyker =

Defunct Dutch carriage, automobile and aircraft manufacturer

- The logo merging a spoke-wheel and an aircraft propeller was adopted ca. 1915
- Industry: Automotive; Aviation
- Founded: 1880; 146 years ago
- Founder: Jacobus and Hendrik-Jan Spijker
- Defunct: 1926; 100 years ago
- Fate: Bankruptcy
- Headquarters: Netherlands
- Key people: Jacobus and Hendrik-Jan Spijker, founders
- Products: hand-built coaches, carriages, cars and airplanes

Spyker or Spijker was a Dutch carriage, automobile and aircraft manufacturer, started in 1880 by blacksmiths Jacobus and Hendrik-Jan Spijker. Originally located in Hilversum, the company relocated to Trompenburg, Amsterdam in 1898.

Notable products of Spyker were building the Golden Coach for state ceremonial use for the Dutch royalty in 1898. In 1903, the Spyker 60 HP race-car was the world's first F4 layout, four-wheel drive car, featuring the first application of a six-cylinder engine, as well as the first four-wheel braking system. The 1919 C1 “Aerocoque” was one of the world's first cars with aerodynamically streamlined bodywork.

== History ==
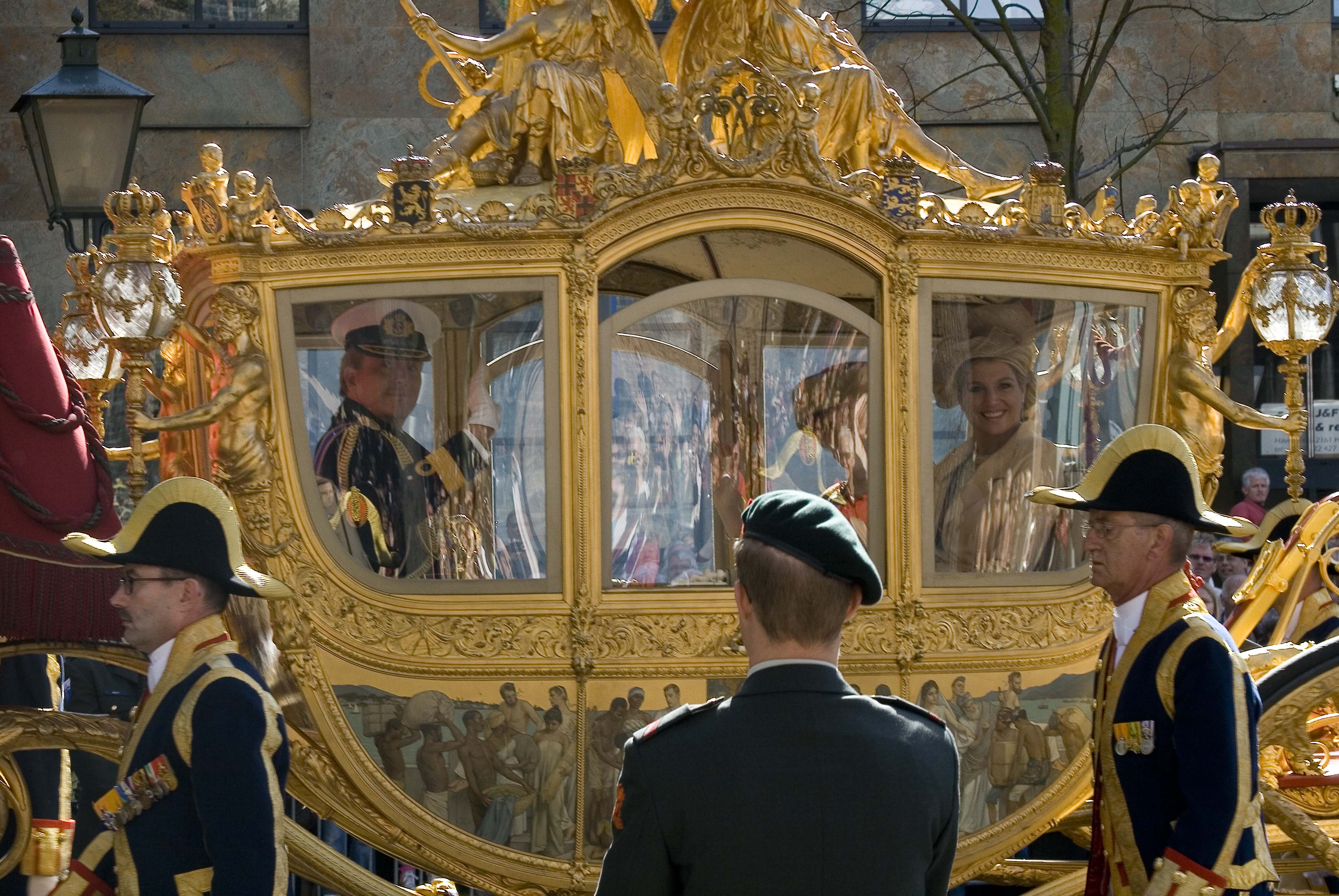
The Netherlands' royal Golden Coach (1898) with Prince Willem-Alexander, Queen Beatrix, and Princess Máxima

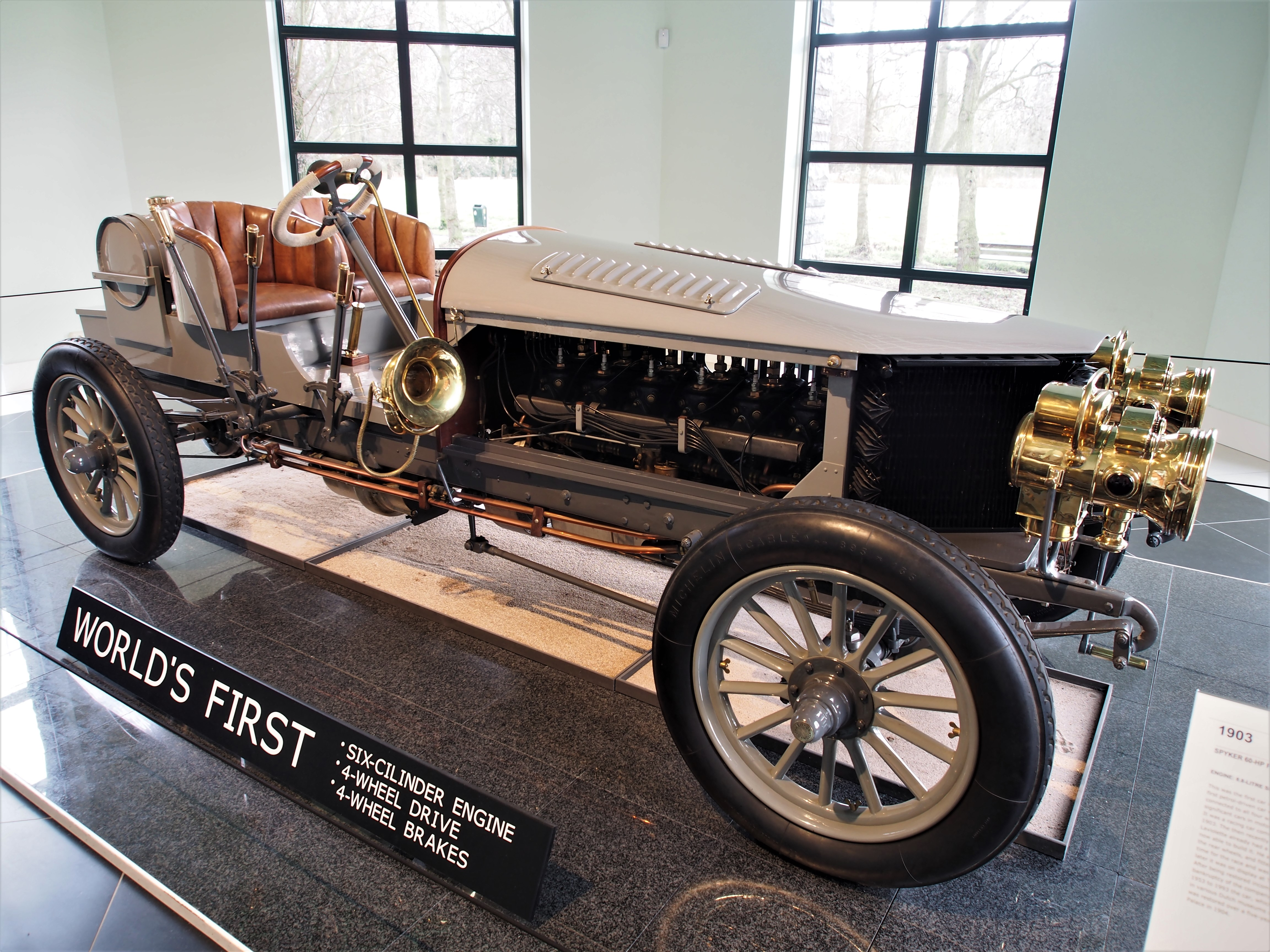
The 1903 Spyker 60HP was the world's first 4WD car, directly powered by an internal combustion engine, as well as the world's first 4WD race-car.

In 1880, Dutch brothers Hendrik Jan and Jacobus Spijker, blacksmiths by profession, start their company for building and maintaining carriages in Hilversum, The Netherlands.

In 1898, Spyker manufactured the "Golden Coach", still in use as one of the two prime ceremonial state coaches of the Dutch monarchy.

In 1899 they started building automobiles, and in 1900 put their first models on display, two-cylinder 3 hp and 5 hp similar to the Benz.

Four-cylinder models were introduced in 1903, along with the six-cylinder Spyker 60 HP, a racer which was the world's first ever four-wheel drive car with a single engine and four-wheel brakes. It was the first ever car built with front-engine, four-wheel-drive layout, and its engine with six cylinders was also a world's first.

The 1905 cars featured a round radiator grille, which became a feature of many of the pre war cars. In 1907, an 18 hp model competed in the 15,000 km Peking to Paris monster race, finishing second in the most grueling race of its time.

Hendrik-Jan Spijker died in 1907 on his return journey from England when the ferry he was on, the SS Berlin, sank, and this loss led to the bankruptcy of the original company. A group of investors bought the company and restarted production, but Jacobus Spijker was no longer involved.

In 1913, the company was having financial problems again, and in 1915 was taken over by new owners and renamed Nederlandsche Automobiel en Vliegtuigfabriek Trompenburg (Dutch Car and Aircraft company). Under the new owners, the previous complex model range was simplified and a new car, the 13/30 C1, introduced; sales were disappointing.

In 1914, Spyker merged with Dutch Aircraft Factory N.V. and the company motto became Nulla Tenaci invia est via latin for "For the tenacious no road is impassable". During World War I, in which the Netherlands were neutral, some 100 Spyker fighter aircraft and 200 aircraft engines were produced.

In 1919, after World War I, a two-seater car, the C1 "Aerocoque", featuring aerodynamically streamlined bodywork influenced by aircraft design, was shown for the first time. It was intended as a show car, but was also produced on a very limited scale. The car's bodywork, featuring swooping fenders and an aircraft-like tail, infused by the company's knowledge of aircraft aerodynamics, was mainly designed by Jaap Tjaarda van Sterkenburg, brother of John Tjaarda and uncle of Tom Tjaarda, both also car designers.

On November 27, 1920 the first Spyker 30/40HP C4 was completed, sporting a 6-cylinder Maybach engine of 5,742 cc (350.4 cu in). The car was nicknamed "Tenax" (latin for "tenacious") and improved the 15,000-mile (24,000 km) long-distance endurance record, held since 1907 by the Rolls-Royce Silver Ghost by some 6,000 km. The C4 completed 30,360 km in the Dutch winter weather in just over a month.

In 1922, racing driver Selwyn Edge took to Brooklands in a Spyker C4 fitted with streamlined racing bodywork, setting a new "Double 12" average world speed record, covering 1,782 miles (2,868 km) at an average speed of 120 km/h (75 mph) for the 24 hour aggregate of two 12-hour periods.

Also in 1922, the company went bankrupt again and was acquired by Spyker's distributor in Britain, who renamed the company Spyker Automobielfabriek. Production continued and prices dropped but the company continued to decline. Final production was of the C2 two-ton truck and the C4 car, which lasted until 1926 when funds finally ran out.

It is estimated total Spyker car production was at most 2000 cars.

In 1999, a new company, Spyker Cars, was founded, unrelated to the original company but for the brand name, motto and logo.

== License production and auto rental ==
Before Hendrik-Jan Spijker's death, he and his brother had developed a special relationship with Dutch electrical pioneer, Rento Hofstede Crull. The Spijker brothers had known Hofstede Crull already when he was a young man racing on the velocipede circuits in the Netherlands and in Germany while he was an engineering student first in Mittweida and later in Hannover at the Technische Hochschule in the 1880s. Hofstede Crull had already owned his first automobile in the 1890s. In the first decade, he had accumulated a collection of automobiles which included a number of the Spijker racing models. He housed the collection in one of the wings of the Heemaf, one of the companies he had founded. Although this was all a hobby for him initially, he began assembling Spijkers at Heemaf with the approval of the Spijker brothers and subsequently with that of those who had taken over Spijker. He provided them with improvements on the automobiles. Heemaf's board of directors complained that Hofstede Crull was using a part of the factory as his personal garage and auto park. To circumvent the criticism, he established the Spijker Automobiel Verhuur Maatschappij which along with Amsterdam's Trompenburg Bedrijf became the first auto rental companies in the Netherlands. One of his other companies was the American Refined Motor Company, which helped improve mechanical motor parts. This all stemmed from an automobile accident that he, Hofstede Crull, and his chauffeur, a man named Poorthuis, had in 1909 when he subsequently discovered a defect in the Spijker's steering mechanism which he improved.

== Car models ==
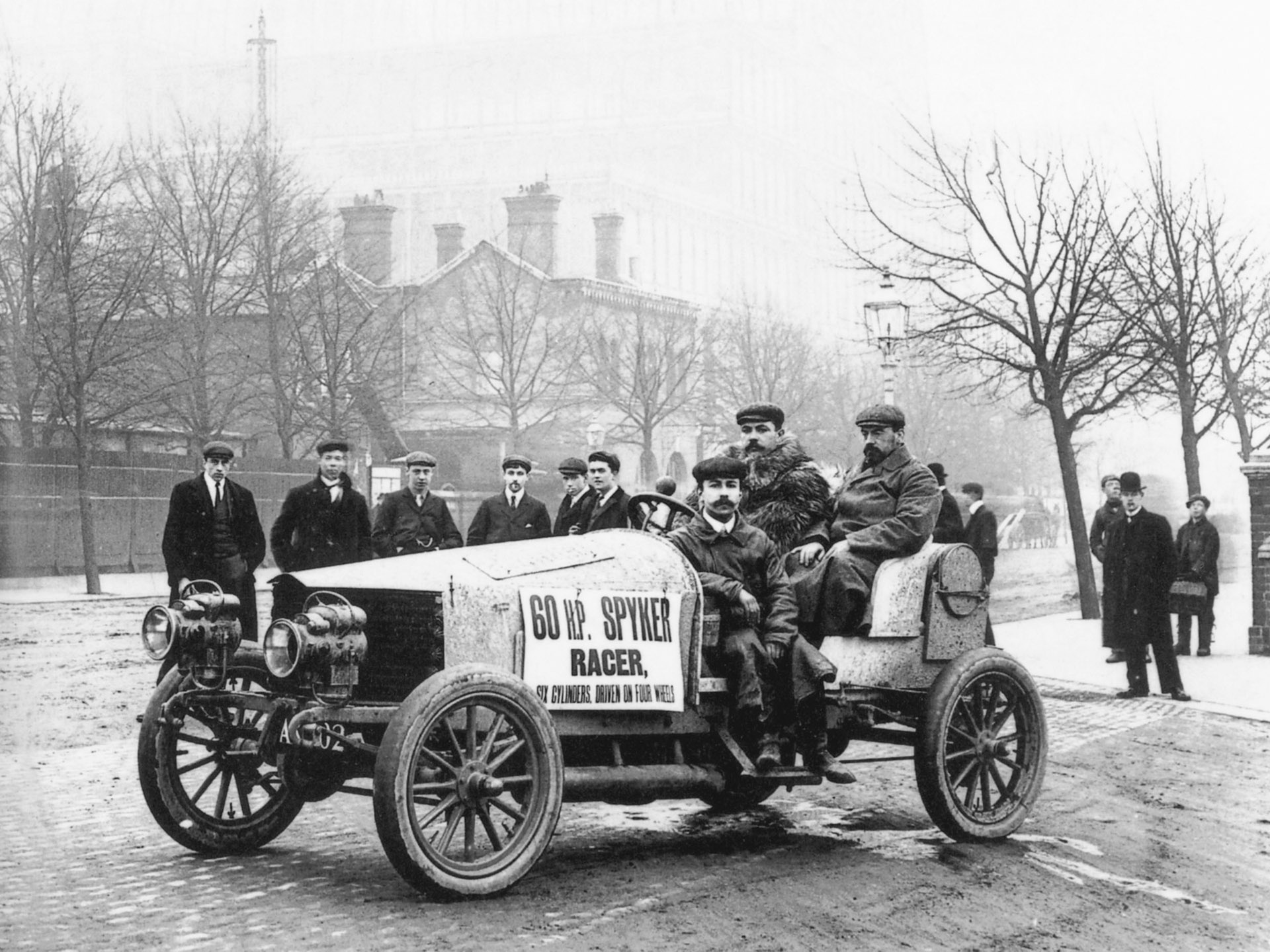
Spyker 60 HP (1903)

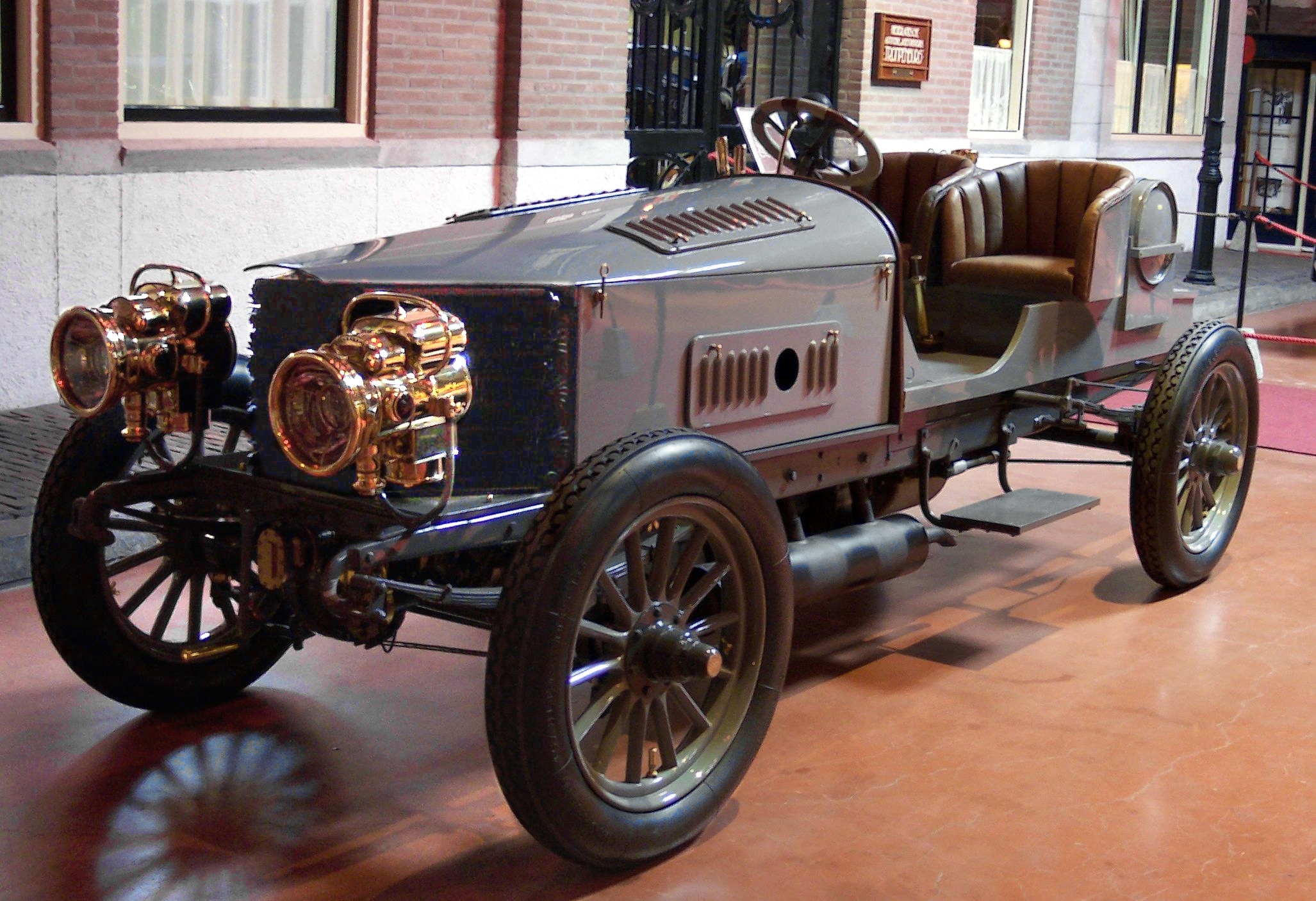
Spyker 60 HP (1903)

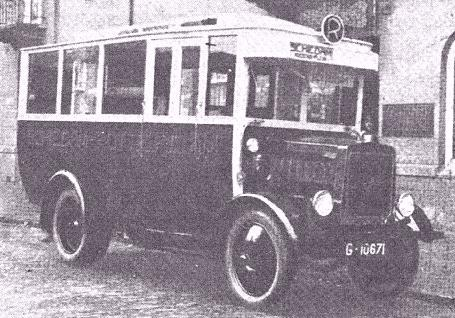
Spyker C2 truck

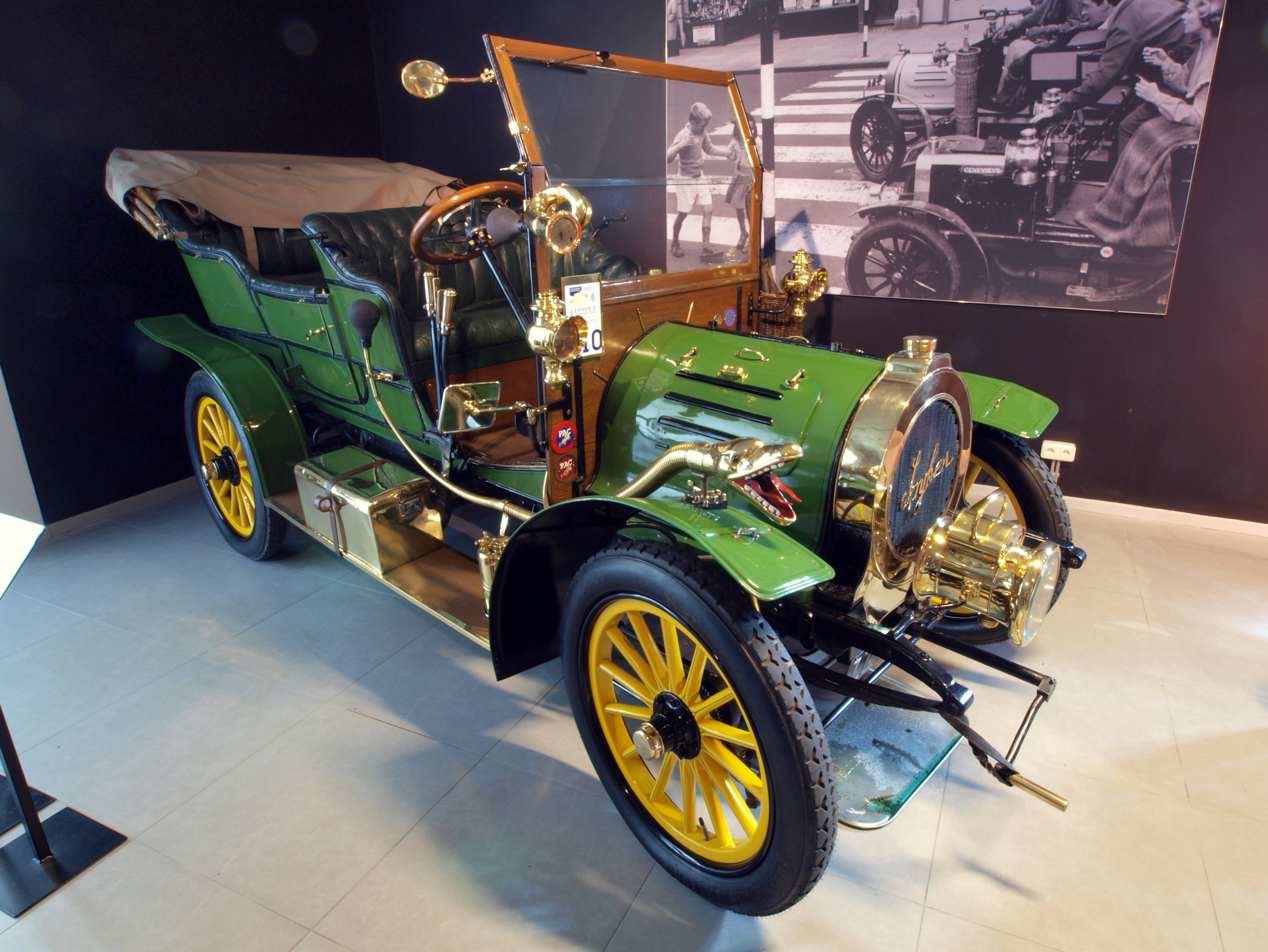
The 1905 Spyker 12/16-HP Double Phæton that was used as Ambrose Claverhouse's car in the film Genevieve. As of 2012 this car is held in the Louwman Museum in the Netherlands. A still from the film can be seen in the background

| Vehicle | Year | Details |
|---|---|---|
| Spijker 3 hp | 1900–1902 | 2-cylinder |
| Spijker 5 hp | 1900-1900 | |
| Spijker 5 hp | 1900-1900 | boxer engine |
| Spijker 6 hp | 1902-1902 | water-cooled engine. |
| Spijker 10/12 | 1903-1903 | 2-cylinder |
| Spyker 20/24 | 1903–1904 | 4-cylinder |
| Spijker 36/50 | 1903-1903 | 6-cylinder 5,073 cc (309.6 cu in) |
| Spyker 60/80 | 1903–1907 | 6-cylinder 8,821 cc (538.3 cu in) |
| Spyker 16/20 | 1903–1907 | 4-cylinder |
| Spyker 30/36 | 1903–1907 | |
| Spyker 14/18 | 1904–1907 | 4-cylinder 2,544 cc (155.2 cu in) |
| Spyker 20/28 | 1904–1907 | 4-cylinder |
| Spyker 25/36 | 1904–1905 | 4-cylinder 7,964 cc (486.0 cu in). Fourwheel drive option. |
| Spyker 32/40 | 1904–1905 | 4-cylinder. Fourwheel drive option. |
| Spyker 15/22 | 1905–1907 | 4-cylinder 3,456 cc (210.9 cu in). |
| Spyker 10/15 | 1907-1907 | 4-cylinder. |
| Spyker 15/22 | 1907-1907 | 4-cylinder 2,799 cc (170.8 cu in). |
| Spyker 20/30 | 1907-1907 | 4-cylinder 4,562 cc (278.4 cu in). |
| Spyker 30/42 | 1907-1907 | 4-cylinder 6,902 cc (421.2 cu in). |
| Spyker 40/80 | 1907-1907 | 4-cylinder 10,603 cc (647.0 cu in). |
| Spyker 15/22 | 1907–1910 | 4-cylinder 2,799 cc (170.8 cu in). |
| Spyker 60/80 | 1909-1909 | 4-cylinder. |
| Spyker 10/15 | 1910–1912 | 4-cylinder. Delivery van. |
| Spyker 15/25 | 1910–1912 | 4-cylinder. Delivery van. |
| Spyker 12 | 1910–1914 | 4-cylinder. |
| Spyker 16 | 1910–1912 | 4-cylinder. |
| Spyker 18 | 1910–1912 | 4-cylinder. |
| Spyker 25 | 1910–1912 | 4-cylinder. 4,589 cc (280.0 cu in). |
| Spyker 25/30 | 1911–1912 | 6-cylinder. |
| Spyker 20 | 1912–1916 | 4-cylinder. 3,435 cc (209.6 cu in). |
| Spyker 30 | 1912–1916 | 4-cylinder. 6,082 cc (371.1 cu in). |
| Spyker 40 | 1912–1916 | 6-cylinder. 7,238 cc (441.7 cu in). |
| Spyker 14 | 1913–1916 | 4-cylinder. |
| Spyker 12 | 1914–1916 | 4-cylinder. 1,795 cc (109.5 cu in). |
| Spyker 13/30 C1 | 1916–1921 | 4-cylinder. 3,560 cc (217 cu in). |
| Spyker 14/34 C1 | 1920–1921 | 4-cylinder. 3,562 cc (217.4 cu in). |
| Spyker C2 | 1916–1926 | 4-cylinder. 4,607 cc (281.1 cu in). Two ton truck. |
| Spyker 30/40 C4 | 1920–1926 | 6-cylinder Maybach engine. 5,742 cc (350.4 cu in). |

== Aircraft ==
- Spijker V.1 - 1917 single seat fighter
- Spijker V.2 - 1917 trainer
- Spijker V.3 - 1919 single seat fighter
- Spijker V.4 - two seat reconnaissance aircraft, construction abandoned before completion.

== Spyker on stamps and in film ==
Both Spyker brand automobiles appear on Dutch postage stamps (first day of issue: May 10, 2004).

The car driven by Kenneth More in the 1953 film Genevieve, about the London to Brighton Veteran Car Run, is a 1905 Spyker 12/16-HP Double Phaeton. The green-coloured vehicle was repainted yellow twice, first for the movie and again for the 2023 Run to commemorate the 70th anniversary of its cinematic release.

== See also ==
- Spyker Cars

== Bibliography ==
- Hazewinkel, Harm J. (October 2003). "Spijker: Le premiers Hollandais volants" [Spijker: The First Dutch Aircraft]. Le Fana de l'Aviation (in French) (407): 40–50. ISSN 0757-4169.
