= Okamura N-52 =

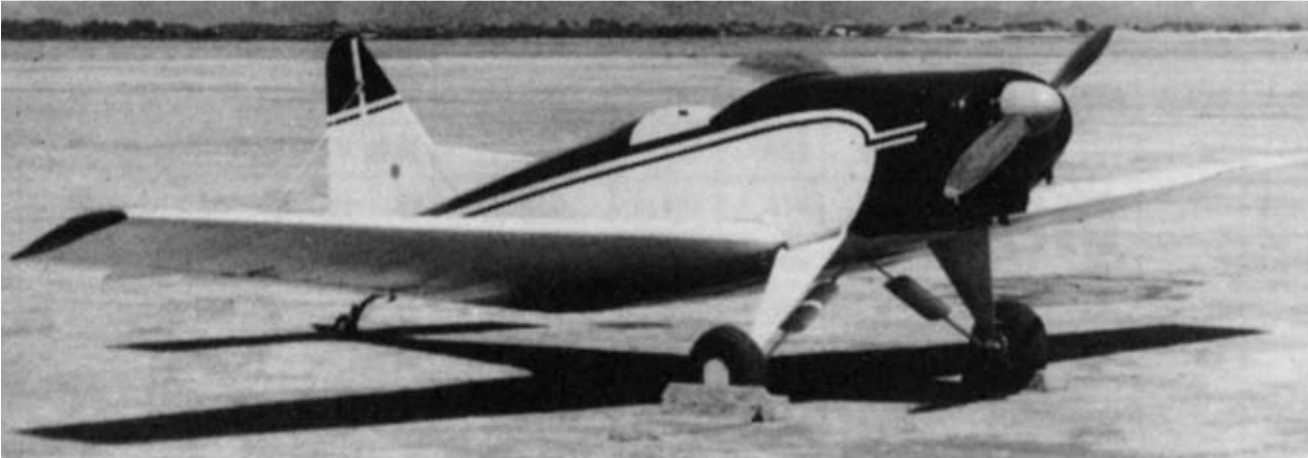

General information
- Type: Homebuilt aircraft
- National origin: Japan
- Manufacturer: Okamura Mfg. Co.
- Designer: Hidemasa Kimura, Nihon University College of Science and Engineering

History
- Introduction date: 1952
- First flight: April 7, 1953

The Okamura N-52 is a low-wing, side-by-side seating sport aircraft, that was designed in Japan by students.

== Development ==
The N-52 Started as a design experiment at Nihon University. Three test airframes were funded by Asahi Press for analysis.

== Design ==
The N-52 is powered by a Continental A-65 engine. The aircraft features a single open cockpit with side-by-side seating and a taildragger landing gear. The aircraft was designed to accommodate up to 100 hp (75 kW) engines. Controllability with a 65 hp (48 kW) engine was considered sluggish.

== Specifications (Okamura N-52) ==
Data from Sport Aviation

General characteristics

- Crew: one
- Capacity: one passenger
- Length: 5.99 m (19 ft 8 in)
- Wingspan: 8.61 m (28 ft 3 in)
- Height: 2.59 m (8 ft 6 in)
- Wing area: 12.0 m^{2} (129 sq ft)
- Empty weight: 299 kg (660 lb)
- Gross weight: 499 kg (1,100 lb)
- Powerplant: 1 × Continental A-65 air-cooled four-cylinder horizontally-opposed engine, 48 kW (65 hp)

Performance

- Maximum speed: 180 km/h (110 mph, 96 kn)
- Stall speed: 79 km/h (49 mph, 43 kn)
- Rate of climb: 2.8 m/s (550 ft/min)

== See also ==
Aircraft of comparable role, configuration, and era

- Spartan C2
