= Sport Copter Lightning =

Lightning
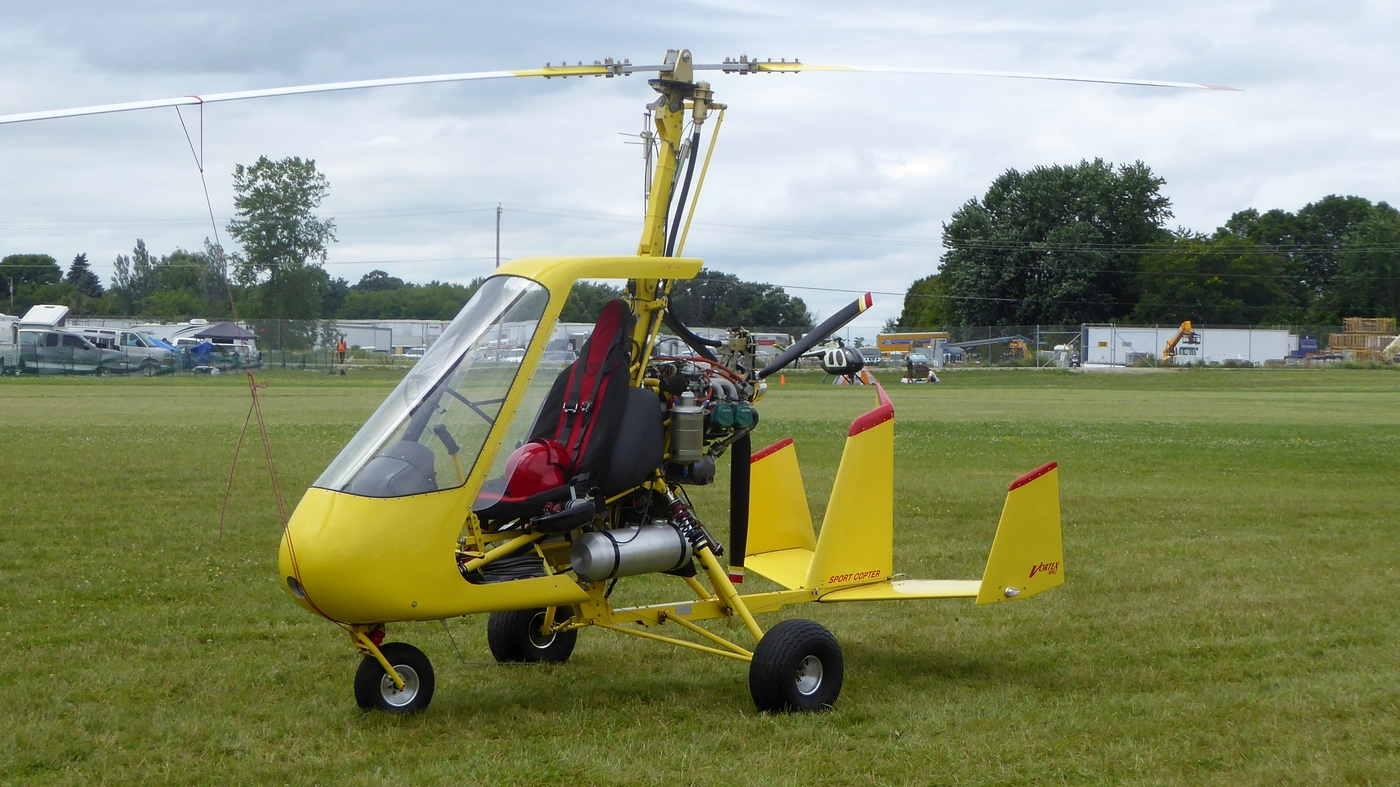
- Vortex M912

General information
- Type: Autogyro
- National origin: United States
- Manufacturer: Sport Copter
- Status: In production

History
- Introduction date: 1994

The Sport Copter Lightning is an American autogyro, designed and produced by Sport Copter of Scappoose, Oregon. The aircraft is supplied as a kit for amateur construction.

== Design and development ==
The base model Lightning was designed to comply with the US FAR 103 Ultralight Vehicles rules, including the category's maximum empty weight of 254 lb (115 kg). The aircraft has a standard empty weight of 252 lb (114 kg). It features a single main rotor, a single-seat open cockpit without a windshield, tricycle landing gear and a twin cylinder, air-cooled, two-stroke, single-ignition 50 hp (37 kW) Rotax 503 engine in pusher configuration.

The aircraft fuselage is made from bolted-together aluminum tubing. Its 23 ft (7.0 m) diameter rotor is supplied ready-made and constructed from bonded dural aluminum by the company's subsidiary Sport USA LLC. The landing gear includes telescopic spring suspension. A semi-enclosed cockpit fairing with windshield is optional.

The basic Lightning design has been developed into the heavier Vortex.

Reviewer Andre Cliche said of the Lightning: "In flight, the Lightning is forgiving and easy to maneuver, with light, geared-down controls. It is responsive but not tricky. It is a good choice for beginners."

== Variants ==
Lightning
Base model powered by a 50 hp (37 kW) Rotax 503 engine. Can accept engines from 46 to 70 hp (34 to 52 kW). Optional cockpit fairing. 53 examples had been completed and flown by 2005.
Vortex
Improved model powered by a 64 hp (48 kW) Rotax 582 or 80 hp (60 kW) Rotax 912UL engine. Can accept engines from 65 to 210 hp (48 to 157 kW). Empty weight is 350 lb (159 kg) and gross weight is 760 lb (345 kg). Cockpit fairing is standard. 124 examples had been completed and flown by 2005.
Vortex M912
A strengthened rough-field version originally designed for Australian cattle mustering, (the M stands for Mustering), equipped with a Rotax 912 ULS engine.

== Specifications (Lightning) ==
Data from Cliche and KitPlanes

General characteristics

- Crew: one
- Length: 11 ft 0 in (3.35 m)
- Height: 8 ft 0 in (2.44 m)
- Empty weight: 252 lb (114 kg)
- Gross weight: 600 lb (272 kg)
- Fuel capacity: 5 U.S. gallons (19 L; 4.2 imp gal)
- Powerplant: 1 × Rotax 503 twin cylinder, air-cooled, two-stroke dual-ignition aircraft engine, 50 hp (37 kW)
- Main rotor diameter: 23 ft 0 in (7.01 m)
- Main rotor area: 415 sq ft (38.6 m^{2})

Performance

- Maximum speed: 63 mph (101 km/h, 55 kn)
- Cruise speed: 55 mph (89 km/h, 48 kn)
- Range: 100 mi (160 km, 87 nmi)
- Service ceiling: 14,000 ft (4,300 m)
- Rate of climb: 1,000 ft/min (5.1 m/s)
