= Sperry Land and Sea Triplane =

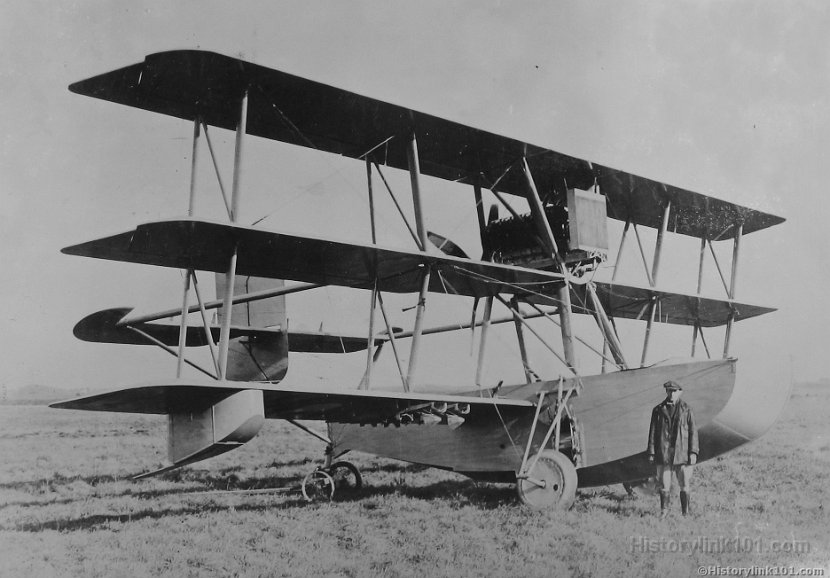

General information
- Type: Bomber, Reconnaissance
- National origin: United States
- Manufacturer: Sperry Aircraft
- Designer: Alfred Verville
- Number built: 2

History
- First flight: November 1918

The Sperry Land and Sea Triplane was an American three seat amphibious aircraft designed as a coastal reconnaissance/bomber. Two examples were built and tested for the U.S. Navy towards the end of the First World War. The machine performed well on land and water, but no orders were placed.

== Design and development ==
Aircraft designer and aviation pioneer Alfred Verville working with Lawrence Sperry, conceived the aircraft to perform a similar role as the Curtiss HS series of flying boats, with the added ability to operate from land bases. The machine was an equal span two bay triplane with N-type interplane struts of all wood construction. Power was provided by a 400 hp (300 kW) Liberty L-12 water cooled engine turning a four bladed fixed wooden propeller in a pusher configuration.

The outrigger style empennage consisted of a single large vertical stabilizer and tailplane connected to the center main wing with two horizontal tubular spars. Two vertical struts were attached to the aft end of each tube spar and met at the extreme rear of the fuselage forming a very robust triangular structure. The high mounting of the tail was designed to prevent damage in heavy seas. When operating on the water with the engine off, the craft was much more seaworthy running "backwards" into the wind due to its hull design. Because of this, a unique tailskid could be folded down into a vertical drag position to make the machine lie tail into the wind.

The retractable hand-operated main landing gear pivoted upward to allow take offs and landings on water and the 360 lb (163 kg) wheel assemblies could also be jettisoned after takeoff, increasing range and performance, but necessitating a water landing. The Sperry Land and Sea Triplane was one of the first American aircraft to make use of retractable landing gear, developed by Sperry in 1915.

== Specifications ==
Data from Aviation and Aircraft Journal

General characteristics

- Crew: Three
- Length: 31 ft 6 in (9.60 m)
- Wingspan: 48 ft 0 in (14.63 m)
- Height: 15 ft 4 in (4.67 m)
- Wing area: 678 sq ft (63.0 m^{2})
- Empty weight: 3,711 lb (1,683 kg)
- Gross weight: 5,976 lb (2,711 kg)
- Fuel capacity: 135 gal.
- Powerplant: 1 × Liberty L-12 V 12 water cooled, 400 hp (300 kW)

Performance

- Maximum speed: 91 mph (146 km/h, 79 kn)
- Cruise speed: 85 mph (137 km/h, 74 kn)
- Wing loading: 8.8 lb/sq ft (43 kg/m^{2}) max load

== See also ==
- List of flying boats and floatplanes
- Flying boat
