= Spartan DFD Aerotome =

American ultralight airplane

General information
- Type: Ultralight trike
- National origin: United States
- Manufacturer: Spartan Microlights
- Status: Production completed
- Number built: 30 (February 2000)

The Spartan DFD Aerotome, or DFS Aerotome Dual, is an American two-seat ultralight trike that was designed and produced by Spartan Microlights.

== Design and development ==
The aircraft was designed as a US FAR 103 Ultralight Vehicles rules two-seat trainer. It features a cable-braced hang glider-style high-wing, weight-shift controls, a two-seats-in-tandem open cockpit, tricycle landing gear and a single engine in pusher configuration.

The aircraft is made from bolted-together aluminum tubing, with its single surface wing covered in Dacron sailcloth. Its 36 ft (11.0 m) span wing is supported by a single tube-type kingpost and uses an "A" frame control bar. Unlike the Spartan DFS Trike the Aerotome uses only a trike delta wing and cannot be converted for powered parachute use.

The standard engine supplied was the twin cylinder, two-stroke, air-cooled 50 hp (37 kW) Rotax 503, with a 5 U.S. gallons (19 L; 4.2 imp gal) fuel tank. When in production it came with optional dual controls, aero-towing hardware, larger engines and 10 U.S. gallons (38 L; 8.3 imp gal) fuel tank. Thirty had been completed and flown by February 2000.

== Specifications (Aerotome) ==
Data from Kitplanes

General characteristics

- Crew: one
- Capacity: one passenger
- Length: 7 ft (2.1 m)
- Wingspan: 36 ft (11 m)
- Height: 7 ft (2.1 m)
- Wing area: 190 sq ft (18 m^{2})
- Empty weight: 248 lb (112 kg)
- Gross weight: 750 lb (340 kg)
- Fuel capacity: 5 U.S. gallons (19 L; 4.2 imp gal) standard
- Powerplant: 1 × Rotax 503 twin cylinder, two-stroke, air-cooled aircraft engine, 50 hp (37 kW)

Performance

- Cruise speed: 44 mph (71 km/h, 38 kn)
- Service ceiling: 15,000 ft (4,600 m)
- Rate of climb: 1,500 ft/min (7.6 m/s)
