= Specter Aircraft =

American aircraft manufacturer

Specter Aircraft, Inc.
- Company type: Privately held company
- Industry: Aerospace
- Founded: 23 July 1997
- Defunct: 17 February 2000
- Fate: Out of business
- Headquarters: Bancroft, Idaho, United States
- Key people: James D Gessford
- Products: Kit aircraft

Specter Aircraft, Inc. was an American aircraft manufacturer, founded by James D Gessford in 1997 and based in Bancroft, Idaho. The company specialized in the design and manufacture of light aircraft in the form of kits for amateur construction.

The company was incorporated on 23 July 1997 and had its status administratively revoked on 17 February 2000.

The company was formed to develop and market the Specter II, a canard configuration two-seat aircraft intended to be sold in kit form. Federal Aviation Administration records indicate that only one was built.

== Aircraft ==
Summary of aircraft built by Specter Aircraft
Model name	First flight	Number built	Type
Specter Aircraft Specter II	1997	One	Homebuilt aircraft
