= Sperwill Ltd =

British aircraft manufacturer

- Company type: Privately held company
- Industry: Aerospace
- Founded: c. 2001
- Defunct: c. 2009
- Fate: Out of business
- Headquarters: Bristol, United Kingdom
- Key people: Riann Oliver
- Products: Paramotors

Sperwill Ltd (sometimes Sperwill Aviation) was a British aircraft manufacturer based in Bristol and founded by Riann Oliver. The company specialized in the design and manufacture of paramotors in the form of ready-to-fly aircraft for the US FAR 103 Ultralight Vehicles rules and the European microlight category.

The company seems to have been founded about 2001 and gone out of business in 2009.

The company built a wide range of paramotors noted for their ability to be completely dismantled for ground transport. Each model used a different engine, while retaining similar frame features.

== Aircraft ==
Summary of aircraft built by Sperwill Ltd
Model name	First flight	Number built	Type
Sperwill 120	mid-2000s		paramotor
Sperwill 2+	mid-2000s		paramotor
Sperwill 3+	mid-2000s		paramotor
Sperwill 210	mid-2000s		paramotor
Sperwill TX	mid-2000s		paramotor
Sperwill CA	mid-2000s		paramotor
Sperwill ST	mid-2000s		paramotor
