= Spring WS202 Sprint =

Canadian homebuilt light aircraft

WS202 Sprint

General information
- Type: Homebuilt aircraft
- National origin: Canada
- Manufacturer: William J. Spring
- Designer: William J. Spring
- Status: Production completed (1996)
- Number built: One

History
- Introduction date: 1996
- First flight: 1996

The Spring WS202 Sprint was a Canadian homebuilt aircraft that was designed and produced by William J. Spring of Burlington, Ontario, introduced in 1996. The aircraft was supplied in the form of plans for amateur construction.

== Design and development ==
The WS202 Sprint featured a cantilever low-wing, a two-seats-in-side-by-side configuration enclosed cockpit under a bubble canopy, fixed tricycle landing gear or conventional landing gear and a single engine in tractor configuration.

The aircraft was made from sheet aluminum. Its 27.0 ft (8.2 m) span wing, mounted flaps and had a wing area of 130 sq ft (12 m^{2}). The cabin width was 45 in (110 cm). The design power range was 65 to 100 hp (48 to 75 kW) and the engine used in the prototype was a 65 hp (48 kW) Subaru EA81 automotive conversion powerplant.

The aircraft was designed to be constructed from plans and emphasized economy. The designer claimed it could be constructed for US$5000 in 1996, including a second hand Subaru engine. It was designed to be easy to convert between tricycle and conventional landing gear.

The aircraft had a typical empty weight of 670 lb (300 kg) and a gross weight of 1,150 lb (520 kg), giving a useful load of 480 lb (220 kg). With full fuel of 14 U.S. gallons (53 L; 12 imp gal) the payload for the pilot, passenger and baggage was 396 lb (180 kg).

The standard day, sea level, no wind, take off and landing roll with a 65 hp (48 kW) engine was 500 ft (152 m).

The manufacturer estimated the construction time from the supplied plans as 1500 hours.

== Operational history ==
The prototype was displayed at AirVenture in Oshkosh, Wisconsin in 1996.

By 1998 the designer reported that one aircraft had been completed and was flying.

In April 2015 one example had been registered with Transport Canada to the designer, William J. Spring, although its registration was cancelled on 13 February 2013. It is unlikely that the aircraft exists any more.

== Specifications (WS202 Sprint) ==
Data from AeroCrafter

General characteristics

- Crew: one
- Capacity: one passenger
- Length: 19 ft 0 in (5.79 m)
- Wingspan: 27 ft 0 in (8.23 m)
- Wing area: 130 sq ft (12 m^{2})
- Aspect ratio: 5.6:1
- Empty weight: 670 lb (304 kg)
- Gross weight: 1,150 lb (522 kg)
- Fuel capacity: 14 U.S. gallons (53 L; 12 imp gal)
- Powerplant: 1 × Subaru EA81 four cylinder, air-cooled, four stroke automotive conversion engine, 65 hp (48 kW)
- Propellers: 2-bladed wooden, fixed pitch

Performance

- Cruise speed: 105 mph (169 km/h, 91 kn)
- Stall speed: 37 mph (60 km/h, 32 kn) flaps down
- Never exceed speed: 150 mph (240 km/h, 130 kn)
- Range: 400 mi (640 km, 350 nmi)
- Service ceiling: 10,000 ft (3,000 m)
- Rate of climb: 500 ft/min (2.5 m/s)
- Wing loading: 8.8 lb/sq ft (43 kg/m^{2})
