= Spartan C5 =

Passenger and utility aircraft produced in the United States in the early 1930s

C5

General information
- Type: utility aircraft
- National origin: United States
- Manufacturer: Spartan Aircraft Company
- Number built: 4

History
- First flight: 1930
- Developed from: Spartan C4

The Spartan C5 was a passenger and utility aircraft produced in small numbers in the United States in the early 1930s. It was a further, ultimately unsuccessful, attempt to market the Spartan C4, from which it was developed. Like its predecessor, the C5 was a high-wing, strut-braced monoplane with a fully enclosed cabin. Seating was increased to five places in place of the four seats of the C4. The C5 also incorporated a number of aerodynamic refinements, including a closely cowled engine and spatted mainwheels. The fuselage was constructed of welded steel tube and the wings from wood, and the whole aircraft covered in fabric. The empennage was also mostly constructed from wood, with metal ribs used in the fin and the whole assembly also covered in fabric.

Spartan was unable to sell the aircraft in any quantity, and eventually, built only four examples, including the prototype.

== Variants ==
- C5-300 — version with Wright J-6 engine (3 built)
- C5-301 — version with Pratt & Whitney Wasp Junior engine (1 built)

== Specifications (C5-301) ==
Data from Aero Digest

General characteristics

- Crew: one pilot
- Capacity: four passengers
- Length: 32 ft 8 in (9.95 m)
- Wingspan: 50 ft 0 in (15.24 m)
- Height: 8 ft 11 in (2.72 m)
- Wing area: 299 sq ft (27.8 m^{2})
- Empty weight: 2,632 lb (1,196 kg)
- Gross weight: 4,175 lb (1,898 kg)
- Powerplant: 1 × Pratt & Whitney R-985 Wasp Junior , 320 hp (240 kW)

Performance

- Maximum speed: 145 mph (232 km/h, 126 kn)
- Range: 648 mi (1,040 km, 563 nmi)
- Service ceiling: 14,600 ft (4,450 m)
- Rate of climb: 940 ft/min (4.8 m/s)
