= Spartan Microlights =

American aircraft manufacturer

- Company type: Privately held company
- Industry: Aerospace
- Fate: Company for sale (February 2015)
- Headquarters: Astoria, New York, United States
- Products: Powered parachutes, ultralight trikes, powered paragliders
- Website: www.flyforfun.net

Spartan Microlights is an American aircraft manufacturer based in Astoria, New York. The company specializes in the design and manufacture of powered parachutes, ultralight trikes and powered paragliders in the form of ready-to-fly aircraft in the US FAR 103 Ultralight Vehicles rules and kits for the US Experimental - Amateur-built category.

In February 2015 the company was listed as being for sale.

The company offers several different lines of aircraft. The "DFS" line, for "Dual Face System", is a line of aircraft that can be flown with either a paraglider wing or a hang glider wing and includes the Spartan DFS Paramotor and Spartan DFS Trike. The Spartan DFD Aerotome is a two-seat ultralight trike design, that is also called the DFS Aerotome Dual. The Spartan BP Parawing is a one or two seat powered paraglider design.

== Aircraft ==
Summary of aircraft built by Spartan Microlights
| Model name | First flight | Number built | Type |
|---|---|---|---|
| Spartan DFS Paramotor | | | Single-seat convertible powered paraglider or hang glider |
| Spartan DFD Aerotome | | | Two seat ultralight trike |
| Spartan DFS Trike | | | Single-seat convertible ultralight trike or powered parachute |
| Spartan BP Parawing | | | Single or two-seat powered parachute |
