= Spartan C2 =

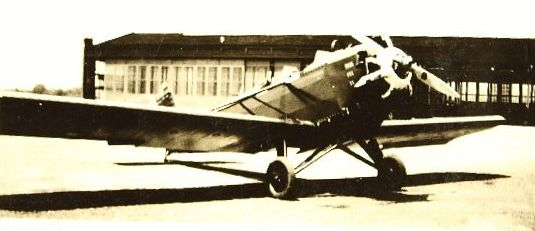

General information
- Type: sport aircraft
- National origin: United States
- Manufacturer: Spartan Aircraft Company
- Designer: Willis Brown
- Number built: over 56

History
- First flight: 1931

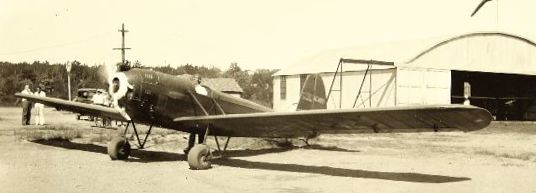
Jacobs L-3-powered Spartan C2-60

The Spartan C2 is a light aircraft produced in the United States in the early 1930s as a low-cost sport machine that would sell during the Great Depression.

== Design and development ==
The C2 is a conventional, low-wing monoplane design with two seats side-by-side in an open cockpit. The wing was braced with struts and wires and it carried the main units of the divided fixed undercarriage. Power was supplied by a small radial engine mounted tractor-fashion in the nose, which drove a two-bladed propeller.

Spartan introduced the C2 in 1931 with a 55-hp engine, and sold 16 examples before ongoing economic circumstances brought production to a halt. Spartan then built 2 examples with 165-hp engines to use in their own flying school. These latter aircraft were fitted with hoods that could be closed over the cockpit for training pilots in instrument flying. Spartan offered this version to the U.S. military as a trainer, but officials at the time believed that low-wing monoplanes were unsuitable for pilot training. Spartan also tendered a proposal to the U.S. Bureau of Air Commerce to provide its inspectors with a two-seat light aircraft. The design in question was probably the C2-60, but in any case, the tender was not accepted.

== Variants ==
- C2-60 — initial production version with 55–60 hp (41–45 kW) Jacobs L-3 engine (16 built)
- C2-165 — trainer with 165 hp (123 kW) Wright J-5 engine and hood for instrument training for Spartan School of Aeronautics (2 built)

== Operators ==
- Spartan School of Aeronautics (2 × C2-165)

== Aircraft on display ==
Three C2s are preserved in museums — a restored example on display at the Tulsa Air and Space Museum, a restored and flyable example at the Western Antique Aeroplane & Automobile Museum in Hood River, Oregon, and an example awaiting restoration at the Golden Wings Flying Museum, Blaine, Minnesota.

== Specifications (C2-60) ==
Data from Jane's all the World's Aircraft 1931, Aerofiles: Spartan

General characteristics

- Crew: 1
- Capacity: 1 pax
- Length: 22 ft 5.25 in (6.8390 m)
- Wingspan: 40 ft (12 m)
- Height: 6 ft 11.5 in (2.121 m)
- Wing area: 161.8 sq ft (15.03 m^{2})
- Airfoil: Clark Y
- Empty weight: 684 lb (310 kg)
- Gross weight: 1,125 lb (510 kg)
- Fuel capacity: Fuel:15 US gal (12 imp gal; 57 L); Oil:1.5 US gal (1.2 imp gal; 5.7 L)
- Powerplant: 1 × Jacobs L-3 3-cylinder air-cooled radial piston engine, 60 hp (45 kW)
- Propellers: 2-bladed metal propeller

Performance

- Maximum speed: 95 mph (153 km/h, 83 kn)
- Cruise speed: 80 mph (130 km/h, 70 kn) </li.
- Landing speed: 39 mph (34 kn; 63 km/h)
- Range: 320 mi (510 km, 280 nmi)
- Service ceiling: 13,000 ft (4,000 m) service
- Rate of climb: 800 ft/min (4.1 m/s) initial
- Wing loading: 6.96 lb/sq ft (34.0 kg/m^{2})
- Power/mass: 18.756 lb/hp (11.409 kg/kW)

== See also ==
Aircraft of comparable role, configuration, and era

- Aeronca C-2
- American Eagle Eaglet
- Curtiss-Wright Junior
- Okamura N-52
- Rearwin Junior
