= Spartan C4 =

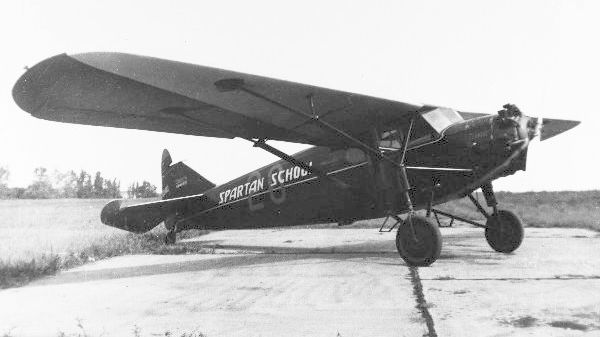

General information
- Type: Four-seat cabin monoplane
- National origin: United States
- Manufacturer: Spartan Aircraft Company
- Number built: 7

History
- First flight: 1930
- Developed into: Spartan C5

The Spartan C4 was an American four-seat cabin monoplane designed and built by the Spartan Aircraft Company.

== Design and development ==
The first model was the C4-225 a high-wing braced monoplane powered by a 225 hp (168 kW) Wright J-6 radial engine. Only five C4-235 aircraft were built and they were followed by one C4-300 with a 300 hp (220 kW) Wright R-975 radial engine, and the C4-301 with a 300 hp (220 kW) Pratt & Whitney Wasp Junior.

== Variants ==
C4-225
Production aircraft powered by a 225 hp (168 kW) Wright J-6 radial engine, five built.
C4-300
Variant with a 300 hp (220 kW) Wright R-975 radial engine, one built.
C4-301
Variant with a 300 hp (220 kW) Pratt & Whitney Wasp Junior radial engine, one built.

== Specifications (C4-225) ==
Data from Jane's all the World's Aircraft 1931

General characteristics

- Crew: One or Two
- Capacity: 2 or 3 passengers, (four seats total)
- Length: 50 ft (15 m)
- Wingspan: 32 ft 3.75 in (9.8489 m)
- Height: 9 ft (2.7 m)
- Wing area: 299 sq ft (27.8 m^{2})
- Empty weight: 2,325 lb (1,055 kg)
- Gross weight: 3,515 lb (1,594 kg)
- Fuel capacity: 85 US gal (320 L; 71 imp gal) in two wing tanks;
- Oil capacity: 6 US gal (23 L; 5.0 imp gal)
- Powerplant: 1 × Wright J-6 9-cylinder air-cooled radial piston engine, 240 hp (180 kW)
- Propellers: 2-bladed fixed pitch steel propeller

Performance

- Maximum speed: 129.7 mph (208.7 km/h, 112.7 kn)
- Cruise speed: 109 mph (175 km/h, 95 kn)
- Landing speed: 51 mph (82 km/h)
- Service ceiling: 15,000 ft (4,600 m) service
- Rate of climb: 905 ft/min (4.60 m/s) initial
- Wing loading: 11.7 lb/sq ft (57 kg/m^{2})
- Power/mass: 14.65 lb/hp (8.91 kg/kW)

== See also ==
Related development

- Spartan C5
