= Arboretum Trompenburg =

Coordinates: 51°55′10″N 4°31′6″E

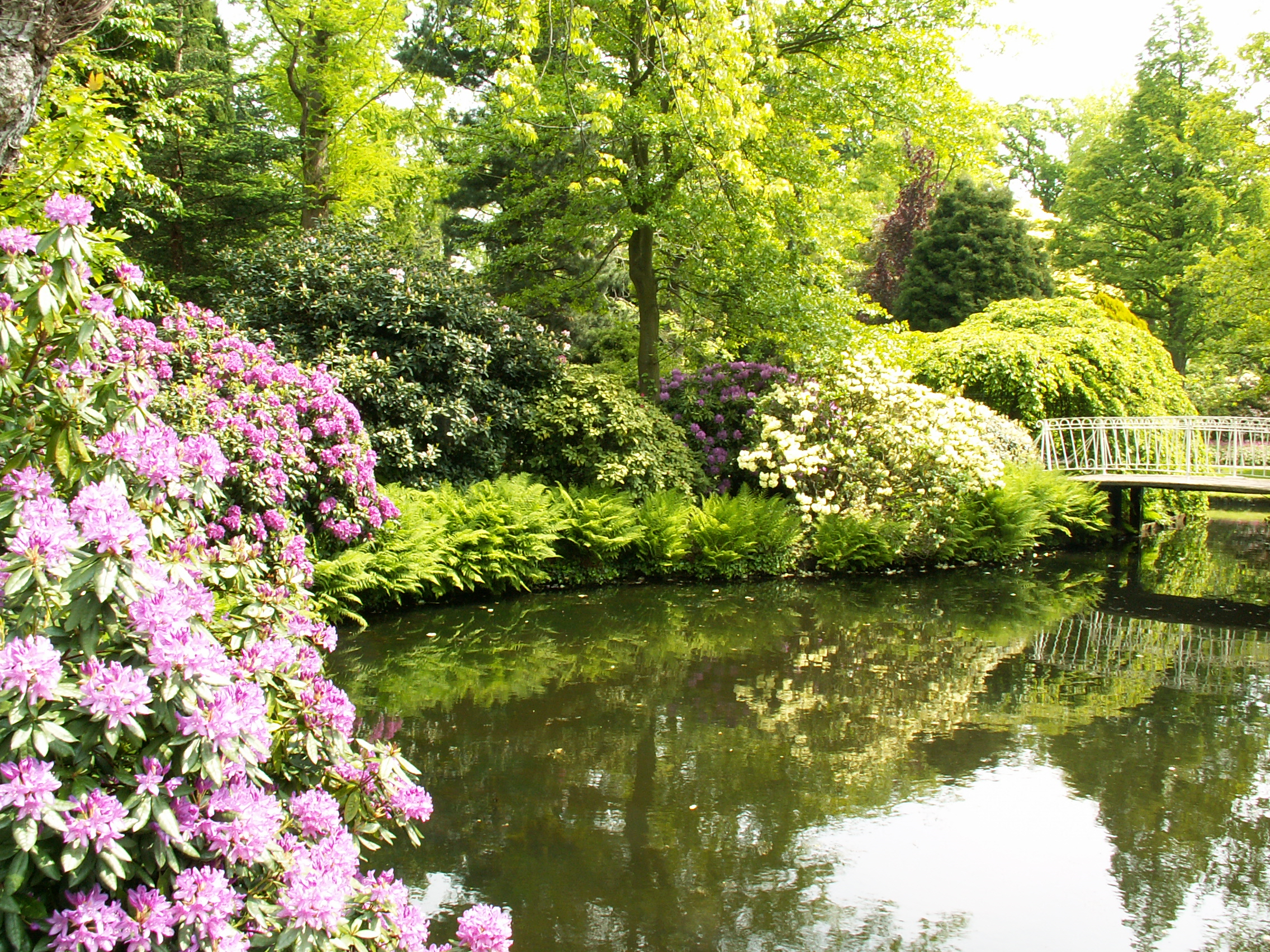
Rhododendrons and other plants along a pond at the Arboretum Trompenburg

Arboretum Trompenburg is a botanical garden in Rotterdam, Netherlands, which hosts a large collection of woody as well as herbaceous plants. It occupies an area of 7 ha and is situated 4 m below sea level, so a system of canals is used to drain the land. The history of the garden dates back to the 19th century. Since 1958 it has been open to the public daily for a small fee. Arboretum Trompenburg holds national plant collections of conifers, Quercus, Fagus, Rhododendron, Ligustrum, Rodgersia and Hosta.
