= Spartan DFS Trike =

American ultralight airplane

DFS Trike

General information
- Type: Ultralight trike and powered parachute
- National origin: United States
- Manufacturer: Spartan Microlights
- Status: In production

The Spartan DFS Trike is an American ultralight aircraft designed and produced by Spartan Microlights. The aircraft was the first ultralight introduced that could be flown with a hang glider-style wing as an ultralight trike or with a powered parachute wing.

The designation of DFS stands for Dual Face System, referring to its ability to mount either hang glider or powered parachute wings.

== Design and development ==
The aircraft was designed to comply with the US FAR 103 Ultralight Vehicles rules, including the category's maximum empty weight of 254 lb (115 kg). The aircraft has a standard empty weight of 212 lb (96 kg) with a Daedalus 190 hang glider wing. It features a cable-braced hang glider-style high-wing, weight-shift controls, a single-seat open cockpit, tricycle landing gear and a single engine in pusher configuration. In powered parachute mode it uses a Shuttle GRX canopy and is controlled with aerodynamic brakes.

The aircraft fuselage is made from aluminum tubing, while the hang glider wing is made from bolted-together aluminum tubing and covered in Dacron sailcloth. The hang glider wing is supported by a single tube-type kingpost and uses an "A" frame control bar. A fiberglass cockpit fairing, windshield, brakes and floats are optional. The original engine supplied was the Rotax 277 single cylinder, two-stroke, air-cooled aircraft engine of 28 hp (21 kW), which is now out-of-production. Present engines available include the 28 hp (21 kW) Zanzottera MZ 34, 28 hp (21 kW) Hirth F-33 and the 40 hp (30 kW) Rotax 447.

In 2012 the aircraft was marketed under the name DFS Single.

== Specifications (DFS with hang glider wing) ==
Data from Cliche

General characteristics

- Crew: one
- Wing area: 199 sq ft (18.5 m^{2})
- Empty weight: 212 lb (96 kg)
- Gross weight: 462 lb (210 kg)
- Fuel capacity: 5 U.S. gallons (19 L; 4.2 imp gal)
- Powerplant: 1 × Rotax 277 single cylinder, two-stroke, air-cooled aircraft engine, 28 hp (21 kW)

Performance

- Cruise speed: 34 mph (55 km/h, 30 kn)
- Rate of climb: 900 ft/min (4.6 m/s)
