= Harlow Aircraft Company =

Former American aircraft manufacturer

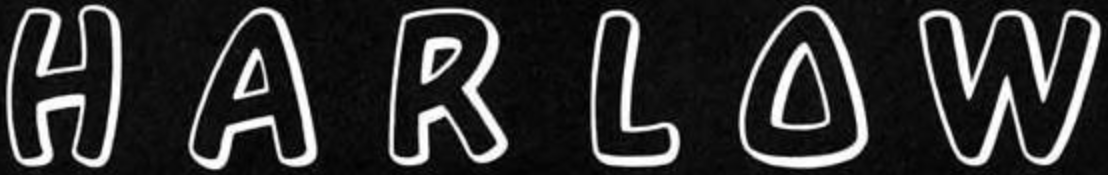
- Industry: Aerospace
- Founded: 1936
- Founders: Max B. Harlow
- Defunct: 1954
- Fate: Sold to Vultee Aircraft in 1941
- Successor: Vultee Aircraft

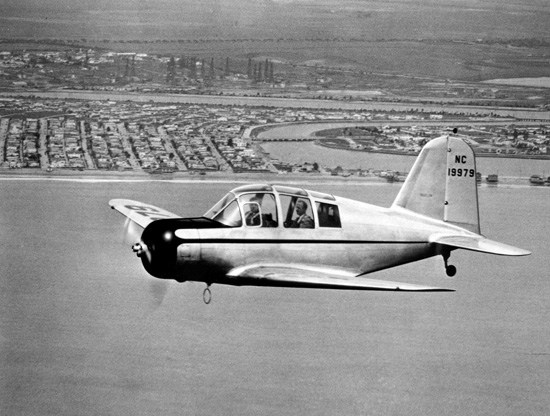
The prototype Harlow PC-5A trainer during flight testing

Harlow Aircraft Company was an American aircraft manufacturer at Alhambra Airport, Alhambra, California.

== History ==
The company was founded in 1936 by professor Max B. Harlow to build the Harlow PJC-2 a production version of the PJC-1. The aircraft had been designed and built as a class project at Pasadena Junior College. Harlow had worked with Howard Hughes on the Hughes H-1 racer. Hughes in turn later backed Harlow's enterprise. Flight operations were conducted at Alhambra Airport in the former Western Air Express hangar. The PJC-2 was followed by a military training version the Harlow PC-5. The PC-5 rights were purchased by Cub Aircraft Limited for wartime production. Harlow in turn bought one-third interest in Porterfield Aircraft Corporation. A majority interest in the company was bought by Intercontinent Corporation in 1941 who then sold the company to Vultee Aircraft. The company and facilities were subsequently used to build aircraft assemblies and components throughout the war.

In 1945 the company bought the manufacturing rights to the Interstate Cadet from Interstate Aircraft and Engineering Corporation, which had decided to focus on the production of appliances. Harlow also bought Alhambra Airport for $350,000 that year ($6.26 million in 2025), with the intention of building the Cadet there, but resold the aircraft rights to Call Aircraft Company in 1946 for $5,000 ($83,000 in 2025), and the airport to real-estate developers. The company halted operations later that year, although it continued to exist until at least 1954.

== Aircraft ==
Model name	First flight	Number built	Type
Harlow PJC-1	1937	1	Single engine cabin monoplane
Harlow PJC-2		11	Single engine cabin monoplane
Harlow PJC-4	N/A	0	Unfinished military trainer
Harlow PC-5	1939	33+	Military trainer
Harlow PC-6		1	Modified version of PC-5

== See also ==
- Atlas Aircraft
