= Spartan 12W Executive =

Cabin monoplane aircraft developed from Spartan Executive

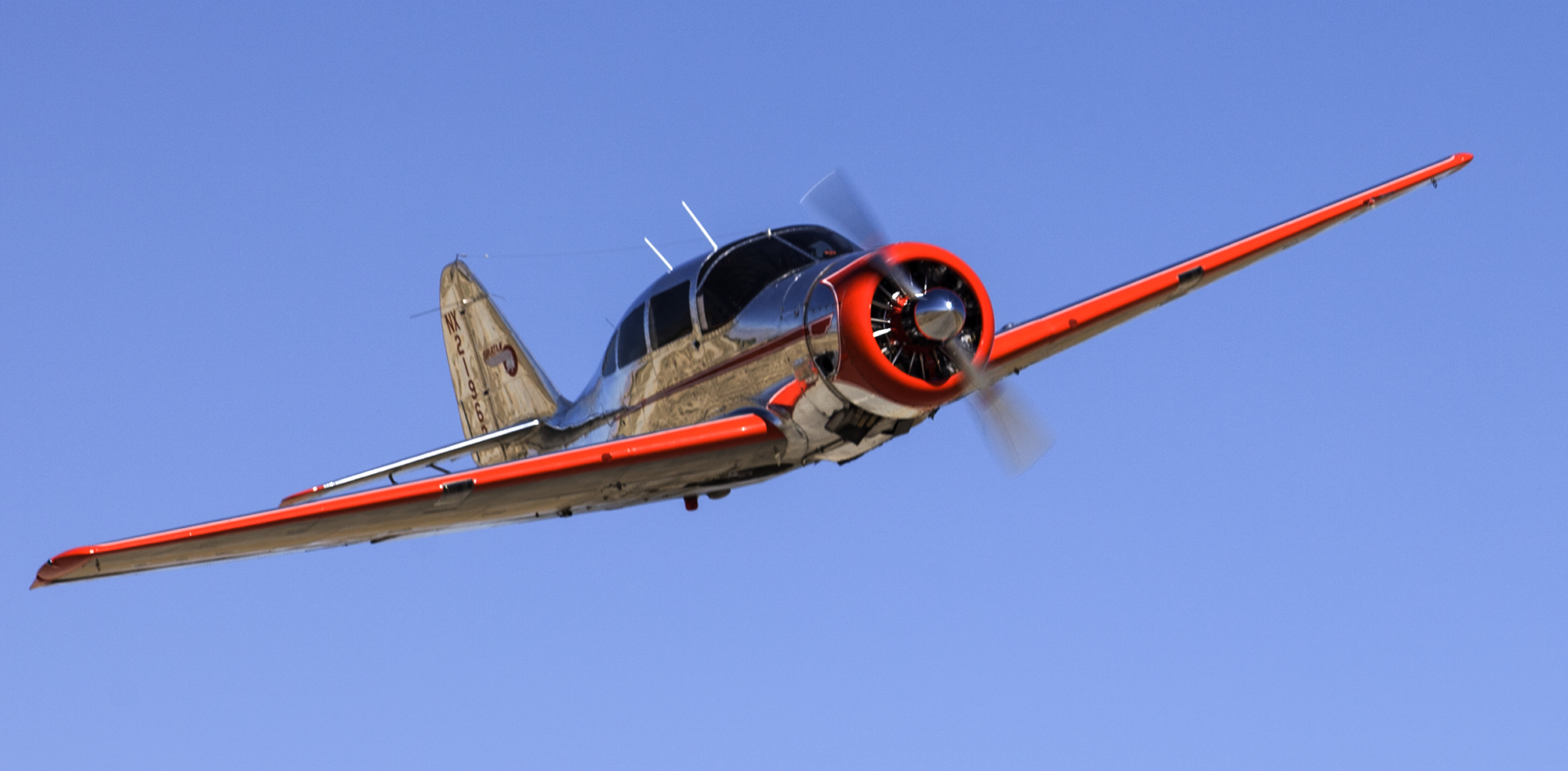
- Spartan 12W Executive

General information
- Type: Personal luxury transport
- National origin: United States
- Manufacturer: Spartan Aircraft Company
- Status: only one prototype completed
- Number built: 1

History
- Manufactured: circa 1946
- First flight: circa 1946
- Developed from: Spartan Executive

The Spartan 12W Executive was a tricycle gear post-war development of the Spartan 7W Executive, produced by the Spartan Aircraft Company. The 12W was intended to have higher performance and be more economical than the 7W.

== Design and development ==
After World War II, Spartan aircraft Company president J. Paul Getty was unsure of the market potential of a new executive aircraft. After building just one model 12W Executive (NX21962), the manufacturer lost interest in luxury aircraft and focused on constructing travel trailers instead. The sole example produced was owned by Spartan Aircraft and employed at their flight training school in Tulsa, Oklahoma.

The Spartan 12W Executive features magnesium alloy wings and tail surfaces and range extending wing tip-tanks. The magnesium alloy skin quickly corroded and was replaced with aluminum alloy. The tip-tanks were also removed.

== Aircraft on display ==
Spartan Aircraft flight training school eventually sold the Spartan 12W. Over the years, the aircraft passed through a number of private owners' hands. The 12W was restored in 1967 and in 2012 was retired. The 12W is now on static display at the Tulsa Air and Space Museum & Planetarium.

== Specifications ==
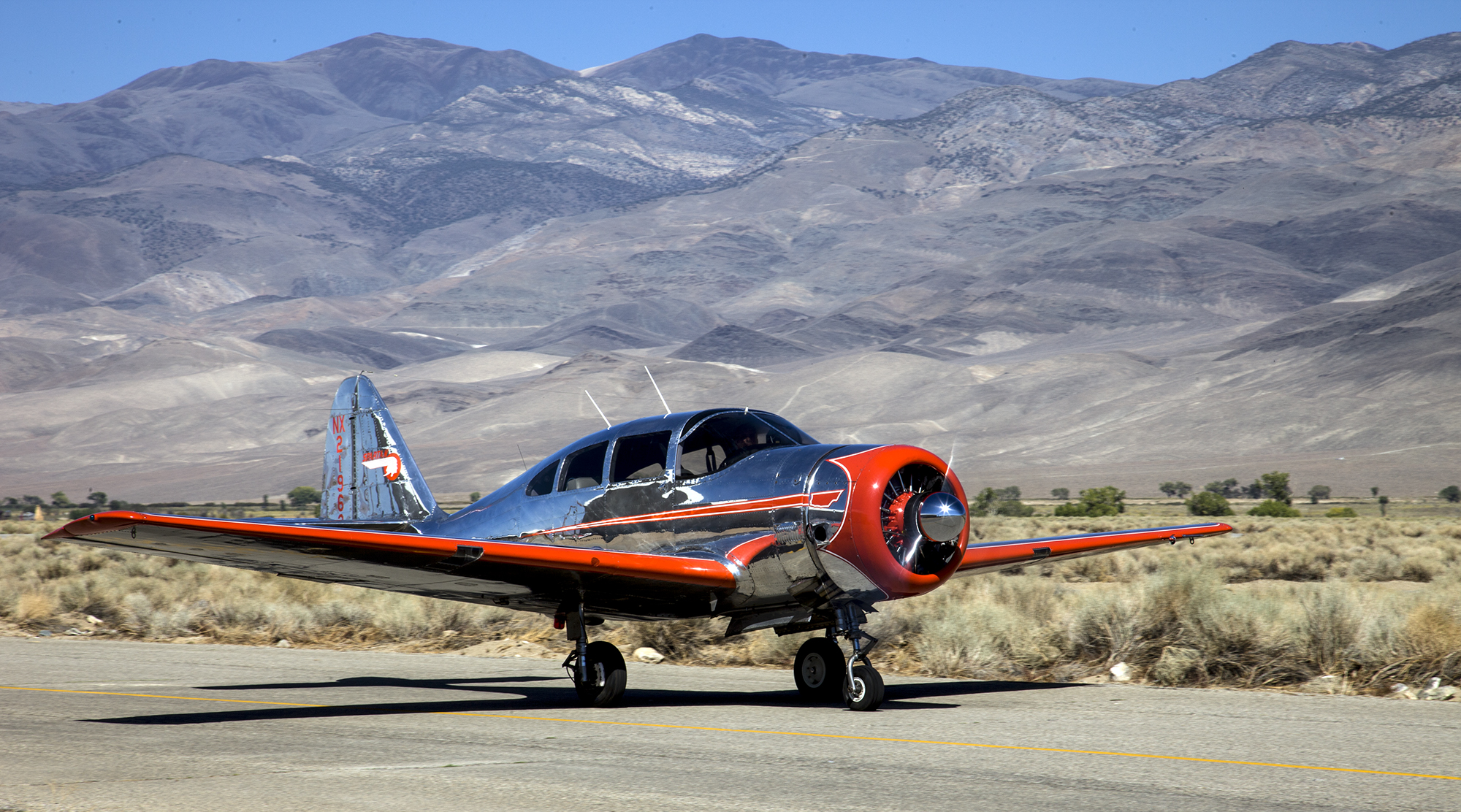
Spartan 12W Executive

Data from Aerofiles

General characteristics

- Crew: 1
- Capacity: 5 passengers
- Length: 27 ft 0 in (8.23 m)
- Wingspan: 39 ft 0 in (11.89 m)
- Powerplant: 1 × Pratt & Whitney Wasp Junior 9-cyl. air-cooled radial piston engine, 450 hp (340 kW)

Performance

- Maximum speed: 160 mph (260 km/h, 140 kn)
- Stall speed: 70 mph (110 km/h, 61 kn)
