= Spartan Aircraft Company =

American aircraft and travel trailer manufacturing company 1928-1961

- Company type: Incorporated
- Industry: Aerospace; Manufacturing
- Predecessor: Mid-Continent Aircraft Manufacturing Company
- Founded: 1928
- Founder: William G. Skelly
- Defunct: 1961
- Fate: Dissolved
- Headquarters: Tulsa, Oklahoma, United States
- Key people: J. Paul Getty (CEO); Brent Mills (CEO)

The Spartan Aircraft Company was an American aircraft manufacturing company, headquartered on Sheridan Avenue near the Tulsa Municipal Airport in Tulsa, Oklahoma. Previously known as Mid-Continent Aircraft Company, the company had been reorganized under the Spartan name in 1928 by oil baron William G. Skelly—and operated until 1961, manufacturing aircraft, aircraft components, and recreational vehicle trailers. The company was known for the luxurious Spartan Executive aircraft produced in the late 1930s and early 1940s.

J. Paul Getty acquired the company from Skelly in 1935. After World War II, Getty ended aircraft production and converted the company to manufacturing trailers under the Spartan Manor brand—subsequently ending all production in 1961.

== History ==
=== Early history ===
Successful oilman William G. Skelly purchased the struggling Mid-Continent Aircraft Manufacturing Company of Tulsa in January, 1928. He renamed the company Spartan Aircraft Company, reorganized it financially and began the Spartan School of Aeronautics. Skelly continued to support the venture during the early years of the Great Depression, while it began producing a line of airplanes. The economic depression strained Skelly's personal finances, and in 1935, J. Paul Getty purchased a controlling interest in the company from Skelly. At the beginning of World War II, Getty assumed direct control of the company operations. He expanded manufacturing by making sub-assemblies for warplanes and opened branches of the Spartan School of Aeronautics in Miami, Muskogee and Ponca City, Oklahoma.

=== Early aircraft ===
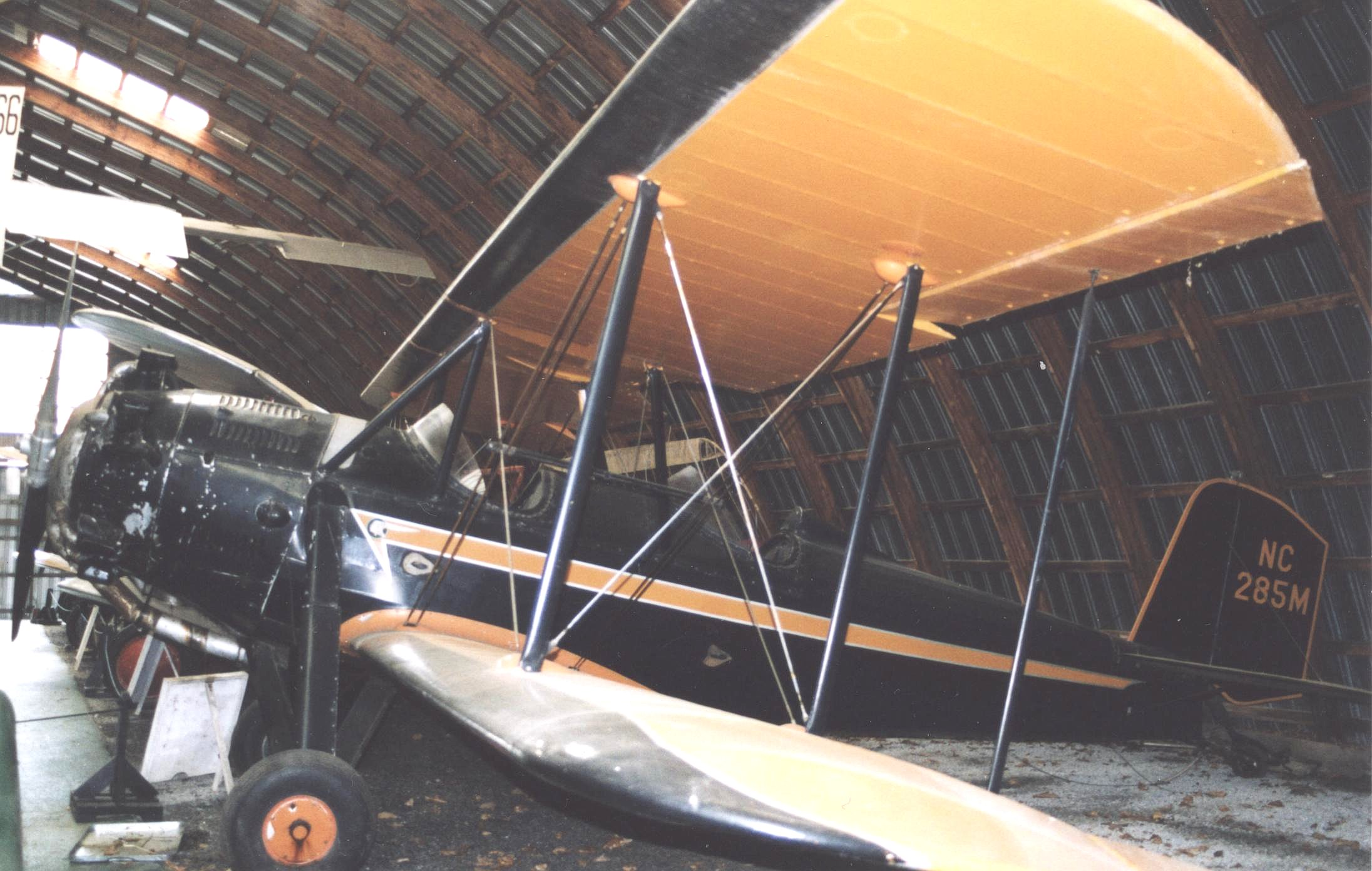
Spartan C3-165 of 1929 displayed airworthy at the Rhinebeck Aerodrome Museum near New York in June 2005

The first aircraft produced by the Spartan Aircraft Company was the Spartan C3 open-cockpit biplane. Built in 1926 (first flight 25 October 1926), the C3-1 was the first of a series of variants of the design for flight schools, sportsman aviators, and Fixed-Base Operators (FBO). The Spartan C3-225 was the last early biplane design produced by the company. At least 160 C-3 aircraft were built, using various engines.

1930 saw the production of Spartan's first monoplane design, the Spartan C2-60. Designed for the sportsman flier, the C2-60 was a lightweight design with a small 60 h.p. engine. Using many of C2-60's characteristics, Spartan produced the heavier, more powerful C2-165 low-wing monoplane. Unpopular with the military due to the view-obstructing low-wing design, the C2-165 was primarily used for civilian training purposes.

Improvements in Spartan's manufacturing and technology was evident in the 1930 Spartan C4. The C4 was a high-wing monoplane designed for low-maintenance and high-comfort. The Spartan C4 was designed to accommodate large engines of 230 h.p. and more.

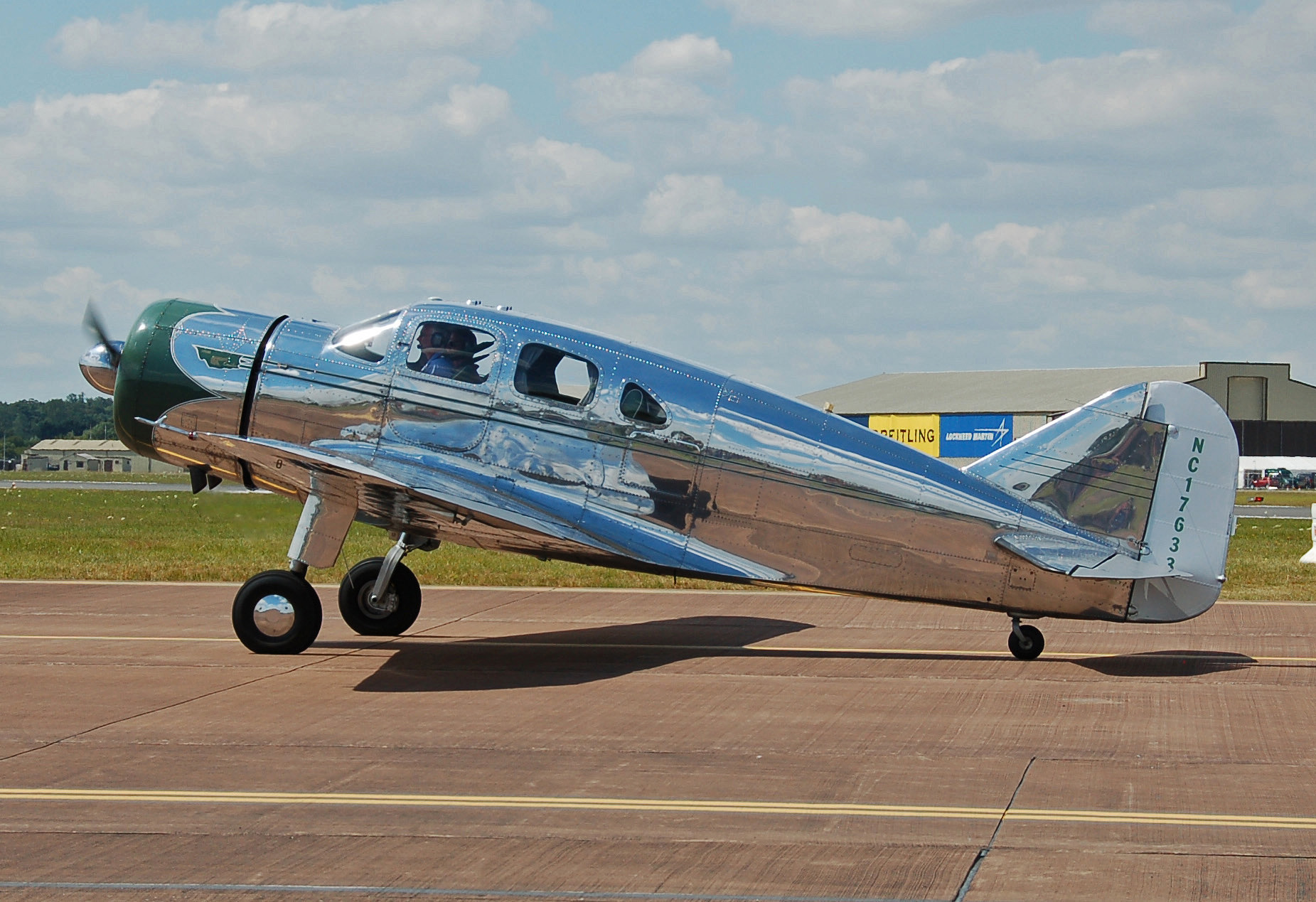
A Spartan Executive 7W arrives for the 2014 Royal International Air Tattoo, England

=== Spartan Executive 7W ===
The Spartan Executive Model 7W was a result of founder William Skelly's vision for an aircraft designed to accommodate the luxury and performance expected by wealthy people. Powered by a 450 h.p. Pratt & Whitney Wasp Jr. engine, the Executive was Spartan's first attempt at an all-metal aircraft design using monocoque technology. The large engine and aerodynamic airframe allowed for a then-remarkable 200-mile (320 km) an hour cruise speed, a range of over 1,000 nautical miles (2,000 km) and a 25,000 ft (7,600 m) service ceiling. Thirty four 7W aircraft were produced.

Based directly on the high-performance design of the civilian Spartan 7W, a version of the aircraft was developed to meet military needs for high-performance reconnaissance and training aircraft. The re-designed model was named the Spartan Zeus 8W and featured a powerful Pratt & Whitney Wasp 600 h.p. engine.

=== End of aircraft manufacturing ===
The last aircraft to be developed by the Spartan Aircraft Company was the Spartan NP-1 biplane. The NP-1 was a throwback to earlier aircraft in appearance, though the technology used in the aircraft's construction was certainly more advanced than the wire and fabric used in Spartan's early biplane designs. Built as a United States Navy trainer, the Spartan NP-1 featured a lightweight open-cockpit construction with a Lycoming R-680-B4C 225 h.p. engine.

=== Trailercoaches ===
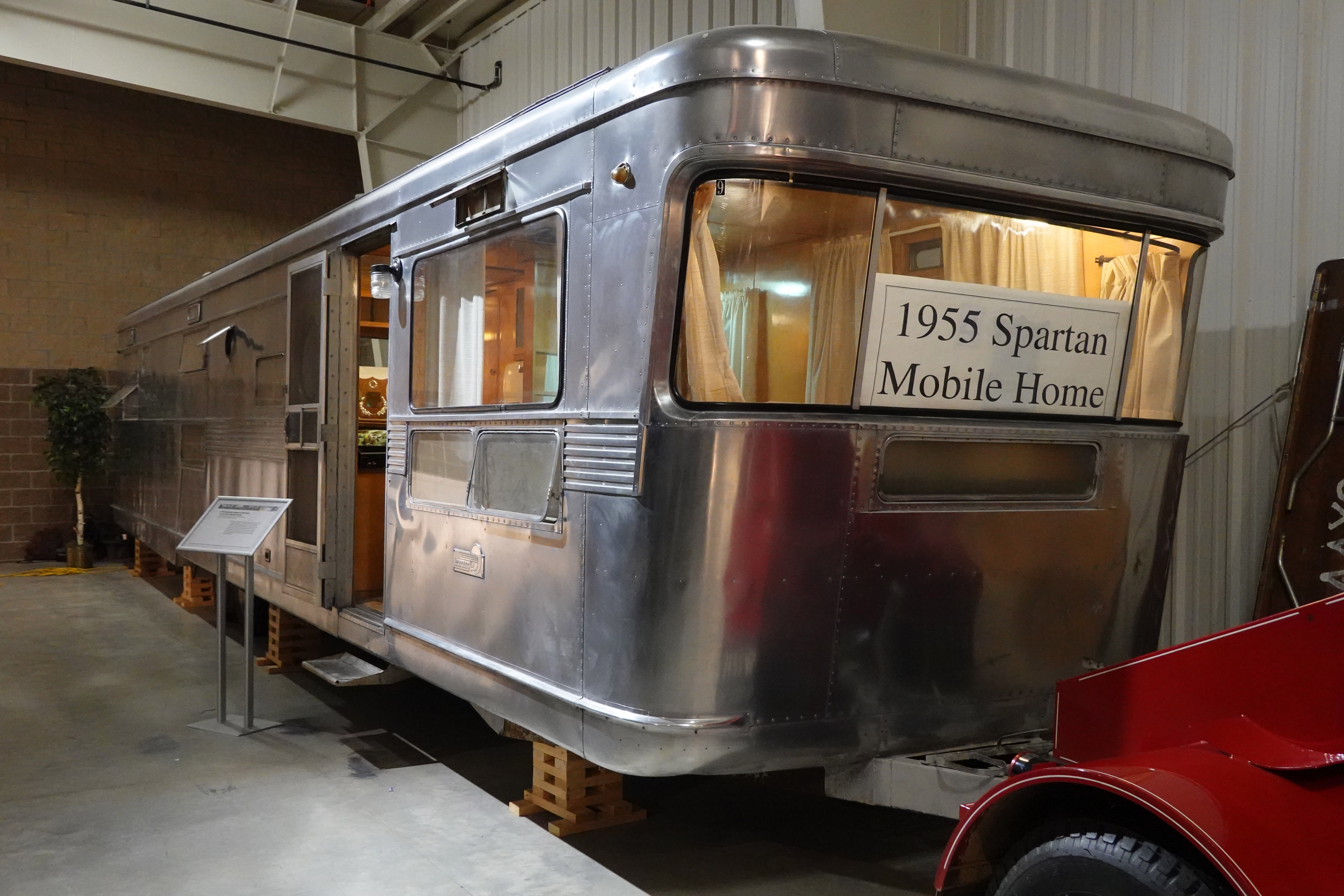
1955 Spartan Imperial Mansion trailer, displayed in the RV/MH Hall of Fame in Elkhart, Indiana.

After the ebb of personal aviation and the increased competition in the aircraft business following World War II, owner J. Paul Getty and Spartan upper-management redirected production to focus on the demand for housing and leisure. Using the same internally braced and space-saving monocoque design of the Spartan Executive 7W, the company produced its first all-metal travel trailer. The company followed previous design strategies, offering lavish and full-featured trailers. Through the 1940s and 1950s, Spartan produced what some referred to as the "Cadillac" of trailers, commanding prices higher than $4000. Spartan produced over 40,000 trailer homes before ending production in 1961. Given an average home cost in the United States at the time of $8000, Spartan trailers were a discretionary purchase for the wealthy.

=== Factories close ===
After 33 years of manufacturing aircraft and trailers, the Spartan Aircraft Company closed its manufacturing facilities and entered the insurance and financial business under the name Minnehoma Insurance Co. The Spartan name was sold to the Spartan School of Aeronautics, which operates today under the name Spartan College of Aeronautics and Technology. However, Pratt and Whitney R2000 aircraft engines continued to be overhauled under the nominated company the Spartan Aircraft Company as late as 1970 according to Department of Defense appropriations listings

== Aircraft ==
Model name	First flight	Number built	Type
Spartan C3	1926	~122	Single engine open cockpit biplane trainer
Spartan C4	1930	7	Single engine cabin monoplane utility aircraft
Spartan C5	1930	4	Single engine cabin monoplane utility aircraft
Spartan C2	1931	56+	Single engine open cockpit monoplane sport airplane
Spartan 7W Executive	1936	36	Single engine cabin monoplane utility aircraft
Spartan 8W Zeus	1937	4 or 5	Single engine cabin monoplane trainer
Spartan NP		201	Single engine open cockpit biplane trainer
Spartan 12W Executive		1	Single engine cabin monoplane utility aircraft
