= Alhambra Airport =

Former airport in Alhambra, California

Coordinates: 34.078°N 118.114°W

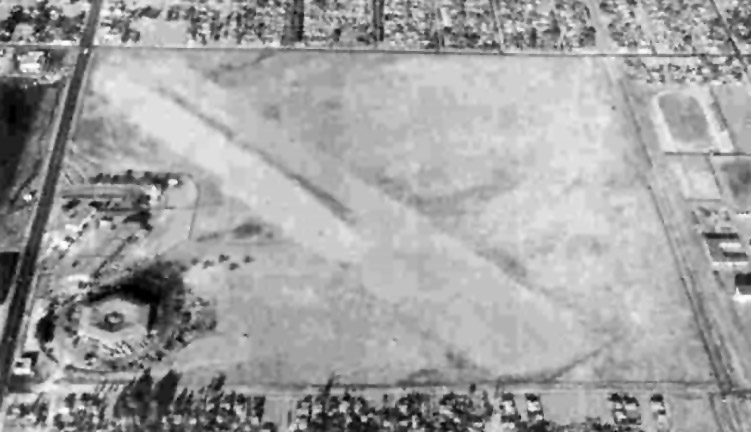
Alhambra Airport in 1943, US Army photo

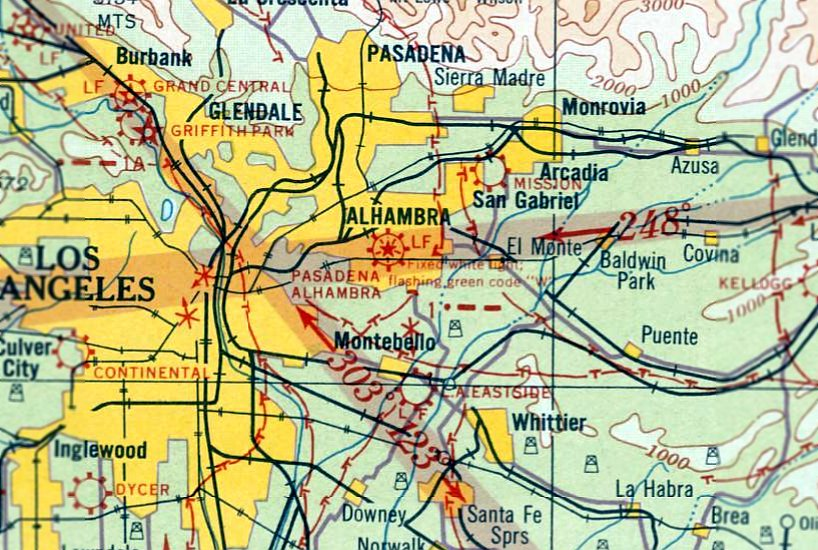
1932 Map with Alhambra Airport, labeled Pasadena-Alhambra Airport

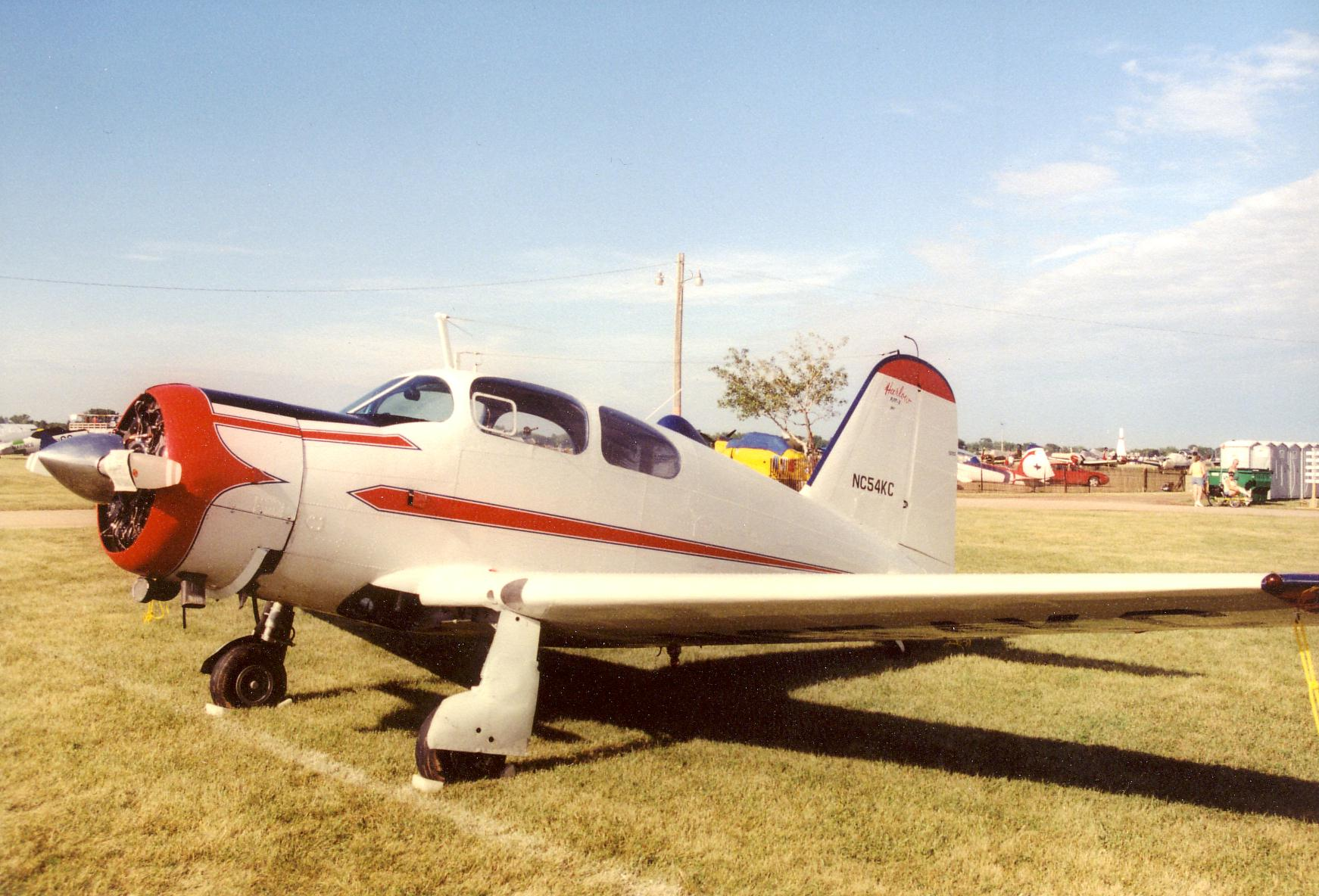
Harlow PJC-2 built at the Alhambra Airport in 1937

Alhambra Airport also called the Western Air College Airport was an airport in Alhambra, California from 1928 to 1946. The Airport was founded by the Western Air Express on 157-acre of land. The airport had a single 2,830-foot asphalt northeast–southwest runway. The Western Air Express built a unique hangar, that was a 44-foot hexagonal shape able to work on 6 aircraft at once. Western Air Express also build an air terminal building and a conventional hangar. Western Air Express at the opening operated Fokker F-32 from the airport. Western Air Express held a large dedication ceremony on April 17, 1930 for the new air terminal. The US Forest Service operated a patrol aircraft out of the airport to keep an eye out on the nearby San Gabriel Mountains. Just one year after the dedication ceremony, both Western Air Express and Transcontinental, which also had flights out of the airport, moved to the Burbank Airport and Glendale Grand Central Airport. With no scheduled flights, the Alhambra Airport became a private airport. A Western Air College flight school opened at the airport and some other small commercial operations. With Hollywood only 15 miles away, the Alhambra Airport became a popular spot to shoot movies. The 1936 movie 13 Hours by Air, directed by Mitchell Leisen and starring Fred MacMurray and Joan Bennett, was shot at the airport. In 1939 the film Danger Flight was shot at the airport, directed by Howard Bretherton, starring John Trent as Tailspin Tommy Tompkins, Marjorie Reynolds, Milburn Stone and Jason Robards Sr. The film featured young aviation enthusiasts in a model club. The four-seat cabin monoplane, Harlow PJC-2 designed by Max B. Harlow, was built at the Alhambra Airport in 1937. To support the build-up of the World War 2 effort, the Alhambra Airport was used as a depot for Lockheed Corporation military airplanes. Many P-38 Lightning fighters aircraft came, were packed and departed the depot on the Lend Lease Program. In 1941 the Flying Wild and They Met in Bombay were shot at the airport. In 1942 the movie Flight Lieutenant was shot at the airport. In 1943 the airport was sold to the city. Harlow Aircraft Company purchased the airport in 1945. Harlow Aircraft Company had been building small aircraft at the airport since 1936 in small qualities. In 1946 Harlow Aircraft Company sold the airport to real estate developers; the north part of the site is now commercial property and the remaining is houses. The Airport was located at what is now Valley Boulevard to the north, New Ave to the east, Almansor Street to the west and the Interstate 10 to the south. Western Air Express later became part of Western Airlines. Western Air College Airport also operated out of the Rosemead Airport for some years. Western Air Express operated out of the Vail Airport in Montebello before moving its operation to the Alhambra Airport.

== See also ==
- T. Claude Ryan
- Ryan Aeronautical
