= Harlow PC-5 =

American military trainer aircraft

PC-5
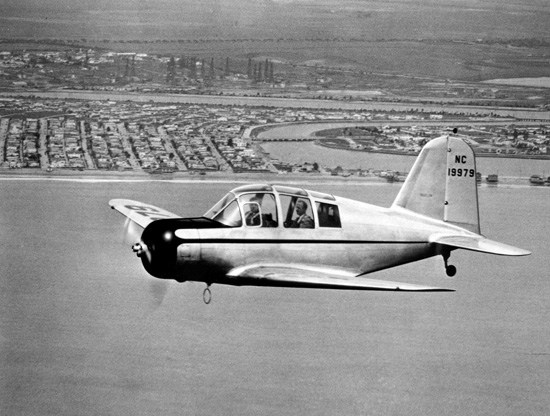
- PC-5A

General information
- Type: Military trainer
- National origin: United States
- Manufacturer: Harlow Aircraft Company; Hindustan Aeronautics Limited
- Designer: Max B. Harlow
- Primary user: Royal Indian Air Force
- Number built: 5 (PC-5); 28+ (PC-5A); 1 (PC-6)

History
- Introduction date: 1942
- First flight: 1939
- Developed from: Harlow PJC-2

The Harlow PC-5 was a 1930s American military trainer version of the PJC-2, and was designed and built by the Harlow Aircraft Company and license-produced by Hindustan Aeronautics Limited in India.

== Development ==
The Harlow Aircraft Company in Alhambra, California, designed a version of the PJC-2 as a tandem two-seat training aircraft. The PC-5 had a revised fuselage with dual controls. The aircraft first flew in July 1939 but it failed to interest the United States Army Air Corps. Howard Hughes' business partner, J.B. Alexander, backed the project and had flown in early examples of the aircraft. Harlow licensed the manufacturing rights to the PC-5 to Cub Aircraft of Canada during the wartime buildup. Only five aircraft had been built when the company was taken over by the Intercontinent Corporation. Components for 50 aircraft were supplied to the Indian company Hindustan Aeronautics, who were to assemble the aircraft for use by the Royal Indian Air Force as the PC-5A. The first PC-5A flew in August 1941, but it is not known how many were assembled and flown.

Using an engineering team brought in by Intercontinental, a cheaper version of the PC-5 was developed and built as the PC-6. The PC-6 wing failed, causing a fatal accident during an early test flight.

== Variants ==
PJC-5 later PC-5
Tandem two-seat training version of the PJC-2
PC-5A
Version for assembly in India by Hindustan Aircraft, number built not known.
PC-6
Cheaper version of the PC-5, one built.

== Operators ==
India

- Royal Indian Air Force

== Specifications (PC-5A) ==
Data from Jane's All the World's Aircraft 1941, The Illustrated Encyclopedia of Aircraft

General characteristics

- Crew: 2
- Length: 23 ft 7 in (7.19 m)
- Wingspan: 35 ft 7.5 in (10.859 m)
- Height: 7 ft 8 in (2.34 m)
- Wing area: 185 sq ft (17.2 m^{2})
- Airfoil: NACA 23012
- Empty weight: 2,015 lb (914 kg)
- Gross weight: 2,600 lb (1,179 kg)
- Powerplant: 1 × Warner Super Scarab 165-D 7-cylinder air-cooled radial piston engine, 165 hp (123 kW)
- Propellers: 2-bladed Hamilton Standard constant-speed propeller

Performance

- Maximum speed: 163 mph (262 km/h, 142 kn)
- Cruise speed: 145 mph (233 km/h, 126 kn)
- Landing speed: 56 mph (49 kn; 90 km/h)
- Range: 425 mi (684 km, 369 nmi)
- Service ceiling: 16,000 ft (4,900 m)
- Rate of climb: 700 ft/min (3.6 m/s)

== See also ==
Related development

- Harlow PJC-2

Aircraft of comparable role, configuration, and era

- Percival Proctor

Related lists

- List of historical aircraft of the Indian Air Force
