= Spartan 8W Zeus =

Military aircraft developed from Spartan Executive

8W Zeus
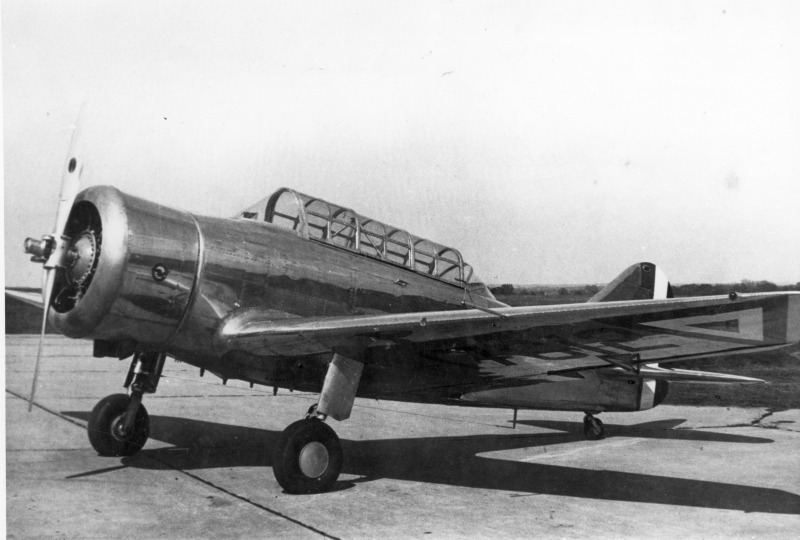

General information
- Type: Military training aircraft
- National origin: United States
- Manufacturer: Spartan Aircraft Company
- Number built: 1

History
- First flight: 1937
- Developed from: Spartan Executive

The Spartan 8W Zeus was a prototype military aircraft trainer built by Spartan Aircraft Company in the United States in 1937. It was based on the airframe of the Spartan Executive civil aircraft. The sole airframe produced was designated serial number 8W-1 and was registered as NX17612

== Design and development ==
The Spartan 8W Zeus was a conventional low-wing monoplane of metal construction, with a semi-monocoque fuselage and a cantilever wing. Designed as a two-place trainer, the 8W drew heavily from the design of the Spartan Executive. The wing, undercarriage, and lower half of the fuselage are essentially a modified 7W structure. The upper half of the fuselage was redesigned from a 4-5 place enclosed cabin into a tandem-seat, glazed cockpit with sliding canopies. The tail was also identical to that of the 7W. The main units of the tailwheel undercarriage were retractable.

The Spartan 8W Zeus was powered by a 600 hp (447 kW) Pratt & Whitney Wasp engine.

== Operational history ==
The intended purpose of the Zeus was to offer an advanced trainer for military use. After production of the prototype, the airplane was marketed, without success, to the United States Army Air Corps. As a follow-up to those marketing efforts, the prototype was flown to Glendale, California in 1939 for further evaluation by the military. Again, there were no orders generated by that evaluation and the Zeus returned to the factory in Tulsa, Oklahoma in 1940.

The final role of the prototype Zeus was as training tool for students at the Spartan School of Aeronautics.

== Variants ==
Spartan FBW-1

A concept model was introduced in an information brochure that portrayed a combat version of the 8W Zeus, with armament. The FB in the designation indicated Fighter-Bomber. No FBW-1's were ever produced.

== Specifications ==
Data from Aerofiles,

General characteristics

- Crew: Two
- Length: 27 ft 3 in (8.31 m)
- Wingspan: 39 ft 0 in (11.89 m)
- Powerplant: 1 × Pratt & Whitney R-1340 , 600 hp (410 kW)

Performance

- Maximum speed: 234 mph (374 km/h, 203 kn)
- Range: 760 mi (1,300 km, 660 nmi)
- Service ceiling: 29,400 ft (8,960 m)

Armament

- 1 × fixed, forward-firing machine gun in cowling
- 1 × flexible, rearward-firing machine gun in cabin
- 10 × 25 lb (13 kg) bombs carried under wings

== See also ==
Related lists

- List of aircraft of the Spanish Republican Air Force
- List of Interwar military aircraft
