= Spartan Executive =

American cabin monoplane aircraft produced 1936 - 1940

Spartan 7W Executive
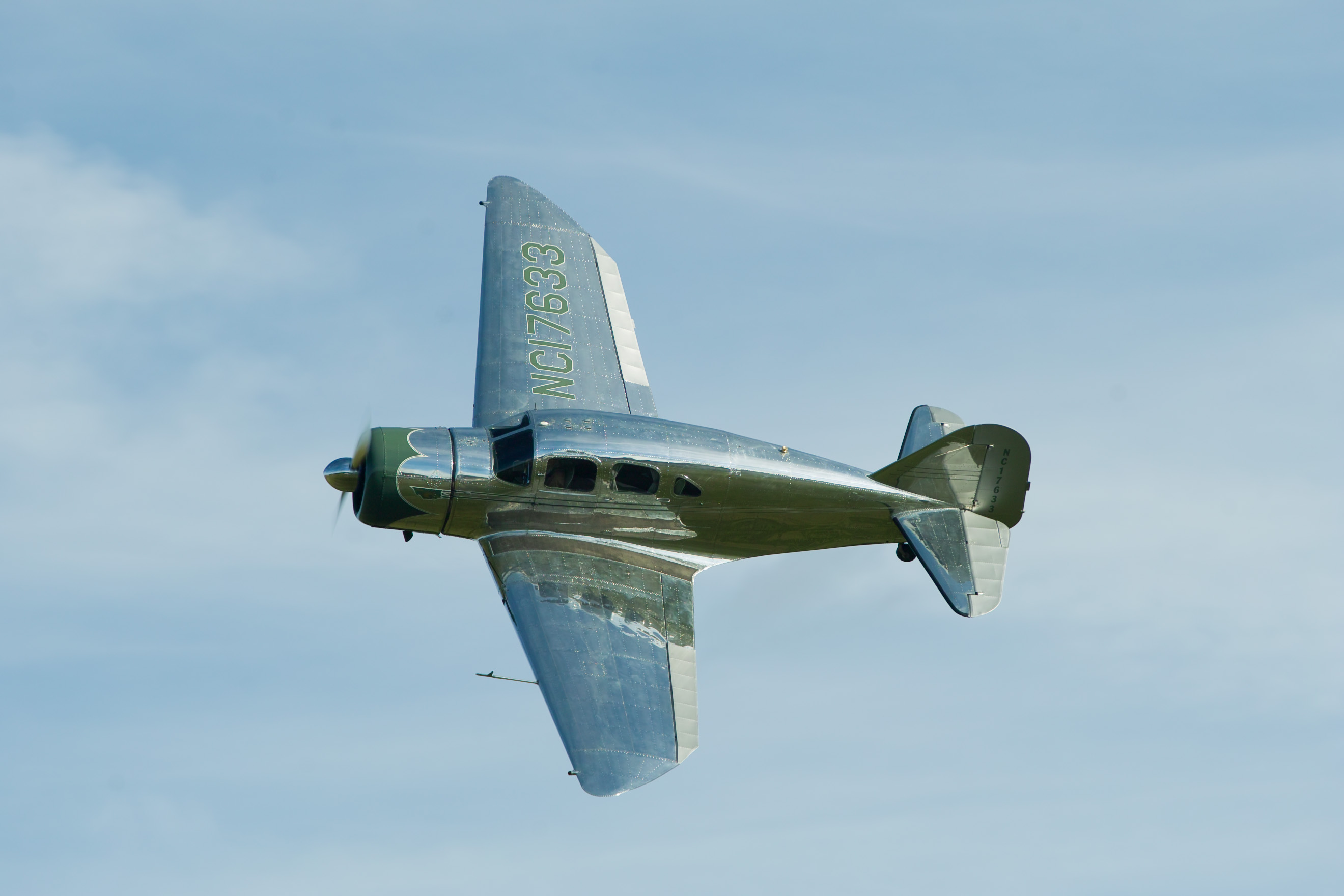
- Spartan Executive NC17633

General information
- Type: Personal luxury transport
- National origin: United States
- Manufacturer: Spartan Aircraft Company
- Number built: 36

History
- Manufactured: 1936 - 1940
- Introduction date: 1936
- First flight: March 8, 1936
- Variant: Spartan 12W

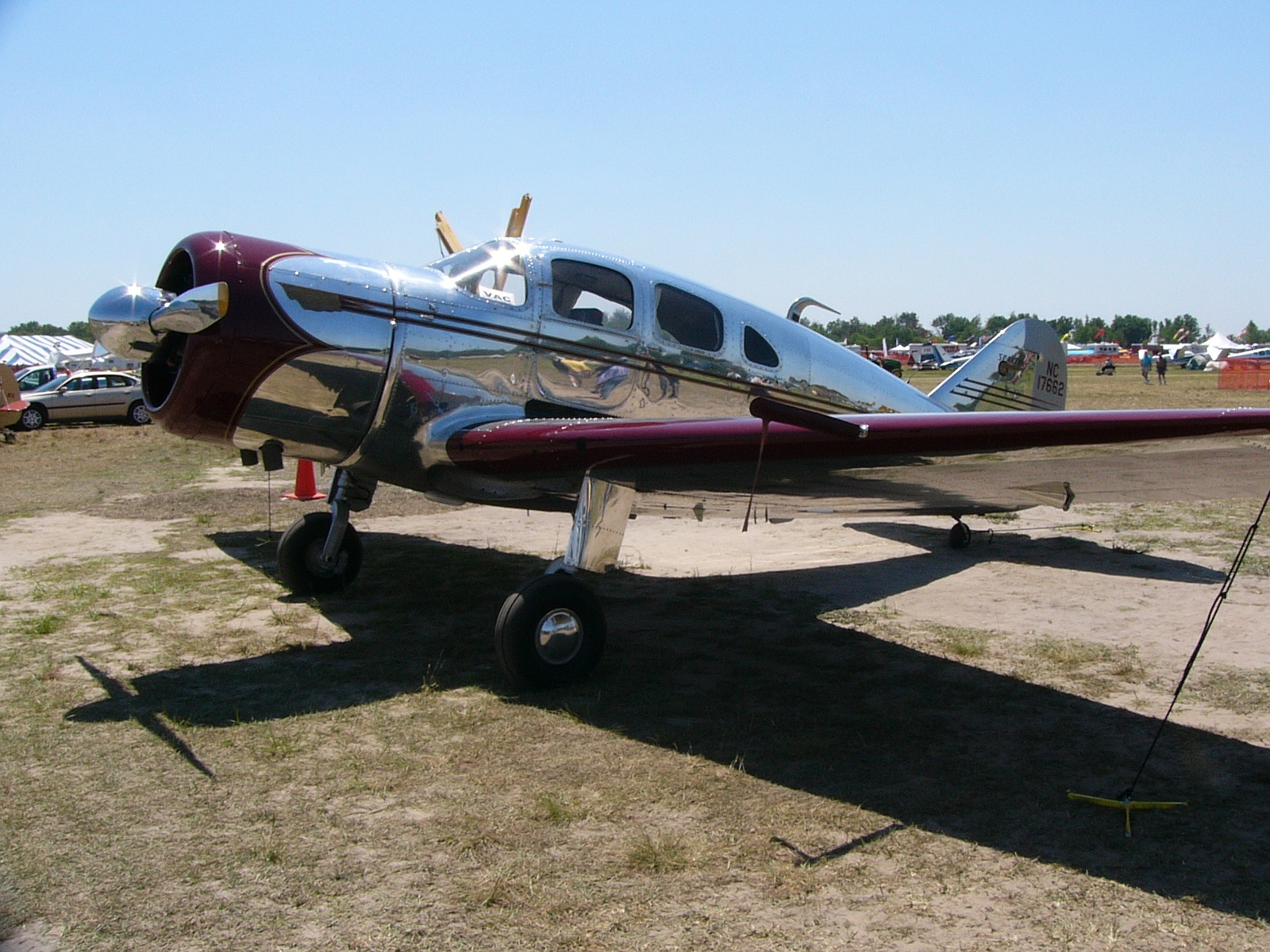
Spartan Executive at Sun 'n Fun 2006

The Spartan 7W Executive is a cabin monoplane aircraft that was produced by the Spartan Aircraft Company during the late 1930s and early 1940s. The 7W features an all-metal fuselage, as well as a retractable undercarriage. The 7W Executive was popular with affluent buyers worldwide.

== Design and development ==
Designed expressly for the executive market, the Spartan Executive was configured for both performance and comfort. Built during the Great Depression, the 7W was the brainchild of company-founder William G. Skelly of Skelly Oil who desired a fast, comfortable aircraft to support his tastes and those of his rich oil-executive colleagues. Through a series of acquisitions, J. Paul Getty took over ownership of the Spartan Aircraft Company in 1935, and directed its fortunes from that point to 1968.

The interior of the 7W is spacious and features 18 in (46 cm) of slide-back seat room for front-seat passengers, armrests, ash trays, dome lighting, deep cushions, cabin heaters, ventilators, soundproofing, large windows, and interior access to the 100 lb (45 kg) capacity luggage compartment. The interior can be configured for four or five passengers.

In 1938, Spartan published a concept brochure for a possible future military aircraft, the model 7W-F. Using existing photographs of Spartan Executive serial number 10 that was painted in a unique paint scheme and was registered as NC17610, artists modified those photographs to show the possibilities of the concept airplane. The photo enhancements incorporated two forward-firing .30 calibre machine guns mounted on the port side near the firewall and firing through the propeller arc through a synchronized mechanism. A further enhancement showed a gunner's station at a dorsal hatch on the roof with a windscreen and machine gun fitted. Bomb racks under the wings were also shown in the enhanced photos. The program never went beyond the concept brochure.

Following up on the 7W-F concept, Spartan then built a two-seat military variant of the 7W Executive, named the Spartan 8W Zeus. The aircraft featured a greenhouse canopy covering a tandem cockpit and was powered by a more powerful 600 hp (447 kW) Pratt & Whitney Wasp engine. The 8W was designed as an advanced trainer for military use. Only one example was built and Spartan was unsuccessful in marketing the airplane. It eventually became a training aid for the Spartan School of Aeronautics in Tulsa, Oklahoma.

Including the 7X prototype and the three-seat 7W-P photo reconnaissance model that evolved from the second prototype and was exported to China, 36 aircraft are generally referred to as Spartan Executives. Of the 36, only 34 are actual model 7Ws. The last 7W, serial number 34, was completed in September 1940.

In 1942, a total of 16 7W Executives were impressed into military service with the United States Army Air Forces. The 7Ws served as executive transports for military staff as the UC-71.

A post-World War II effort to rekindle interest in the Executive series, under the re-branded Spartan 12-W designation, failed to gain interest. Only one Model 12 was completed, and today is part of the Tulsa Air and Space Museum & Planetarium collection.

As of February 2022, a total of 20 model 7Ws still exist. Fifteen are based in the US, two are in England, one in Germany, one in France and one in Russia.

== Operational history ==
In April 2023 there were 19 Spartan 7Ws and one Spartan 12 remaining on the US Federal Aviation Administration aircraft register.

Notable owners of 7Ws include: American entrepreneur, aerospace engineer and founder of Garrett AiResearch, John Clifford Garrett; American aviator and air racer, Arlene Davis; American aviator, air racing pilot, and movie stunt pilot, Paul Mantz; wealthy industrialist J. Paul Getty, (Note: Getty was the president of Spartan Aircraft Company.); and King Ghazi of Iraq. King Ghazi's Spartan Executive was designated "Eagle of Iraq" and was outfitted with his coat of arms, an extra-luxurious interior and customized features. Although not an owner, aircraft designer and aviator Howard Hughes is often associated with the Spartan Executive due to his involvement with America's War Bond Campaign. During January 1943, Hughes was provided with one of the USAAF Spartans for his use in traveling from city to city promoting those bonds.

== Variants ==
Spartan 7X Executive
(Also known as Standard Seven) The first prototype, was fitted with a 265 hp (198 kW) Jacobs L-5 radial engine for the initial flight. All subsequent flights were made with a 285 hp (213 kW) Jacobs L-5 radial engine. The 7X initially had a very small tail. Only one was built and after the type certificate was received for the production model 7W, it became a training aid for the Spartan School of Aeronautics in Tulsa, Oklahoma.

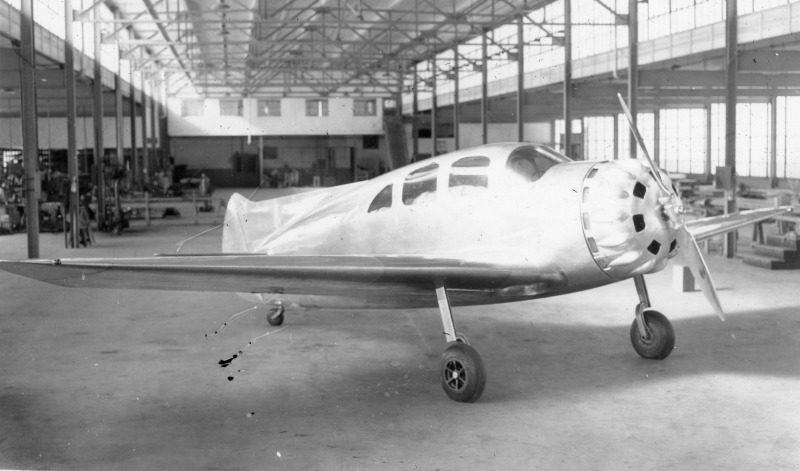
Initial design of the Spartan 7X Executive.

Spartan 7W-P Executive
Second prototype evolved into a three-seat photo reconnaissance model, similar in appearance to the thirty-four 7W production models. The 7W-P was produced in accordance with Type Certificate 646. The sole example, 7WP-1, was exported to China in 1937.
Spartan 7W Executive
Production version powered by a 450 hp (336 kW) Pratt & Whitney Wasp Junior SB radial engine. 34 built The type certificate associated with the production model 7W Executives is T/C 628.

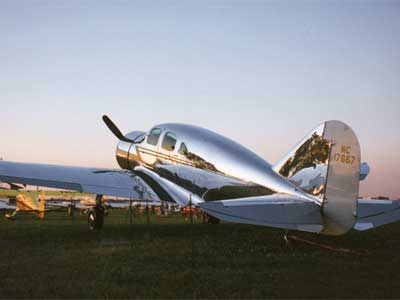
Spartan Executive 7W

Spartan 7W-F
A concept model that portrayed two-seat armed version with two fixed forward firing guns and one flexibly mounted machine gun in the rear cabin, as well as provision for 10 x 25 pound bombs on wing racks. The program never went beyond producing a concept brochure.
Spartan UC-71-SP
Spartan 7W Executives impressed by the US Army Air Corps.
Spartan 8W Zeus
Two-seat advanced trainer for military use.
Spartan FBW-1
A concept model that portrayed a combat version of the 8W, with armament. The FB indicated Fighter-Bomber. Like the Spartan 7W-F concept model, the program never went beyond producing a concept brochure.
Spartan 12W Executive
Postwar tricycle gear-equipped variant.

== Operators ==
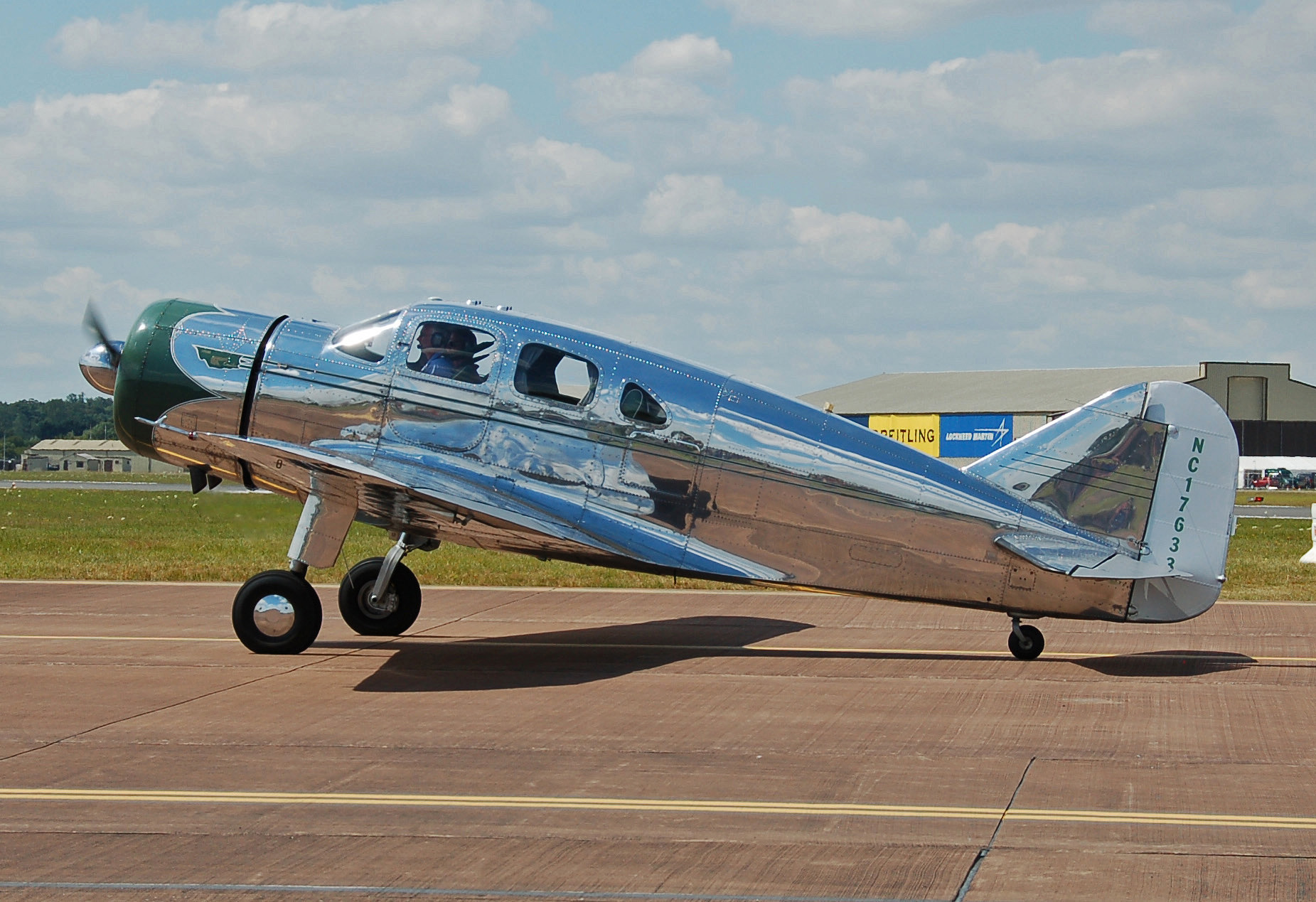
An Executive 7W arrives for the 2014 Royal International Air Tattoo, England

=== Military ===
China

- Chinese Nationalist Air Force

The only 7WP photo reconnaissance Spartan built was exported to China and it display identification number 1309. It was damaged beyond repair and captured by the Japanese who displayed it along with other captured Chinese aircraft.

Spanish Republic

- Spanish Republican Air Force/Aviación Nacional

At least one example was received by the LAPE (Líneas Aéreas Postales Españolas) to be used as an airliner marked as EC-AGM until requisitioned by the Spanish Republican Air Force and marked as 30+74. It was later captured by the Nationalists. Several others were purchased by the Republicans.

United Kingdom

- Royal Air Force

Four Spartan Executives were part of the Royal Air Force during World War II. One example (AX666) was built for King Ghazi of Iraq. The King died just prior to completion of the airplane, so the RAF acquired it. The airplane was used by No. 1 Photographic Reconnaissance Unit RAF but was destroyed in a landing accident in Montrose, Scotland in January, 1941. Three other examples were purchased by the United Kingdom Government in December 1940 and were used to provide refresher training to American pilots who would ultimately go on to serve in the RAF. When used for that purpose at Polaris Flight Academy in Glendale, CA, they continued to carry their U.S. civilian registration numbers of NC17604, NC17617 and NC17630. On January 1, 1943, these three Spartans officially became Royal Air Force aircraft and were given RAF serial numbers KD100, KD101 and KD102. The Spartans were assigned to the RAF Ferry Command in Dorval, Canada. Although based in Canada, they were never part of the Royal Canadian Air Force. They were returned to civilian ownership in the US after the War and all were reregistered with their original civilian registration numbers.

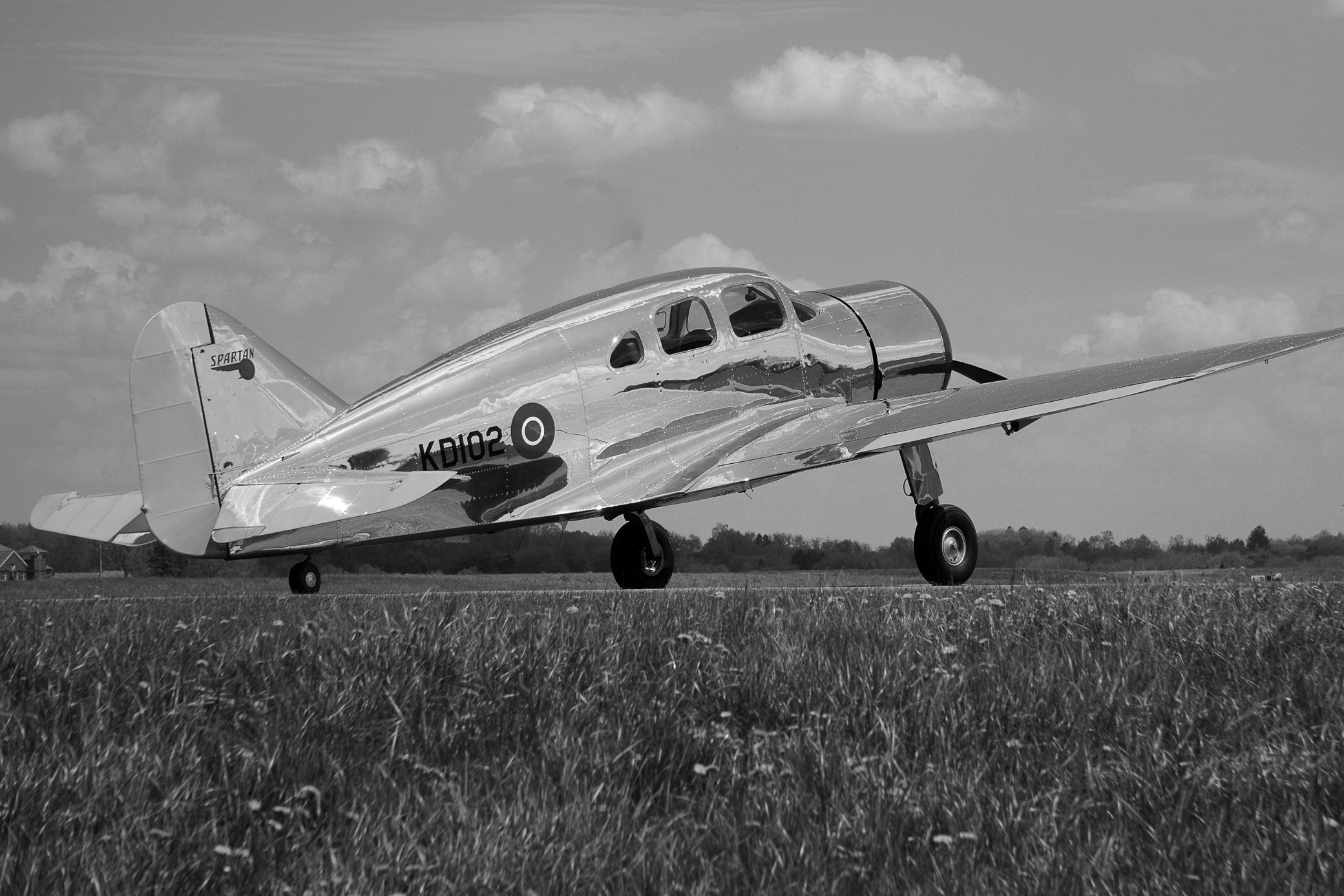
Contemporary photo of Spartan Executive S/N 17 as it would have looked while serving in the RAF at Dorval, Canada during WW II.

United States

- United States Army Air Corps/United States Army Air Forces

16 examples impressed from civil owners. All but two survived to return to civil service.

== Specifications (Spartan 7W Executive) ==
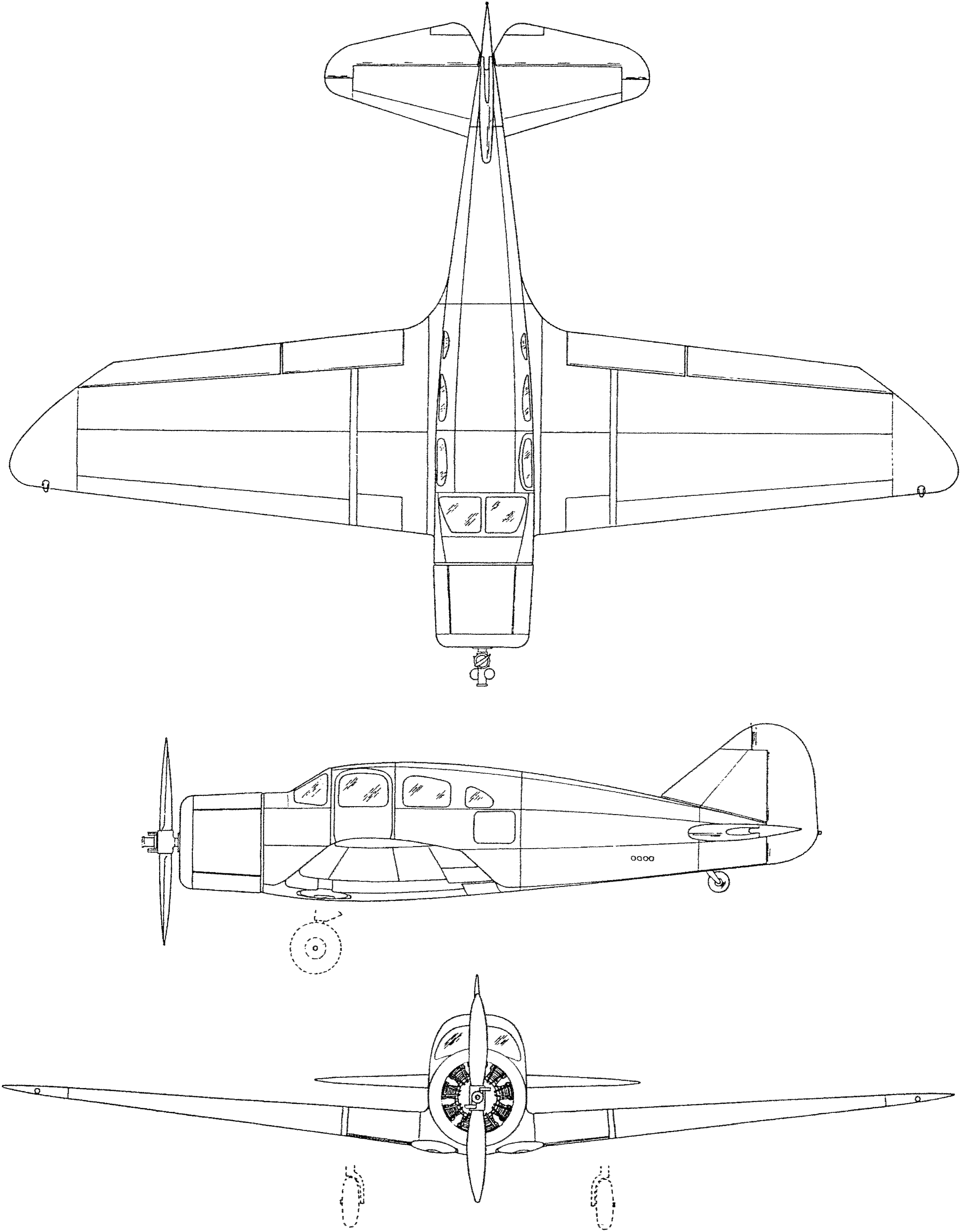
3-view line drawing of the Spartan 7W Executive

Data from EAA Spartan

General characteristics

- Crew: 1
- Capacity: 3 or 4 passengers
- Length: 26 ft 10 in (8.18 m)
- Wingspan: 39 ft 0 in (11.89 m)
- Height: 8 ft 0 in (2.44 m)
- Wing area: 250 sq ft (23 m^{2})
- Empty weight: 3,400 lb (1,542 kg)
- Max takeoff weight: 4,400 lb (1,996 kg)
- Powerplant: 1 × Pratt & Whitney R-985 9-cylinder air-cooled radial piston engine, 450 hp (340 kW)
- Propellers: 2-bladed variable-pitch propeller

Performance

- Maximum speed: 257 mph (414 km/h, 223 kn)
- Cruise speed: 215 mph (346 km/h, 187 kn)
- Range: 1,000 mi (1,600 km, 870 nmi)
- Service ceiling: 24,000 ft (7,300 m)
- Rate of climb: 1,080 ft/min (5.5 m/s)

== See also ==
Related development

- Spartan 8W Zeus
- Spartan 12W Executive

Aircraft of comparable role, configuration, and era

- Airspeed Courier
- Beechcraft 17
- Clark 46 Duramold a.k.a. Fairchild Model 46
- Fairchild Model 45
- Harlow PJC-2
- Howard DGA-11, DGA-15
- Junkers Ju 60
- Lockheed Model 9 Orion
- Northrop Delta

Related lists

- List of civil aircraft
- List of aircraft of World War II
- List of military aircraft of the United States
- List of aircraft of Canada's air forces
