= List of historical aircraft of the Indian Air Force =

The Indian Air Force is one of the three constituents of the Indian Armed Forces. It was established in 1932.

The Air Force operates a combination of combat, reconnaissance, transport aircraft, and helicopters. The early fleet consisted majorly of imported planes while HAL designed and built some aircraft locally. HAL was involved in license production of some of the foreign aircraft in India.

== Aircraft ==
Name	Origin	Primary role(s)	Introduced	Retired	Count	Notes
Introduced into service before 1947
Westland Wapiti	United Kingdom	Liaison	1933	1942	28	
Armstrong Whitworth Atalanta	United Kingdom	Transport	1941	1944	5	
Avro Anson I	United Kingdom	Basic trainer	1942	1945	7	
Boulton Paul Defiant TT.III	United Kingdom	Target tug	1944	1945	?	
Bristol Blenheim I	United Kingdom	Bomber	1941	1942	5	
de Havilland D.H.86B	United Kingdom	Transport	1940	1942	2	
de Havilland Dragon Rapide	United Kingdom	Transport	1941	1945	4	
de Havilland Tiger Moth	United Kingdom	Basic trainer	1939	1957	192	
Douglas Dakota	United States	Transport	1944	1987	206	
Fairchild PT-19	United States	Basic trainer	1943	1946	40	
Harlow PC-5A	United States	Transport	1941	1942	4	
Hawker Audax	United Kingdom	Liaison	1939	1945	7	
Hawker Hart	United Kingdom	Bomber	1939	1942	7	
Hawker Hind	United Kingdom	Bomber	1939	1941	6	
Hawker Hurricane	United Kingdom	Fighter-bomber	1942	1945	?	
North American Harvard Mk.II and 4	Canada	Basic trainer	1942	1973	?	
Supermarine Spitfire Vc & VIIIc	United Kingdom	Fighter/Reconnaissance	1943	1948	19	
Vickers Valentia	United Kingdom	Transport	1942	1944	1	
Vultee Vengeance	United States	Bomber	1942	1945	35	
Westland Lysander II	United Kingdom	Liaison	1941	1943	25	
Westland Lysander III.T	United Kingdom	Target tug	1941	1942	48	
Airspeed Oxford	United Kingdom	Transport	1946	1949	5	
Auster AOP.6	United Kingdom	Liaison	1946	1970	20	
Hawker Tempest II	United Kingdom	Fighter	1945	1955	235	
Supermarine Spitfire FR.XIVE & FR.XVIII	United Kingdom	Fighter/Reconnaissance	1945	1957	120	
Introduced into service between 1947 and 1970
Aero Ae-45	Czechoslovakia	Transport	1955	1957	1	
Antonov An-12	Soviet Union	Transport	1961	1993	65	
Auster AOP.9	United Kingdom	Liaison	1955	1981	35	
Bell 47G-2	United States	Helicopter	1957	1979	15	
Consolidated B-24J Liberator	United States	Bomber	1948	1967	45	(Note: Ex-RAF World War Two lend-lease bombers refurbished by HAL)
Dassault MD. 450B Ouragan	France	Fighter-bomber	1953	1967	104	(Note: Target tug from 1965, retired in 1967)
Dassault Mystère MD.454 IVA	France	Fighter-bomber	1957	1973	104	
de Havilland Canada DHC-3 Otter	Canada	Transport	1956	1998	36	
de Havilland Canada DHC-4 Caribou	Canada	Transport	1963	1991	26	
de Havilland Devon	United Kingdom	Transport	1947	1991	22	
de Havilland Vampire F.3	United Kingdom	Fighter	1948	1955	3	
de Havilland Vampire FB.52	United Kingdom	Fighter-bomber	1950	1974	286	(Note: 247 built under licence by HAL)
de Havilland Vampire NF.10	United Kingdom	Fighter	1953	1955	30	
de Havilland Vampire NF.54	United Kingdom	Fighter	1953	1966	30	
de Havilland Vampire PR.55	United Kingdom	Reconnaissance	1954	1965	5	(Note: PR.55 were T.55s converted to photo reconnaissance)
de Havilland Vampire T.11	United Kingdom	Basic trainer	1963	?	7	
de Havilland Vampire T.55	United Kingdom	Basic trainer	1953	1982	124	(Note: 60 T.55s built under licence by HAL)
English Electric Canberra B(I).58/B(I).66/PR.57/PR.67/T.4/T.13	United Kingdom	Bomber/Reconnaissance	1957	2007	150	
Fairchild C-119G Flying Boxcar	United States	Transport	1953	1984	89	
Folland Fo.141 Gnat F.1	United Kingdom	Fighter	1958	1978	?	(Note: Licence built by HAL)
HAL HF-24 Marut Mk.1	India	Fighter-bomber	1961	1985	147	
HAL HT-2	India	Basic trainer	1953	1998	169	
Hawker Hunter FGA.56A	United Kingdom	Fighter-bomber	1957	1996	167	
Hawker Hunter T.66	United Kingdom	Basic trainer	1959	1992	40	
Ilyushin Il-14	Soviet Union	Transport	1955	1981	29	
Lockheed Super Constellation	United States	Transport	1961	1981	9	
Mikoyan-Gurevich MiG-21F-13/FL/PFM/M/bis/Bison	Soviet Union	Fighter	1964	2025	872	
Mil Mi-4	Soviet Union	Helicopter	1960	1988	121	
North American T-6G Texan	United States	Basic trainer	1973	?		
Percival Prentice T.3	United Kingdom	Basic trainer	1947	1963	62	(Note: Includes 42 built by HAL)
Sikorsky S-55	United States	Helicopter	1954	1966	8	(Note: Might have been used till 1968)
Sikorsky S-62B	United States	Helicopter	1960	1979	2	
Supermarine Spitfire PR.XI & XIX	United Kingdom	Reconnaissance	1947	1959	15	
Supermarine Spitfire T.IX	United Kingdom	Basic trainer	1947	1955	10	
Vickers Viscount	United Kingdom	Transport	1955	1971	2	
HAL Krishak	India	Liaison	1965	1988	68	
HAL Pushpak	India	Basic trainer	1965	1967	25	
Hawker Hunter F. Mk.56	United Kingdom	Fighter	1966	1992	55	
Sukhoi Su-7BMK/BKL	Soviet Union	Fighter-bomber	1968	1986	140	
Tupolev Tu-124	Soviet Union	Transport	1966	1981	3	
Introduced into service after 1971
HAL Ajeet Mk.1	India	Fighter	1977	1991	89	(Note: Improved Folland Gnat, includes 10 upgraded Gnats)
HAL HPT-32 Deepak	India	Primary trainer	1984	2009	144	
Mikoyan-Gurevich MiG-23UB	Soviet Union	Conversion trainer	1980	2019	15	
Mikoyan-Gurevich MiG-23BN	Soviet Union	Fighter-bomber	1981	2009	95	
Mikoyan-Gurevich MiG-23MF	Soviet Union	Fighter	1982	2007	40	
Mikoyan-Gurevich MiG-25RBK/RU	Soviet Union	Reconnaissance	1981	2006	10	(Note: 6 MiG-25RBK and 2 MiG-25RU)
Mikoyan-Gurevich MiG-27ML	Soviet Union	Fighter	1985	2019	165	
PZL TS-11 Iskra bis-D	Poland	Basic trainer	1975	2004	76	(Note: 26 aircraft bought in the 1990s)
SEPECAT Jaguar IS GR.1	United Kingdom/France	Ground attack	1979	1984	16	(Note: Other variants still operational)
Sukhoi Su-30K	Russia	Multirole	1996	2007	18	(Note: Initial production batch, replaced with equivalent numer of Su-30MKI's. 12 sold to Angola in 2016 and 2019, Six sold to Ethiopia in 2024 following refurbishment in Belarus.)

== Gallery ==
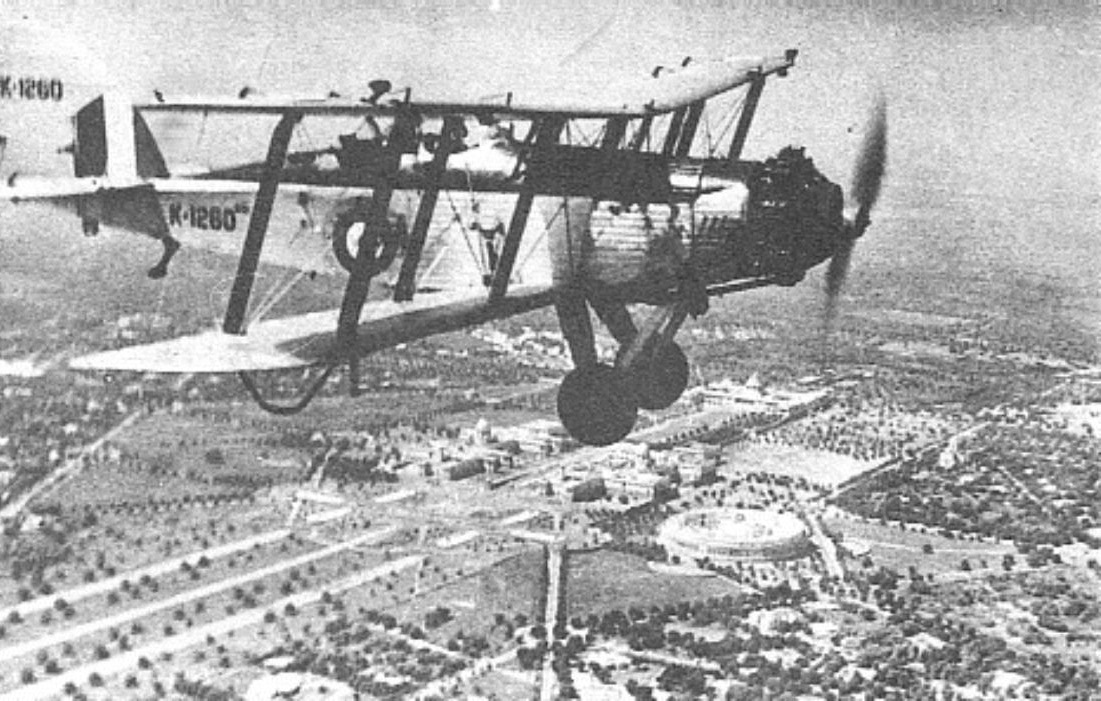
Westland Wapiti, the first aircraft flown by the Royal Indian Air Force

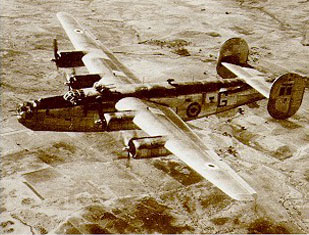
Consolidated B-24 Liberator heavy bomber in the early 1950s

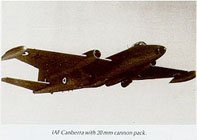
English Electric Canberra medium bomber introduced in the 1950s

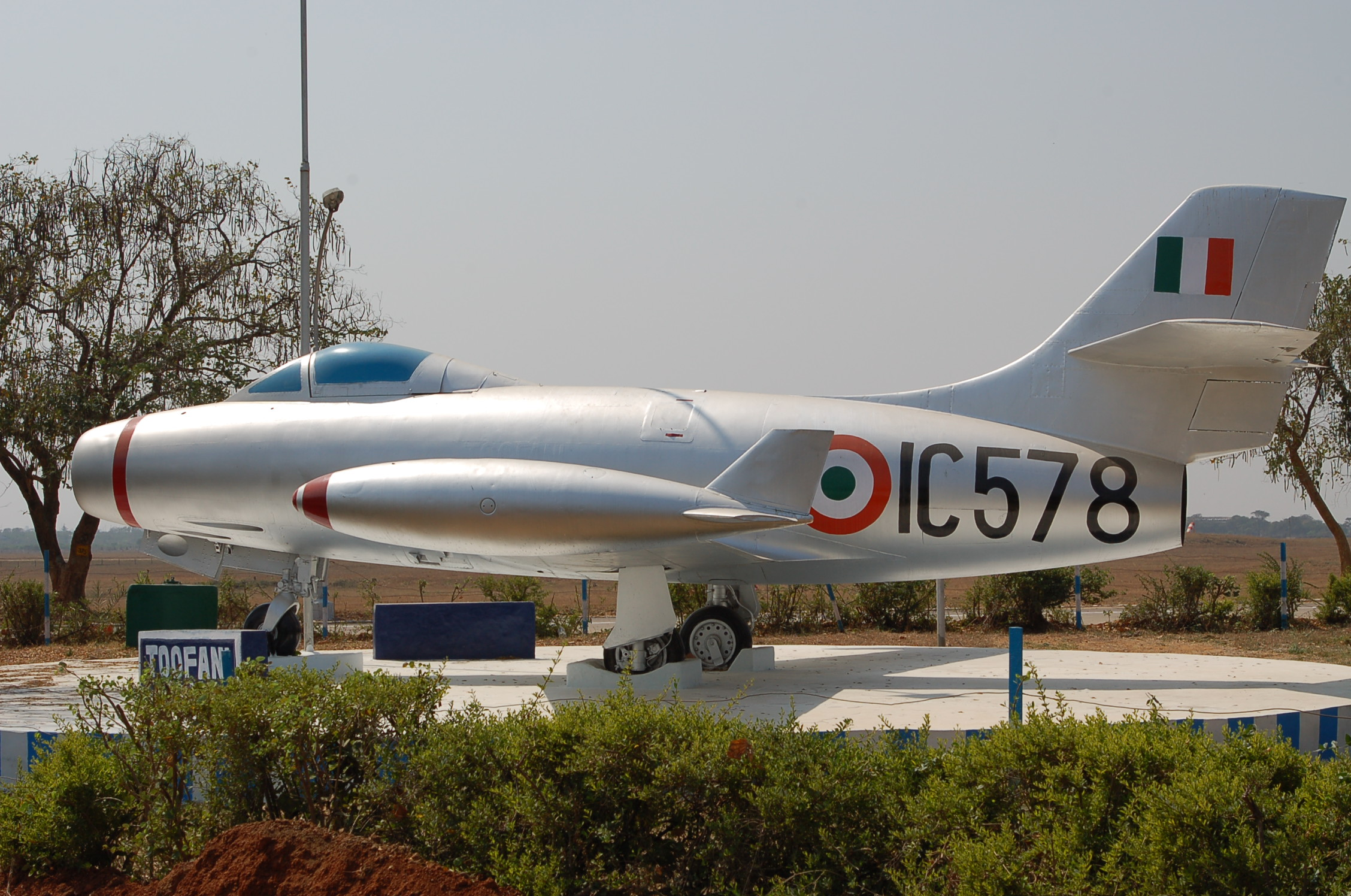
Dassault Ouragan fighter-bomber introduced in 1953

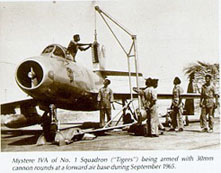
Dassault Mystere IV being armed in September 1965

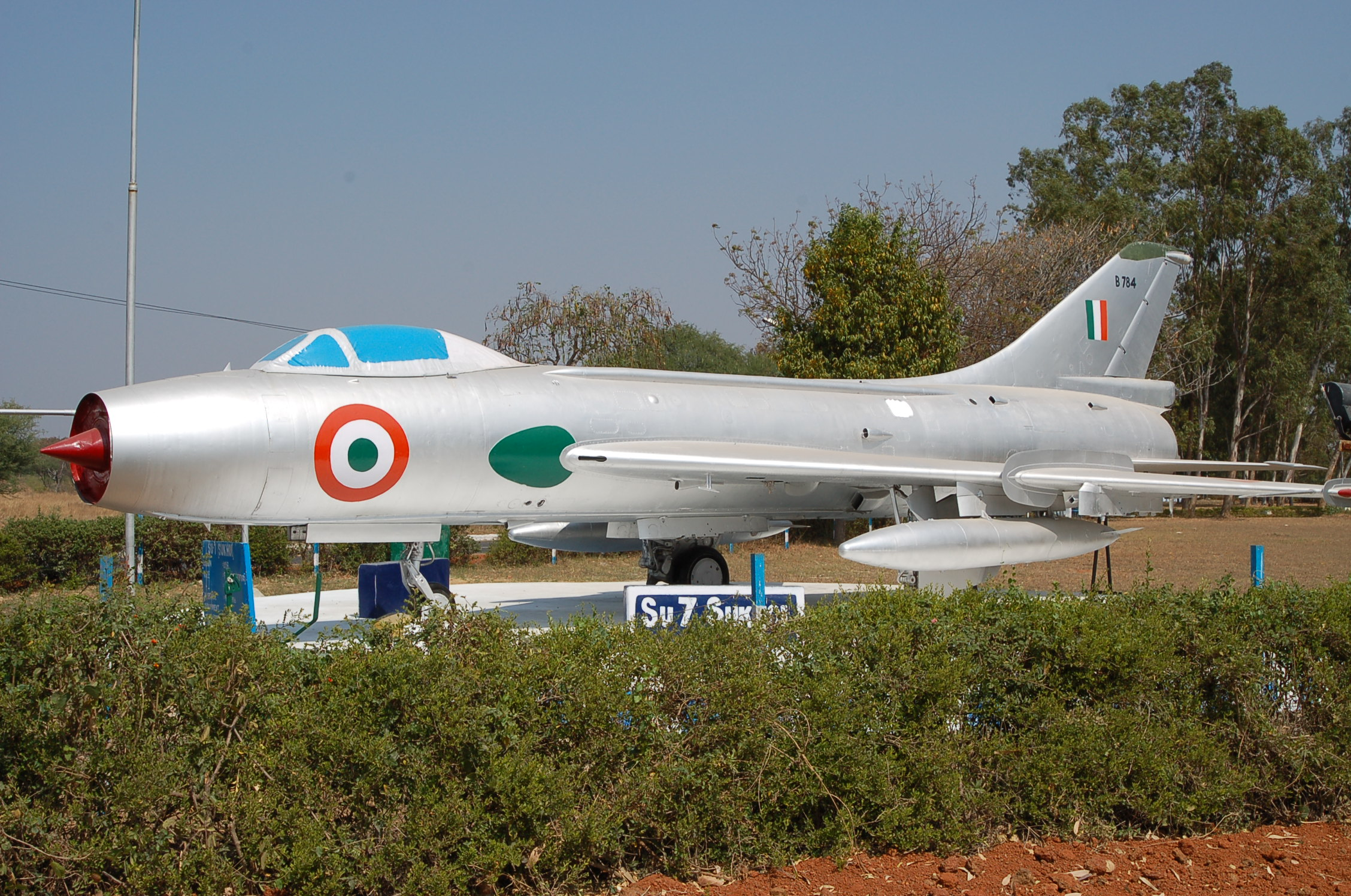
Sukhoi Su-7 fighter-bomber from the 1970s

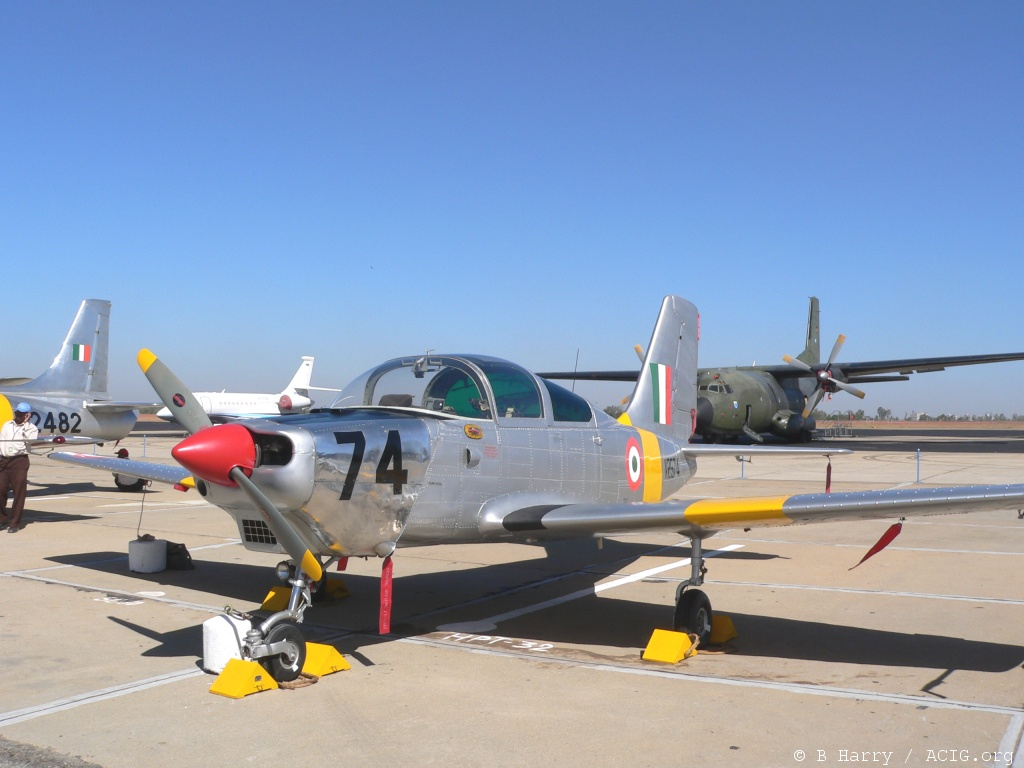
HAL HPT-32 Deepak trainer aircraft

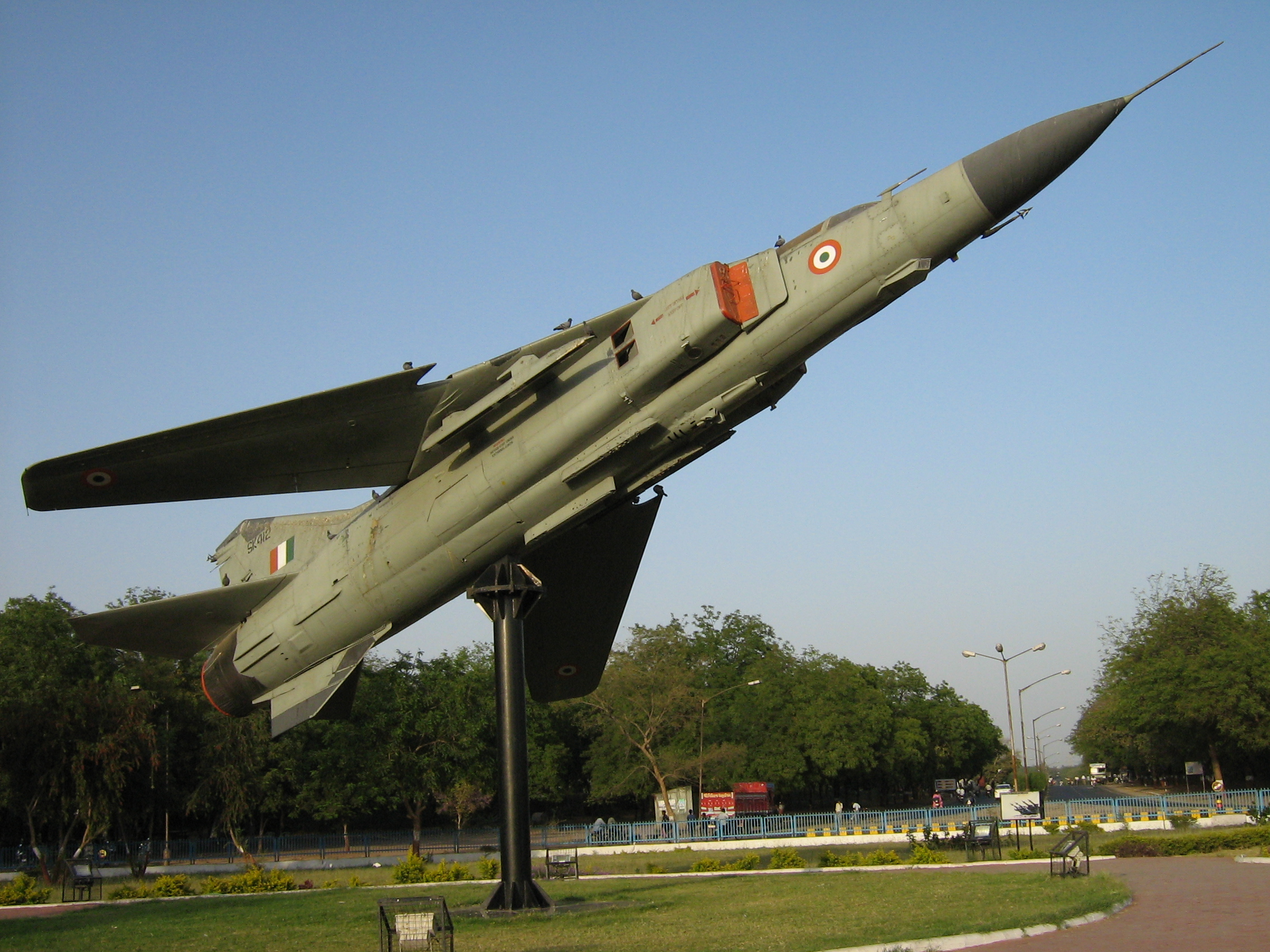
MiG-23 fighter aircraft introduced in 1981

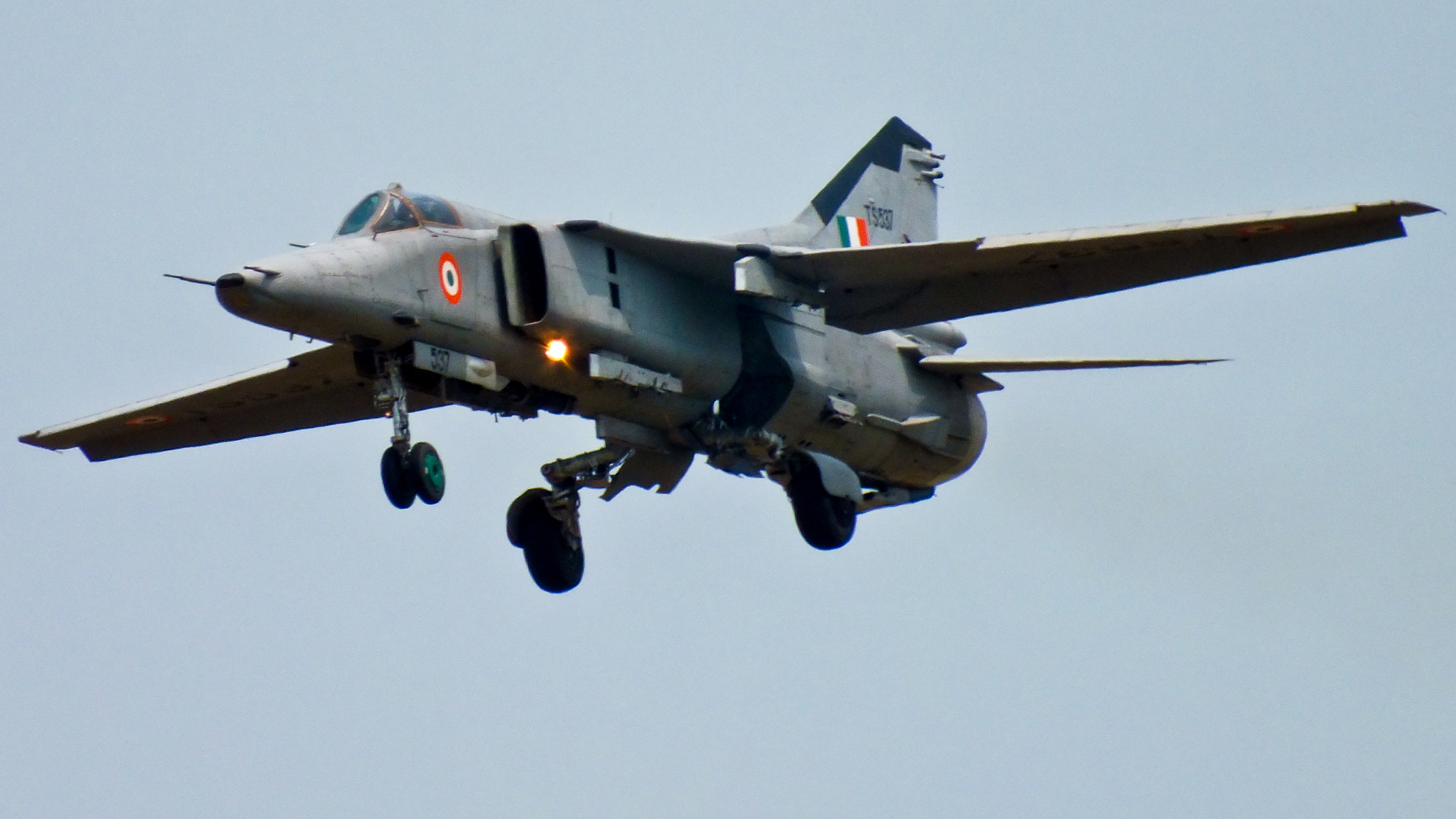
MiG-27 fighter used from the mid 1980s to 2010s

== See also ==
- List of active Indian military aircraft
- List of Indian naval aircraft
