= Harlow PJC-2 =

Type of aircraft

PJC-2
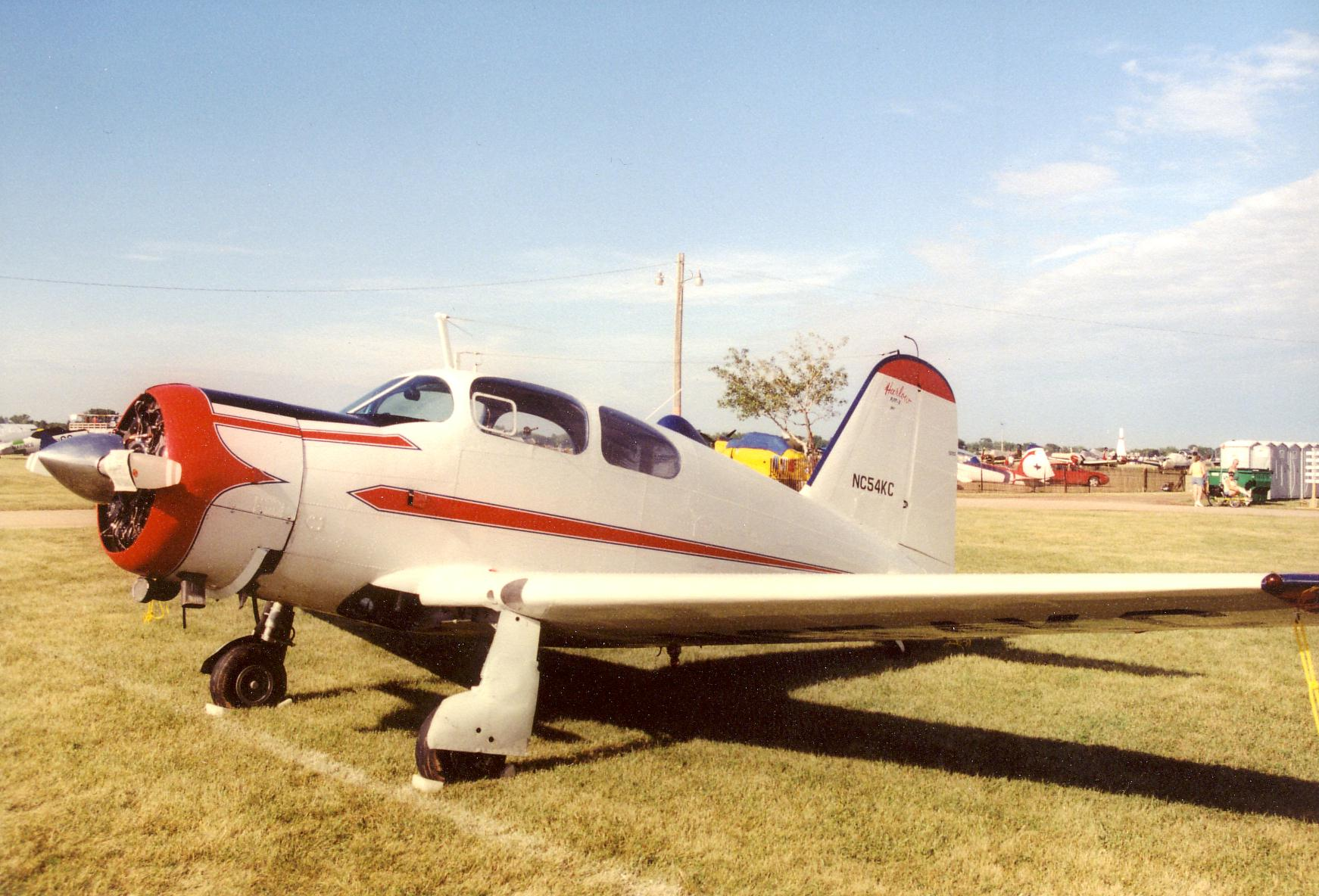
- Harlow PJC-2

General information
- Type: Four-seat cabin monoplane
- National origin: United States
- Manufacturer: Harlow Aircraft Company
- Designer: Max B. Harlow
- Number built: 11

History
- First flight: 1937
- Developed into: Harlow PC-5

The Harlow PJC-2 is a 1930s American four-seat cabin monoplane, designed by Max Harlow.

== Development ==
Max Harlow was an aeronautical engineer and instructor at the Pasadena Junior College. Under his tutelage, the aircraft designated PJC-1 was designed and built as a class project. The PJC-1 first flew on 14 September 1937 at Alhambra, California but it crashed during an extended (more than six turn) spin test with the center of gravity ballasted to the aft limit, as it was going through the certification process—a problem generally laid at the feet the unusually rigorous spin test requirement and the government test pilot, who bailed out of the airplane after the spin "flattened out." The airplane struck the ground, still in the "flat" (longitudinally level) attitude in a bean field near Mines Field (now Los Angeles International Airport) with considerable damage; although repairable, the PJC-1 was never returned to service. PJC students then built a slightly modified airplane, which limited aileron travel with full aft-stick and incorporated a slightly larger vertical stabilizer. This became the PJC-2 model, serial number 1 certified on 20 May 1938. It was one of the first, if not the first, airplane designed and built in the U.S. with a stressed-skin semi-monocoque structure—a revolutionary design feature for the time. Harlow saw the potential and formed the Harlow Aircraft Company to build PJC-2 aircraft at Alhambra Airport. Four aircraft were impressed into United States Army Air Forces service with the designation UC-80 in 1942, and used by Civil Aeronautics Administration inspectors after WWII.

== Design ==
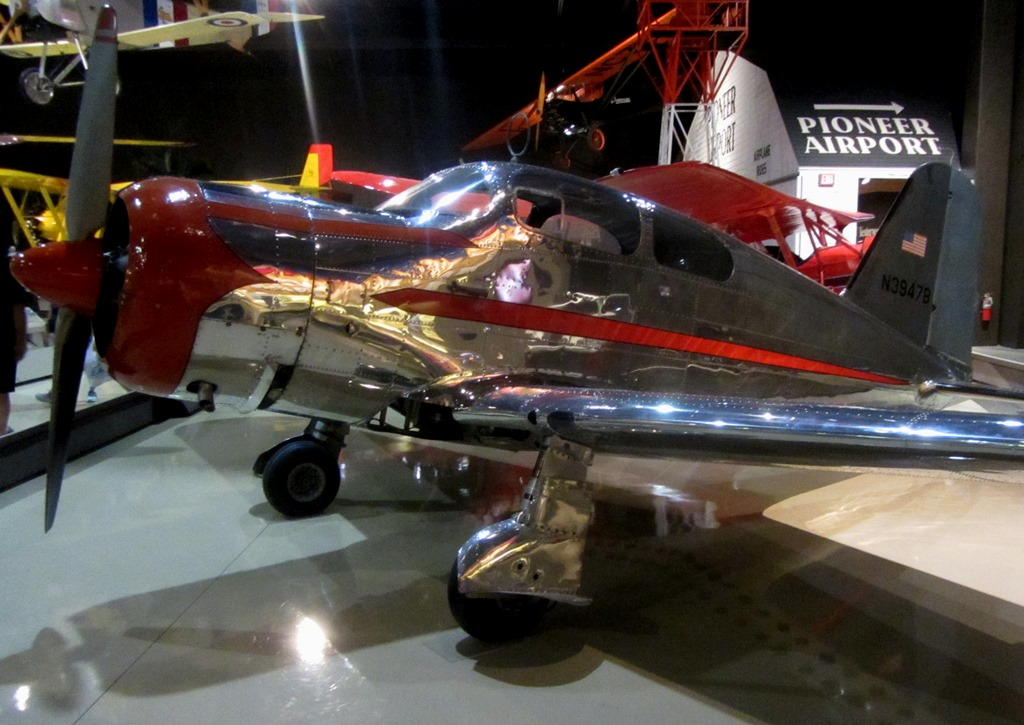
1940 Harlow PJC-2 on display at the EAA Aviation Museum

The PJC-2 was an all-metal low-wing cantilever monoplane with conventional low-set tailplane and a retractable tailwheel landing gear. A tandem two-seat version intended as a military trainer was developed as the Harlow PC-5.

== Operational history ==
In 1991, 3 PJC-2s were actively flying.

== Variants ==
PJC-1
Prototype, one built.
PJC-2
One prototype, serial number 1, a Warner Super Scarab radial engine, followed by 10 production airplanes. Most remaining examples have been re-engined with a Warner 165 HP or 185 HP engine.

== Specifications Harlow PJC-2 ==
Data from Jane's All the World's Aircraft 1940, The Illustrated Encyclopedia of Aircraft

General characteristics

- Crew: 1
- Capacity: 3 passengers / 535 lb (243 kg) payload
- Length: 23 ft 4 in (7.11 m)
- Wingspan: 35 ft 9.75 in (10.9157 m)
- Height: 7 ft 3 in (2.21 m)
- Wing area: 185 sq ft (17.2 m^{2})
- Airfoil: NACA 23012
- Empty weight: 1,661 lb (753 kg)
- Gross weight: 2,600 lb (1,179 kg)
- Powerplant: 1 × Warner Super Scarab SS-50 7-cylinder air-cooled radial piston engine, 145 hp (108 kW)
- Propellers: 2-bladed wooden propeller

Performance

- Maximum speed: 170 mph (270 km/h, 150 kn)
- Cruise speed: 153 mph (246 km/h, 133 kn)
- Landing speed: 50 mph (43 kn; 80 km/h)
- Range: 788 mi (1,268 km, 685 nmi)
- Service ceiling: 15,500 ft (4,700 m)
- Rate of climb: 800 ft/min (4.1 m/s)
- Wing loading: 14.05 lb/sq ft (68.6 kg/m^{2})
- Power/mass: 0.056 hp/lb (0.092 kW/kg)

== See also ==
Aircraft of comparable role, configuration, and era

- Globe Swift
- Spartan Executive
- Warren CP-1 - A student project to production aircraft.

Related lists

- List of aircraft of World War II
- List of military aircraft of the United States
