= Cub Aircraft =

Former Canadian aircraft manufacturer

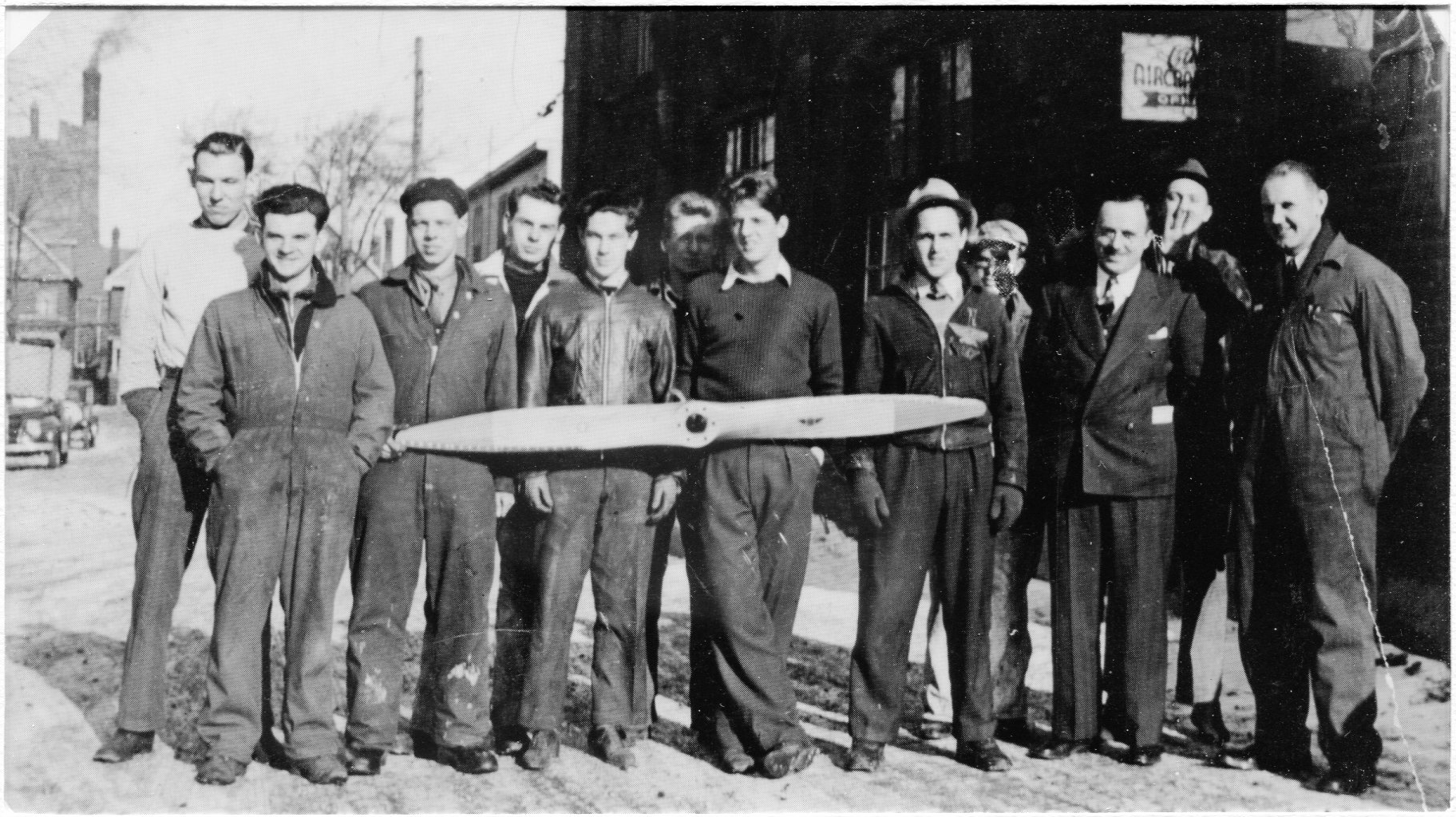
Cub Aircraft Canada c.1938. Adams Street, Hamilton, Ontario. (L-R) Don Andrews, Benny Keeler, Harold Humphreys, Ed Kenyon, Bert Duffin, Jack Hyslop, Al Andrew, Nick Nicholson, Mac Galbraith, R.L. Gibson - President, McGurk, Neil Christiansen.

Cub Aircraft was a Canadian aircraft manufacturer established at Hamilton, Ontario in 1937, originally to manufacture Piper Cubs for the Canadian market (under the name "Cub Prospector"). Production was interrupted by World War II, In 1941 they also commenced building Harlow PJC-5s. Although the company resumed business afterwards, it did not survive for more than a few years.
