= Atlas H-10 =

H-10
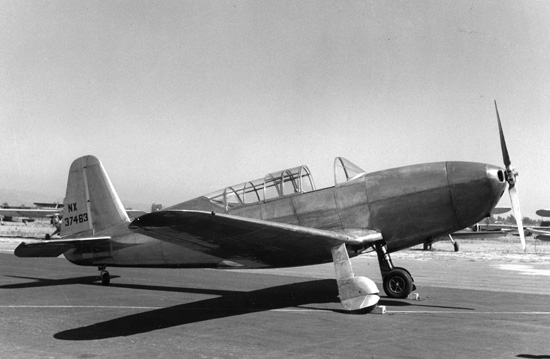

General information
- Type: Civil utility aircraft
- Manufacturer: Atlas Aircraft
- Designer: Max B. Harlow
- Number built: 1

History
- First flight: 4 October 1945

The Atlas H-10 was the prototype for a four-seat cabin monoplane aircraft, registered N37463, designed by Max Harlow, which was flown in the United States shortly after World War II. After the war, the airframe was completed by students at Pasadena Junior College and developed into the PCC-10 before being redesignated the Atlas H-10. The aircraft was a low-wing, all-metal monoplane with a semi-monocoque structure and retractable landing gear. It first flew in the postwar period and was initially powered by a Lycoming O-435 engine. During its development, the aircraft was experimentally fitted with two Continental O-300 engines mounted in tandem and driving counter-rotating propellers. It was later converted back to a single-engine configuration, including the installation of a Franklin 6AB and eventually a 400-horsepower Lycoming IO-720. Only one H-10 was completed, making N37463 a unique example of Harlow’s postwar aircraft development. The aircraft continued to be seen in California for several decades, including at Long Beach in the 1960s and 1970s.

== History ==
The Atlas H-10 had been constructed from the unfinished Harlow PJC-4 sporting monoplane which had been left uncompleted at the outbreak of the conflict. The water heater company Rheem Manufacturing Company briefly invested in the project as the PCC-10 (Pasadena City College Model 10) but did not pursue the business. Pasadena students completed the aircraft, and its first flight was on 4 October 1945 with a 220 hp Lycoming.

It was a low-wing cantilever monoplane of aluminum semi-monocoque configuration with retractable tailwheel undercarriage and powered by a variety of engines throughout its life. Originally powered by a Lycoming O-435, it was re-engined with two Continental O-300s driving contra-rotating propellers through a common gearbox and registered as the Mono-Twin. In turn, this arrangement was replaced with a Franklin 6AB and finally a Lycoming IO-720, each driving a single propeller. The cabin layout was also modified.

== Operational history ==
Only the single H-10 was completed and flown. In the early 1970s it was based at Long Beach Airport in southern California. It was later revised and flown in the 1990's.

As of 2006, the aircraft was reportedly still in existence in a dismantled state in the hands of a Californian collector.

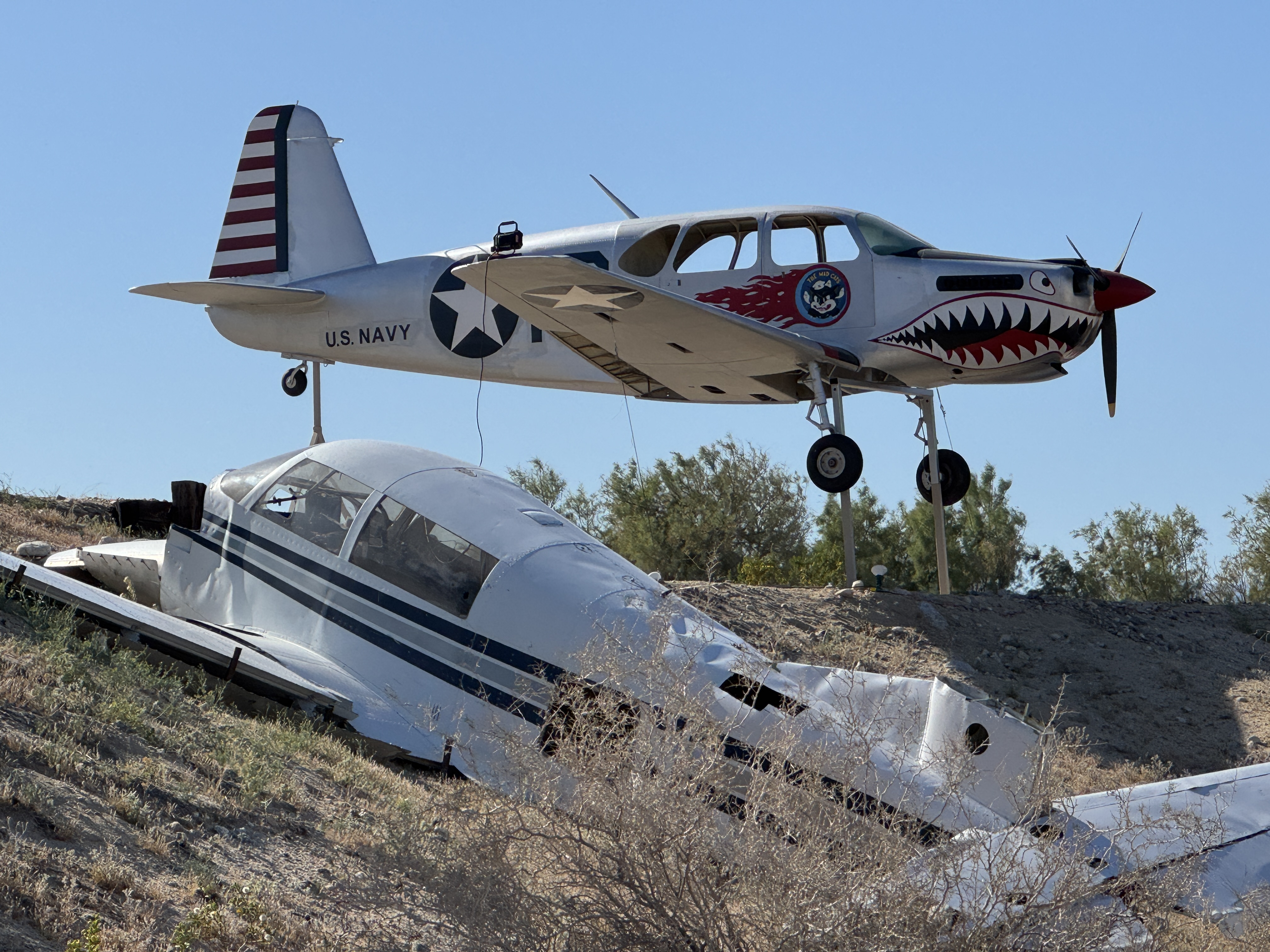
Atlas H-10 as photographed by owner of property in Ocotillo Wells, California.

As of 2024, the H-10 was re-assembled as a static display near Highway 78 in Ocotillo Wells, California.

== Variants ==
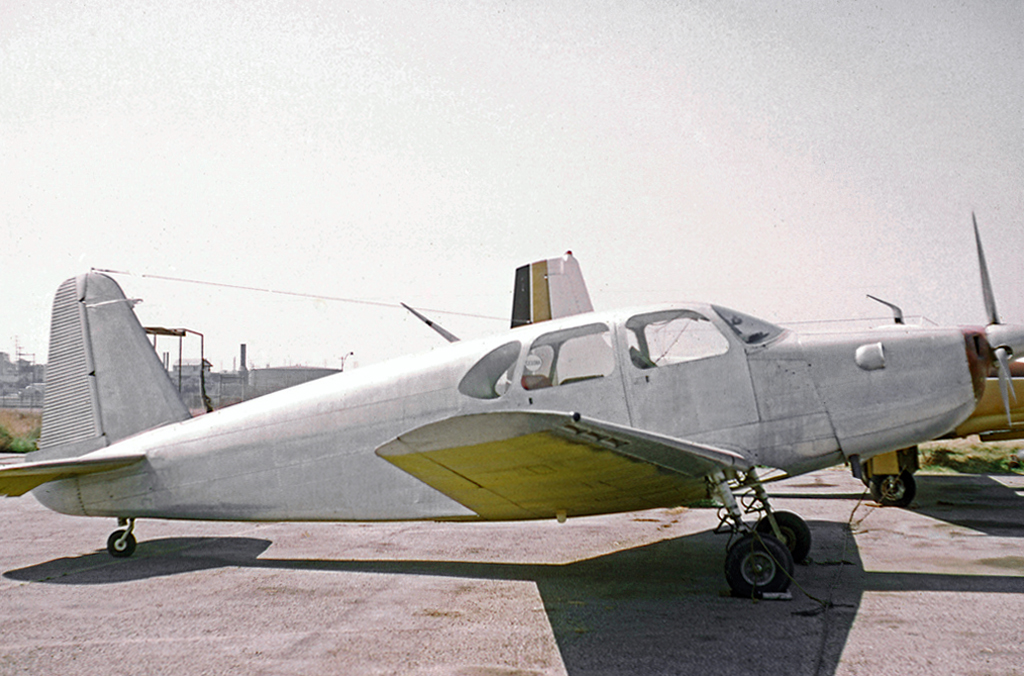
The sole Atlas H-10 in 1973 when fitted with a Lycoming IO-720 engine

Harlow PJC-4
Original design
Atlas PCC-10
Test aircraft
Atlas H-10
Redesignated production aircraft
Atlas Mono-Twin
Re-engined prototype with twin radial

== Specifications (with Continental engines) ==
General characteristics

- Crew: one pilot
- Capacity: three passengers
- Length: 28 ft 4 in (8.64 m)
- Wingspan: 35 ft 9 in (10.90 m)
- Powerplant: 2 × Continental O-300 , 145 hp (108 kW) each

Performance

- Maximum speed: 170 mph (274 km/h, 150 kn)
