= Atlas Aircraft =

1940s aircraft manufacturer in the United States

Atlas Aircraft was a short-lived American aircraft manufacturer founded at Hemet, California by J.B. Alexander and Max B. Harlow shortly after World War II. The firm developed a light civil aircraft, the H-10, based on a pre-war design by Harlow but was unable to find buyers for it.
