= Roland Garros (aviator) =

20th-century early French pilot

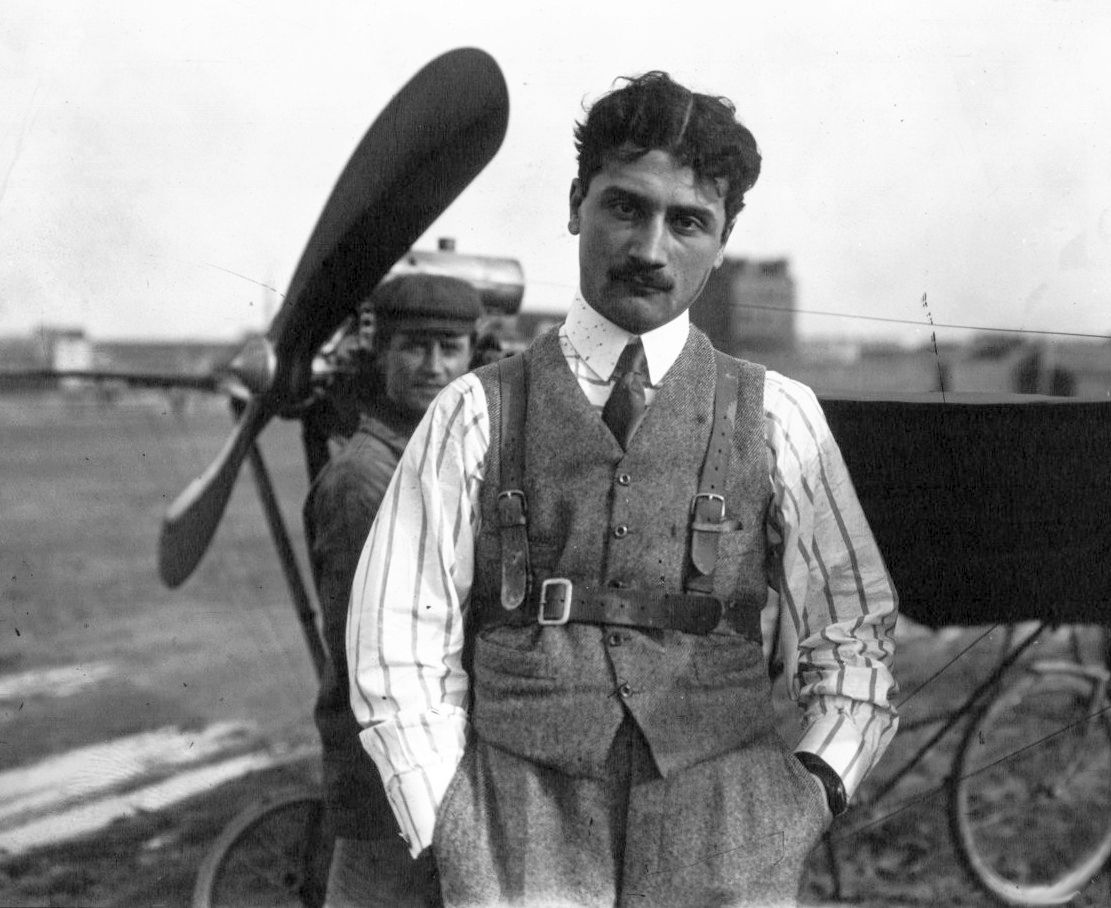
- Roland Garros in front of a Demoiselle plane in 1910
- Born: Eugène Adrien Roland Georges Garros; 6 October 1888; Saint-Denis, Réunion, France
- Died: 5 October 1918 (aged 29); Vouziers, Ardennes, France
- Burial place: Vouziers, France
- Education: HEC Paris
- Military career
- Allegiance: France
- Branch: French Air and Space Force
- Awards: Chevalier de la Légion d'honneur (1913); Officier de la Légion d'honneur (1918)

Eugène Adrien Roland Georges Garros (French: [ʁɔlɑ̃ ɡaʁos]; 6 October 1888 – 5 October 1918) was a French aviation pioneer and fighter pilot. A self-taught pilot, he performed many early aviation feats such as the first-ever airplane crossing of the Mediterranean Sea in 1913. He later joined the French Army and became one of the earliest fighter pilots during First World War.

Born in Saint-Denis, Réunion, Garros developed an interest in aviation from a young age. He began his career in 1909, flying a Santos-Dumont Demoiselle, and gained his licence a year later. Following successful performances in several air races and multiple altitude records, Garros achieved international fame in 1913 for making the first non-stop flight across the Mediterranean Sea, from southern France to Tunisia in a Morane-Saulnier G.

Garros enlisted as a reconnaissance pilot in the French Army on the outbreak of the First World War. He helped develop the first forward-firing machine gun mounted on a combat aircraft, with which he shot down his first German aircraft in early April 1915. In mid-April, after two more air victories, Garros' plane came down behind German lines due to engine trouble, and he spent nearly three years as a prisoner of war. He escaped captivity in early 1918 and rejoined the French Army, but was shot down and killed in the Ardennes later that year.

In 1928, the Roland Garros tennis stadium in Paris opened and was named in Garros' memory. The French Open, held in the stadium, officially takes his name.

== Biography ==
Roland Garros was born in Saint-Denis, Réunion, and studied at the Lycée Janson de Sailly and HEC Paris.

At the age of 12, he caught pneumonia, and was sent to Cannes to recover. He took up cycling to restore his health, and went on to win an inter-school championship in the sport. He was also keen on football, rugby and tennis. When he was 21 he started a car dealership in Paris. He was a close friend of Ettore Bugatti and in 1913 became the first owner of the Garros Bugatti Type 18, later named Black Bess by its second owner, British racing driver Ivy Cummings, which survives today at the Louwman Museum in the Netherlands.

=== Aviation ===
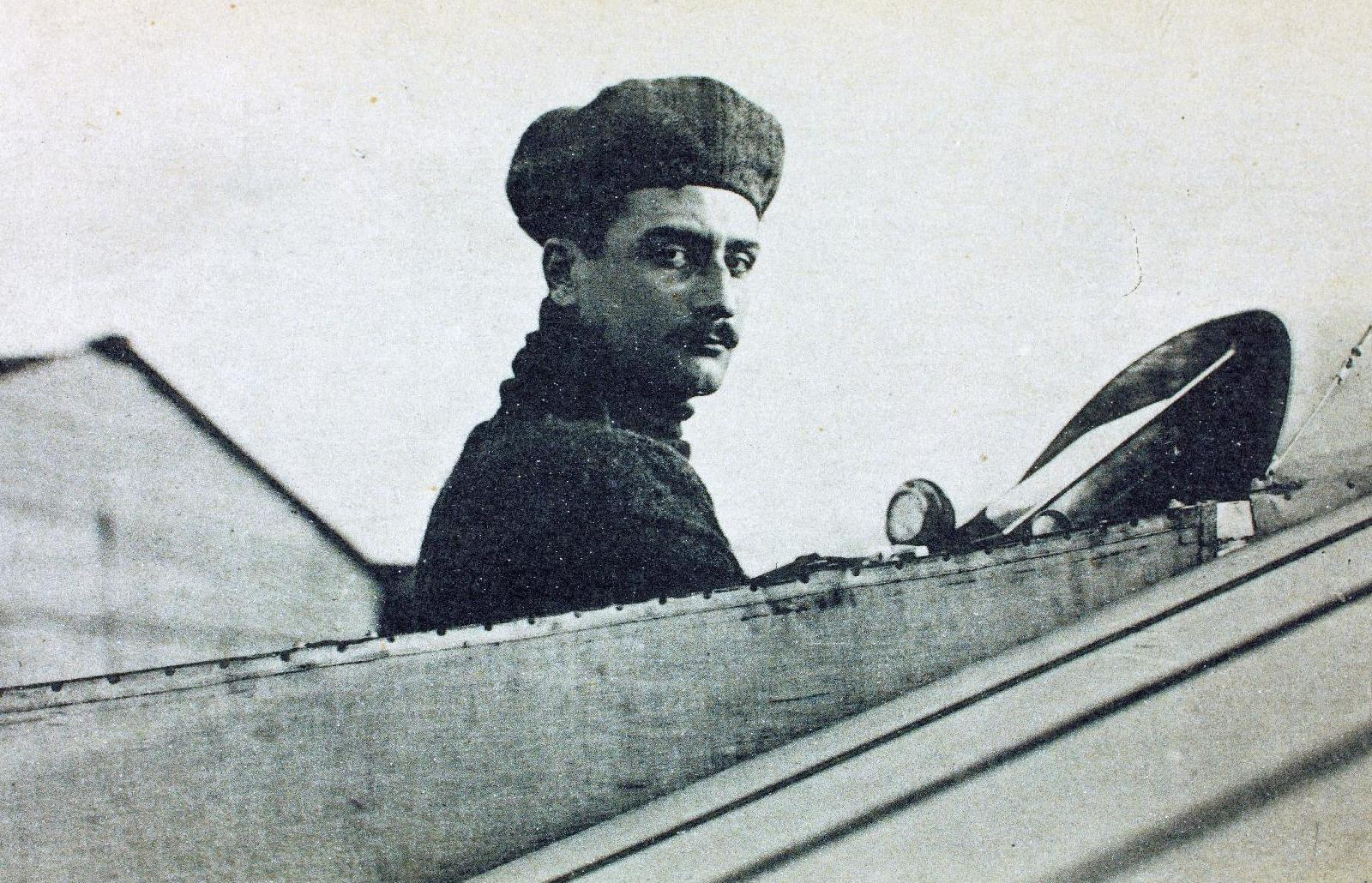
Garros in an aircraft cockpit

During Garros's summer holiday in 1909, at Sapicourt near Reims, staying with a friend's uncle, he saw the Grande Semaine d'Aviation de la Champagne which ran from 22 to 29 August. After this, he knew he had to be an aviator.

He started his aviation career in 1909 flying a Demoiselle (damselfly) monoplane, an aircraft that flew well only if it had a small lightweight pilot. He gained Ae.C.F. licence no. 147 in July 1910. In 1911 Garros graduated to flying Blériot XI monoplanes and entered a number of European air races with this type of aircraft, including the 1911 Paris to Madrid air race and the Circuit of Europe (Paris–London–Paris), in which he came second.

On 4 September 1911, he set an altitude record of 3,950 m (12,960 ft). The following year, on 6 September 1912, after Austrian aviator Philipp von Blaschke had flown to 4,360 m (14,300 ft), he regained the height record by flying to 5,610 m (18,410 ft).

By 1913 he was flying the faster Morane-Saulnier monoplanes, and on 23 September gained fame for making the first non-stop flight across the Mediterranean Sea from Fréjus-Saint Raphaël in the south of France to Bizerte in Tunisia in a Morane-Saulnier G. The flight commenced at 5:47 am and lasted for nearly eight hours, during which time Garros resolved two engine malfunctions. The following year, Garros joined the French army at the outbreak of World War I.

=== Myth of first air battle ===
Reports published in August 1914 claimed Garros was involved in the "first air battle in world history" and that he had flown his plane into a Zeppelin, destroying the airship and killing its pilots and himself. This story was quickly contradicted by reports that Garros was alive and well in Paris. Such early reports maintained that an unidentified French pilot had indeed rammed and destroyed a Zeppelin. However, German authorities denied the story. Later sources indicated the first aerial victory against a Zeppelin occurred in June 1915 and earlier reports, including that of Garros, were discounted.

=== Development of interrupter gear ===
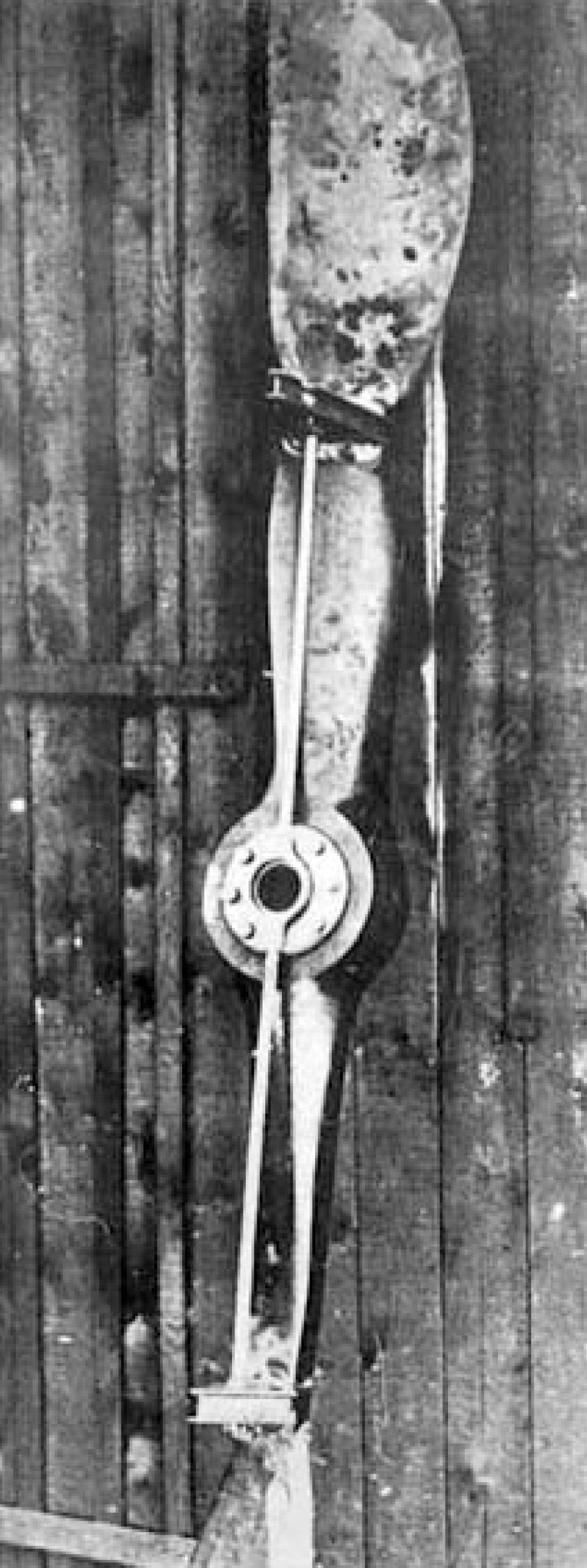
Garros's propeller, with its bullet deflectors, after being recovered from his downed aircraft

In the early stages of the air war in World War I, the problem of mounting a forward-firing machine gun on combat aircraft—without having the bullets hit the propeller—was considered by several people. As a reconnaissance pilot with the Escadrille MS26, Garros had made several attempts at shooting down German aircraft; however, these efforts were unsuccessful due to the difficulty in hitting an aircraft with a hand-held carbine. He visited the Morane-Saulnier works in November or December 1914 to discuss the problem.

Raymond Saulnier had begun work on a synchroniser (which times the firing of the gun with the position of the propeller) before World War I and had taken out a patent for a workable mechanism by 14 April 1914. However, circumstances beyond his control resulted in its being tested with the Hotchkiss 09/13 portative machine gun, which proved unsuitable due to an inconsistent firing rate. As a workaround, Garros, with the help of his mechanic, Jules Hue, developed protective wedges, which were fitted to the slightly narrowed propeller blades which deflected the occasional round which would have otherwise struck the propeller. With a workable installation now fitted to his Morane-Saulnier G monoplane, Garros achieved the first ever shooting-down of an aircraft by a fighter firing through a tractor propeller, on 1 April 1915, and two more victories over German aircraft were achieved on 15 and 18 April 1915. The Aero Club of America awarded him a medal for this invention three years later.

On 18 April 1915, the fuel line of his Morane Saulnier Type G became clogged, causing engine trouble. He came down in German-controlled territory where he was grabbed by alert German infantrymen. The intact gun and propeller were quickly rushed to the Aeronautik GmbH factory in Germany, founded by Dutch aviator Anthony Fokker, famous during World War I for its fighter aircraft. Fokker quickly dismissed the steel deflector plates and designed a practical interrupter gear for use on the Fokker E.I Monoplane. The interrupter gear began the "Fokker Scourge", and for a time Germany had the upper hand in the air war.

=== POW camp internment and escape ===
Garros was almost three years in captivity in various German POW camps, including in Küstrin and Mainz. He managed to escape on 14 February 1918 together with fellow aviator lieutenant Anselme Marchal. They made it to London via the Netherlands and from there he returned to France where he rejoined the French army. He returned to Escadrille 26 to pilot a SPAD S.XIII, and claimed two victories on 2 October 1918, one of which was confirmed.

=== Death ===
On 5 October 1918, Garros was shot down and killed near Vouziers, Ardennes, a month before the end of the war and one day short of his 30th birthday. His adversary was probably German ace Hermann Habich from Jasta 49, flying a Fokker D.VII.

== Legacy ==
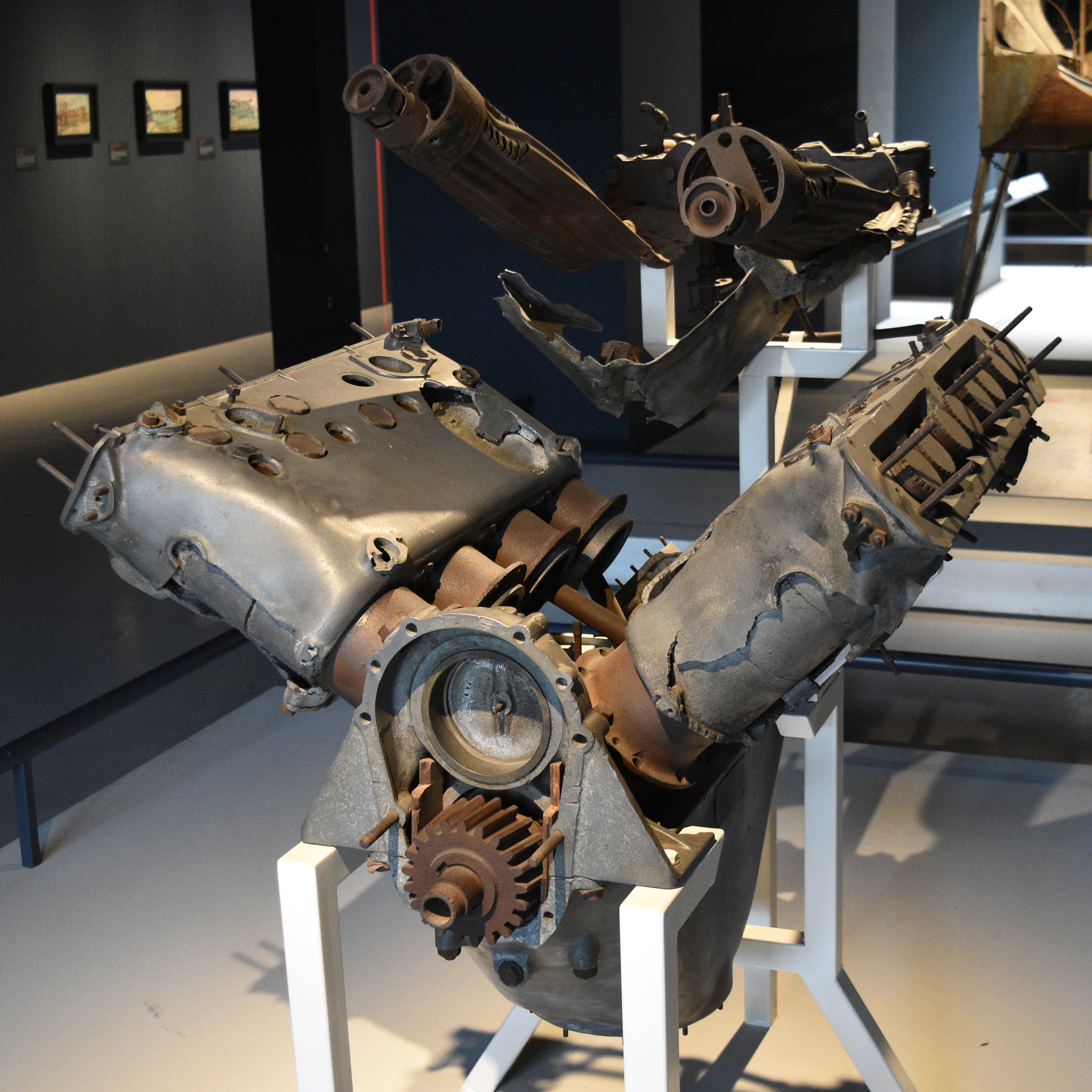
Engine and machine guns of Garros's final aircraft, on display at Musée de l'air et de l'espace in Paris

Garros is sometimes called the world's first fighter ace; however, he shot down only four aircraft, while the criterion for "ace" was set at five or more victories. The honour of becoming the first ace went to another French airman, Adolphe Pégoud, who had six victories early in the war.

The Stade Roland Garros tennis centre constructed in Paris in the 1920s was named after him. It accommodates the French Open, one of the four Grand Slam tennis tournaments. Consequently, the tournament is officially called Les Internationaux de France de Roland-Garros (the "French Internationals of Roland Garros").

La Réunion's international airport is named the Roland Garros Airport. There is a monument to Garros in Bizerte at the site of his landing, which is called "Roland Garros Plaza". The town of Houlgate in Normandy has named their promenade after Roland Garros in celebration of the town's beach being the location where he broke the altitude record.

According to Vũ Trọng Phụng's urban novel, Dumb Luck (1936), during colonial times the Hanoi government named the city's main tennis stadium after Roland Garros.

The French car manufacturer Peugeot commissioned a 'Roland Garros' limited-edition version of its 205 model in celebration of the tennis tournament that bears his name. The model included special paint and leather interior. Because of the success of this special edition, Peugeot later created Roland Garros editions of its 106, 108, 206, 207, 208, 306, 307, 308, 406, and 806 models.

== Honors and awards ==
- Officer of the Order of Legion of Honour
- Croix de guerre 1914-1918

== See also ==
- History of the Armée de l'Air (1909–1942)
