= Winifred Pink =

British racing car driver

Winifred Martha Pink
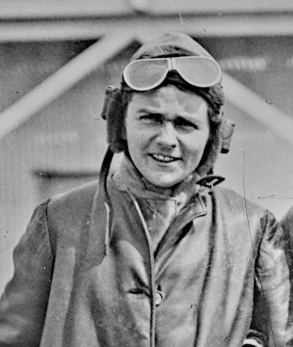
- Winifred Pink in the 1920s
- Born: 10 September 1896; Bromley
- Died: 18 December 1957 (aged 61)
- Known for: Motor racing

Winifred Pink (10 September 1896 – 18 December 1957) was an early English racing car driver, driving instructor and mechanical engineer. She was one of the last Presidents of the Ladies' Automobile Club in 1927.

== Early life and family ==
Winifred Martha Pink was born in Bromley, London on 10 September 1896 to Edward and Ellen; she also had four older step-siblings. Pink spent her childhood in Putney and later in Weston-Super-Mare. Her grandfather had established the family jam business in 1860 in Bermondsey, London. The business became the largest jam business in the world by the late 19th century and was profitable for the family. On his death in 1916, Pink's father left her mother and Pink £68,000, equivalent to over £6 million today. This kind of wealth would have enabled the Pink family to own a car. Following her father's death, Pink and her mother moved to Taunton.

Pink began driving in around 1910, but when World War 1 started, she did not own a car. However, her brother Sidney was a motoring enthusiast and Secretary of the Somerset Automobile Club for many years. Pink also worked for a season in a local car repair garage, picking up some mechanical skills.

== World War 1 ==
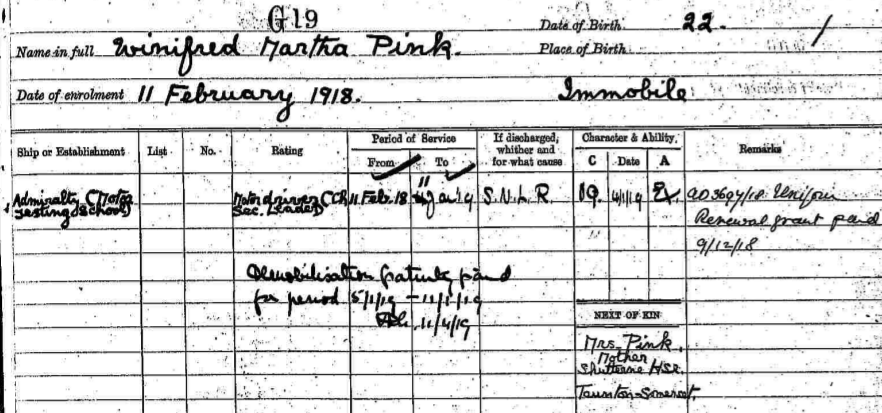
Admiralty Card in 1918

In 1915 Pink joined the Voluntary Aid Detachment (VAD) and eventually became a general service nurse. She eventually moved into the ambulance service and later became an instructor at the VAD motor School. Pink was also looking after her mother during this time, so she was not dispatched overseas as some other VAD nurses were. In 1918 she joined the Women's Royal Naval Service (WRNS) and continued to drive vehicles at the Admiralty Motor Testing School.

== Motorsport ==
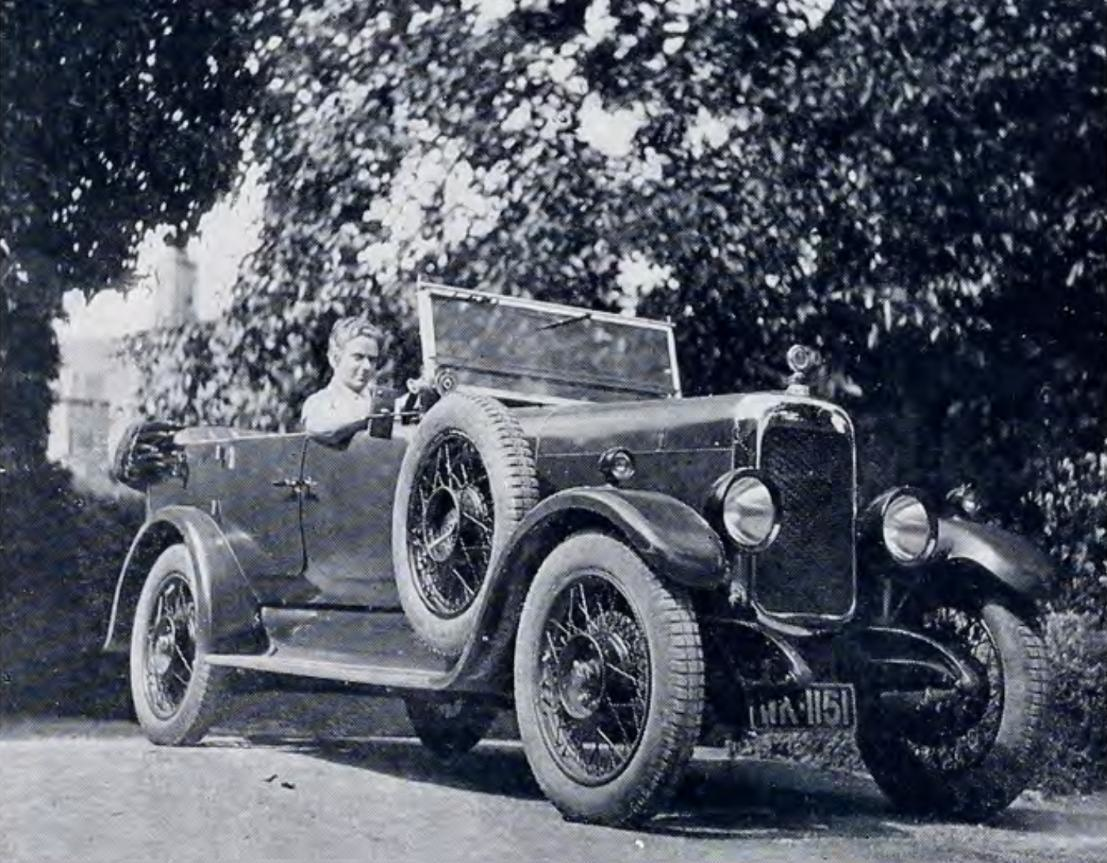
Winifred Pink in her Alvis car

In 1921 Pink purchased her first car, a polished aluminium 10.5 horsepower Eric-Campbell two seater. She competed with this vehicle in a reliability trial in 1921 from Yeovil to Land's End. Pink placed third in the Light vehicle class, but won the cup as the other two participants were ruled out.

Pink's second car was a 1921 Horstman "Super Sports" which she used in speed trials and hill climbs. In 1922 she won the Brooklands three mile ladies handicap at the Junior Car Club's Spring meeting. Later that year she came third in the ladies class for the Caerphilly hill climb and first in the one mile speed trial on Porthcawl sands ladies class and also came second in the 1200cc to 1500cc class.

In 1922 Pink created the new "Women's Motor Club". Their first event was a rally and gymkhana at the Lambert Arms in Aston Rowant. Pink won the skilful driving test during the gymkhana. The Club was unsuccessful and held few later events.

Unlike many other women in motorsport at the time Pink was known to singlehandedly prepare her car for races, a testament to her mechanical engineering capability.

Pink continued to compete into 1923, in General Efficiency Trials with a four-seater Horstman Tourer and in races and hillclimbs with her Horstman Super Sports. Later that year Pink bought an Aston Martin sports tourer which had previously been driven by Lionel Martin who had many successes across races, speed trials and hillclimbs. Pink also saw success with this car, and in her first event collected three first in class awards and two third class awards. She competed at the Southsea speed trials that same year winning a range of awards across different classes including two firsts. She was part of the event promotion alongside Lionel Martin, SF Edge and Ivy Cummings. Pink had further success at the Shelsey Walsh events two weeks later.

With Aston Martins, Pink continued to have success at many races, speed trials and hill climbs through 1924. The number of events reduced due to safety concerns and therefore so did Pink's appearances. In later events she drove a Montlhery and an Alvis.

In 1928 she writes in The Woman Engineer about fellow racing driver Ivy Cummings, noting that she was "one of the few women in complete control of a car at 80 miles per hour, alongside Mrs Scott and Ruth Urquhart Dykes".

There are no further records of Pink competing after 1929.

== World War II ==
At the outbreak of World War II Pink joined the Women's Voluntary Service and became the Long Transport Officer. In this role, Pink managed the maintenance and repair of the WVS vehicles throughout the London Blitz from a service garage, training three other women mechanics. Later in the war she also managed the training of women volunteering to drive ambulances.
