= Bugatti Type 18 =

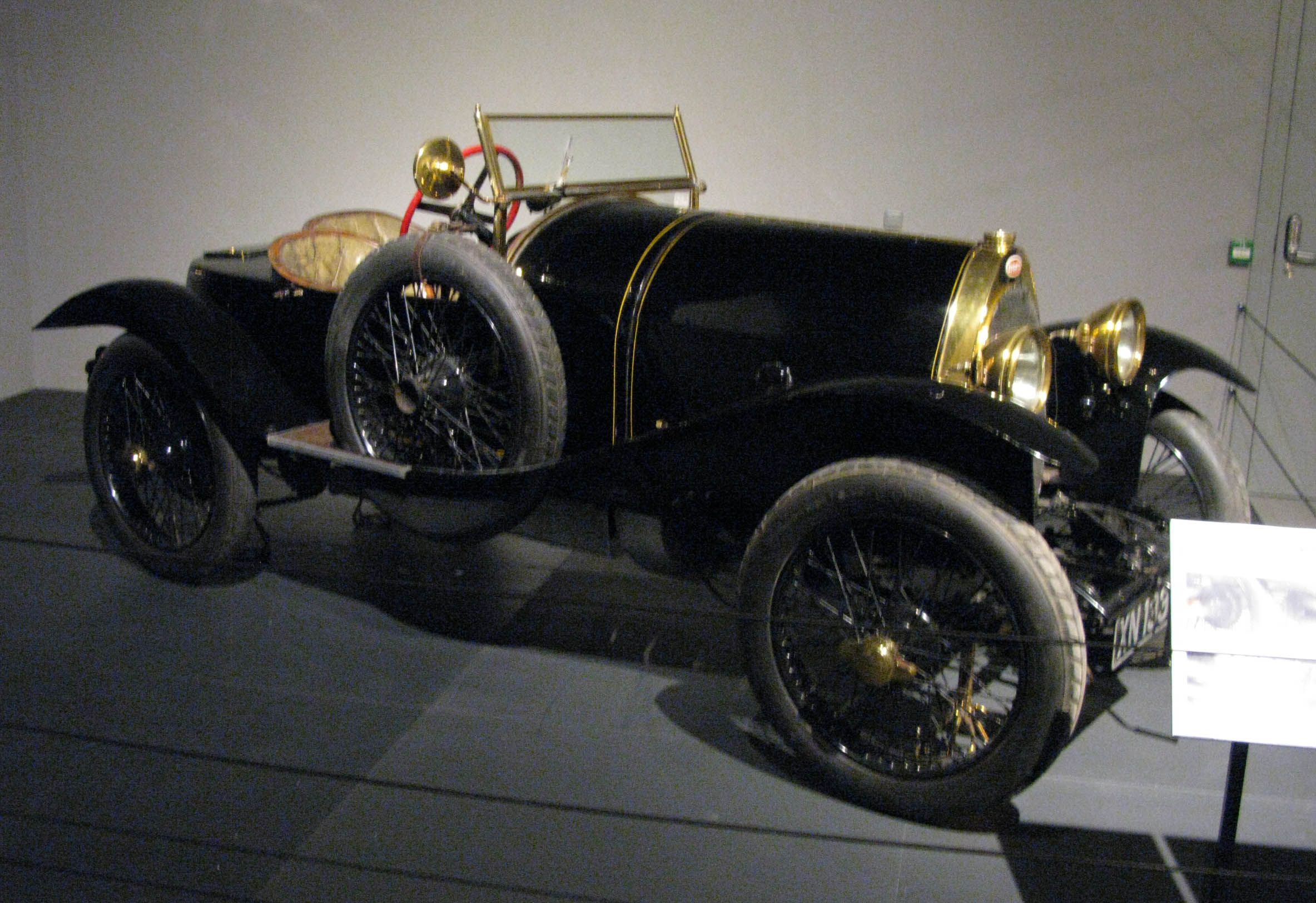
- Black Bess

Overview
- Manufacturer: Bugatti
- Production: 1912–1914
- Assembly: Germany: Molsheim, Alsace

Powertrain
- Engine: 5,027 cc (307 cu in) Straight-4
- Transmission: four-speed sliding-pinion gearbox final drive by side chains

Dimensions
- Wheelbase: 100.4 in (2,550.2 mm); Track 49.2 in (1,249.7 mm)
- Kerb weight: 2,750 lb (1,247 kg)

Bugatti Engine Type 18

Overview
- Manufacturer: Bugatti

Layout
- Configuration: vertical straight four-cylinder in front of the car
- Displacement: 5,027 cc (307 cu in)
- Cylinder bore: 100 mm (3.9 in)
- Piston stroke: 160 mm (6.3 in)
- Valvetrain: 2-inlet valves and 1-exhaust valve per cylinder mechanically operated by fingers between the overhead camshaft and the valves

Combustion
- Fuel system: ignition by high tension magneto

Output
- Power output: 100 bhp (75 kW; 100 PS) maximum r.p.m. 2,400; UK tax rating 24.8 h.p.
- Torque output: 219 lb⋅ft (297 N⋅m)

The Bugatti Type 18, also called the Garros, is an automobile produced from 1912 through 1914. Produced shortly after the start of the business, the design was something of a relic. It had much in common with the cars Ettore Bugatti had designed for Deutz Gasmotoren Fabrik but with the radiator of the Type 13. Only seven examples were built, and three are known to survive.

== Engine ==
Power came from a large 5.0 L (5027 cc/306 in³) straight-4 engine with 3 valves per cylinder and a single overhead camshaft. This large engine had a 100 mm bore and very long 160 mm stroke, so it could only rev to about 2400 rpm.

Power was transferred through a multi-plate metal-on-metal clutch to a 4-speed with reverse manual transmission. Two chains - one exposed each side outside of the main chassis rails - drove the rear wheels, with the factory providing three sets of rear wheel chain sprockets, which meant the maximum speed was close to 160 km/h (100 mph).

In spite of the advanced nature of its design the engine gives little of the harsh racing car impression. Again, in spite of the size of that engine it does not give the impression of a big car and in spite of the tall radiator the short wheelbase lends it the appearance of a small sports car. On the road that impression is reinforced, the delicacy of control makes it a joy to drive and one can still flick the gearlever about as you may do only in an early Bugatti. The subdued howl and occasional suggestion of snatch from the side chains remind that this is a period car. If this car is typical of what the Prince Henry Tours produced the Prince Henry period can only be regarded as a most important constituent of the Golden Age.

— Kent Karslake, road test, 1956.

== Chassis No. 474 "Black Bess" ==
The first car in the series, No.471, was actively campaigned by Ettore Bugatti himself in competition in 1912. No.472 was delivered new to Paris, and No.473 was delivered new to Alfred Hielle of Schoenlinde, a close friend of Ettore Bugatti.

Chassis No.474 was also sold to a friend of Ettore's in a marketing coup, the French aviator and sportsman Roland Garros (1888-1918). On supply of his chassis on 18 September 1913, Garros commissioned a torpedo-body by Labourdette with off-set seating. Having been flying and piloting early aeroplanes privately since 1910, at the start of World War I Garros became a French Army fighter pilot, and was killed in 1918. A keen tennis player, the French Open was named after Garros in 1927. The car was sold post WWI to Louis Coatalen, the chief engineer of the Sunbeam Motor Car Company. In 1922 it was bought by British racing driver and garage owner Ivy Cummings. She named the car "Black Bess" after highway man Dick Turpin's mare. The car had a considerable career at Brooklands in the 1920's. In 1925 it was sold to Oxford University student L H Preston, who continued to race the car under the name "Black Bess". Sold a year later to a then young actor James Robertson Justice, he had it shipped to McEvoy’s of Derby to be rebuilt. Due to time pressures on McEvoy's to complete other projects and Justice's lack of cash funds, it was found in 1933 by Bill Boddy (later editor of Motor Sport magazine), and subsequently purchased from McEvoy's by Bugatti UK Owners’ Club president Colonel G.M. Giles. Fully restored, it was then raced again by the Colonel and his brother Eric at classic racing events. Stored during World War II, it was bought in 1948 for £400 and joined a private collection in the UK, where it remained until 1988. "Black Bess" was bought on 7 February 2009 for €2,427,500 by Bonhams in Paris, and is now on public display in the Louwman Museum in the Netherlands.

Black Bess at Louwman Museum The Hague, coachwork is by Henri Labourdette

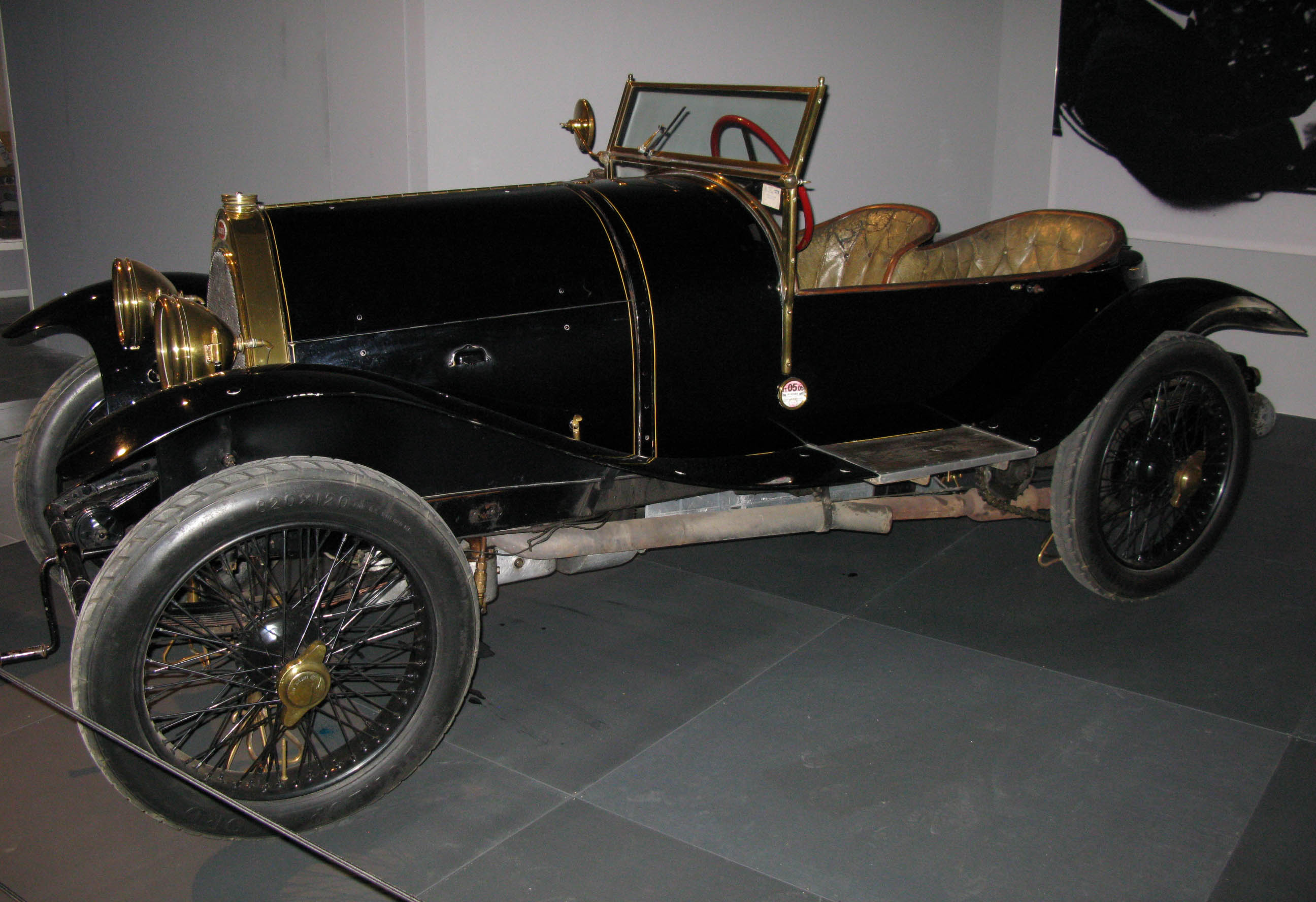

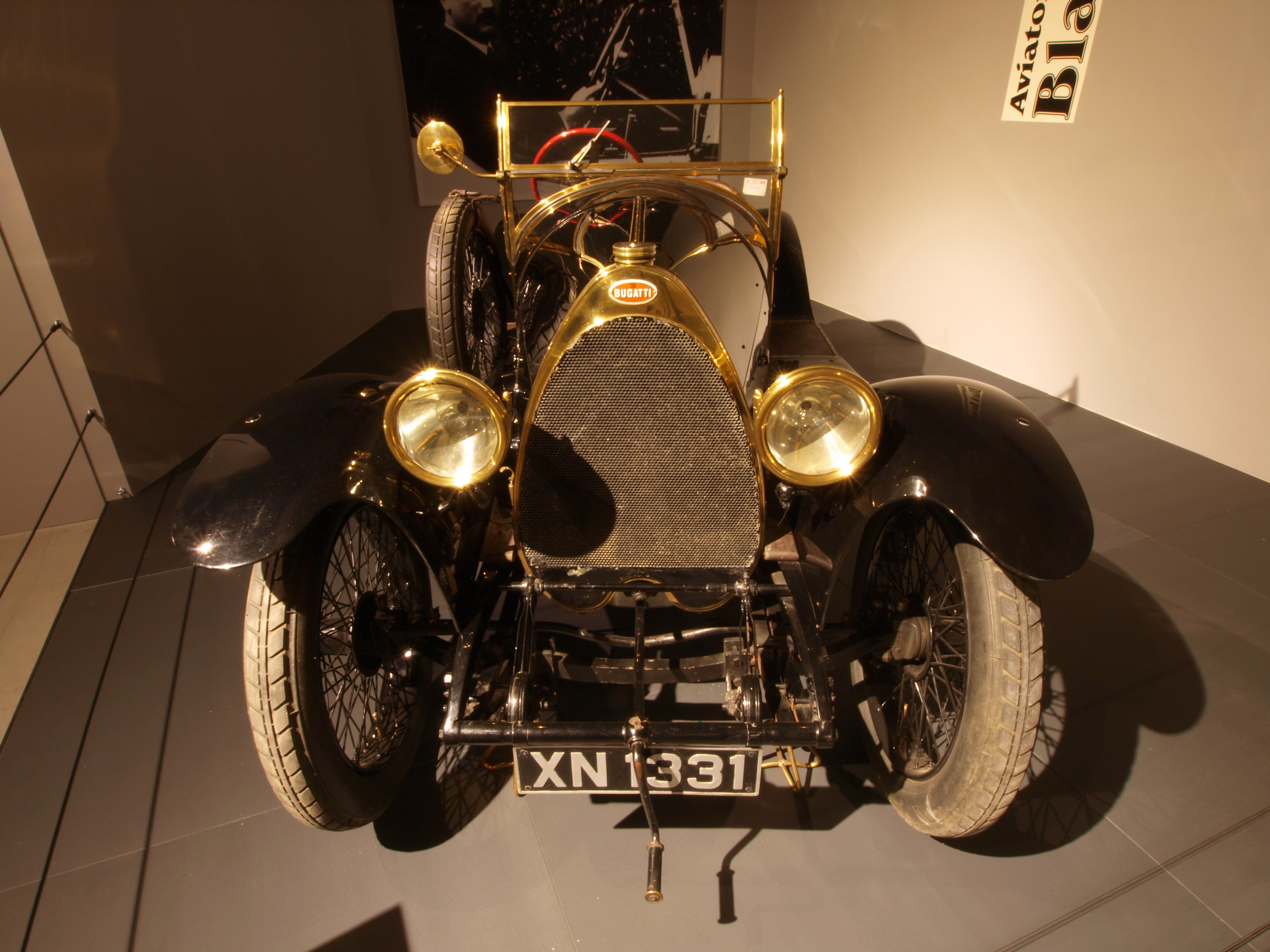

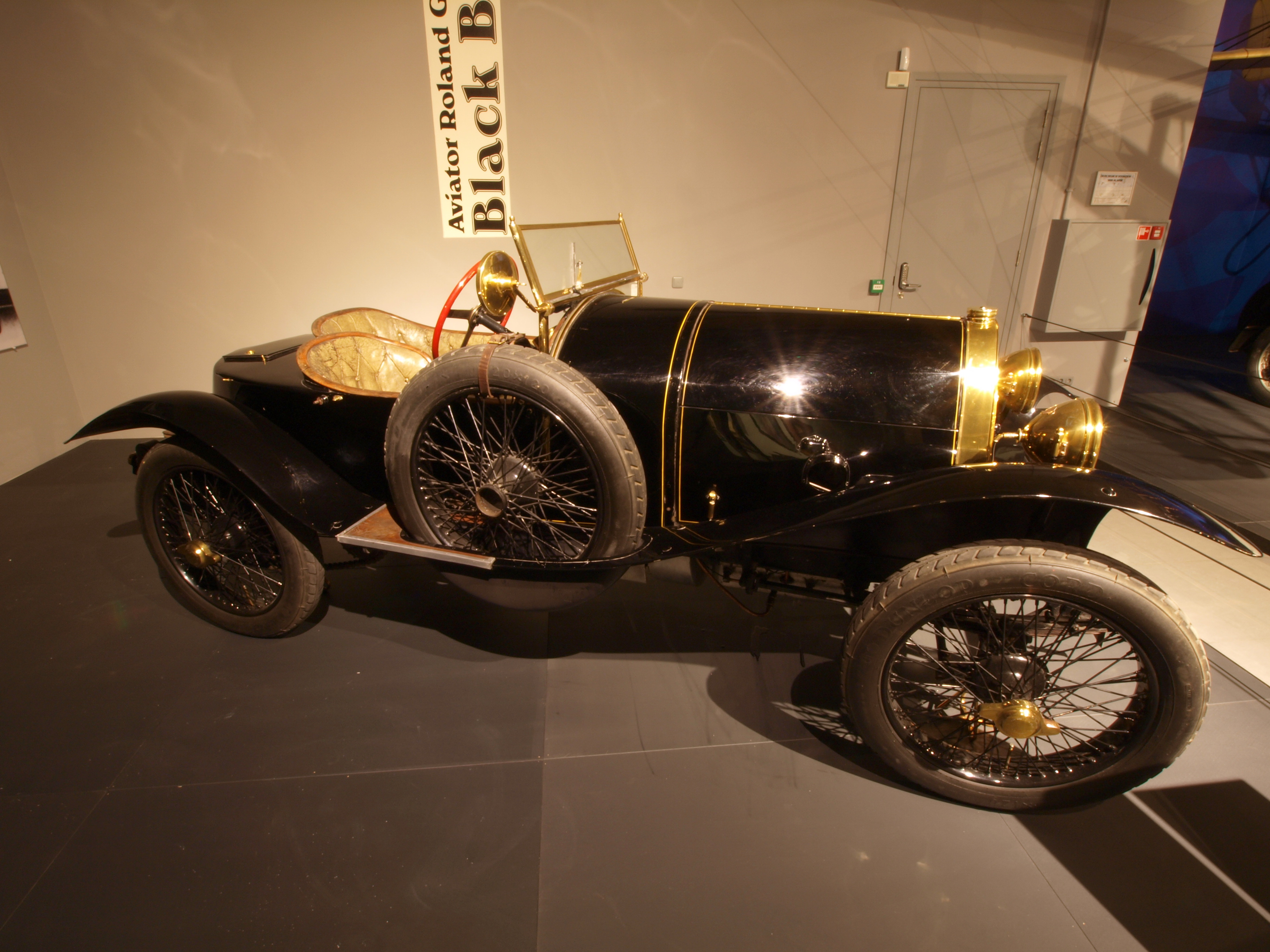

== Surviving examples ==
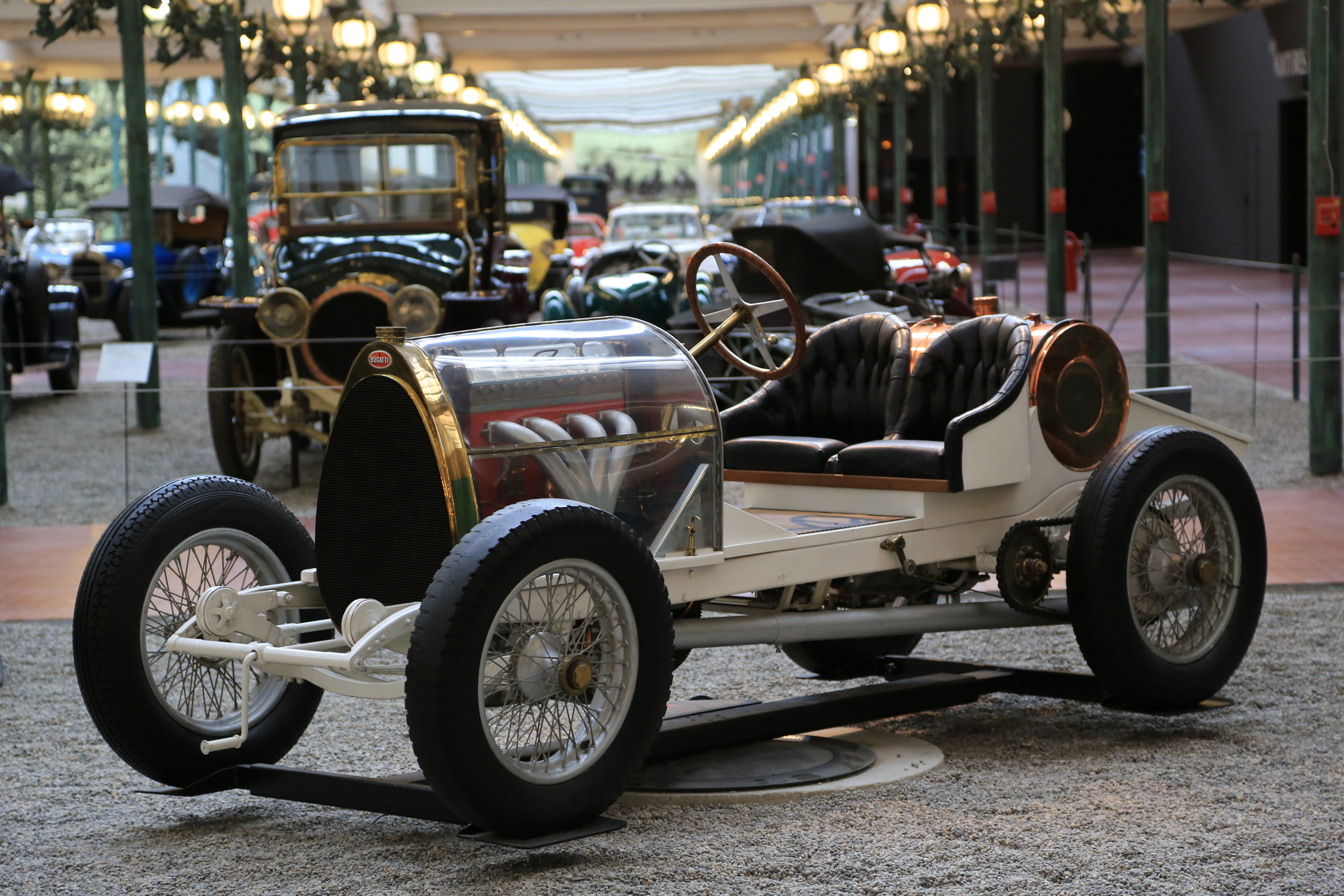
No. 715 at Schlumpf, Mulhouse, 2014

There are three cars surviving. Alongside "Black Bess"", No.715 is on public display at the Schlumpf Collection, Musée National de l'Automobile de Mulhouse in France. The third car, on chassis No.471 but with a different chassis's engine, is privately owned in England.
