= Louwman Museum =

Automobile museum in The Hague, Netherlands

Coordinates: 52°5′59.21″N 4°21′1.81″E

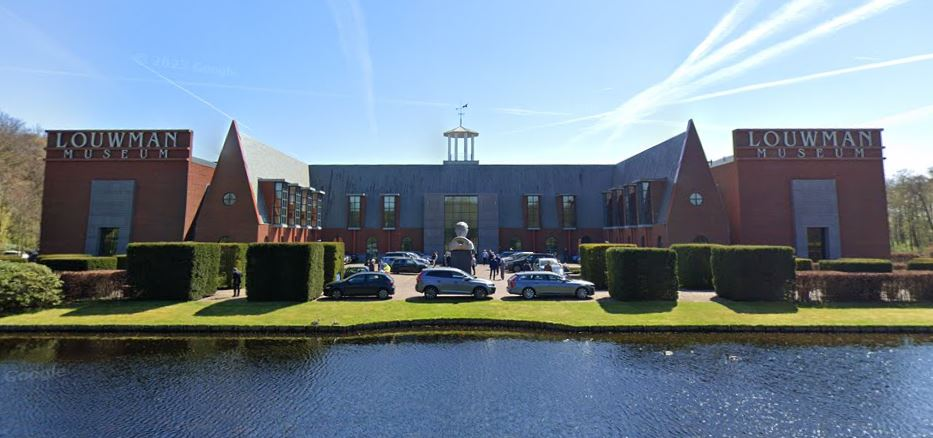
- Front of the museum in 2023
- Former name: Nationaal Automobiel Museum
- Established: 1969; 57 years ago
- Location: 1969–1981: Leidschendam; 1981–2010: Raamsdonksveer since 2010: The Hague, Netherlands
- Type: Car museum
- Website: http://www.louwmanmuseum.nl

The Louwman Museum is a museum for historic cars, coaches, and motorcycles in The Hague, Netherlands. It has been situated on the Leidsestraatweg near the A44 motorway since 2010. The museum's former names are "Nationaal Automobiel Museum" and "Louwman Collection".

== History ==
The collection consists of around 275 cars and other vehicles. It was founded in 1934 with the purchase of a 20-year-old Dodge by Dodge importer Pieter Louwman, the father of the current owner. In 1969, the collection of Mr. Geerlig Riemer was added. Riemer was also founder of the Institute for Automotive and Management (IVA) in Driebergen. The building which used to house Riemer's collection has since been used as a practical center for the IVA.

In 1969 the collection was moved to Leidschendam to the newly opened National Automobile Museum. In 1981 the museum was moved to a new location on the property of importer Louwman & Parqui in Raamsdonksveer. On 18 April 2003 the name "Louwman Collection" was adopted.

On 3 July 2010 the current museum in The Hague, named Louwman Museum, was opened by Queen Beatrix of the Netherlands, whose former home Huis ten Bosch neighbours the museum. The current owner of the collection is Evert Louwman, the Dutch importer of Lexus, Toyota, and Suzuki.

== Building ==
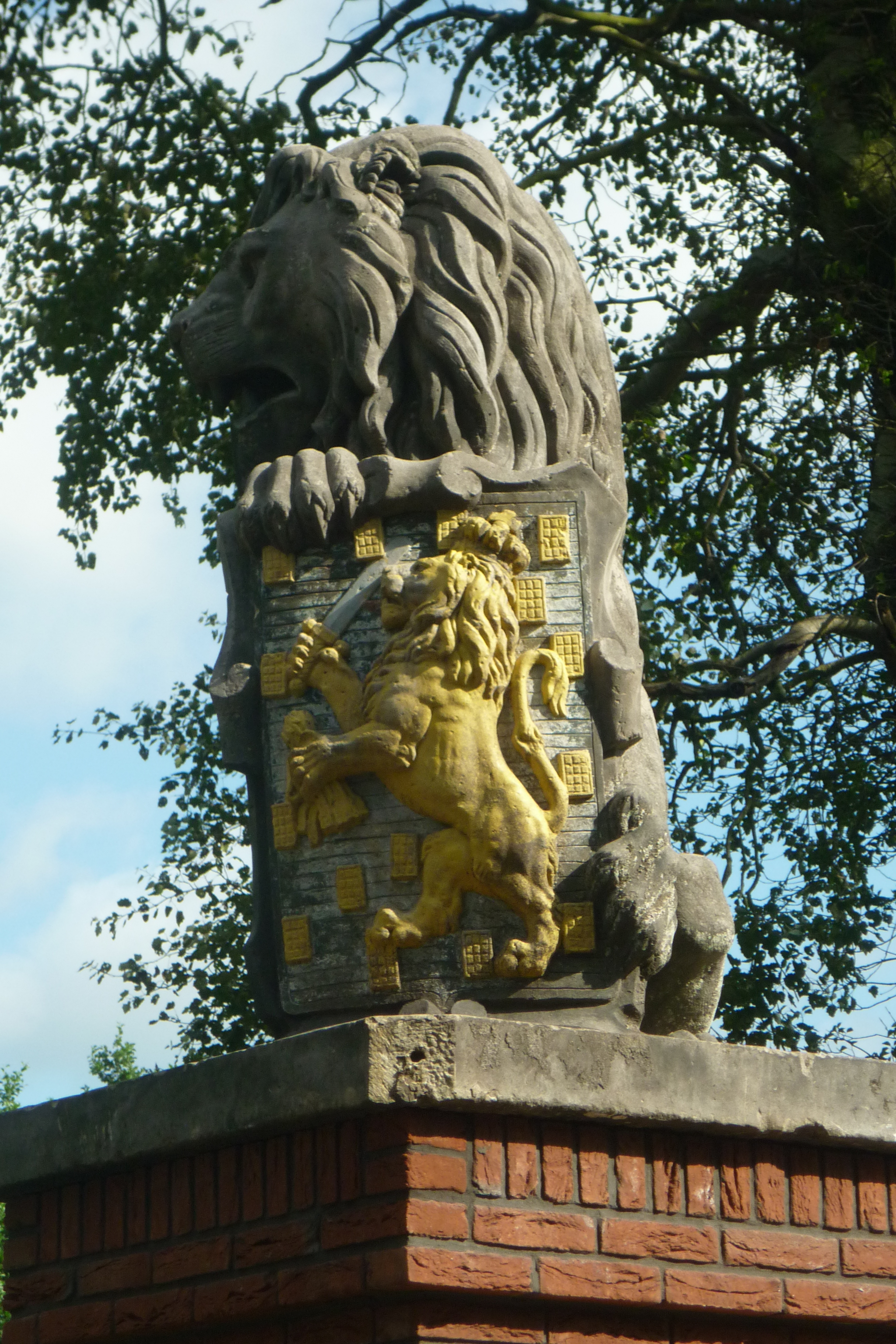
Sculpted lion at the museum's gate

The Louwman Museum is housed in a building with three floors and over 10,000 m² of exhibition space, on The Hague's Leidsestraatweg. It was specifically designed as a museum by Driehaus Prize winner Michael Graves, a New Classical American architect. Incorporating a view of the surrounding environment was an important part of the large-scale design. Landscape architect Louis Baljon designed the layout of the park encircling the building.

Evert Louwman is the brother of Jan Louwman, owner of the former Wassenaar Zoo, which closed in 1985. The zoo used to have a gate with two brick pillars on which two lions stood. This old gate became the entrance to the new museum.

== Collection ==
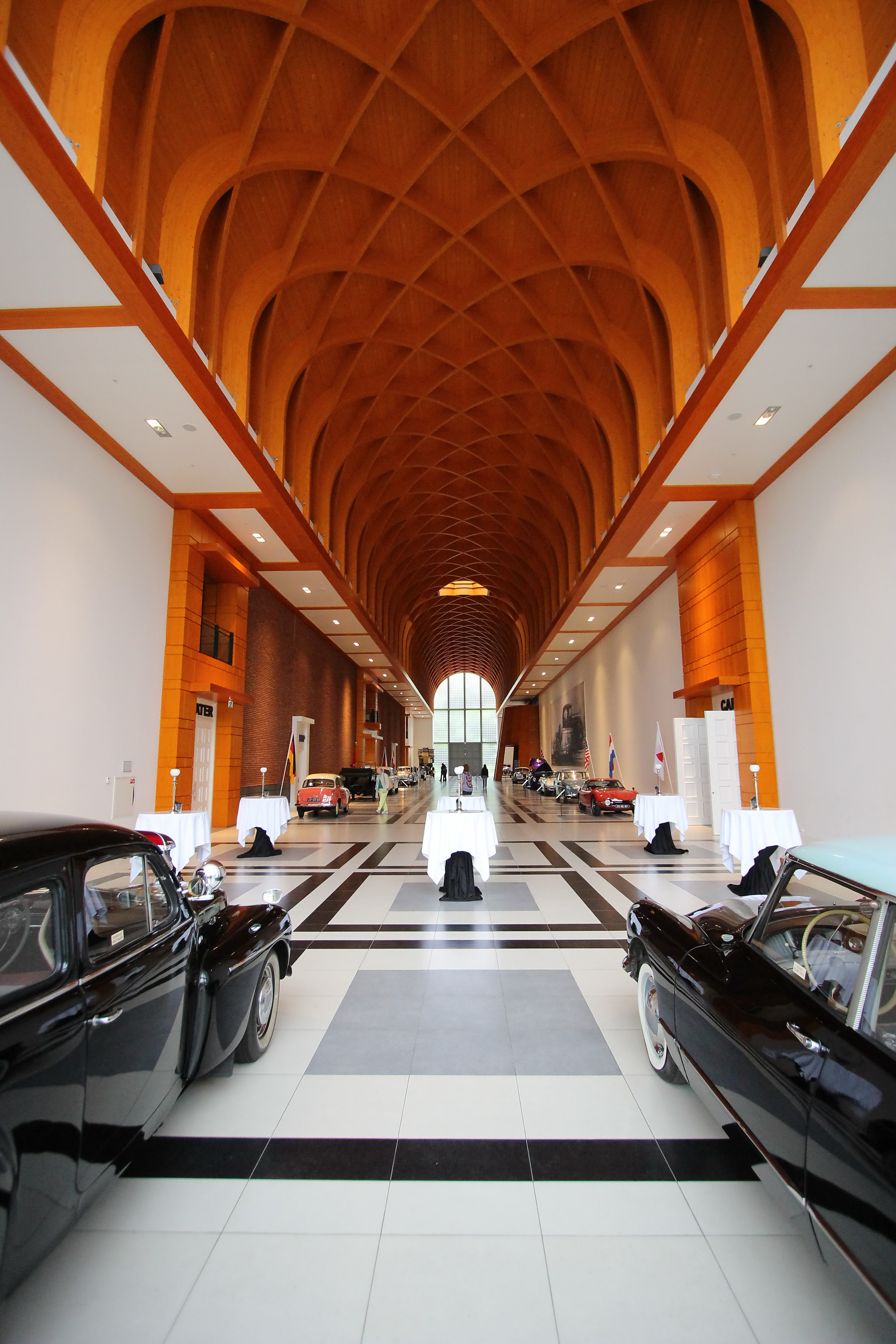
Entrance Hall to the museum

The collection has an international outlook and consists of around 275 automobiles. The museum has the largest collection of cars in the world from 1910 or older. The museum displays a large collection of the current remaining 15 classic cars of the Dutch brand Spyker and the only remaining Eysink (a car-brand from Amersfoort). In the former museum of Raamsdonksveer these Dutch cars used to be displayed at the so-called "Trompenburg Square" with original fence of the original Spyker-factory, dismantled in 1993.

From post-World War II the museum features a car of Winston Churchill and a Cadillac that once belonged to Elvis Presley.

The former collection of old cars of the Dutch Autotron in Rosmalen had been on display since 2005 in Raamsdonksveer, and was moved to the new museum in The Hague. The Autotron has not had an automotive museum since its reorganisation in 2007.

In 2009, the museum acquired the 1913 Black Bess, a Bugatti Type 18, owned first by World War I flying ace Roland Garros (1888-1918) and then by British racing driver Ivy Cummings (1900-1971) who gave the car its name.

The museum also displays a large collection of paintings and drawings by Frederick Gordon Crosby.

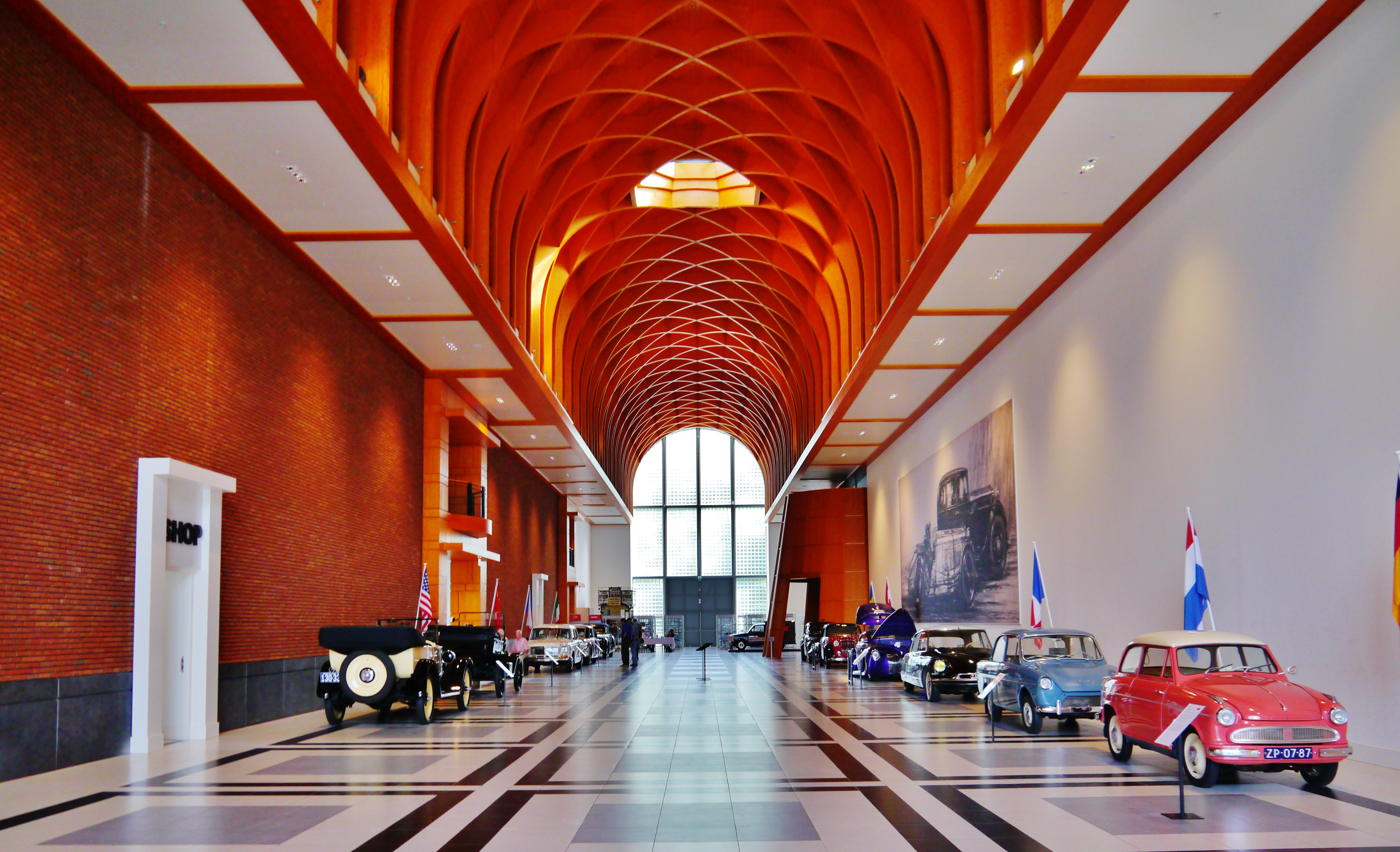
Louwman Museum, entrance

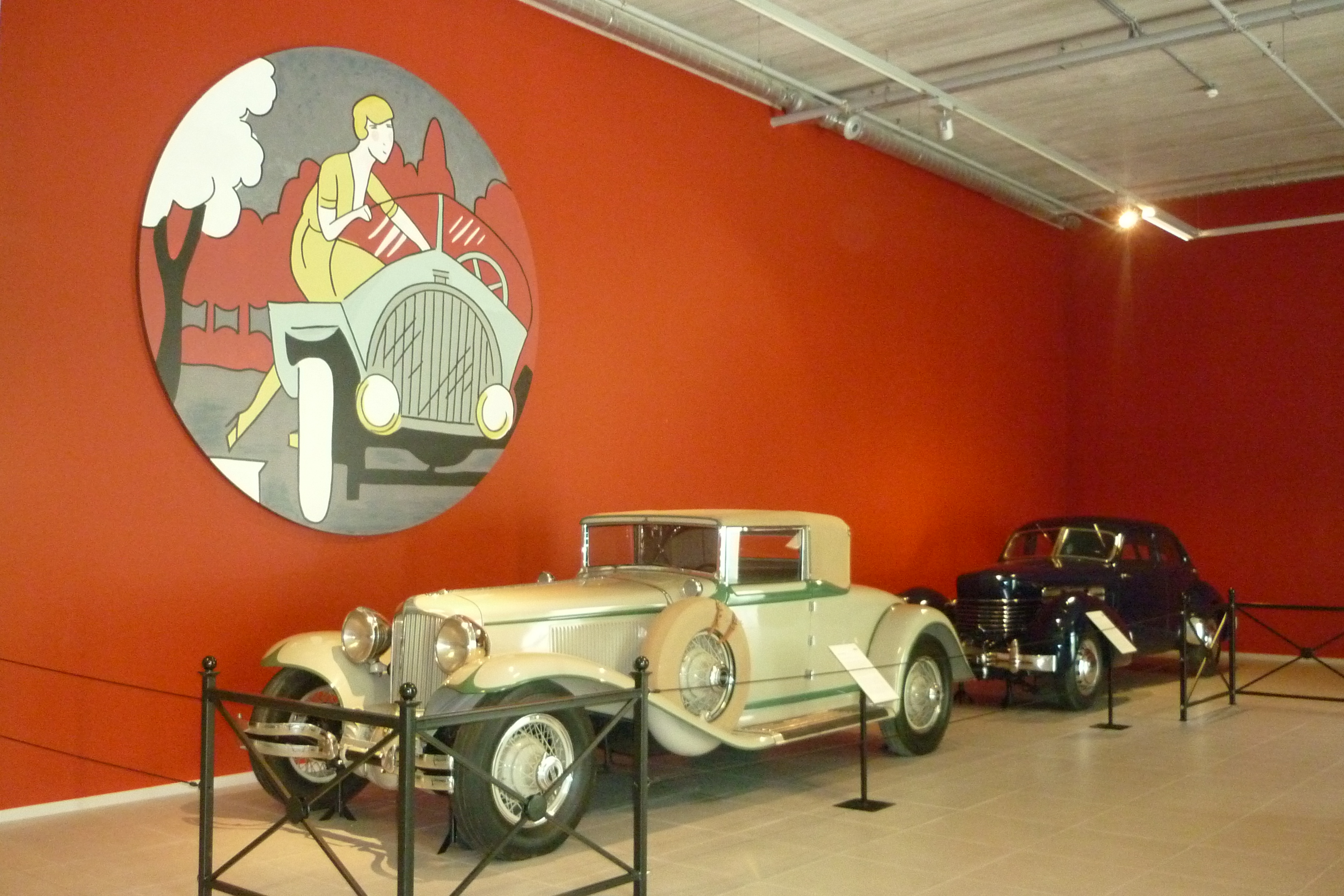
Two of the museum's Cords

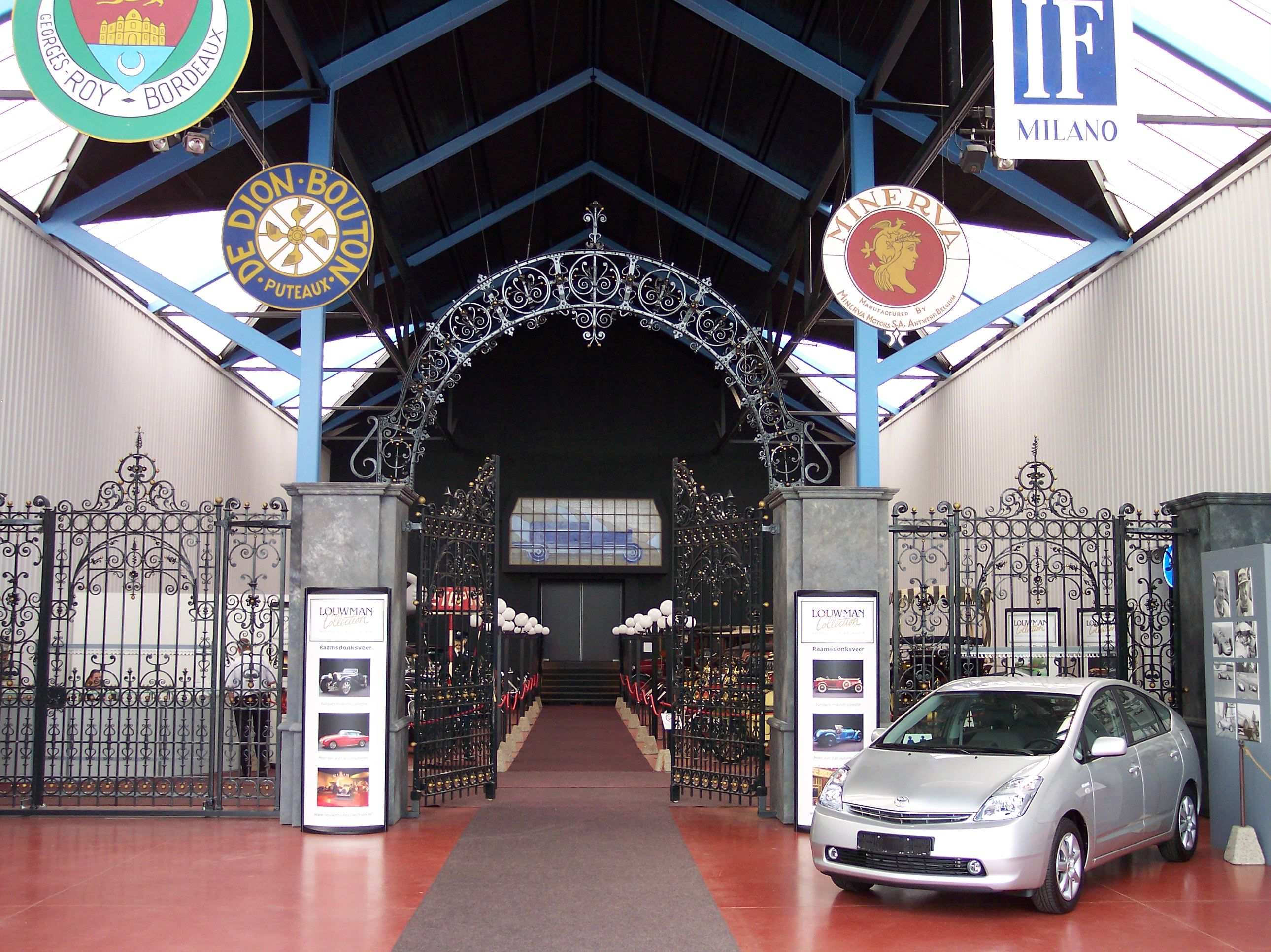
The former Nationaal Automobiel Museum

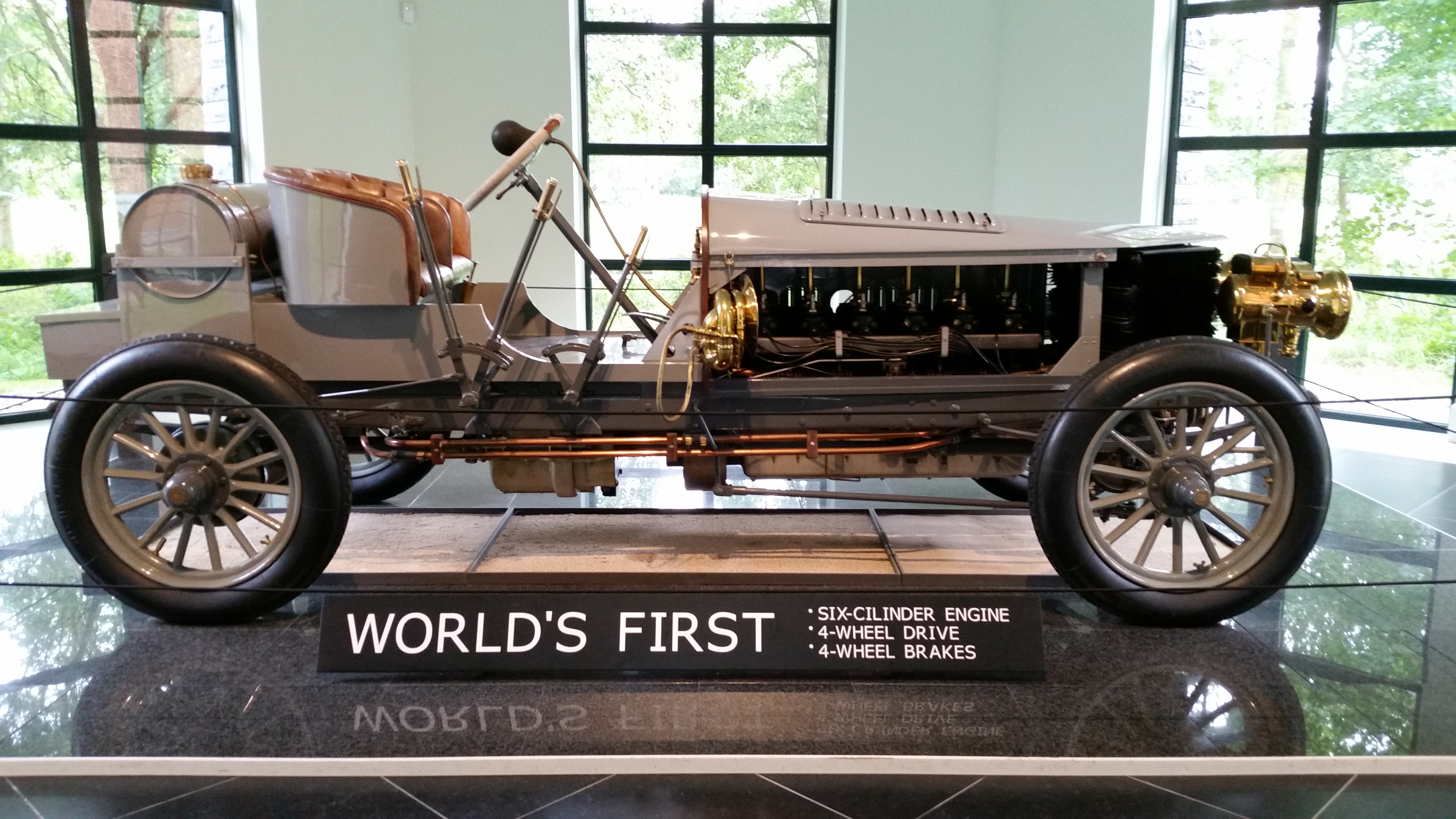
Spyker 60 H.P. (1903)

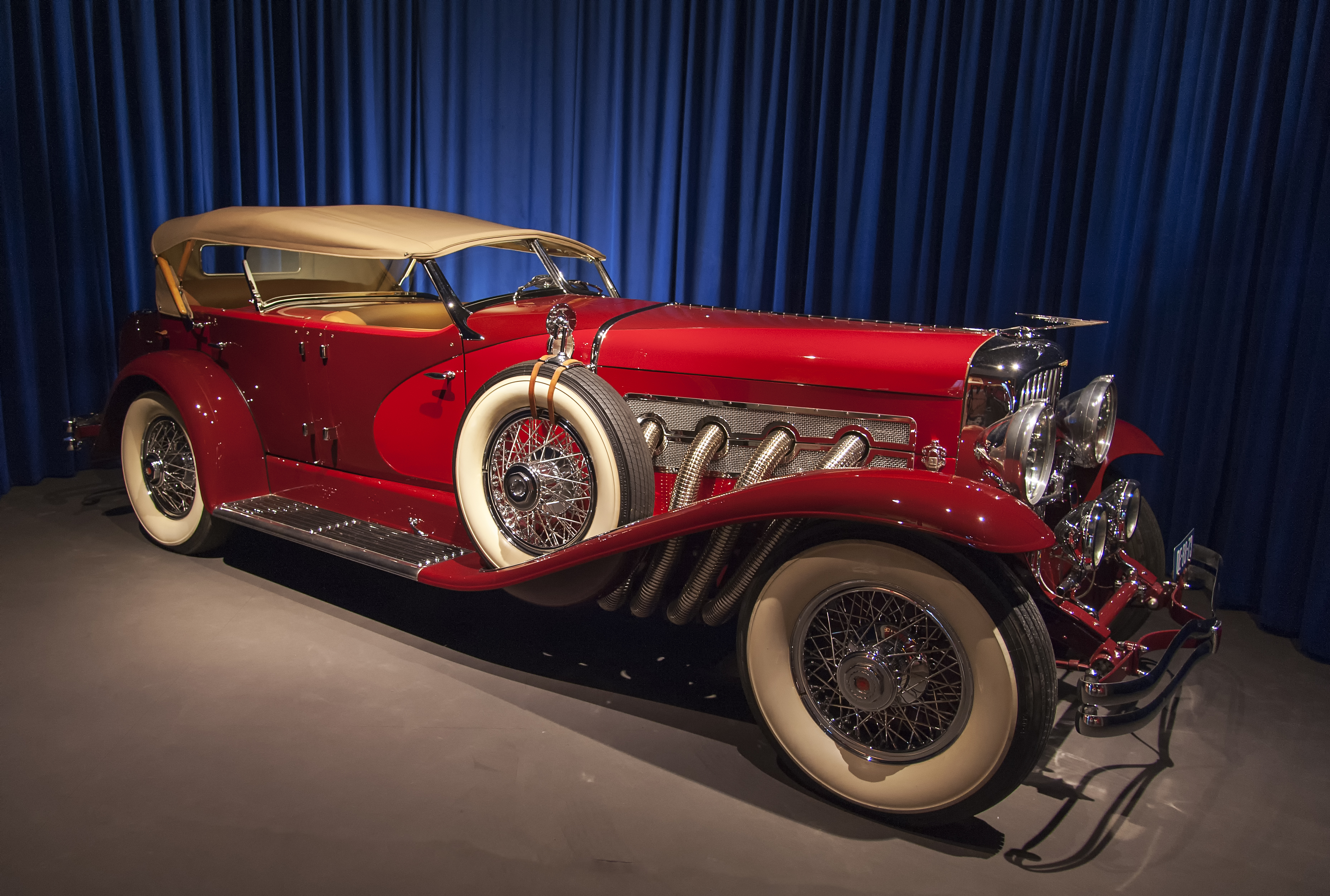
Duesenberg SJ LaGrande Dual Cowl Phaeton (1935)

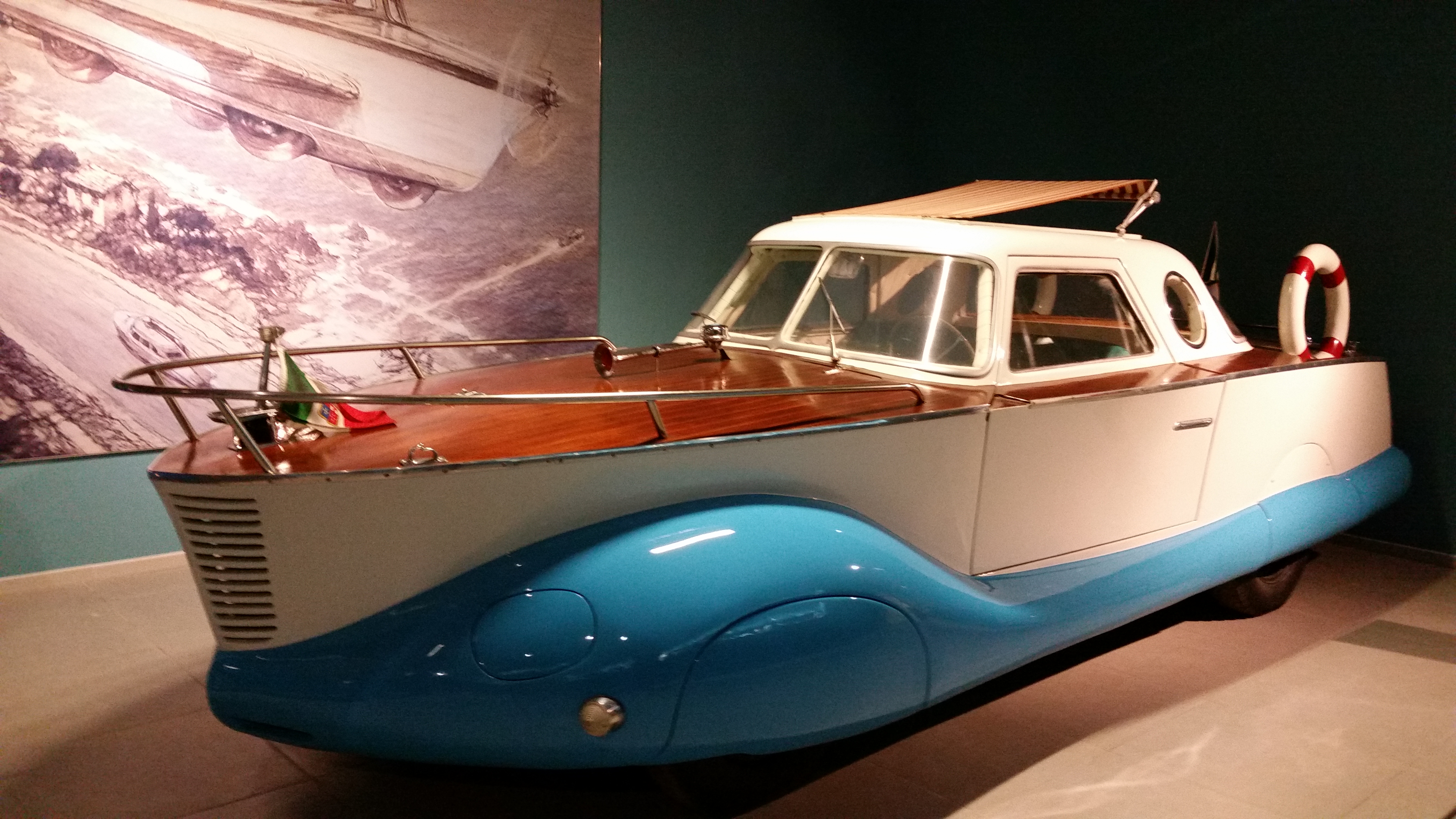
Fiat 1100 Boat-Car (1953)

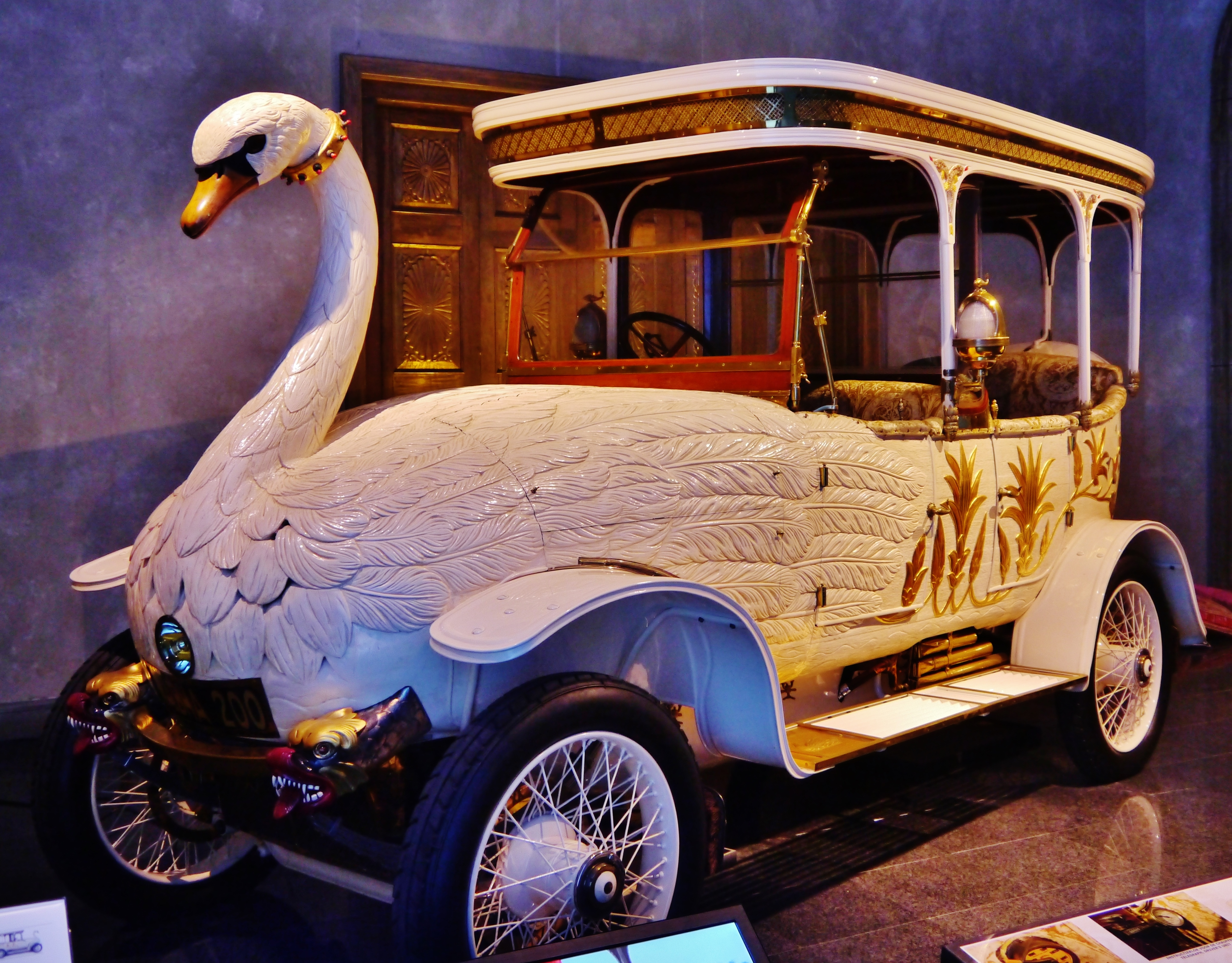
The Brooke Swan Car (1910)

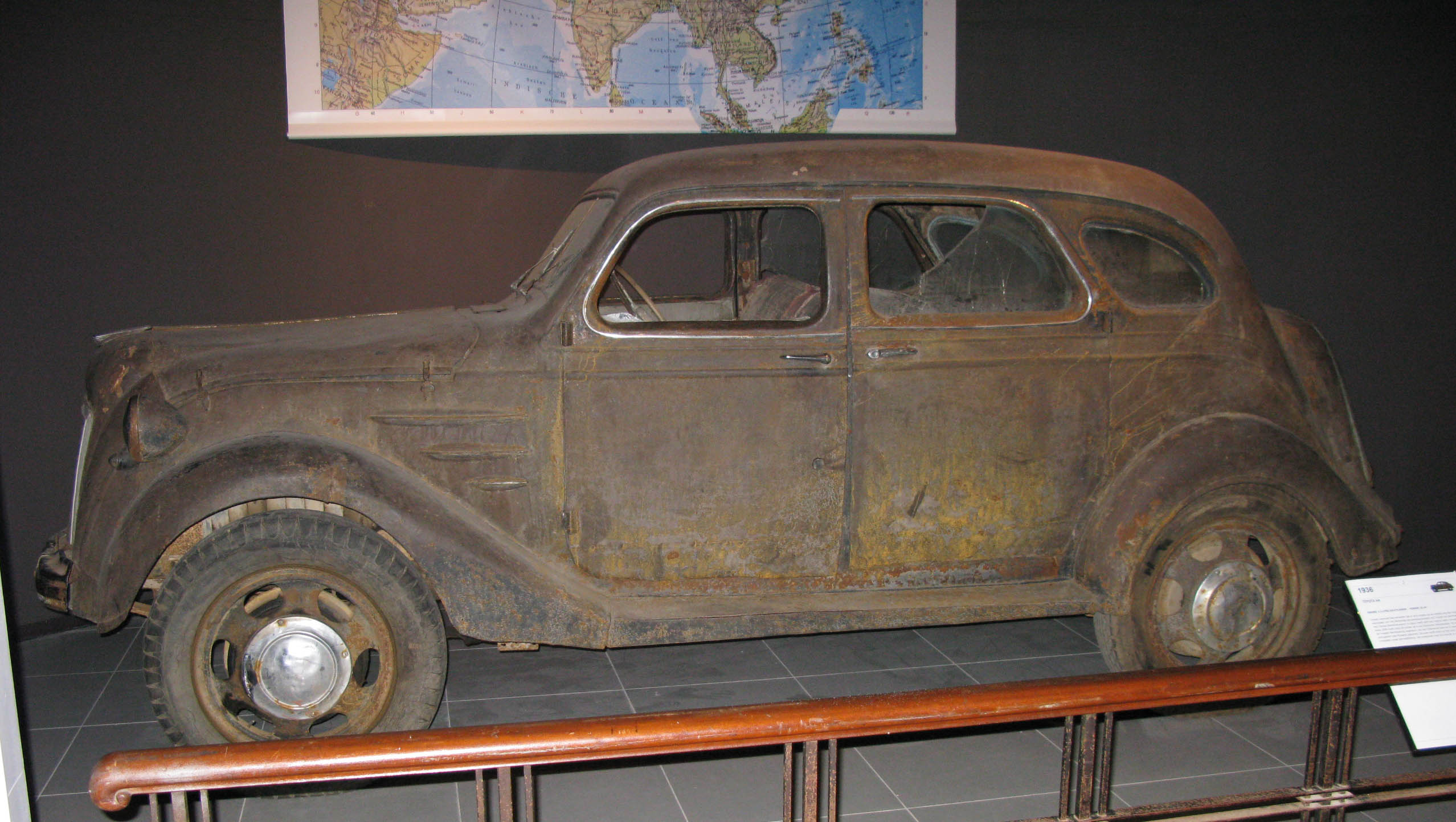
Toyota AA en el Museo Louwman
