= Hermann Habich =

German flying ace

- Habich during World War I
- Born: 15 August 1895; Plättig, Grand Duchy of Baden, German Empire
- Died: Unknown; after World War II
- Military career
- Allegiance: German Empire; Nazi Germany
- Branch: Luftstreitkräfte; Luftwaffe
- Rank: Lieutenant
- Units: Feldflieger Abteilung 47; Flieger-Abteilung (Artillerie) 215; Jagdstaffel 49
- Awards: Iron Cross First and Second Class; Military Karl-Friedrich Merit Order

Leutnant Hermann Habich (15 August 1895 – unknown) was one of the original pilots in the Imperial German Air Service, having earned his brevet two months before World War I began. He is credited with having downed and killed French aviation pioneer Roland Garros. Habich scored seven victories in all, becoming a flying ace. He joined the Luftwaffe in the 1930s and served in World War II.

== Early life ==
Habich was born in Plättig, the Grand Duchy of Baden, the German Empire on 15 August 1895. He was a pioneer aviator, having gained his license, number 697, before the start of World War I, on 17 March 1914.

== Military career ==
=== World War I ===
Habich was one of the early German military pilots, joining Feldflieger Abteilung 47 performing aerial reconnaissance as an Unteroffizier in late 1914. He then transferred to Flieger-Abteilung (Artillerie) 215 for artillery reconnaissance and ranging duties. He was awarded the Military Karl-Friedrich Merit Order by his native Baden on 5 February 1915, followed by both classes of the Iron Cross; his First Class Iron Cross was awarded 18 March 1916. In August 1916, he was promoted to Offizierstellvertreter and applied for duty in a fighter squadron. On 8 January 1918, he joined Jagdstaffel 49 in France. By this time, as a Leutnant, he was senior enough to sometimes assume command as the deputy commander. He scored his first air-to-air victory on 27 March 1918. By war’s end, he had destroyed five more enemy aircraft and an observation balloon.

Habich is widely credited with being the aviator who shot down and killed French flying ace Roland Garros.

==== Aerial victories ====
No.	Date @ time	Aircraft	Foe	Result	Location (all in France)
1	27 March 1918 @ 1100 hours	Albatros D.III or Albatros D.V	Airco DH.4 Ser. No. A7767	Destroyed	Bapaume
2	2 September 1918 @ 1320 hours	Albatros	Breguet 14	Destroyed	Between Châlons-en-Champagne and Suippes
3	7 September 1918 @ 1135 hours	Albatros	SPAD	Destroyed	Saint-Hilaire
4	26 September 1918 @ 1540 hours	Albatros	Observation balloon	Destroyed	Minaucourt-le-Mesnil-lès-Hurlus
5	30 September 1918 @ 1820 hours	Albatros	SPAD	Destroyed	Maure
6	5 October 1918 @ 1106 hours	Albatros	SPAD†	Destroyed	Somme-Py
7	6 October 1918 @ 0830 hours	Albatros	Breguet 14	Destroyed	Somme-Py

† Believed to be Roland Garros

=== World War II ===
By the 1930s, Habich worked as a military pilot and flight instructor in the Luftwaffe. He served on the Eastern Front commanding a Nachtschlachtgruppe in 1944. Later information about Habich, including when he died, is lacking.

== Honors and awards ==
- Prussia:
  - Iron Cross, 1st and 2nd Classes
- Baden:
  - Knight of the Military Karl-Friedrich Merit Order
