= Horstman =

Horstman is a surname of Dutch origin, or of German origin as a variant of Horstmann. Notable people with the surname include:

- Ed Horstman, American naval architect and multihull sailboat designer
- Katie Horstman (born 1935), American baseball player
- Rob Horstman, Australian politician
