= Horstmann =

Horstmann is a surname. Notable people with the surname include:

- Alfred Horstmann (1879–1947), German diplomat and art collector
- August Friedrich Horstmann (1842–1929), German physical chemist
- Carl Horstmann, 19th-century editor of The Early South-English Legendary
- Cay Horstmann, author of several computer programming books and the creator of the Horstmann indent style
- Dennis Horstmann (born 1980), German DJ and dance music artist known as Special D.
- Dorothy M. Horstmann (1911–2001), American epidemiologist, virologist and pediatrician
- Ignatius Frederick Horstmann (1840–1908), American Roman Catholic bishop
- Kai Horstmann (born 1981), English rugby union player
- Karl Horstmann (born 1967), American film director, writer and producer
- Ken Horstmann (born 1971), American film and television director
- Lally Horstmann (1898–1954) German writer and salonnière
- Lana Horstmann (born 1986), German politician
- Oscar Horstmann (1891–1977), American baseball player
- Rolf-Peter Horstmann (1940-), German professor of philosophy
- Roy Horstmann (1910–1998), American football player
- Sidney Horstmann (1881–1962), British automotive engineer and businessman
- Ulrich Horstmann (born 1949), German literary scholar and writer

== See also ==
- Horstmann suspension, type of armoured fighting vehicle suspension
- Horstmann Peak, mountain of Idaho, United States
- Horstmann Cars, British car manufacturer
