= Frederick Gordon Crosby =

English automotive illustrator (1885–1943)

Frederick Gordon Crosby (1885 – August 1943) was an English automotive illustrator. He worked for the magazine Autocar for most of his life. His illustrations and paintings reflect the excitement and glamour that surrounded the birth and early development of the automotive industry.

== Early life ==
Crosby attended Christ's Hospital (Bluecoat) school, just outside London.

=== Early work ===
Crosby had no formal training as an artist, although he did attend life classes at art school some time after the start of his professional career.

In 1908 he started his career as a draughtsman in The Daimler Motor Company's drawing office. At this time he moved into Arthur Ludlow Clayton's home in Coventry. This was an environment "full of young men, all wildly enthusiastic about the cars of the day".

Ludlow Clayton's first job was for the Automobile Engineer, published by Iliffe, the same company that published Autocar. Clayton drew Iliffe's attention to Crosby, who was subsequently commissioned to create a perspective drawing of the BTH magneto. This was to be one of the first drawings of a style that was later to be termed an exploded view, and begun Crosby's Autocar career.

=== Working for Autocar ===
In 1908, Crosby at the age of 23, moved from Daimler to Autocar. It was at Autocar, and at Clayton's house, that Crosby met and maintained a lifelong friendship with Sammy Davis and Monty Tombs. Crosby, as illustrator, and Tombs and sometimes Davis, as writer, were responsible for producing one of Autocar’s humorous stalwarts: "Keeping up appearances". Here Crosby sketched and Tombs wrote anecdotes about the construction of cars at the time. The characters created in Keeping up Appearances made it an instant hit the first time it was published, and it was produced for years afterwards. It humorously criticised the way that functionality of vehicles at the time was always put above aesthetics, much to Crosby's disappointment.

Through his years with Autocar, his talent and reputation grew. While not fond of travelling abroad, he would travel wherever his work took him. This included Paris, where he would sketch the latest models about to be released to the public, much to the annoyance of many of the vehicle stand attendants.

After some 30 years of travelling and working to press deadlines, the work began to take its toll on Crosby. In the last few years before the Second World War, it became clear to many of his colleagues that all the enjoyment had gone out of the work. However, during the war, his spirits seemed to rally and he produced some of his best works of battles both in the air and at sea.

=== Outside Autocar ===
From 1914 – 1918, Crosby was engaged in the investigation of German military aircraft, including Fighter and Zeppelin engine defaults.

== Crosby's work ==
Crosby bridges the divide between illustrator and artist. He was an illustrator with such outstanding creative and artistic ability that he was able to raise his historic records into works of art.

Crosby painted some very fine Landscapes, for example the oil paintings he did in 1918-1919 of the Scottish Highlands. At least two works are known to exist. One is in a private collection. The others whereabouts are currently unknown.

Crosby worked at a time when road transport was still in its infancy. The cars he illustrated then, are today the pride of many car collections. His work reflects the excitement of this time, which is lost with today's modern cars. While some of Crosby's paintings represent events he actually saw, many reflect stories told to him by eyewitnesses. These he reproduced in his own style, shot through with exaggerated excitement and atmosphere.

He is well known for his coverage of many of the great car races of the day, including Le Mans (see 24 hours of Le Mans), and the Monte Carlo Rally and Alpine Rally. The cars he best loved to illustrate were the big, pre-World War One racing cars, which feature prominently in much of his work. These cars lent themselves well to an artistic licence for slight exaggeration of their features. His touring scenes reflect the atmosphere of wealth and excess that surrounded these cars at the time.

Crosby, working at one of the greatest periods in the history of the car, did an enormous amount to glamorise motoring and motorsport of his time. His artwork fetches high prices, and both imitations and forgeries exist.

Crosby exhibited three times at the Royal Academy, the first in 1916 with his painting of Flt. Lt. Reggie Warneford shooting down an L37 over Ghent. This was both the first German zeppelin to be shot down by British aircraft, and the first aeronautical picture ever hung in the Royal Academy.

Crosby produced many works in gouache and oil paint, but most of his oil paintings are confined to works about wartime aircraft. His less formal works were produced in charcoal or crayon. These were usually created over the weekend for the Friday issue of Autocar. There are nearly 300 of these originals that are still held in Autocar’s strong room.

His work reflects the ease with which he was able to move between different media, from pen and ink to charcoal, crayons or watercolour, as well as a variety of sizes. Some of his most vibrant works being produced at the Targa Florio in Sicily, where he and W.F. Bradley were allowed to travel around the track by car during the race. Crosby was commissioned to make several paintings by Vincenzo Florio of the race, and these are still in possession of the Sicilian Automobile Club. Crosby also produced a set of 30, full colour caricatures of the foremost racers of the day with their cars, and worked on a number of plaques, sculptures and medallions of motoring subjects commissioned as trophies. Unfortunately, most of these are now missing.

Crosby also created the Jaguar car 'leaping cat' mascot. This first appeared on Jaguar cars late in 1938.

During the Second World War, Crosby produced some of his best works, especially the 'Roads of War' series, and his pictures of war at sea and in the air.

Crosby was regularly commissioned to produce works that would be sold or auctioned to raise money for charities such as:

Barnardos 1933-1934 French alps scene and;

RAF benevolent fund, Aeroplane Diving - commissioned by King George VI.

== Museum displays ==
A large collection of the works of Frederick Gordon Crosby is displayed at the first floor of the Louwman Museum in The Hague.

== Personal life ==
He married Marjory Dickenson, youngest of seven, in 1913. His first son Peter was born in 1914 and his second son Michael in 1920.

Crosby was not known to show much emotion, but there were two notable exceptions in his life. The first was when some of his party were killed in a plane crash returning from the French Grand Prix in 1922, and second, and even harder, was the death of his son Peter in 1943. Peter showed great artistic promise and was thought by many to be likely to be every bit as good, if not better, than his father. The war cut short that dream when he pronounced dead when his plane (a P-51 Mustang) went down over the English Channel.

Crosby died in August 1943, in N.W. Surrey, at the age of 58.

== Sources ==
As one of the few published sources of information about his life, this article borrows heavily from Peter Garnier's book The Art of Gordon Crosby.

- F. Gordon Crosby; Peter Garnier (1978). The Art of Gordon Crosby. ISBN 978-0-600-32038-8.

Other information has also kindly been provided by the Gordon-Crosby family.
