= Jagdstaffel 49 =

Jasta 49
- Active: 1917–1918
- Country: German Empire
- Branch: Luftstreitkräfte
- Type: Fighter squadron
- Engagements: World War I

Royal Prussian Jagdstaffel 49, commonly abbreviated to Jasta 49, was a jagdstaffel ("hunting squadron", i.e. fighter squadron) of the Luftstreitkräfte, the air arm of the Imperial German Army during World War I. The squadron scored 28 aerial victories during the war, including at least one observation balloon. The unit's victories came at the expense of one pilot killed in action and three wounded in action.

== History ==
Jasta 49 was founded at Flieger-Abteilung (Aviator Detachment) 12 at Cottbus on 23 December 1917. It went operational on 9 January 1918. On 17 January, it was assigned to 17 Armee. The squadron's commander claimed its first aerial victory on 27 March 1918. On 3 April 1918, it transferred to 4 Armee. In late May, it was posted to 6 Armee. The following month, it was integrated into Jagdgruppe 9 to support 2 Armee. On 8 July 1918, it moved to its final wartime posting, serving as part of Jagdgruppe A with 3 Armee.

== Commanding officer (Staffelführer) ==
- Franz Ray (with Hermann Habich as deputy)

== Duty stations ==
- Cottbus: 23 December 1917
- Schloss Villiers-Campeau: 13 January 1918
- Monveaux: 3 April 1918
- Lomme: Late May 1918
- Ennemain: June 1918
- Blaise: 8 July 1918
- Chémery
- Medard, Germany: 22 October 1918

== Aircraft operated ==
- Fokker D.VII fighter
