= Ivy Cummings =

British racing car driver

- Born: 27 October 1901; Edmonton
- Died: 4 December 1971 (aged 70)
- Known for: Motor racing

Ivy Cummings (1901–1971) was an early racing car driver, reputedly the youngest person ever to lap Brooklands. In 2009 her Bugatti car sold for over £2m.

== Biography ==
Ivy Leona Cummings was born in Edmonton on 27 October 1901 to Sydney George and Edith Cummings (née Mann). She had two younger brothers, Sydney Edward, and John. She became a famous British racing car driver as well as running a garage in Putney Bridge Road, London, where she repaired and sold cars. In 1913 she claimed to have taken her father's car and completed a lap of Brooklands aged 12.

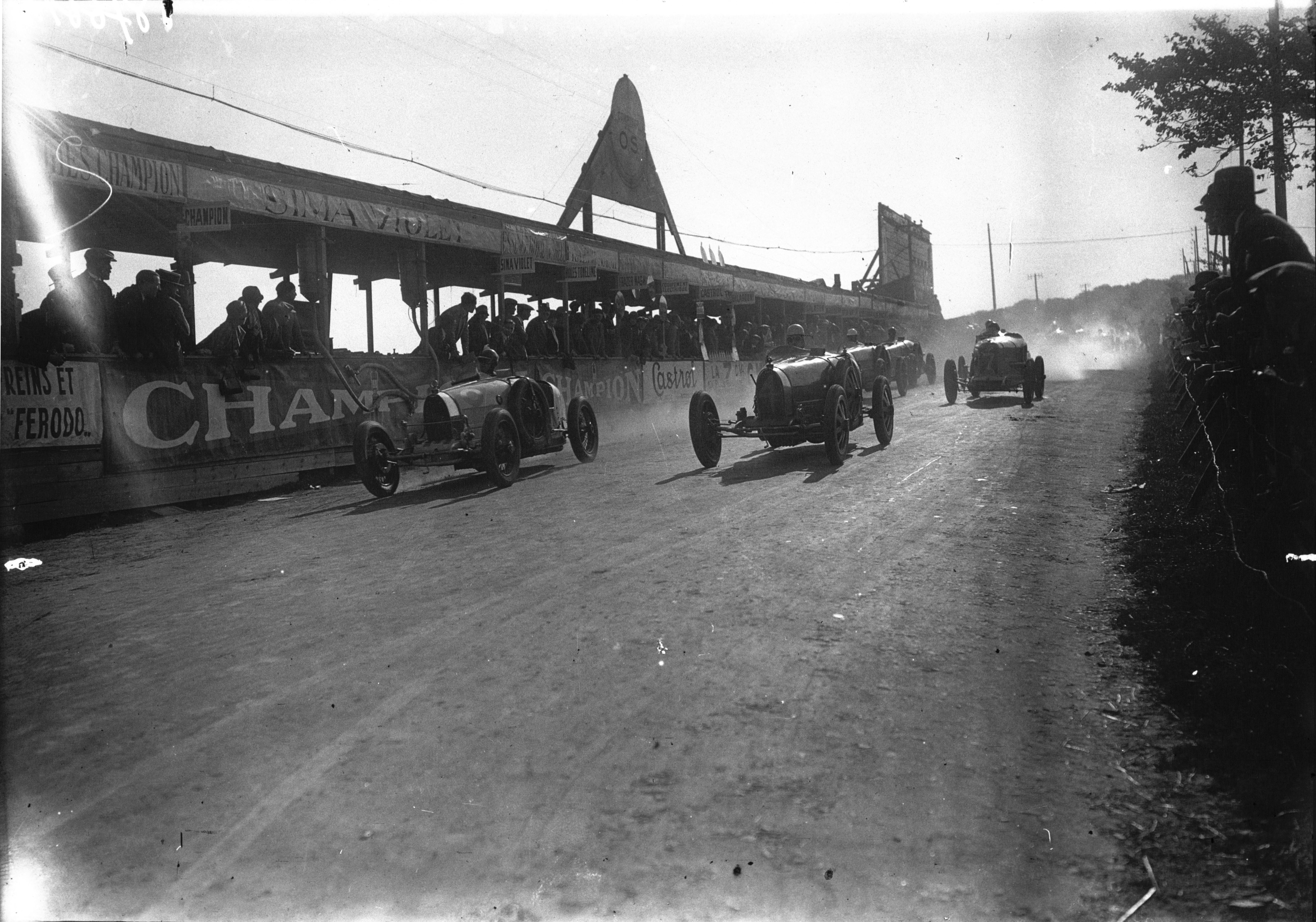
Starts of the 1926 Boulogne Grand Prix

During World War I, Cummings worked in a convalescent home for injured soldiers, and would take them out for trips in her own car.

After the war, around 1919, she began racing. She drove a Coupe de l’Auto Sunbeam 12/16 in a race in France in 1921. In 1922 Cummings won the Duke of York Long Distance Handicap in the same car. She came third in the Essex Senior Short Handicap and then second in the Essex Junior Long Handicap.

June and September 1923 saw her win a Bexhill speed trial in a Bugatti. The second race was in Black Bess, the 5000cc 1913 Bugatti Type 18. Her father Sydney, a car dealer, bought her the car and she named it after Dick Turpin's horse. She had been driving this car since March so it may have been the same Bugatti throughout, though she did own two. Cummings won the Skegness Speed Trials in this car in 1925. She was one of two women in the event, the other being Cecil Christie in a Vauxhall.

In August 1926, she entered the Grand Prix de Boulogne driving a Bugatti but crashed the car during the race, rolling it. She was uninjured and won a cup for highest average speed.

Cummings also raced a GN Akela. This was the car she usually used in hillclimbs. She took part in South Harting climb, the Arundell Speed Trial, the Spread Eagle Hill climb, the Aston Clinton hillclimb, the Brighton Speed Trials and the Herne Bay Speed Trails. She also competed in Junior Car Club High Speed Trial at Brookland and the JCC Half Day Trial. Including the GN and the Bugatti Cummings drove a Frazer Nash and a Riley.

In 1928, fellow racing driver Winifred Pink wrote that she considered Cummings to be one of the few women in complete control of a car at 80 miles per hour, alongside Mrs Scott and Ruth Urquhart Dykes.

== Personal life ==
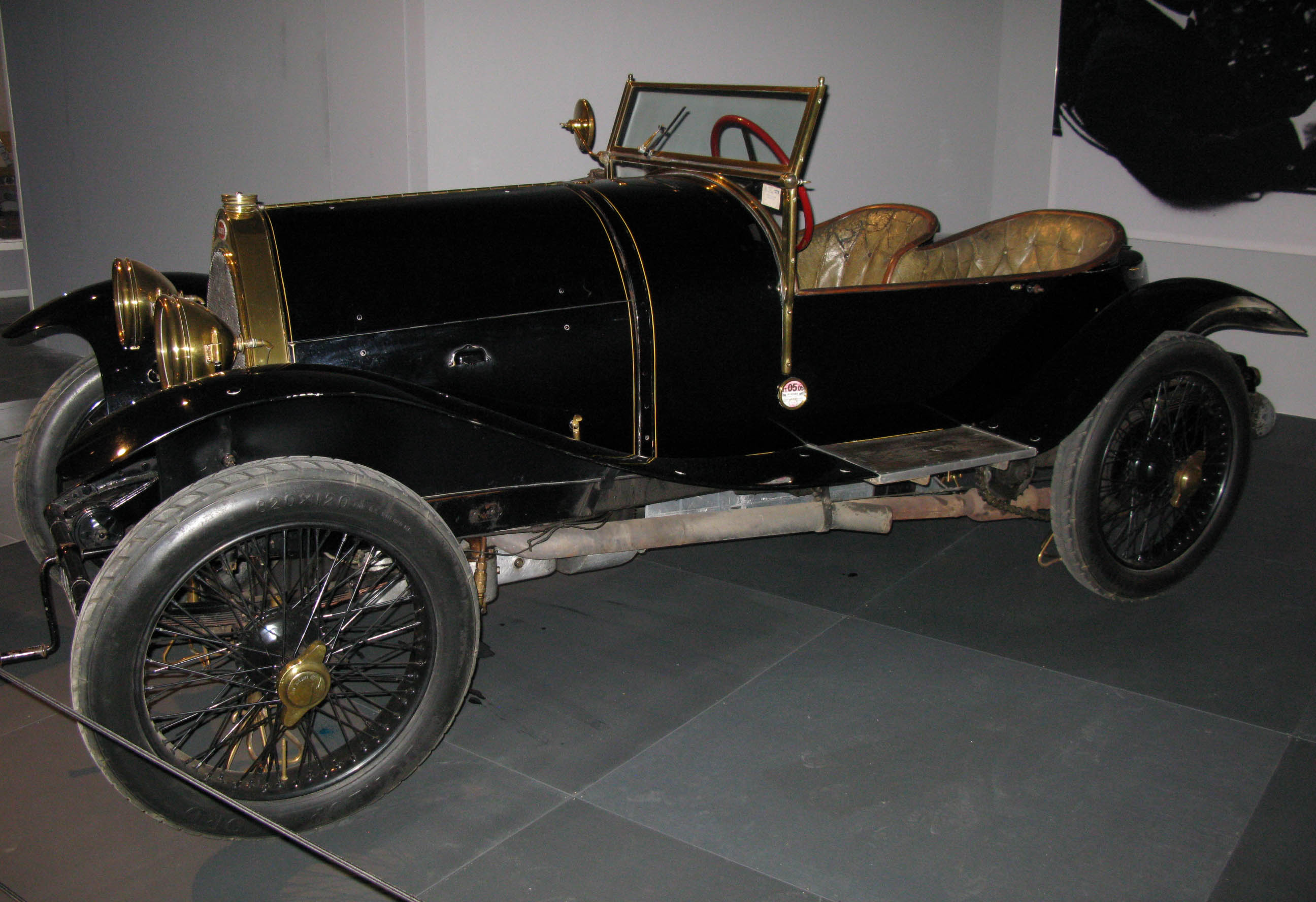
1913 Bugatti Type 18 1

Cummings married Stanley Hughes Simpson, a motor engineer, on 25 June 1925 in Holy Trinity, Brompton. In 1928, she married again, to radiologist Dr. Henry Warren-Collins. Shortly after she stopped racing regularly. She stopped running the garages herself in 1928, and gave birth to a daughter Cynthia in 1932. Her brother Sydney earned his pilot's licence at Brooklands and was killed flying with the Air Transport Auxiliary in 1940. Cummings died on 4 December 1971.

== Legacy ==
Her Bugatti Black Bess, by this time only one of three surviving models, was auctioned by Bonhams in 2009 for £2,176,617. It is now on display in the Louwman Museum in the Netherlands.
