= Lana Horstmann =

German politician (born 1986)

Member of the Landtag of Rhineland-Palatinate
- Incumbent
- Assumed office 18 May 2021
- Preceded by: Fredi Winter
- Constituency: Neuwied

Personal details
- Born: 25 November 1986 (age 39) Neuwied
- Party: Social Democratic Party (since 2009)

Lana Horstmann (born 25 November 1986 in Neuwied) is a German politician serving as a member of the Landtag of Rhineland-Palatinate since 2021. She has served as chairwoman of the Social Democratic Party in Neuwied since 2018.
